= Shandong University =

Public university in Jinan, Shandong, China

- 山东大学
- Official Seal of Shandong University
- Former names: Shandong Imperial University (Chinese: 山东大学堂; pinyin: Shāndōng Dàxué Táng); Shandong Provincial University; National Shandong University (simplified Chinese: 国立山东大学; traditional Chinese: 國立山東大學; pinyin: Guólì Shāndōng Dàxué)
- Motto: 学无止境 气有浩然
- Motto in English: Noble in Spirit, Boundless in Knowledge
- Type: National university
- Established: 1733; 293 years ago. Reformed as university in 1901.
- Affiliations: Ministry of Education of the People's Republic of China
- Officer in charge: Ren Youqun
- President: Li Shucai
- Vice-president: Wu Zhen, Liu jianya, Yi Fan, Zhu Dejian, Cao Xianqiang, Wang Meiqin
- Faculty: 4,600 (in 2021)
- Administrative staff: 7,898
- Students: 67,122 (in 2021)
- Undergraduates: 41,565
- Postgraduates: 25,557 (in 2021)
- Location: Jinan, Weihai and Qingdao, Shandong, China; 36°40′25″N 117°3′14″E (central campus)
- Campus: Jinan (6), Weihai (1), Qingdao(1）
- Colors
- Nicknames: Shanda (Chinese: 山大; pinyin: Shāndà)
- Website: 山东大学 (in Chinese); Shandong University (in English)

Chinese name
- Simplified Chinese: 山东大学
- Traditional Chinese: 山東大學
Transcriptions
Standard Mandarin
- Hanyu Pinyin: Shāndōng Dàxué

Shandong University (山东大学; SDU) is a public university in Jinan, Shandong, China. It is affiliated with the Ministry of Education of China. The university is part of Project 211, Project 985, and the Double First-Class Construction.

Shandong University derives its official founding date from the Imperial Shandong University (官立山東大學堂), which established in Jinan in November 1901 on the request of Yuan Shikai, then Governor of Shandong, as the second modern national university in the country. The precursor institution of Shandong University Medical School, Cheeloo University, was founded by American and English mission agencies in the late 19th century as Tengchow College of Liberal Arts in Penglai. Tengchow College was the first modern institution of higher learning in China.

Shandong University has eight campuses, all but two of which are located in the provincial capital city of Jinan. The rest are located in Weihai and Qingdao respectively.

Shandong University is constantly ranked the best university in Shandong province, and one of the top-ranked universities in the People's Republic of China. It is classified as a Double First Class University and was formerly part of both the Project 985 and Project 211 national key initiatives. Shandong University is among the Chinese universities with the most comprehensive range of academic disciplines, representing a typical comprehensive university that covers all major fields of study except military science.

As of 2024, twenty of its disciplines are ranked among the top 1% worldwide according to the ESI (Essential Science Indicators) rankings, with five disciplines ranked in the top 0.1%. The university has also signed intercollegiate cooperation agreements with more than 300 universities and institutions in over 30 countries and regions.

== History ==
=== Traditional learning in Shandong (1733–1901) ===
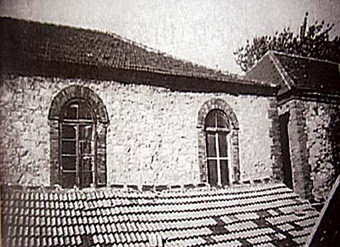
Buildings of the Luoyuan Academy in Jinan

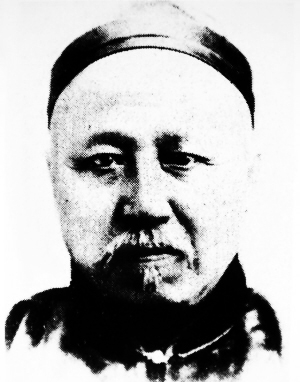
Miao Quansun, a historian, bibliographer, and book collector, taught at the Luoyuan Academy and helped to establish China's first modern libraries.

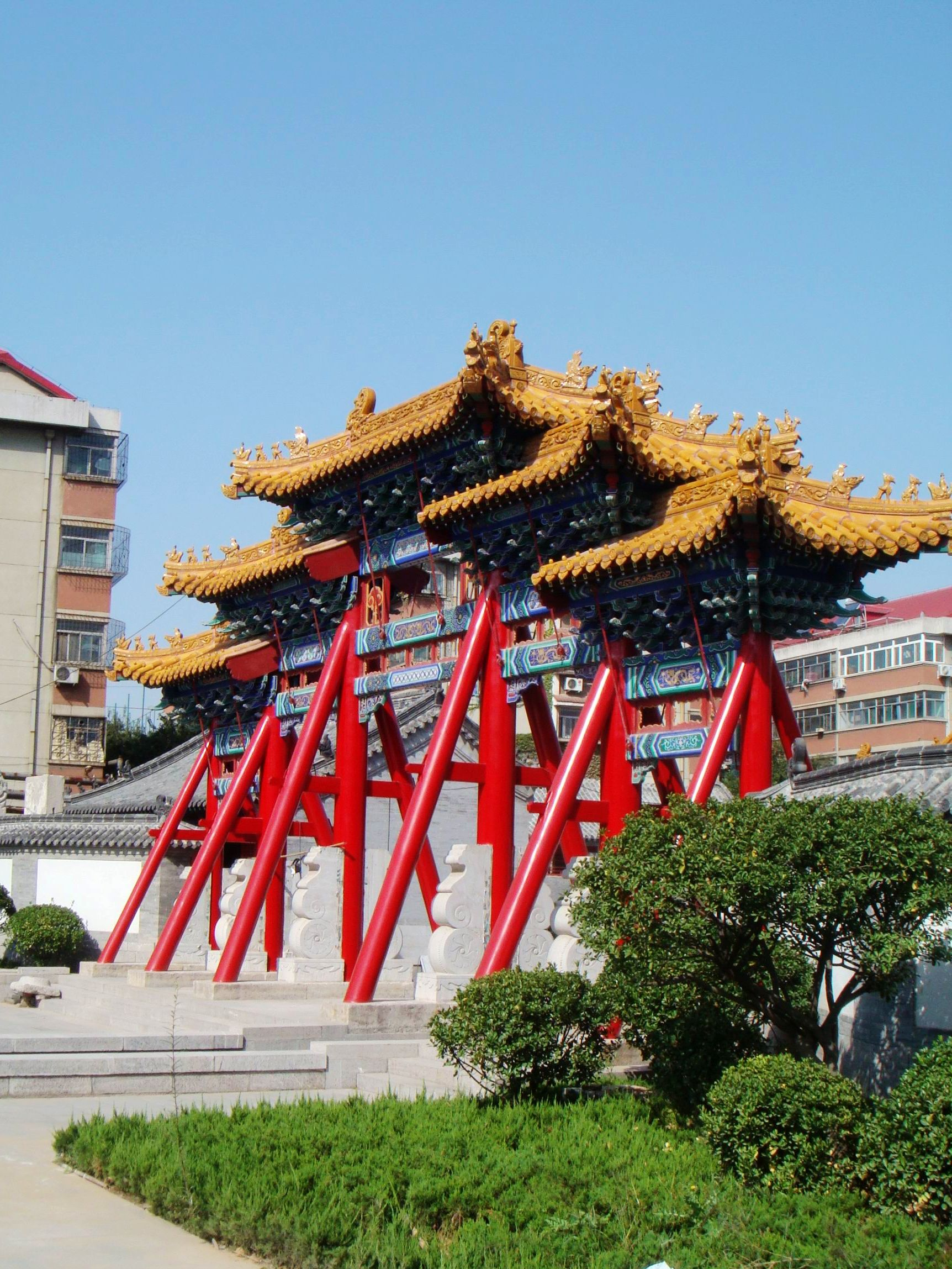
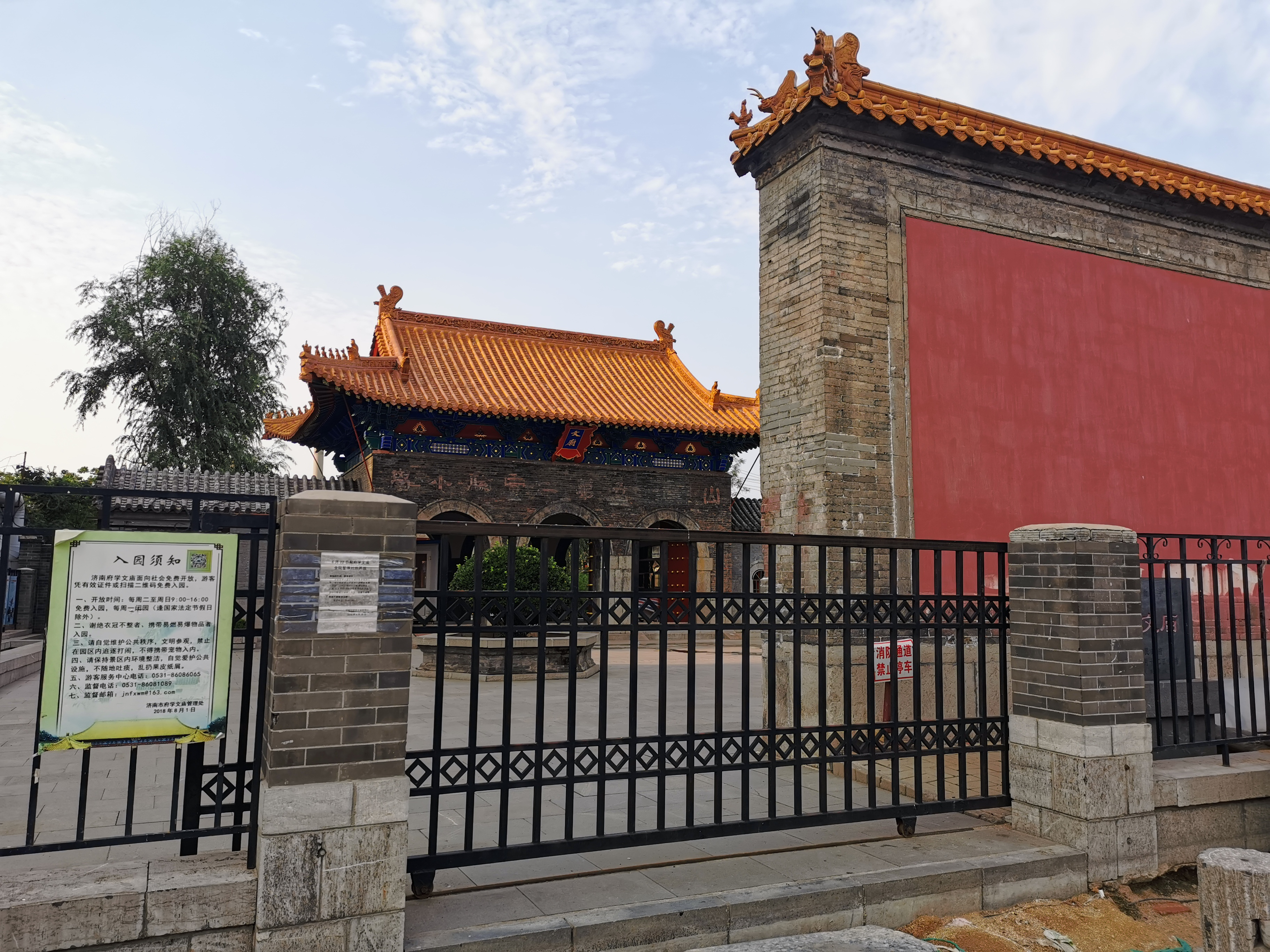
The Confucian Temple of Jinan, which was constructed in Song Dynasty and used as the site for the imperial examination. Jinan has served as the center of culture and politics of Shandong Province for more than seven centuries.

The Luoyuan Academy (Chinese: 泺源书院; pinyin: Luoyuán Shūyuàn) was established in Jinan in 1733 by an imperial edict from the Yongzheng Emperor of the Qing Dynasty. The governor of Shandong, Yue Jun (simplified Chinese: 岳浚; traditional Chinese: 岳濬; pinyin: Yuè Jùn), received 1,000 taels of silver (approximately 37 kg) to fund the establishment of the academy. The name "Luoyuan" (literally "source of the Luo [River]") refers to the original location of the academy near the Baotu Spring. The academy was dedicated to teaching the Chinese classics to the sons of the gentry. Scholars affiliated with the academy include: Bi Yuan (畢沅, 1730–1797), Sang Tiaoyuan (桑调元, 1695–1771), Shen Qiyuan (沈起元, 1685–1763), He Shaoji (何紹基, 1799–1873), Kuang Yuan (匡源, 1815–1881), Wang Zhihan (王之翰, 1821–1850), Liu Yaochun (刘耀春), Zhu Xuedu (朱学笃, 1826–1892), and Miao Quansun (缪荃孙, 1844–1919). In 1881, the American Presbyterian missionaries John Murray (Chinese: 莫约翰; pinyin: Mò Yuēhàn) and Stephen A. Hunter (Chinese: 洪士提反; pinyin: Hóngshì Tífǎn) attempted to purchase a property adjacent to the Luoyuan Academy for use as a chapel. This led to a violent reaction when on July 13, 1881, literati from the academy incited an attack on the property. The incident, known as the "Jinan Missionary Incident" (Chinese: 济南教案; pinyin: Jìnán Jiào'àn), had considerable diplomatic repercussions for the relationship between the Qing Dynasty and the United States. The Luoyuan Academy was rebuilt in 1896 to become the largest institution of its kind in Shandong. Five years later (in 1901) it was replaced by the newly founded Imperial Shandong College which took over its campus (today the site of the Provincial Bureau of Statistics on Spring City Road (Chinese: 泉城路; pinyin: Quán Chéng Lù)).

=== 19th-century precursors ===
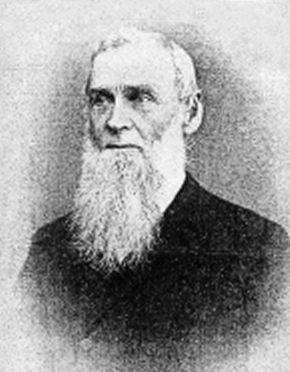
Calvin W. Mateer established the Tengchow College of Liberal Arts in Dengzhou (Penglai).

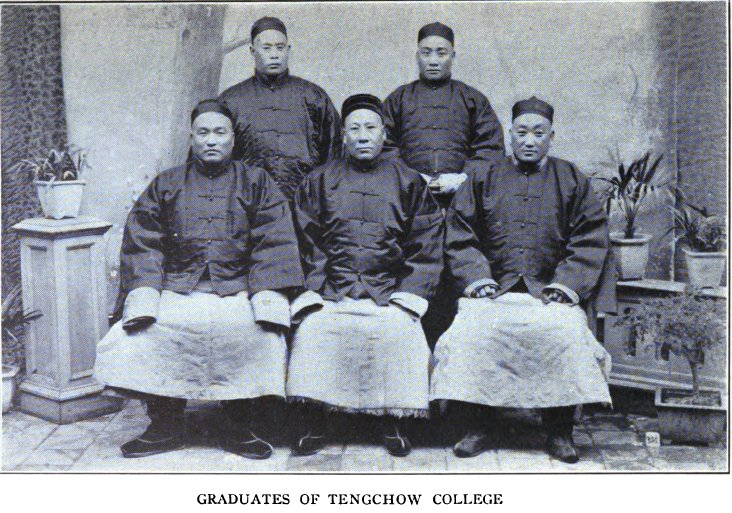
First graduates of Tengchow College, 1880s

The earliest precursor institutions that would later be fused into Shandong University were founded by American and English mission agencies: In early January 1864, Calvin W. Mateer, an American Presbyterian missionary, and his wife Julia Brown Mateer, arrived in the recently opened treaty port of Dengzhou (Chinese: 登州; Wade–Giles: Tengchow, now Zhifu, Yantai) in the area of the present-day city of Penglai on the north-eastern coast of Shandong Peninsula. Their journey had begun in New York on July 3, 1863, had taken them around the Cape of Good Hope to Shanghai, and had ended with a shipwreck off the coast of Yantai. In the autumn of 1864, the Mateers opened an elementary school for boys, which was called Mengyang Educational Society (Chinese: 蒙养学堂; pinyin: Méngyǎng Xuétáng), in a Guanyin temple that had been sold to them since there were insufficient funds for its upkeep as a temple. The school's first class consisted of six boarders and two day pupils. The school was enlarged to accommodate 30 boarders and divided into primary and high school sections in 1869. The high school became known as the Wenhui Guan (Chinese: 文会馆; pinyin: Wénhuì Guǎn). The Tengchow College of Liberal Arts was formally established in 1882, i.e., at a time when the school had been operated as a primary and high school for 18 years already. By 1889, enrollment in the college had grown to 100 students. The six-year curriculum included algebra, geometry and conic sections, trigonometry and measurement, surveying and navigation, analytical geometry and mathematical physics, calculus, as well as astronomy. Religion also featured prominently in the curriculum as well as in daily life at Tengchow College. The college soon enjoyed a reputation for its high standards of academic excellence. When W.A.P Martin hired young professors of Western learning for the Imperial University of Peking (the precursor of present-day Peking University), 12 out of 13 young professors hired were graduates of Tengchow College of Liberal Arts. In 1884, shortly after the formal establishment of Tengchow College of Liberal Arts, British Baptists established Tsingchow Boys' Boarding School in Qingzhou, also located in northern Shandong, but not directly on the coast.

In 1902, the American and British missionaries agreed to combine their education ventures in Shandong, and established an arts college (Chinese: 潍县广文学堂; pinyin: Wéixiàn Guǎngwén Xuétáng) in Weifang, a theological college (Chinese: 青州共合神道学堂; pinyin: Qīngzhōu Gònghé Shéndào Xuétáng) in Qingzhou, and a medical college (Chinese: 济南共合医道学堂; pinyin: Jìnán Gònghé Yīdào Xuétáng) in Jinan. In 1909, all three colleges were consolidated into Shantung Protestant University (Chinese: 山东新教大学; pinyin: Shāndōng Xīnjiào Dàxué) which was later renamed Shantung Christian University (Chinese: 山东基督教大学; pinyin: Shāndōng Jīdūjiào Dàxué). "Cheeloo University", the school's informal name that had been officially approved by the school council in 1915, was derived from "Qilu", a nickname of Shandong Province coined after the ancient states of Qi (1046 BC–221 BC) and Lu (10th century BC–256 BC) that once existed in the area. Jinan was chosen as the new location for the consolidated university.

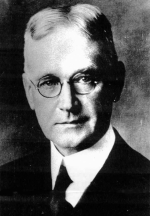
Henry W. Luce led the fundraising for Cheeloo University in Jinan.

A prominent member of Cheeloo University's faculty was Henry Winters Luce (1868–1941), the father of the publisher Henry R. Luce (founder of TIME, Fortune, and Life). Henry W. Luce initially led the fundraising efforts for the new campus in Jinan (today the Baotuquan Campus of Shandong University). In this capacity, he raised 300,000 dollars between 1912 and 1915 from donors in the United States. The buildings on the new Cheeloo campus were designed by the architectural firm of Perkins, Fellows, & Hamilton from Chicago. Henry W. Luce was elected vice-president of Cheeloo University in 1916, but resigned in the following year already, because he felt that he had insufficient support for his vision of a university of major national influence from the then Cheeloo president J. Percy Bruce.

Cheeloo University particularly made its mark in the field of medicine: From 1914 to 1936, the university built and subsequently expanded Cheeloo Hospital as a major facility for medical education in China. Between 1916 and 1923, the former Peking Union Medical College, the Medical Department of Nanking University, the Hankow Medical College, and the North China Union Medical College for Women were all moved to Jinan and merged into the Cheeloo University School of Medicine under Dean and acting university president Samuel Cochran.

Cheeloo University attracted Chinese intellectuals and scholars. The writer Lao She, author of the novel "Rickshaw Boy" and the play "Teahouse", taught at Cheeloo University (1930–1934) as well as at National Shandong University in Qingdao and other universities between 1934 and 1937.

In 1937, when the Japanese forces occupied northern China during the Second Sino-Japanese War, Cheeloo University evacuated to Sichuan and operated on the campus of West China Union University in Chengdu. In Jinan, the university's hospital remained open with a largely Western staff. During the war, the Japanese military used the entire campus for housing about 1,200 patients along with 600 officers.

During the Korean War (1950–1953), the Chinese government came to regard Christian schools as tools of "American imperialism" and hence embarked on closing them down. Cheeloo University was dissolved in 1952. Its Medical School was fused with Shandong Provincial Medical College and the East China Norman Bethune Medical College to form Shandong Medical College (renamed into "Shandong Medical University" in 1985).

=== Formal establishment ===
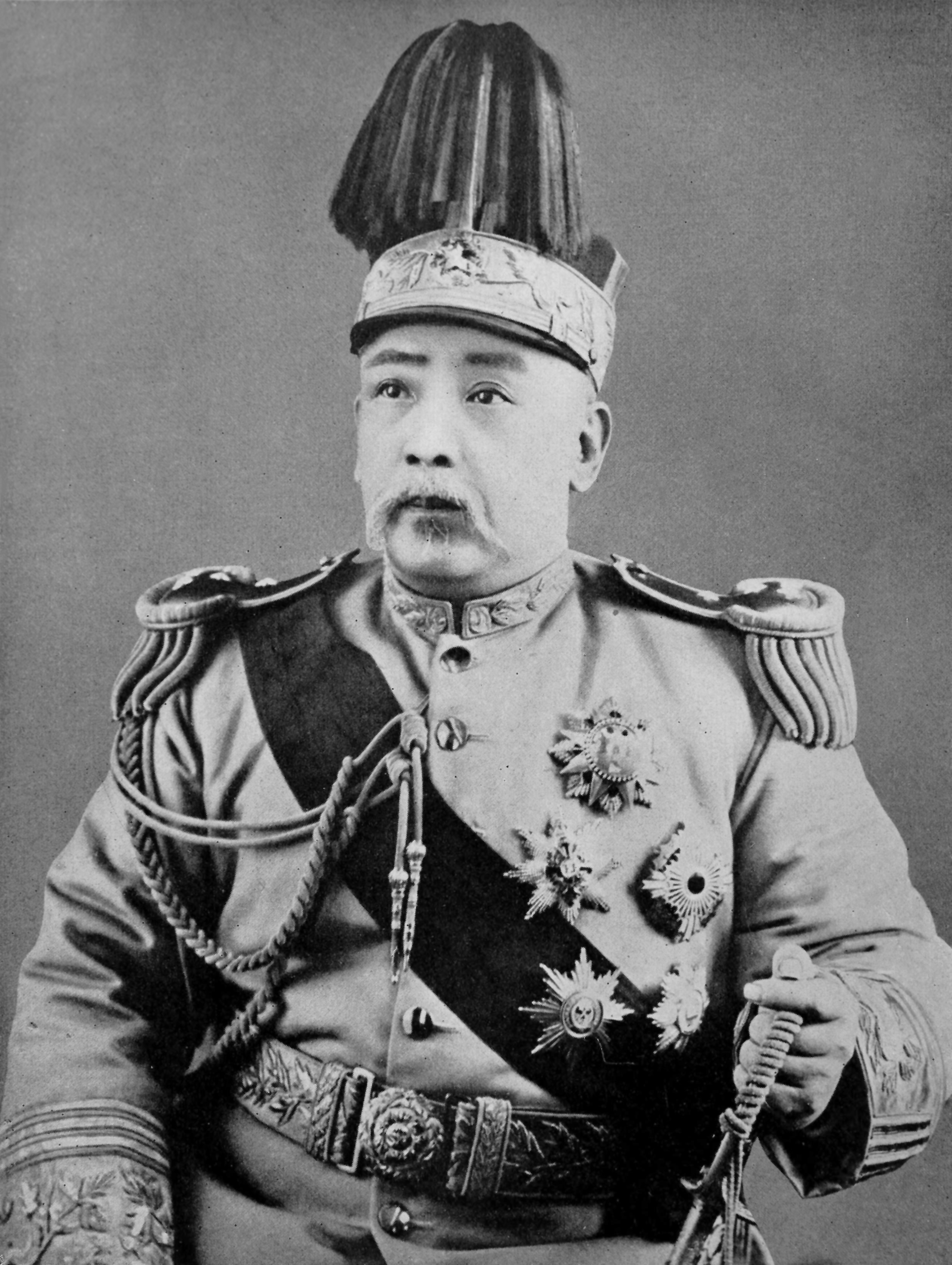
As governor of Shandong, Yuan Shikai (shown as Emperor of China in 1916) drafted the charter for Shandong College.

The initiative for the founding of Shandong University (as Imperial Shandong University, Chinese: 山东大学堂; pinyin: Shāndōng Dàxué Táng) in 1901 as a national, modern university came from Yuan Shikai, then the governor of Shandong province. Yuan Shikai was the chief military modernizer of the late Qing Dynasty whose control over a powerful army combined with his personal ambition played a key role in the birth of the Republic of China as well as its descent into warlordism in the early 20th century.

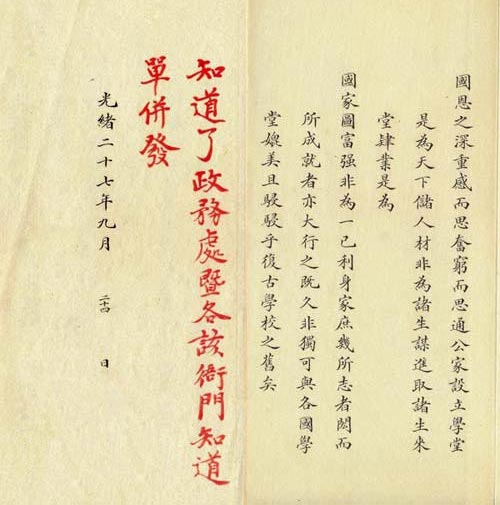
The 1901 provisional charter establishing Shandong university, which was approved by the Guangxu Emperor (in red ink)

Yuan Shikai had been governor of Shandong Province since December 1899. He had been appointed to this post to quell the Boxer Uprising in the province and to reassure the foreign diplomats in the country who were looking for quick decisive actions against the boxers. In 1901, the same year that marked the end of the Boxer Uprising, Yuan sent a draft for the university charter (simplified Chinese: 山东大学办学章程; traditional Chinese: 山東大學辦學章程; pinyin: Shāndōng Dàxué Bànxué Zhāngchéng) to the Guangxu Emperor and instructed Li Yukai, the magistrate of Penglai, to start preparations for the university. The draft of the university charter was approved by the emperor in November 1901, shortly after the Boxer Uprising had officially ended with the signing of the Boxer Protocol on September 7, 1901. Shandong Imperial University became hence the second modern national university established in the country after Imperial Capital University (simplified Chinese: 京师大学堂; traditional Chinese: 京師大學堂; pinyin: Jīngshī Dàxuétáng) that had been founded in 1898 and later became Peking University. The charter of Shandong Imperial University served as a model for subsequent foundations of imperial university. The original charter document for Shandong University is now kept in the National Palace Museum in Taipei, Taiwan where it had been taken during the retreat of the Kuomintang at the end of the Chinese Civil War.

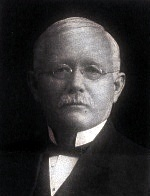
Watson M. Hayes was invited to organize Imperial Shandong University and served as its first dean.

Governor Yuan Shikai wanted a prominent position for Western learning in the curriculum of the new college. Hence, he invited the American Presbyterian missionary Dr. Watson McMillan Hayes (Chinese: 赫士; pinyin: Hèshì, 1857–1944) who was then serving as president of Tengchow College in Penglai to help with setting up the new Imperial Shandong University and serve as its president. The appointment of the Presbyterian missionary W. A. P. Martin as inaugural president of the Imperial Capital University three years earlier had set a precedent for this arrangement. Hayes arrived in Jinan in July 1901 and started the preparations for the new college. Hayes also published Shandong's first successful daily newspaper and petitioned the Qing court to grant a holiday on Sundays; As a consequence, Shandong University was closed on Sundays right from the start. However, by the end of the year, Hayes and six Chinese Christian teachers he had brought with him had resigned already over disagreements regarding the policy of mandatory Confucius worship for students of the imperial university. Hayes went on to teach the Presbyterian Mission Theological Class in Chefoo (present-day Yantai) and continued to work as a missionary and educator in Shandong until his death in a Japanese internment camp in Wei County (present-day Weifang) in 1944.

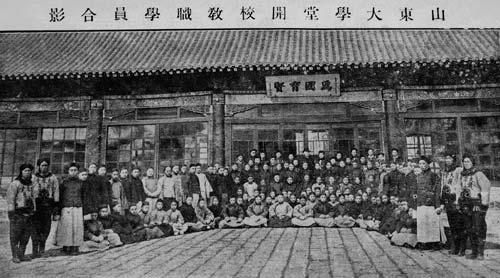
Opening ceremony of Shandong Imperial University

Imperial Shandong University occupied the premises of the Luoyuan Academy which had been renovated and extended significantly five years earlier. It was opened on November 13, 1901, in a ceremony attended by Governor Yuan Shikai. 299 student were enrolled in the first term, of which 120 passed the first examination and 100 were finally admitted. The first faculty had 50 members that also included teachers from overseas, it was later increased to 110. The curriculum contained Chinese classics, Chinese history, social sciences, natural sciences, and foreign language with more than 20 subjects being taught. At the beginning, the curriculum covered 3 years, but it was later expanded to 4 years.

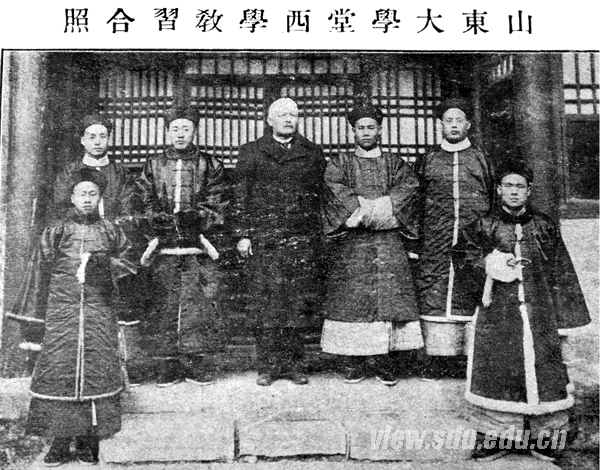
"Western studies" faculty of Imperial Shandong University (presumably W. M. Hayes and the six Chinese Christian teachers he had brought with him)

The first president of the new university was Zhou Xuexi.

In 1904, Imperial Shandong University moved to new premises in the Ganshi Qiao (Chinese: 杆石桥; pinyin: Gānshí Qiáo) area of Jinan (located to the south-west of the historical city center) and changed its name to "Shandong Institution of Higher Learning" (Chinese: 山东高等学堂; pinyin: Shāndōng Gāoděng Xuétáng). In 1911, it changed its name once again, this time to the "School of Higher Learning" (Chinese: 山东高等学校; pinyin: Shāndōng Gāoděng Xuéxiào).

=== Qingdao era (1909–36) ===
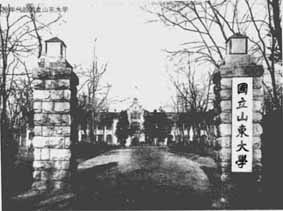
Gate of National Shandong University in Qingdao. The building in the background was originally part of the German Bismarck Barracks.

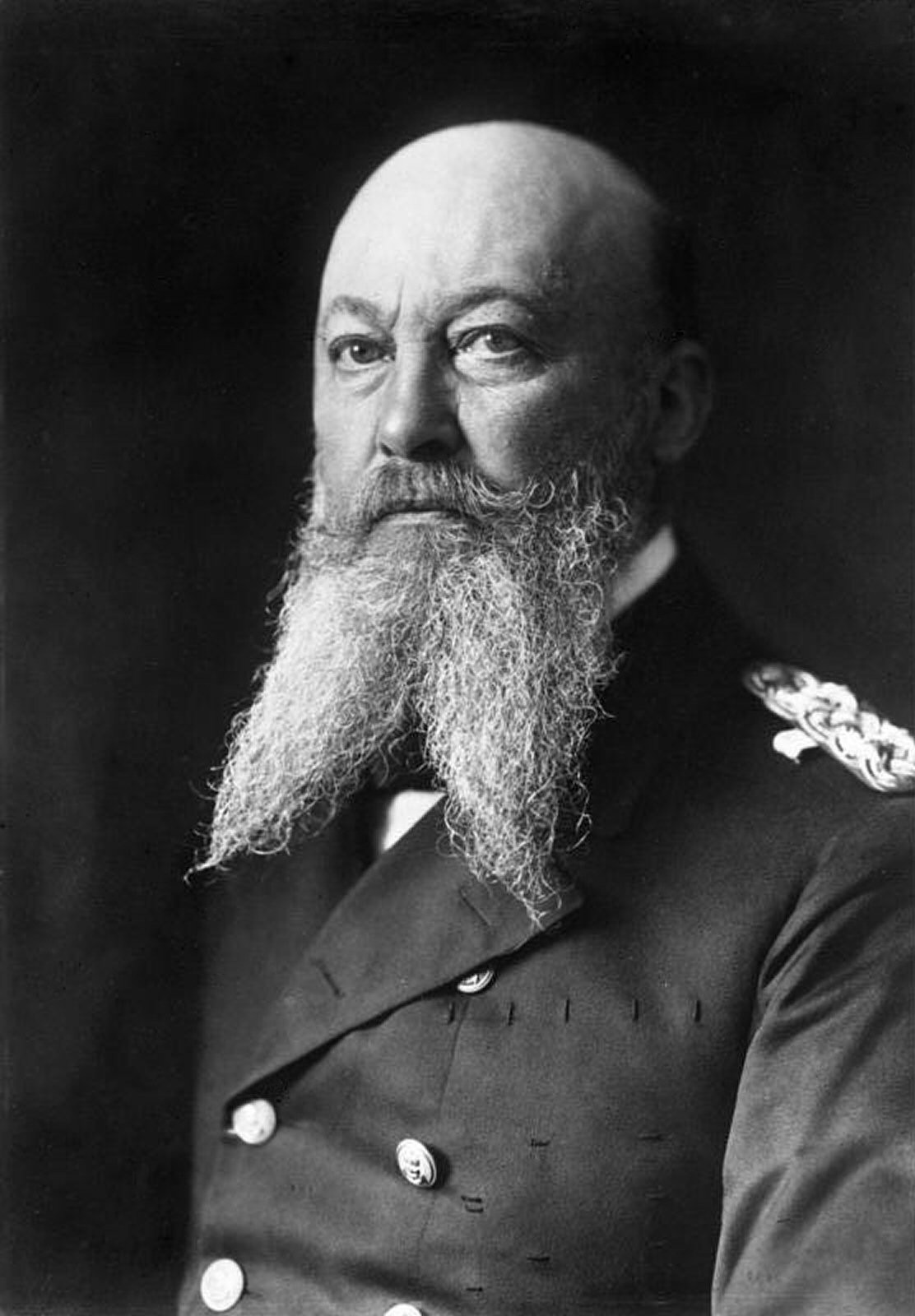
German Admiral von Tirpitz backed a plan that gave the Chinese government a stake in the new university of Qingdao.

The first modern academic institution in the port city of Qingdao, then part of the German Kiautschou Bay colonial concession, was the German-Chinese "Advanced School of Special Sciences of a Special Type" ("Hochschule für Spezialwissenschaften mit besonderem Charakter", Chinese: 特别高等专门学堂; pinyin: Tèbié Gāoděng Zhuānmén Xuétáng). It was founded on October 25, 1909, about 11 years after the German lease on the territory went into effect. In establishing the university, the German authorities took a much more accommodating approach towards the Chinese government than they had taken in the de facto annexation of the territory. The negotiations over the establishment of the school were led by sinologist Otto Franke. Although the German governor Oskar von Truppel vigorously objected to Chinese influence over the school, Franke's collaboration plan received firm backing from Admiral von Tirpitz as well as the German envoy in Beijing. The university operated under the supervision of the German naval administration, but was recognized and supported financially by the Chinese government. The cumbersome name of the school ("spezial" or "tebie", i.e., "special") was chosen at the insistence of the Chinese government to reflect its special status, below the Imperial College in Beijing but above the other provincial Chinese universities. The local informal name for the university was "Hainan School" in reference to an old name for Qingdao. Studies were organized in a "preparatory level" with a six-year (since 1911, five-year) curriculum for students aged 13 to 15 years and an "upper school". Subjects covered included German, history, geography, mathematics, natural history, zoology, botany, health, physics, chemistry, drawing, music, sports, as well as Chinese language and sciences. Whereas engineering and natural sciences were taught in an entirely "Western mode", the Chinese and European approaches were combined in the teaching of the humanities. Religious subjects had been excluded from the curriculum at the request of the Chinese government. The number of students at the school rose to about 400 in 1914, the school assembled a German and a Chinese library with about 5000 and 8000 volumes respectively. School operations ceased with the beginning of the First World War in 1914 and never resumed.

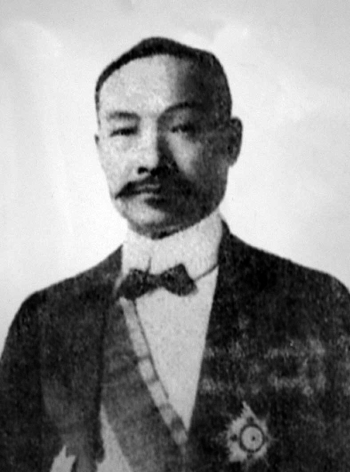
Gao Enhong, first president of the private Qingdao University and governor of the Jiaozhou territory

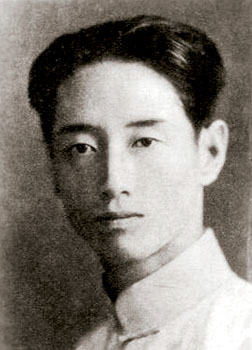
Poet Zang Kejia studied at National Shandong University and later co-edited the "Selected Poems of Chairman Mao".

Qingdao reverted from Japanese to Chinese control in 1922 and Qingdao University was founded as a new private university in August 1924; its first president was Gao Enhong, the governor of Qingdao (former Jiaozhou territory). The former German-Chinese university was not mentioned during the opening ceremony and it was decided not to hire foreign teachers for the time being.

Qingdao University was housed in the former Bismarck barracks that had been constructed for the German troops in 1903, i.e., during the time when Qingdao was part of the German concession in Shandong. The curriculum of Qingdao University was mainly focused on engineering and business administration and a bachelor's degree was to be awarded after four years of study. Luo Ronghuan, later a marshal of the People's Liberation Army, was among Qingdao University's students. Qingdao University fell on hard times after the Zhili clique of warlords that had ruled Shandong since the takeover from the Japanese unexpectedly lost to its rival Fengtian clique in the Second Zhili–Fengtian War of 1924. Gao Enhong was forced to resign as president of the university and funding dried up.

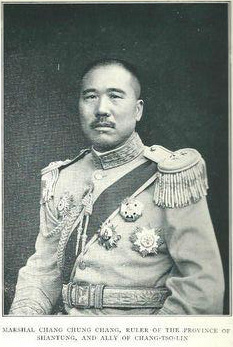
Warlord Zhang Zongchang ordered the fusion of six schools into a provincial Shandong University in Jinan.

The Fengtian clique installed the warlord Zhang Zongchang as ruler of Shandong. Zhang, an illiterate former bandit who had built a reputation mainly for ruthlessness, brutality, and colorful antics, ordered the fusion of six schools into a provincial Shandong University (Chinese: 省立山东大学; pinyin: Shěnglì Shāndōng Dàxué) in Jinan in 1926.

In 1928, the Kuomintang Government in Nanjing regained control of northern China and Shandong through the Northern Expedition. Soon afterwards, preparations commenced for a National University in the province. In August 1928, the government ordered the replacement of the provincial Shandong University with a National University in Shandong. The National University of Qingdao was formally established with an opening ceremony on September 21, 1930. In 1932, it was renamed "National Shandong University". Like Qingdao University, Shandong National University was housed in the buildings of the former Bismarck barracks. The university's chancellor, Yang Zhensheng (Chinese: 杨振声; pinyin: Yáng Zhènshēng), followed the model set by Peking University in establishing an "inclusive" (Chinese: 兼容并包; pinyin: Jiānróng bìngbāo), "scientific and democratic" (Chinese: 科学民主; pinyin: Kēxué mínzhǔ) academic environment. During this period, Shandong National University hired distinguished scientists, scholars and literary figures such as Lao She, Wen Yiduo, Shen Congwen, Liang Shiqiu, the nuclear physicist Wang Ganchang (faculty member from 1934 to 1936), and the embryologist Tong Dizhou. Poet Zang Kejia, who later co-edited the "Selected Poems of Chairman Mao" (Chinese: 毛主席诗词讲解, 1957), was a student of Wen Yiduo from 1930 to 1934 in Qingdao.

=== Wartime (1937–49) ===
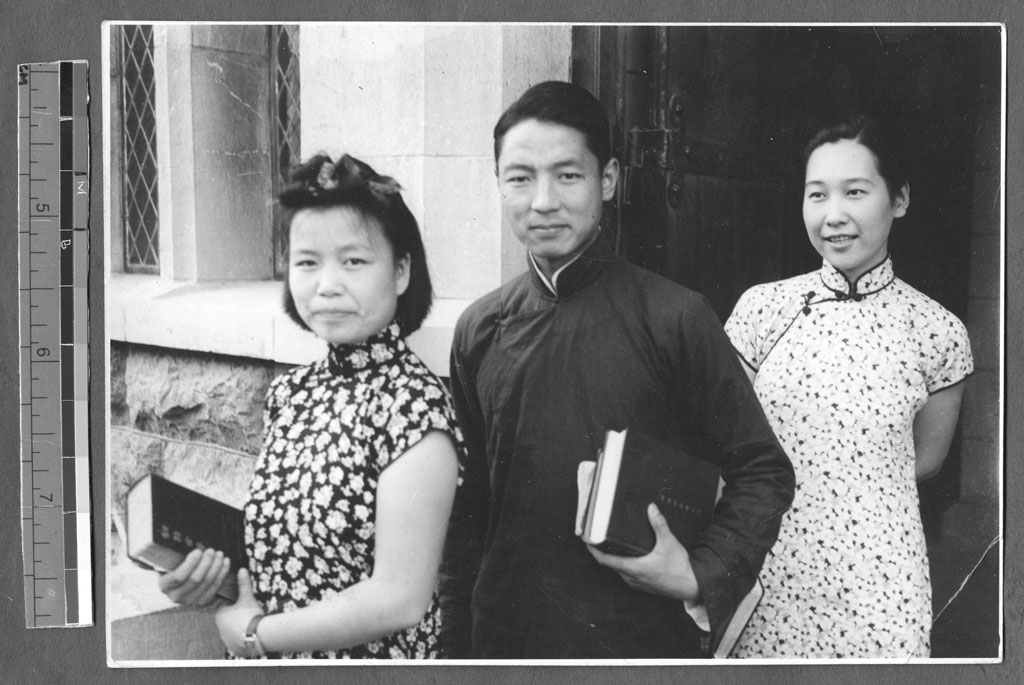
Students at Shantung Christian University (Cheeloo University), 1941

In November 1937, a few months after Marco Polo Bridge Incident that had marked the outbreak of a fully-fledged war in July of the same year, National Shandong University was evacuated from Qingdao. The university first moved to Anqing in Anhui Province and soon afterwards to Wanxian in Sichuan Province (today Wanzhou District in Chongqing). Books, equipment, and administrative files were shipped in separate installments and suffered severe loss. Classes resumed in Wanxian in Spring 1938, but were stopped soon after that on orders of the Ministry of Education. Teachers and students were then transferred to the National Central University that had been moved from Nanjing to Chongqing in the previous year. The books and equipment of Shandong University were placed into storage in the National Central Library, the National Central University, and the National Central Vocational School. After the war, in the spring of 1946, the university moved back to Qingdao.

From 1945 until May 1949, part of the Shandong University campus in Qingdao served as the headquarters for the U.S. Sixth Marine Division until it was disbanded on March 31, 1946 and later on for the U.S. Fleet Marine Force, Western Pacific. In 1947, the Su Mingcheng Incident, in which an American seaman had killed a rickshaw puller after an argument, caused protests of the university students.

Before the surrender of Japanese, in 1944, the Central China Bureau of the Chinese Communist Party (CCP) decided to establish Huazhong Construction University (华中建设大学) on the basis of the Huazhonga Party School. The school was located in Xinpu, Xuyi County, in the border area of Jiangsu and Anhui. In August 1945, the school moved to Qingjiang City.

In August 1945, the Shandong Anti-Japanese People's Government of the CCP established Shandong University in Linyi, the capital of the communist base; to distinguish it from the National Shandong University, it was called Linyi Shandong University. In early 1946, Peng Kang, the president of Huazhong Construction University, led the teachers and students of the university to merge into Linyi Shandong University.

Shortly after Japanese withdrew from China, CCP and KMT fought the Chinese Civil War. In the summer of 1948, the East China Bureau of the Chinese Communist Party decided to establish East China University in Weifang by combining the former Linyi Shandong University with Huazhong Construction University. After Jinan was taken by the communists, East China University moved to Jinan in November. In the winter of 1950, after KMT and US Navy left Qingdao, it was ordered to move to Qingdao, and in 1951 it merged with Shandong University in Qingdao.

=== Early time in PRC (1949–65) ===
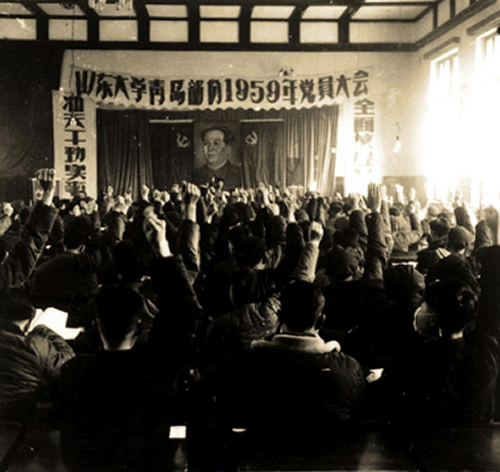
Communist Party Meeting at Shandong University in 1959, during the Great Leap Forward

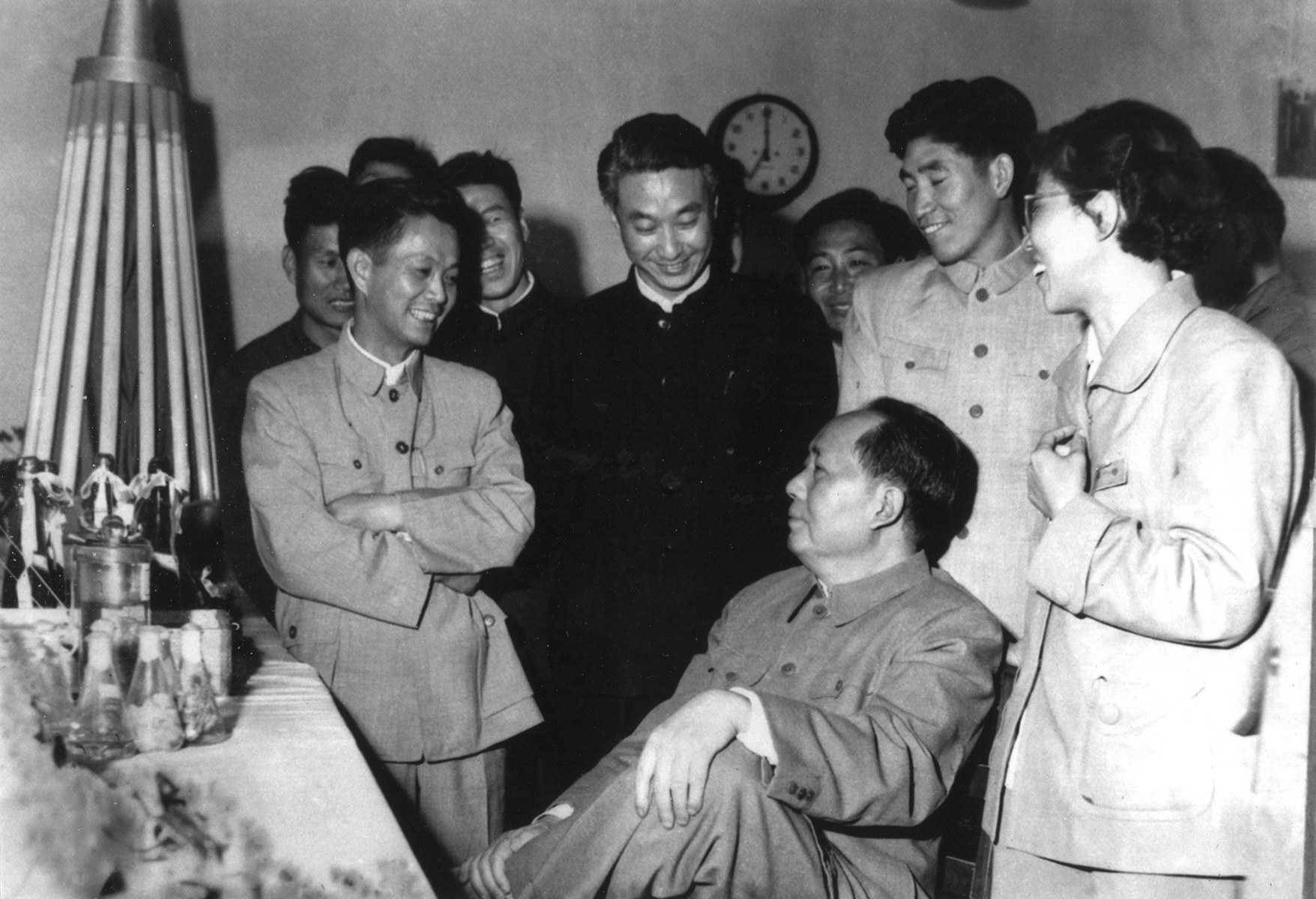
Mao met college students majoring in agricultural science in Jinan during the Great Famine

In 1951, East China University (Chinese: 华东大学; pinyin: Huádōng Dàxué) was merged into Shandong University. In the same year, the university published the "Journal of Shandong University". Cheeloo University was dissolved in 1952 and its Medical School became part of Shandong Medical College. Prior to the Sino-Soviet split, Soviet faculty members worked at Shandong University. In October 1958, the university moved back to Jinan from Qingdao. The marine sciences remained in Qingdao, where they later formed Shandong Ocean University. In Jinan, Shandong University first occupied the Hongjialou Campus. Construction of the new Central Campus commenced in 1959, during the Great Leap Forward and in the year of a great Yellow River flood. Shandong University was added to the list of National Key University on October 10, 1960.

=== Cultural Revolution (1966–76) ===
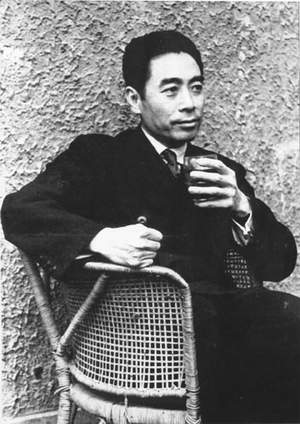
Zhou Enlai intervened the violent struggles to restore Shandong University during the Cultural Revolution.

Starting from early June 1966, schools in Jinan were closed down by strikes as teachers were "struggled against" in the Cultural Revolution. Shandong University was also completely paralyzed by the events. A complete restructuring was imposed on Shandong's university system: according to a resolution passed by the Revolutionary Committee of Shandong Province on July 29, 1970, the liberal arts of Shandong University were moved to Qufu and combined with Qufu Normal College to form a new Shandong University. The biology department was moved to Tai'an and merged into the Shandong Agricultural College. The rest of the sciences was to form the Shandong Science and Technology University. In 1971, the university's admission policy was also changed: in order to open the university to workers and peasants, new students were now nominated "by the masses" and then approved by the political leadership and the university. Until 1976, a total of 3267 students who were admitted under this scheme graduated after completing a 2- or 3-year curriculum. Premier Zhou Enlai learned of Shandong University's reorganization in 1973. Although he was already terminally ill with bladder cancer at the time, he intervened and ordered a return to previous structure of the university. As a consequence, all organizational changes imposed by the Revolutionary Committee of Shandong Province were undone in early 1974.

=== Recent history (1980–present) ===
Shandong University Weihai Campus was established in 1984. In 1985, Shandong Medical College was renamed Shandong Medical University. From 1986 to 1996, Shandong University underwent a period of rapid academic expansion. By 1997, is contained 14 colleges, 45 schools and offered 56 undergraduate program, 57 master's degree programs as well as 17 doctoral degree programs. Shandong University merged with Shandong Medical University and the Shandong University of Technology in 2000. With Shandong Medical University the former campus of Cheeloo University became part of Shandong University (as the West Campus, renamed Baotuquan Campus in 2009). The campus of Shandong University of Technology became the South Campus of Shandong University (renamed Qianfoshan Campus in 2009). Construction of the Xinglongshan Campus (then under the name "New South Campus"), a large new campus located in a mountain valley to the south of Jinan dedicated to education of first- and second-year undergraduate students, began in 2003.

In July 2019, the university attracted controversy when it was reported that male foreign students were assigned three generally female Chinese "buddies" to help them with life in China. An application form for the study program even mentioned "making foreign friends of the opposite sex". The university subsequently apologized but dismissed reports of male international students being paired with three female domestic students, saying that the language on the application form was "improper expression" due to "insufficient checks". The incident led to complaints about foreign students receiving too many privileges.

Academic institutions in the history of Shandong University
Establishment	Established by	Year established	Location
Luoyuan Academy (Chinese: 泺源书院; pinyin: Luoyuán Shūyuàn)	Qing Emperor	1733	Jinan
Tengchow College of Liberal Arts (Chinese: 登州文会馆; pinyin: Dēngzhōu Wénhuì Guǎn)	American Presbyterians	1882	Dengzhou (part of Penglai)
Tsingchow Boys' Boarding School (Chinese: 廣德書院; pinyin: Guǎngdé Shūyuàn)	British Baptists	1884	Qingzhou
Arts College at Weixian; Chinese: 潍县广文学堂; pinyin: Wéixiàn Guǎngwén Xuétáng	American Presbyterians & British Baptists	1902	Weixian (i.e., Wei County, today the city of Weifang)
Theological College at Qingzhou; Chinese: 青州共合神道学堂; pinyin: Qīngzhōu Gònghé Shéndào Xuétáng	American Presbyterians & British Baptists	1902	Qingzhou (part of Weifang)
Medical College; Chinese: 济南共合医道学堂; pinyin: Jìnán Gònghé Yīdào Xuétáng	American Presbyterians & British Baptists	1902	Jinan
Shandong Imperial University (Chinese: 山东大学堂; pinyin: Shāndōng Dàxué Táng)	Qing Emperor	1901	Jinan
Shandong Institution of Higher Learning (Chinese: 山东高等学堂; pinyin: Shāndōng Gāoděng Xuétáng)	Qing Emperor	1904	Jinan
Cheeloo University/Shantung Protestant University (later renamed to Shantung Christian University, Chinese: 齐鲁大学; pinyin: Qílǔ Dàxué)	American Presbyterians & British Baptists	1909	Jinan
Advanced School of Special Sciences of a Special Type (Hochschule für Spezialwissenschaften mit besonderem Charakter, Chinese: 特别高等专门学堂; pinyin: Tèbié Gāoděng Zhuānmén Xuétáng)	German Empire & Qing Dynasty	1909	Qingdao
School of Higher Learning (Chinese: 山东高等学校; pinyin: Shāndōng Gāoděng Xuéxiào)		1911	Jinan
Shandong Provincial Law and Politics College		1914	Jinan
Shandong Provincial Industrial College		1914	Jinan
Shandong Provincial Commercial College		1914	Jinan
Shandong Provincial Medical College		1920	Jinan
Shandong Provincial College of Mineralogy		1920	Jinan
Qingdao University	(Private)	1924	Qingdao
Shandong Provincial University (Chinese: 省立山东大学; pinyin: Shěnglì Shāndōng Dàxué)	Warlord Zhang Zongchang	1926	Jinan
National Shandong University (simplified Chinese: 国立山东大学; traditional Chinese: 國立山東大學; pinyin: Guólì Shāndōng Dàxué)	Republic of China	1932	Qingdao
University Property Protection Committee of National Shandong University	Republic of China	1938	Sichuan
Huazhong Construction University	Chinese Communist Party	1944	Jiangsu
Linyi Shandong University	Chinese Communist Party	1945	Linyi
National Shandong University	Republic of China	1946	Qingdao
Huadong (East China) University (Chinese: 华东大学; pinyin: Huádōng Dàxué)		1948	Weixian (today the city of Weifang)
Shandong University		1951	Qingdao
Qingdao Medical College		1956	Qingdao
Shandong College of Oceanography (now Ocean University of China, Qingdao)		1959	Qingdao
Shandong University (simplified Chinese: 山东大学; traditional Chinese: 山東大學; pinyin: Shāndōng Dàxué)		1958	Jinan
Liberal Arts Departments are combined with Qufu Teachers College	Revolutionary Committee of Shandong Province	1970	Qufu
Department of Biology becomes part of Shandong Agricultural College	Revolutionary Committee of Shandong Province	1970	Tai'an
Department of Science and the Administration built into Shandong University of Science and Technology	Revolutionary Committee of Shandong Province	1970	Jinan
Shandong University	P.R. China	1974	Jinan

== Reputation and ranking ==
University rankings
BCUR National	Domestic	22
Wu Shulian National	Domestic	14
CUAA National	Alumni	16
QS National	General	18
THE National	General	19
QS Asia (Asia version)	General	75
ARWU World	Research	101–150
QS World	General	=339
THE World	General	251–300
USNWR World	General	=238

Shandong University was one of the Project 985 universities in China to appear in the world's top 500 universities in the first global university ranking in 2003, according to the Academic Ranking of World Universities. The joint THE-QS World University Rankings 2005 ranked Shandong University =282nd in the world. In the general university ranking performed by the Chinese University Alumni Association (CUAA), Shandong University ranked number 14 among Top 100 Chinese universities in 2010. It reached the 11th highest score in the "teaching" category of this ranking. Shandong University's engineering programs have also been ranked number 15 nationwide by the Research Center of Management and Science in China (2008). For the last 10 years, Shandong University has been continuously ranked among the top 10 universities nationwide in terms of the number of publications included in the Science Citation Index. Research at Shandong University is deemed particular strong in the areas of physics, mathematics, and medicine. A ranking by Mines ParisTech based on the number of alumni holding CEO position in Fortune Global 500 companies placed Shandong University first within China.

The 2024 CWTS Leiden Ranking ranked Shandong University at 15th in the world based on their publications for the time period 2019–2022. In 2024, it ranked 59th among the universities around the world by SCImago Institutions Rankings. Shandong University ranked 18th among the leading universities globally in the Nature Index 2025 Annual Tables by Nature Research, that measure the high-quality research published in 82 high-quality science journals. The Academic Ranking of World Universities, also known as the "Shanghai Ranking", placed the university 101st-150th in the world. Shandong University ranked 168th worldwide and 36th in Asia in the CWUR World University Ranking 2025.

Latest Results of National Discipline Assessment by Ministry of Education of PRC
Department	Assessment
Mathematics	A+
Chinese Language and Literature	A
Marxist Theory	A
Applied Economics	A−
Foreign Language and Literature	A−
Control Science and Engineering	A−
Pharmacy	A−
Business Administration	A−
Philosophy	B+
Theoretical Economics	B+
Law	B+
Political Science	B+
Archaeology	B+
Chinese History	B+
Physics	B+
Chemistry	B+
Biology	B+
Statistics	B+
Mechanical Engineering	B+
Material Science	B+
Electrical Engineering	B+
Computer Science and Technology	B+
Civil Engineering	B+
Environmental Science and Engineering	B+
Software Engineering	B+
Basic Medicine	B+
Clinical Medicine	B+
Nursing	B+
Power Engineering and Engineering Thermophysics	B
Information and Communication Engineering	B
Stomatology	B
Public Health and Preventive Medicine	B
Management Science and Engineering	B
Public Administration	B
Sociology	B−
Journalism and Communication	B−
Ecology	B−
Optical Engineering	B−
Electronic Science and Technology	B−
World History	C+
Chemical Engineering and Technology	C+
Biomedical Engineering	C+
Mechanics	C
Water Conservancy Engineering	C

== Administration ==
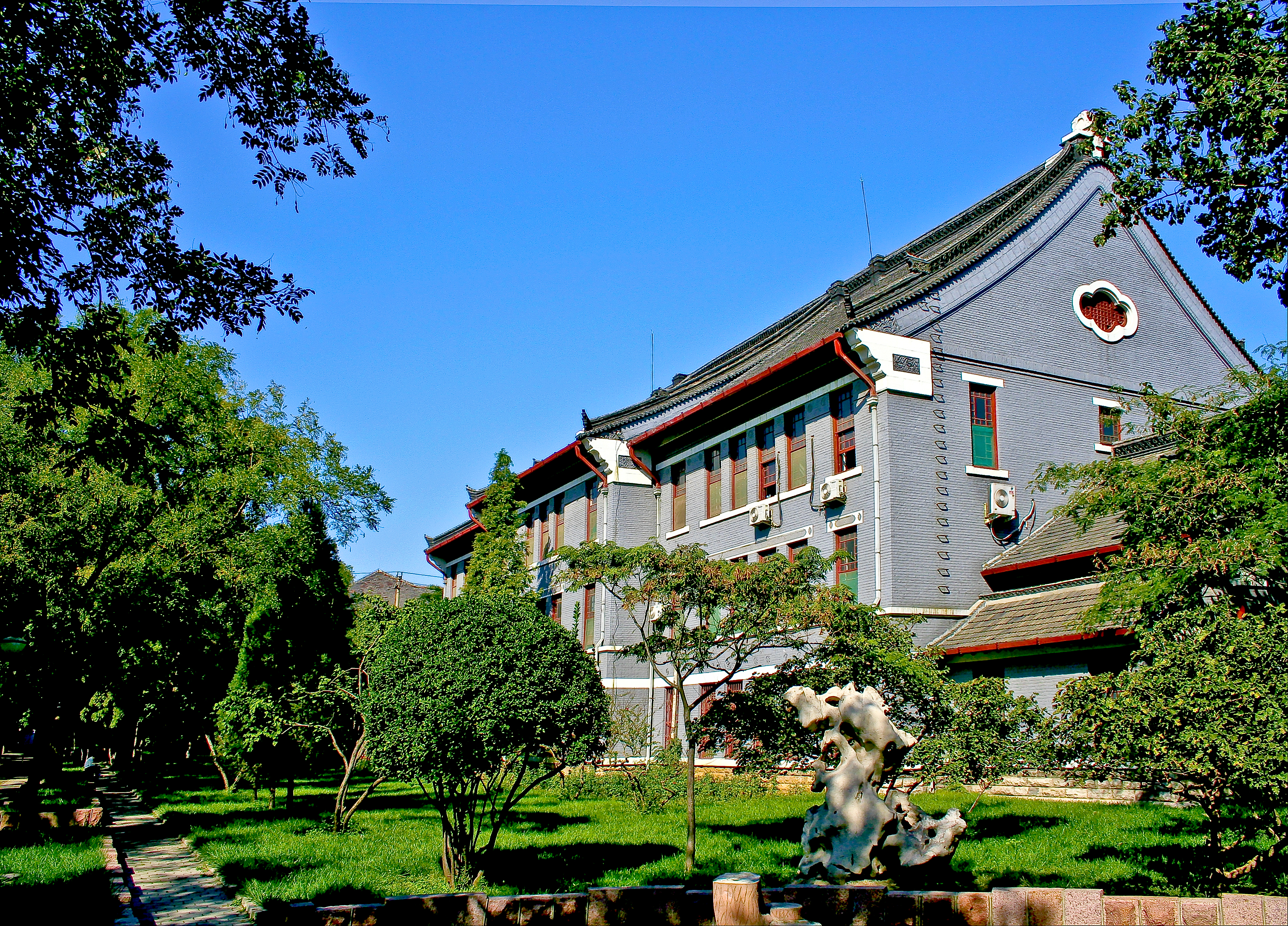
Historical building on the Baotuquan Campus

At the top level, Shandong University is governed by a president (Chinese: 校长; pinyin: Xiàozhǎng) and a cabinet of vice presidents (Chinese: 副校长; pinyin: Fù Xiàozhǎng), each with a specific portfolio of responsibilities (e.g., research, international exchange). Central administrative departments (e.g., for finance, human resources, research, or international affairs) are led by a director (Chinese: 处长; pinyin: Chùzhǎng). Below the central administration, the university is organized by subject area into 31 faculties that are referred to as "Schools" (Chinese: 学院; pinyin: Xuéyuàn) as well as a graduate school. Each school is headed by a dean (Chinese: 院长; pinyin: Yuànzhǎng) and may be divided further into departments headed by a chairperson. Academic programs are offered in 11 main disciplines: philosophy, economics, law, literature, history, natural sciences, engineering, management, medicine, education, and military science. There are 104 undergraduate degree programs, 209 master's degree programs, and 127 doctoral degree programs. In addition, there are seven professional master's degree programs in law, business management, engineering, clinical medicine, public health, dentistry, and public administration.

The student population is around 57,500 full-time students, of which 14,500 are postgraduate students, and over 1,000 are foreign students (data from 2009).

The major research efforts at Shandong University are organized in 34 national, provincial, and ministerial key academic disciplines, two national key research labs, 21 provincial and ministerial key research labs, a national engineering and technology promotion center, 10 provincial technology research centers, three national basic scientific research and personnel development bases; three social science key research bases approved by Ministry of Education; and three national fundamental science personnel development bases. Among its faculty are 23 members (including adjuncts) of the Chinese Academy of Sciences and the Chinese Academy of Engineering. Three general hospitals, including Qilu Hospital, and 12 teaching hospitals are affiliated with the university. The university library houses a collection of over 3,550,000 items.

=== Schools and departments ===
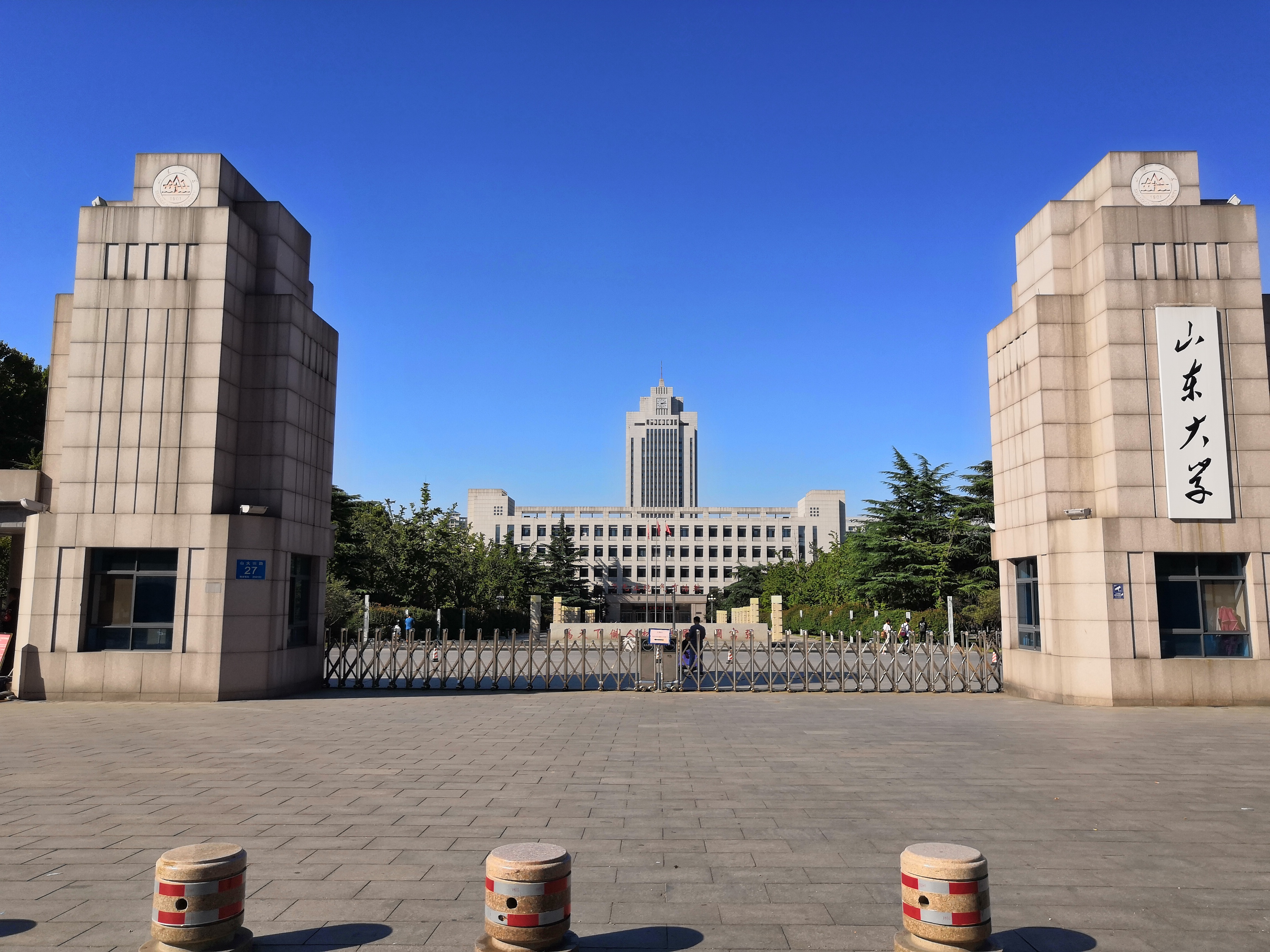
Central campus

- School of Business Administration
- School of Chemistry and Chemical Engineering
- School of Civil Engineering
- School of Computer Science and Technology
- School of Control Science and Engineering
- School of Dentistry
- School of Economics
- School of Electrical Engineering
- School of Energy and Power Engineering
- School of Environmental Science and Engineering
- School of Fine Arts
- School of Foreign Languages and Literature
- School of History and Culture
- School of Information Science and Engineering
- School of International Education
- School of Journalism
- School of Law
- School of Life Science
- School of Literature and Journalism
- School of Macroelectronics
- School of Marxist Theory Education
- School of Materials Science and Engineering
- School of Mathematics and System Sciences
- School of Mechanical Engineering
- School of Medicine
- School of Nursing
- School of Pharmacy
- School of Philosophy and Social Development
- School of Physical Education
- School of Physics
- School of Political Science and Public Administration
- School of Public Health
- Taishan College (honor school)
- Nishan College (honor school)
- General Study Program

== Campuses ==
Shandong University has a total of seven campuses. All but two of them are located in Jinan, the capital city of Shandong Province. Together they cover an area of 3.8 km^{2}. There are two campuses outside Jinan, one is located in Qingdao, and another is in Weihai.

Current campuses of Shandong University
Current name	Old name	Address and location
Central Campus (Chinese: 中心校区; pinyin: Zhōngxīn Xiàoqū)	East New Campus (Chinese: 东新校区; pinyin: Dōng Xīn Xiàoqū)	27 Shanda Nanlu, Jinan, 36°40′25″N 117°3′14″E
Hongjialou Campus (Chinese: 洪家楼校区; pinyin: Hóngjiālóu Xiàoqū)	East Old Campus (Chinese: 东老校区; pinyin: Dōng Lǎo Xiàoqū)	5 Hongjialou, Jinan, 36°41′9″N 117°3′41″E
Baotuquan Campus (Chinese: 趵突泉校区; pinyin: Bàotūquán Xiàoqū)	West Campus (Chinese: 西校区; pinyin: Xī Xiàoqū), formerly the campus of Cheeloo University	44 Wenhua Xilu, Jinan, 36°39′11″N 117°0′43″E
Qianfoshan Campus (Chinese: 千佛山校区; pinyin: Qiānfóshān Xiàoqū)	South Campus (Chinese: 南校区; pinyin: Nán Xiàoqū), formerly the campus of the Shandong University of Technology	17923 Jingshi Road, Jinan, 36°39′5″N 117°1′20″E
Xinglongshan Campus (Chinese: 兴隆山校区; pinyin: Xīnglóngshān Xiàoqū)	New South Campus (Chinese: 南新区; pinyin: Nán Xīn Qū)	2550 Erhuan Donglu, Jinan, 36°35′55″N 117°2′38″E
Ruanjianyuan Campus ((Chinese: 软件园校区; pinyin: Ruǎnjiànyuán Xiàoqū))	Qilu Software College Campus (Chinese: 齐鲁软件学院; pinyin: Qǐlǔ Ruǎnjiàn Xuéyuàn)	Shunhua Road, Jinan, 36°40′0″N 117°7′57″E
Weihai Campus (Chinese: 威海校区; pinyin: Wēihǎi Xiàoqū)		180 Wenhua Xilu, Weihai, 37°31′49″N 122°3′19″E
Qingdao Campus (Chinese: 青岛校区; pinyin: Qīngdǎo Xiàoqū, satellite campus, first phase inaugurated September 2016, under construction)		Aoshanwei Town, Qingdao

=== Central Campus ===
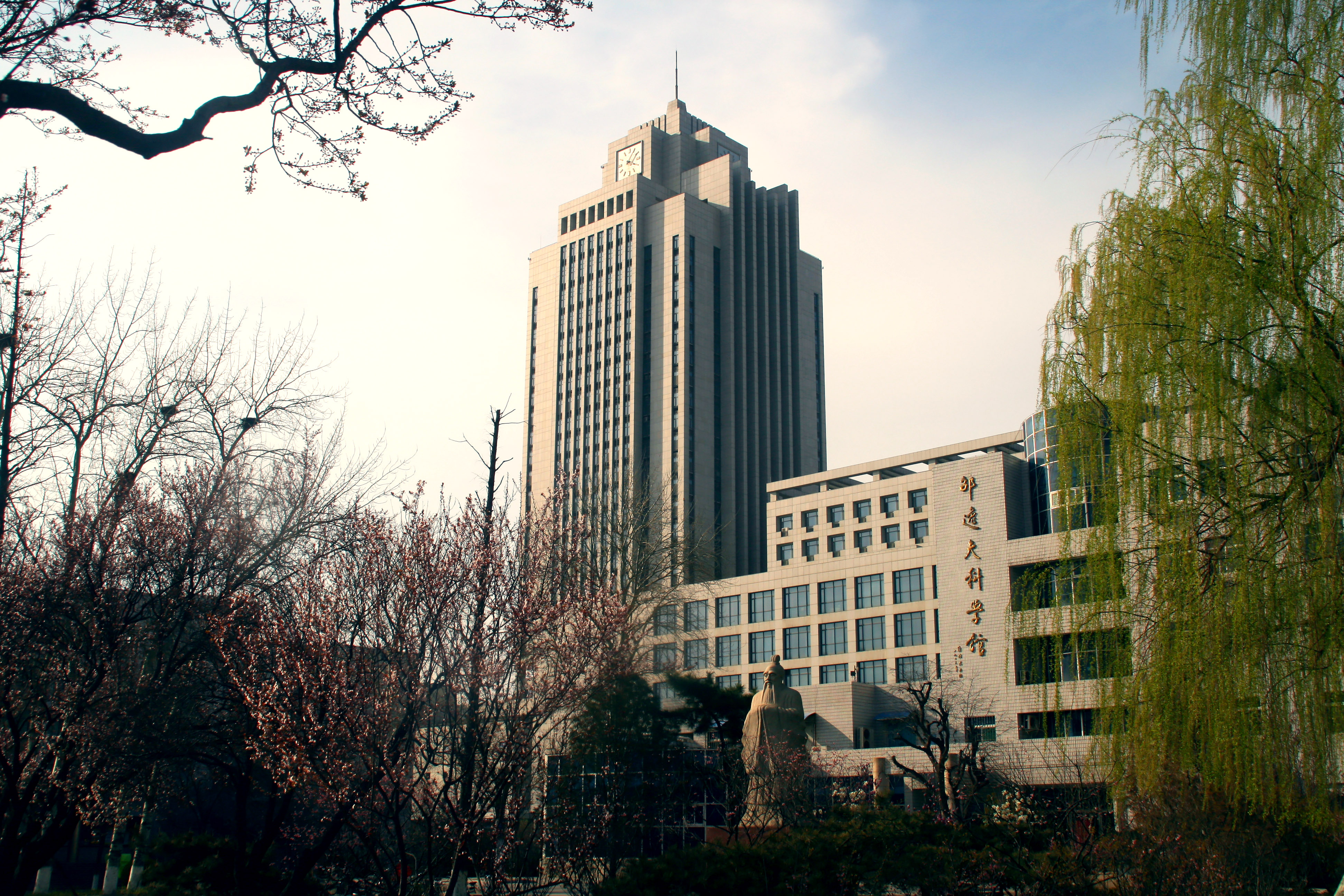
Integrated Research Building (Chinese: 知新楼; pinyin: Zhīxīn Lóu; lit. 'know what is new building'), completed in 2010, seen from the southeast in March 2013.

Construction of the Central Campus commenced in 1959, about a year after the university had moved back from Qingdao to Jinan and during a time that coincided with the Great Leap Forward, the Great Chinese Famine, as well as a devastating flood of the Yellow River (in July 1959). The Central Campus houses the central administration (in the Mingde Building, Chinese: 明德楼; pinyin: Míngdé Lóu), the main university library, a large dining hall, as well as student dormitories. The central campus is home to the schools of Chemistry and Chemical Engineering, Environmental Engineering, Economics, History and Culture, Marxism–Leninism, Life Sciences, Mathematics and System Science, Literature and Journalism and Communication, as well as Information Science and Engineering. One of Shandong University's hotels (Chinese: 山东大学学术交流中心; pinyin: Shāndōng Dàxué Xuéshù Jiāoliú Zhōngxīn, or for short: "Xueren Dasha", Chinese: 学人大厦; pinyin: Xuérén Dàshà) is also located on the central campus. The roads within the Central Campus are named after concepts from Confucianism.

=== Hongjialou Campus ===
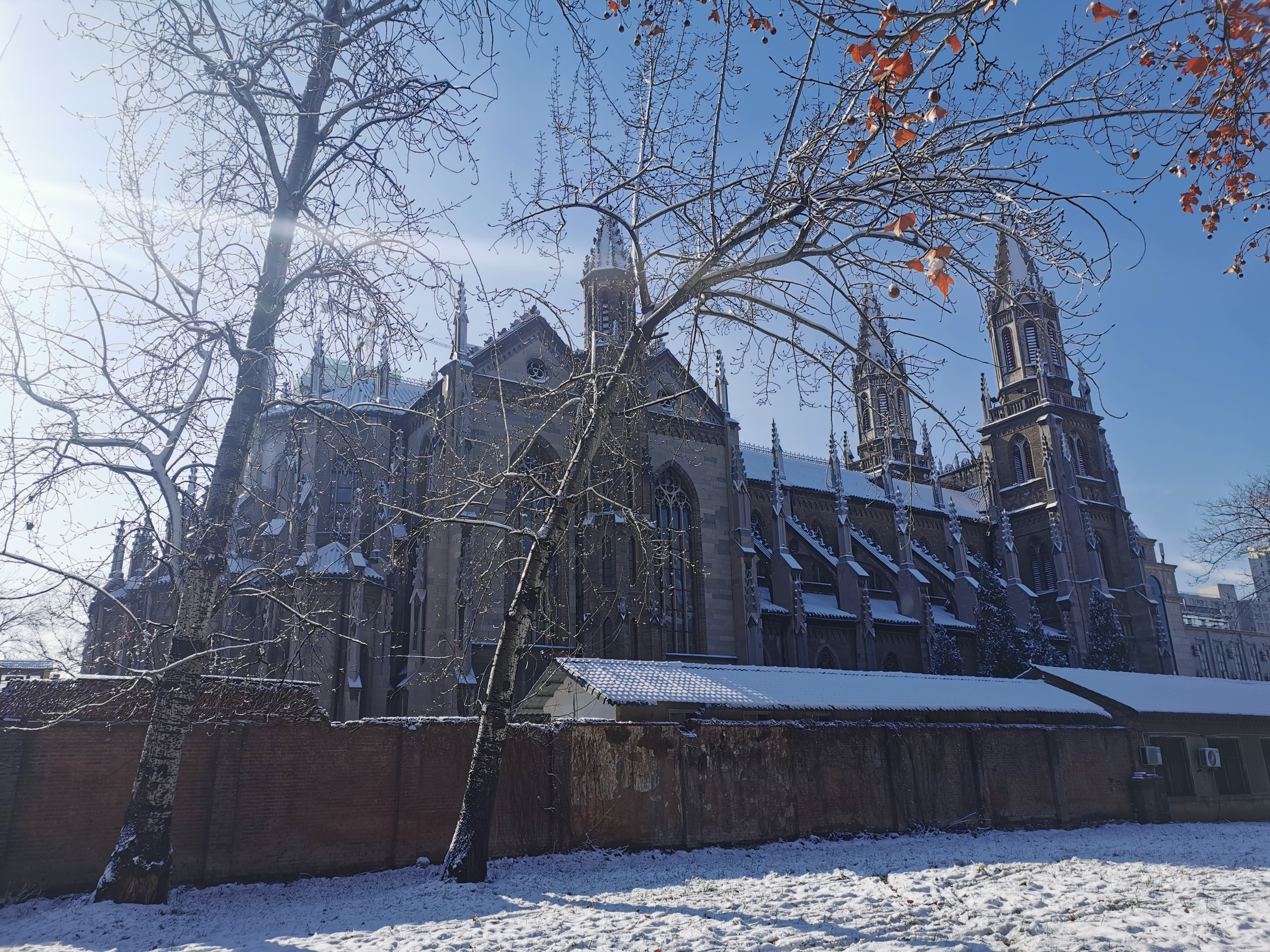
Sacred Heart Cathedral on Hongjialou Square that borders immediately on the Hongjialou Campus.

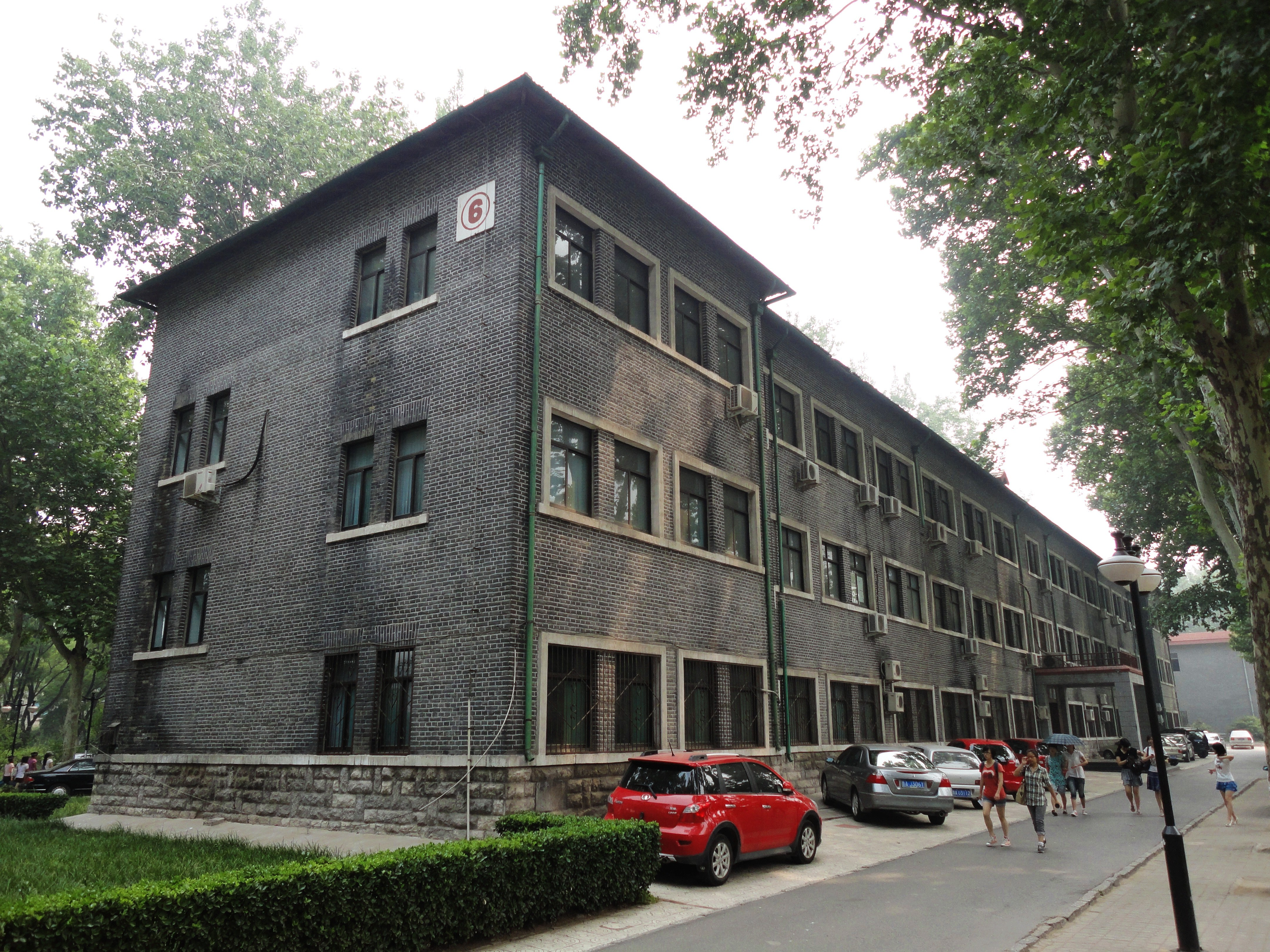
Former School of Philosophy and Social Development in Shandong University Hongjialou Campus

The Hongjialou Campus derives its name from the Hongjialou Square and is located immediately to the north and east of the Square and the Sacred Heart Cathedral (Chinese: 洪家楼耶稣圣心主教座堂; pinyin: Hóngjiālóu Yēsū Shèngxīn Zhǔjiào Zuòtáng). The first construction on the campus dates back to 1936 when it was used for the Jinan Yifan Girls' Middle School (Chinese: 懿范女子中学; pinyin: Yìfàn Nǚzǐ Zhōngxué) that was operated by Franciscan sisters (Chinese: 艾修女; pinyin: ài xiū nǚ) of the Archdiocese of Jinan. In 1948, the Yifan Girls' Middle School was combined with Liming Middle School (Chinese: 黎明中学; pinyin: Límíng Zhōngxué) and its former campus became part of the Shandong Agricultural Institute that used it until 1958, when the Institute moved to Tai'an. In October 1958, the Hongjialou Campus became Shandong University's first Campus after the university moved back to Jinan from Qingdao. The Hongjialou Campus houses the Schools of Law, Foreign Languages and Literature as well as Fine Arts.

=== Baotuquan Campus ===
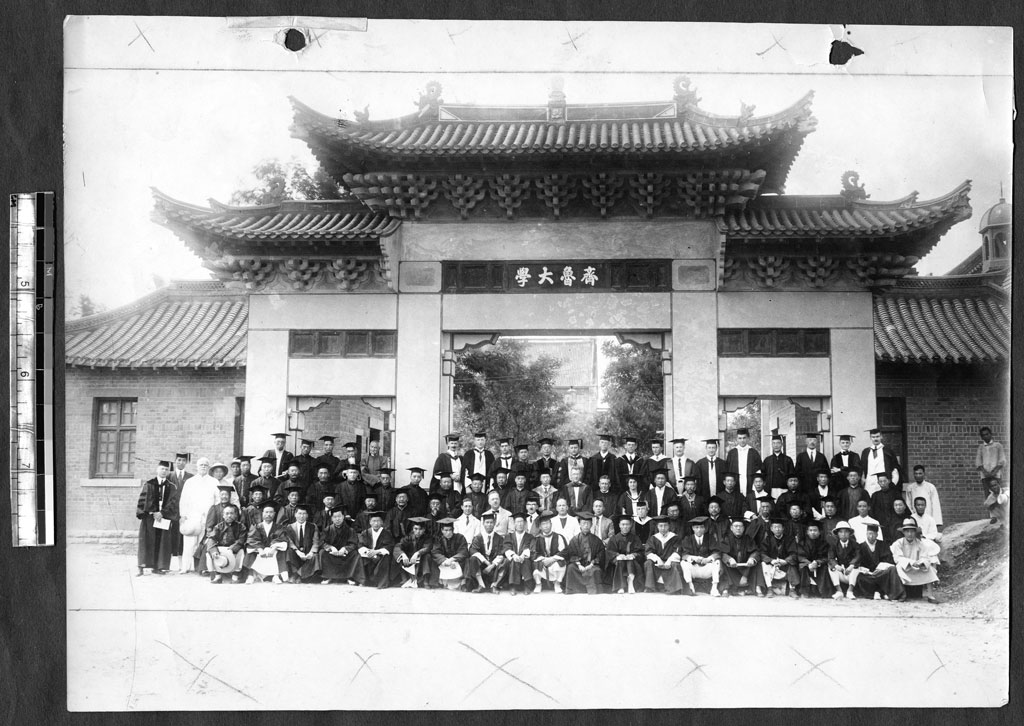
The newly-completed Alumni Gate in 1924 with graduates from Cheeloo University

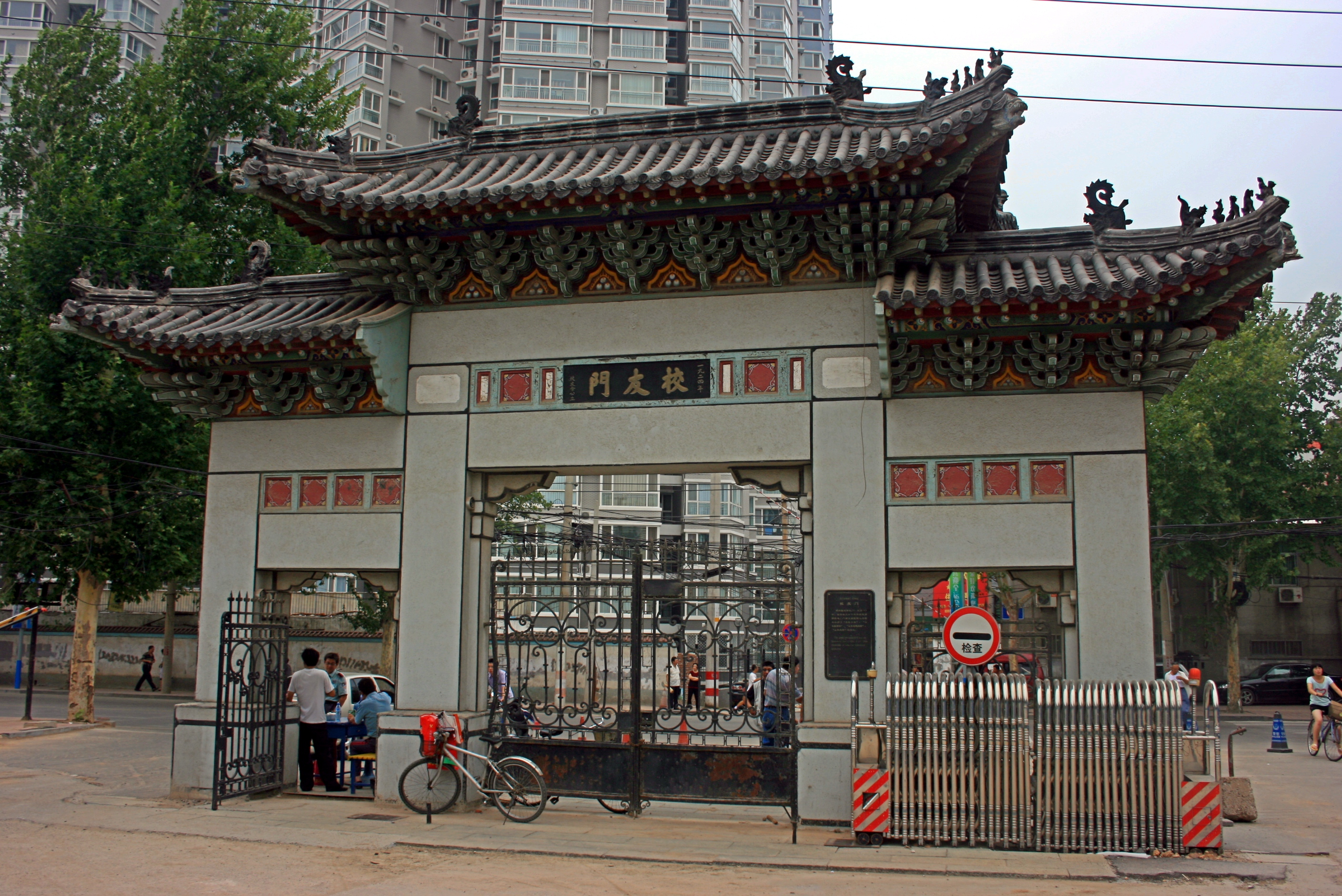
The Alumni Gate, which is now in Baotuquan Campus, in 2005

The Baotuquan Campus is the former campus of Cheeloo University and was established in 1909. The design for the campus was made by Perkins, Fellows and Hamilton, an architectural firm from Chicago renowned for its school buildings in the "Prairie School" style. The American architects attempted to include Chinese architectural features into the design of the buildings on the new Cheeloo University campus in Jinan. They did, however, mistakenly assume that the roof shape was the only distinguishing feature of Chinese architecture. As a result, the buildings feature Chinese-style roofs on buildings that lack the matching support elements such as wooden Dougong brackets that characterize Chinese architecture. Historical buildings on the Baotuquan Campus include the Bergen Science Hall (Chinese: 柏尔根楼; pinyin: Bǎi'ěrgēn Lóu, formerly for Chemistry and Biology), the Mateer Science Hall (formerly for Physics and Physiology), the McCormick Hall, and the Alumni Gate (the former main entrance, construction completed on June 17, 1924). Baotuquan Campus houses the schools of public health, nursing, dentistry, pharmacy, and medicine.

=== Qianfoshan Campus ===
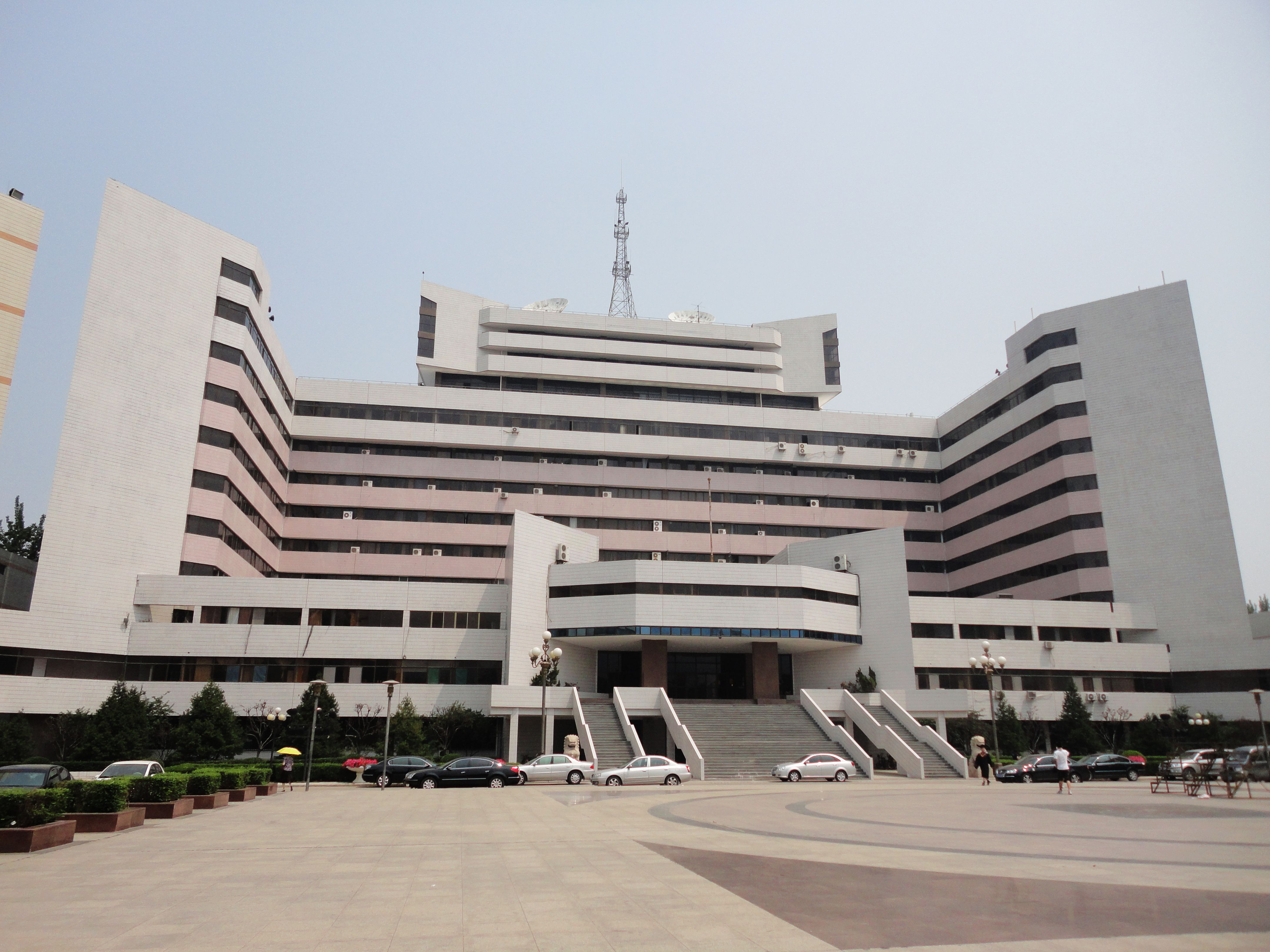
Main building on the Qianfoshan Campus.

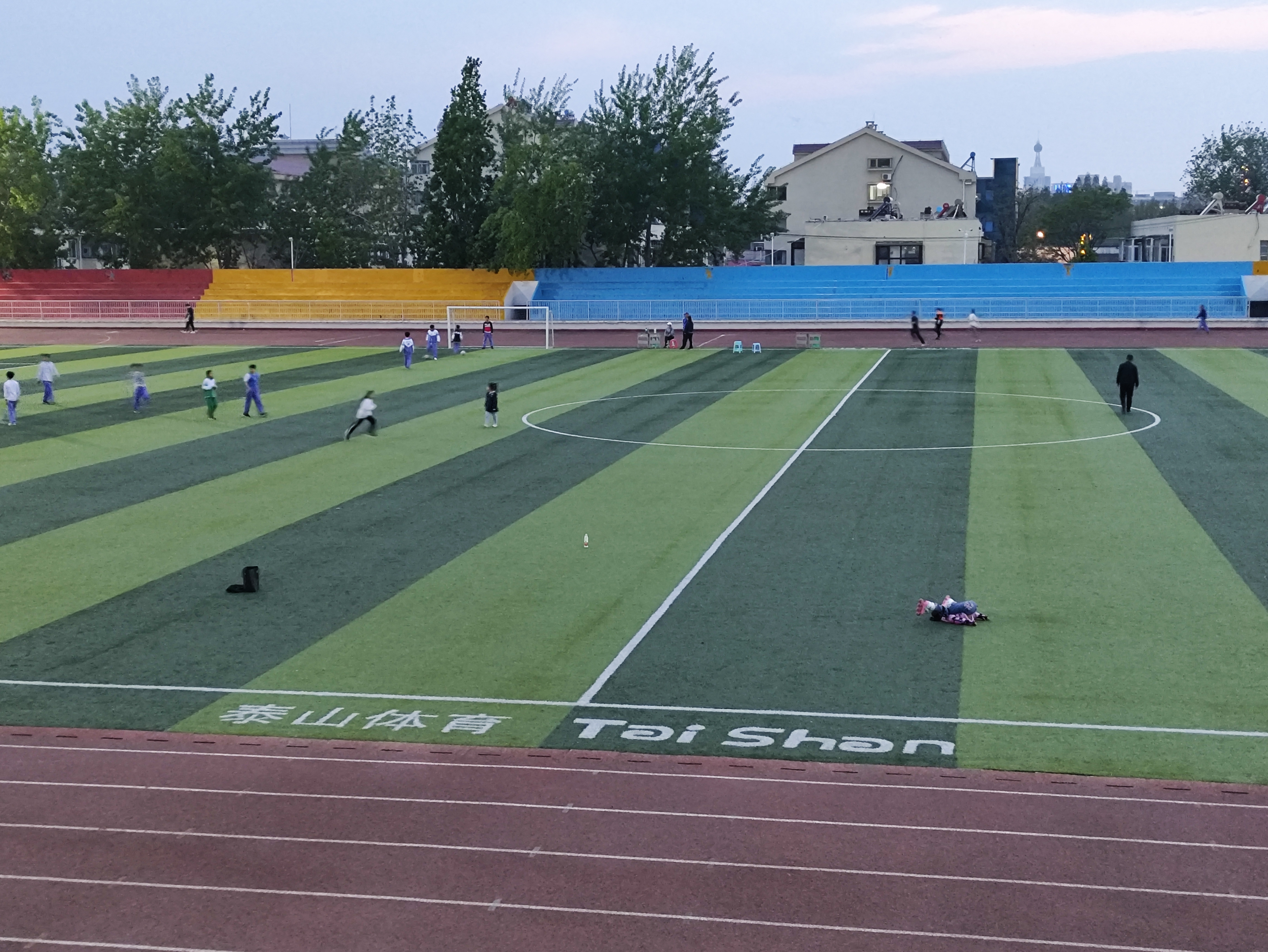
Shandong University Qianfoshan Campus South Stadium

The Qianfoshan Campus was established in 1949 and served as the campus of Shandong University of Technology. It became a part of Shandong University when Shandong University of Technology was merged into Shandong University in July 2000. The campus has a total area of about 420,000 square meters and remains exclusively dedicated to engineering. It is home to the schools of Materials Science and Engineering, Electrical Engineering, Mechanical Engineering, Computer Science and Technology, Control Science and Engineering, Energy and Power Engineering, Physical Education, as well as Civil Engineering. The roads on the Qianfoshan Campus are named after famous engineers and inventors from China as well as abroad.

=== Xinglongshan Campus ===
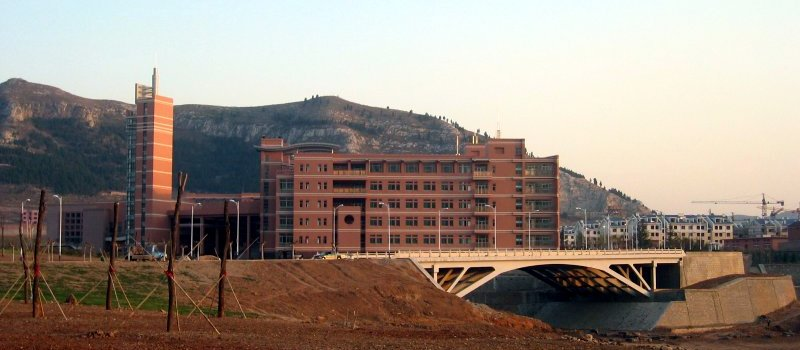
Xinglongshan Campus in 2005

The Xinglongshan Campus is the newest campus of Shandong University and also its largest campus in Jinan with an area of about 769,000 square meters. Construction of the campus started in March 2003 and its first facilities were ready for use in August 2004. The campus is used to house first- and second-year students of nine different departments. The Xinglongshan Campus also houses a Student Associations Activity Center with a total floor space of about 2000 square meters.

=== Qilu Software College Campus ===
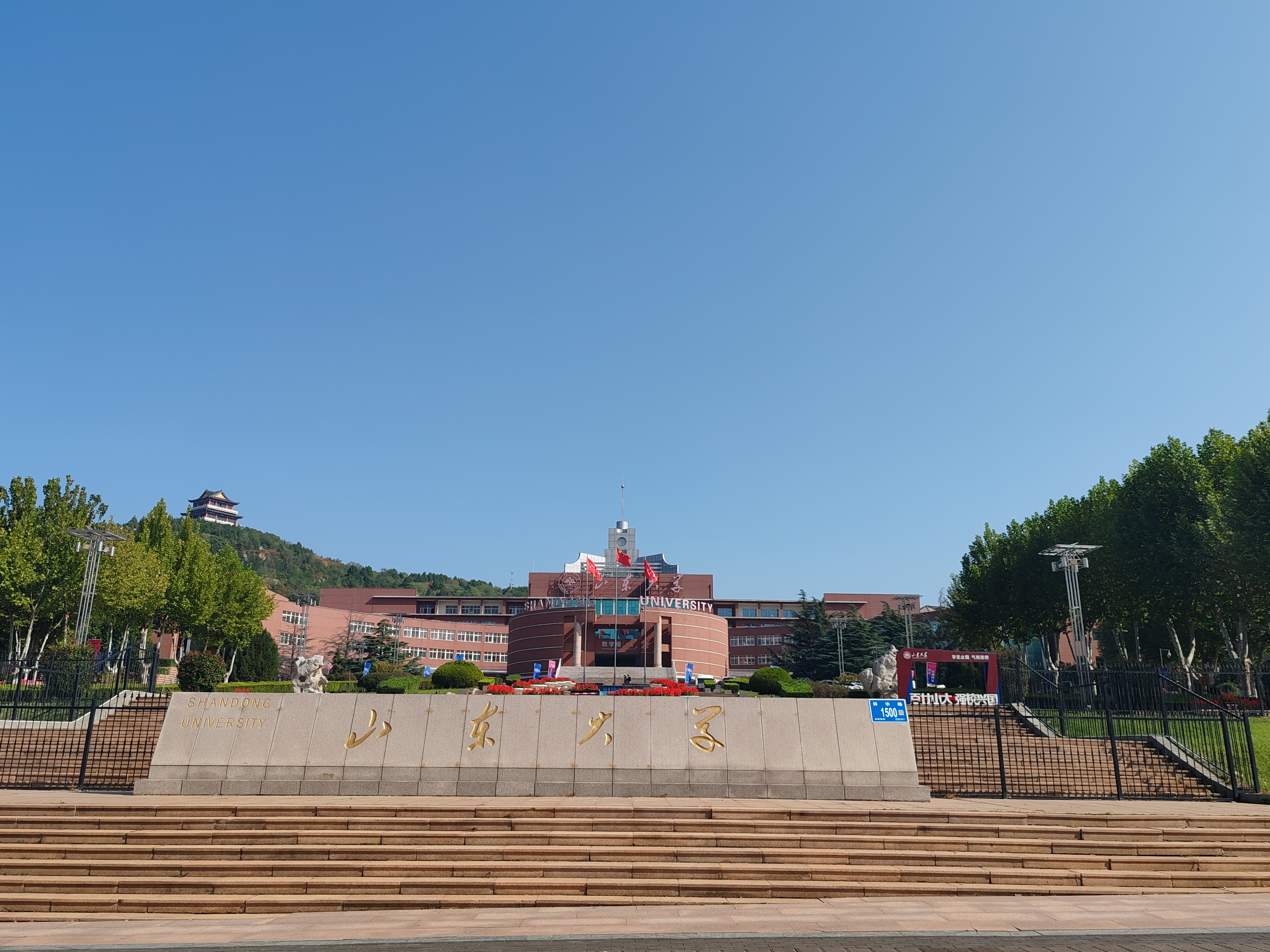
Qilu Software College Campus

The Qilu Software College Campus is home to the School of Computer Science and Technology as well as to the university's Software College. Campus construction started in July 2001 and the campus now has a total area of about 267,000 square meters. More than 3,000 students live on the Qilu Software College Campus. The campus is located next to a cluster of commercial software ventures, such as the China International ICT Innovation Cluster (CIIIC) and shares educational resources with these businesses.

=== Weihai Campus ===
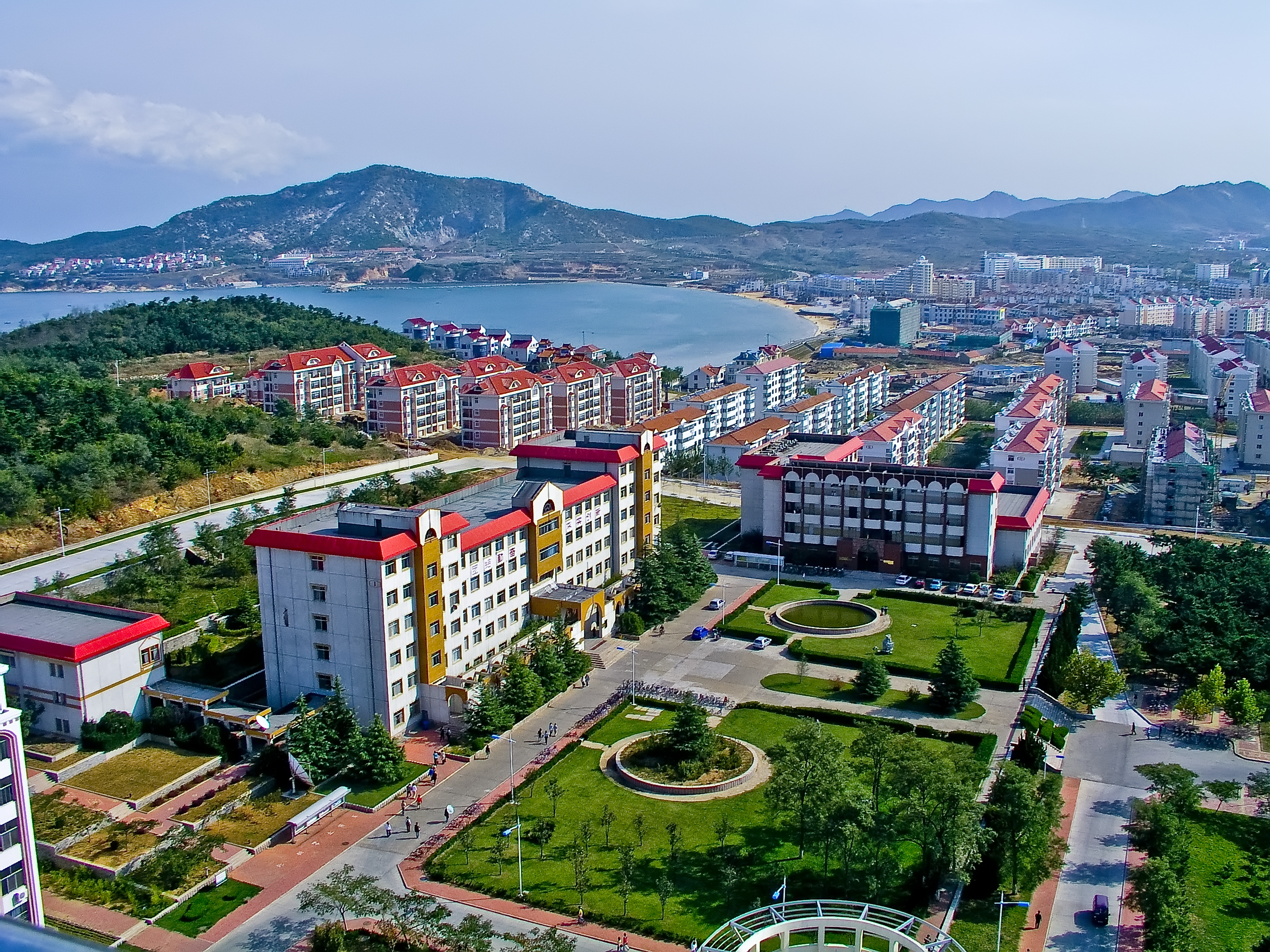
Shandong University Weihai Campus

Shandong University Weihai Campus was established in 1984, its campus covers a total area of about 1 million square meters, making it the largest campus of Shandong University. Shandong University Weihai Campus is organized in 13 departments that include the College of Korean Studies, the Business School, the Law School, the School of Journalism and Communication, the Art Institute, the College of Ocean Science, the School of Information Engineering, the School of Electrical and Mechanical Engineering, the Institute of Space Science and Physics, the Mathematics and Statistics Institute, the School of International Education, and the College of Vocational and Technical Training.It also established Weihai Institute for Interdisciplinary Research,Shandong University . To the west of the Weihai campus lies the Shandong University Academic Center, a beach-front hotel and conference center.

=== Qingdao Campus ===
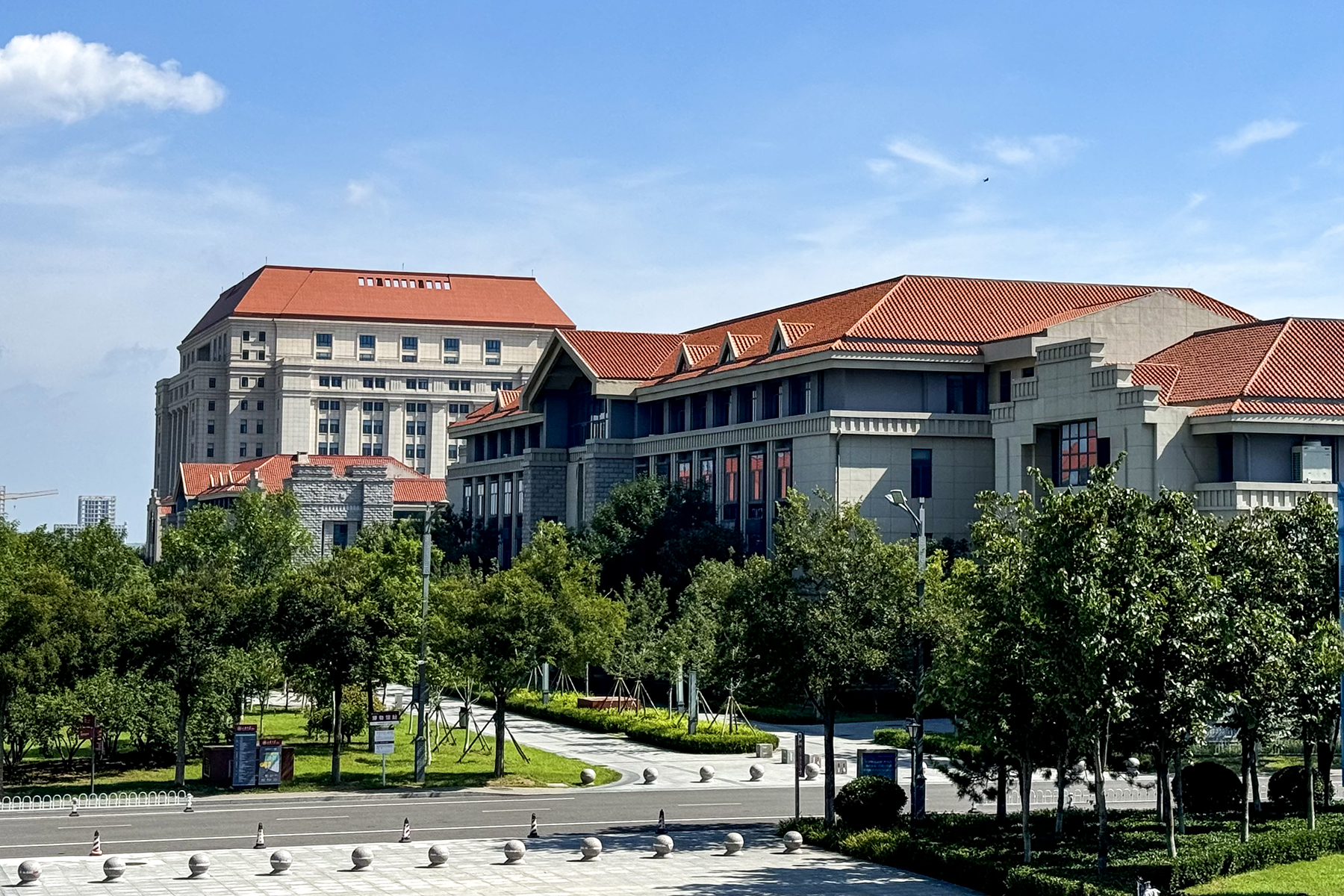
Qingdao Campus of Shandong University

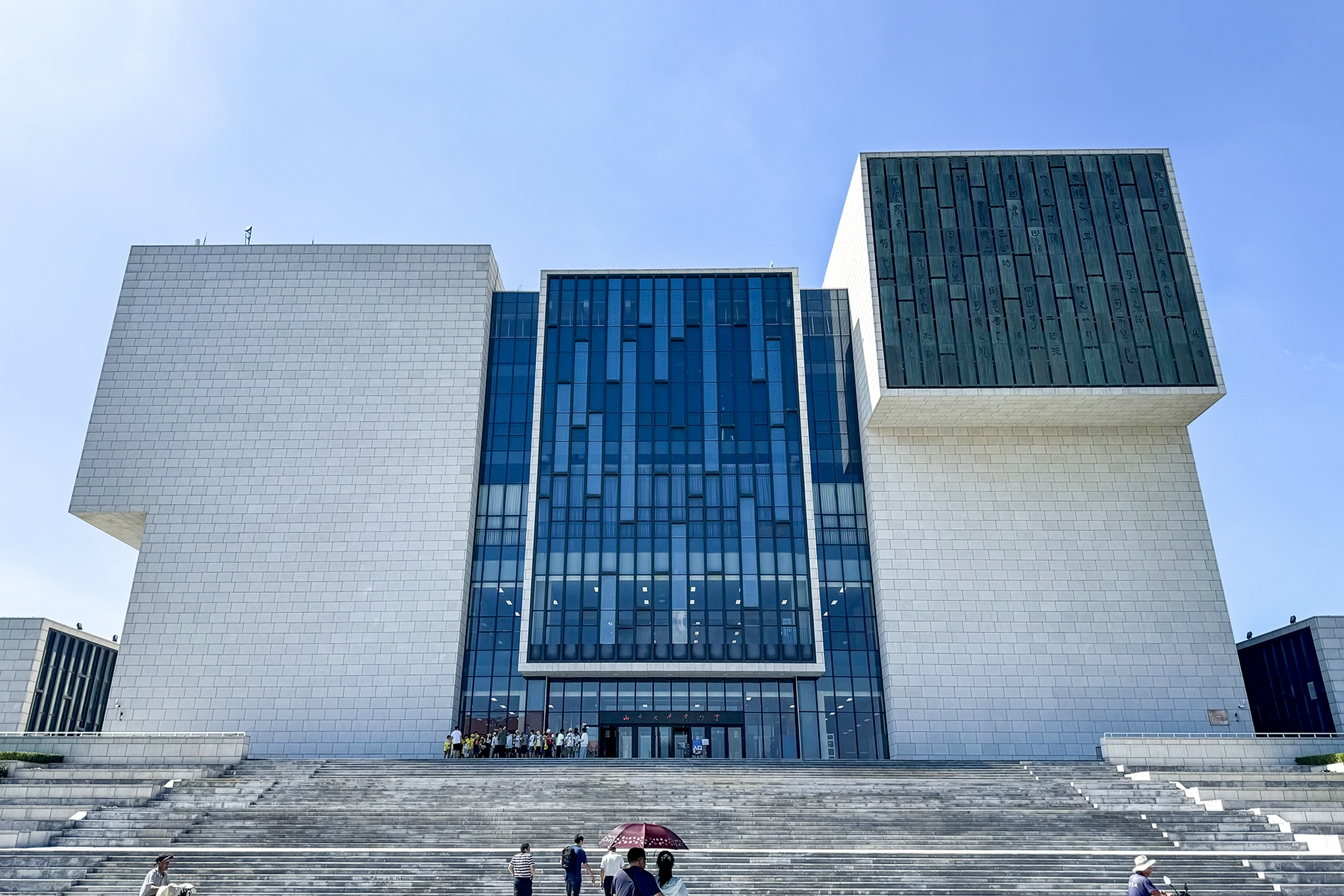
Shandong University Museum at Qingdao Campus

Construction of the Qingdao Campus started in March 2011 and the first development phase was inaugurated in September 2016. The campus is located north of Xingshi Zhuang Village (Chinese: 星石庄村; pinyin: Xīngshízhuāng Cūn) in Aoshanwei Town (Chinese: 鳌山卫镇; pinyin: Áoshānwèi Zhèn) that is part of Jimo City and located to the northeast of Qingdao. The campus site is immediately adjacent to the seashore of Aoshan Bay and the coastal highway (Chinese: 滨海大道; pinyin: Bīnhǎi dàdào). The total planning area covers about two million square meters, 43 percent of which are included in the first construction phase. When completed, the Qingdao Campus will have a capacity of 30,000 students; recruitment of the first class of 5,000 freshman students is planned for the fall of 2013. The construction cost is estimated at 800 million Chinese Yuan (about 124 million US Dollars). The architecture of the new campus is intended to blend Chinese and western elements. Many buildings will incorporate the red roofs and other building style elements of the German colonial architecture in Qingdao. The master plan for the campus was developed by Perkins Eastman (New York). One of the founders of Perkins Eastman, Bradford Perkins is the grandson of Dwight H. Perkins, whose firm (Perkins, Fellows, & Hamilton) designed the Cheeloo University campus in Jinan. The campus will be dedicated to advanced science and engineering research, with a special emphasis on interfacing with high-tech industry and international academic collaboration. It is part of a plan to give Shandong University a presence that is distributed throughout the province in a manner that is comparable to the University of California system, but retains a greater level of central control.

Major Campuses of Shandong University

== International cooperation ==
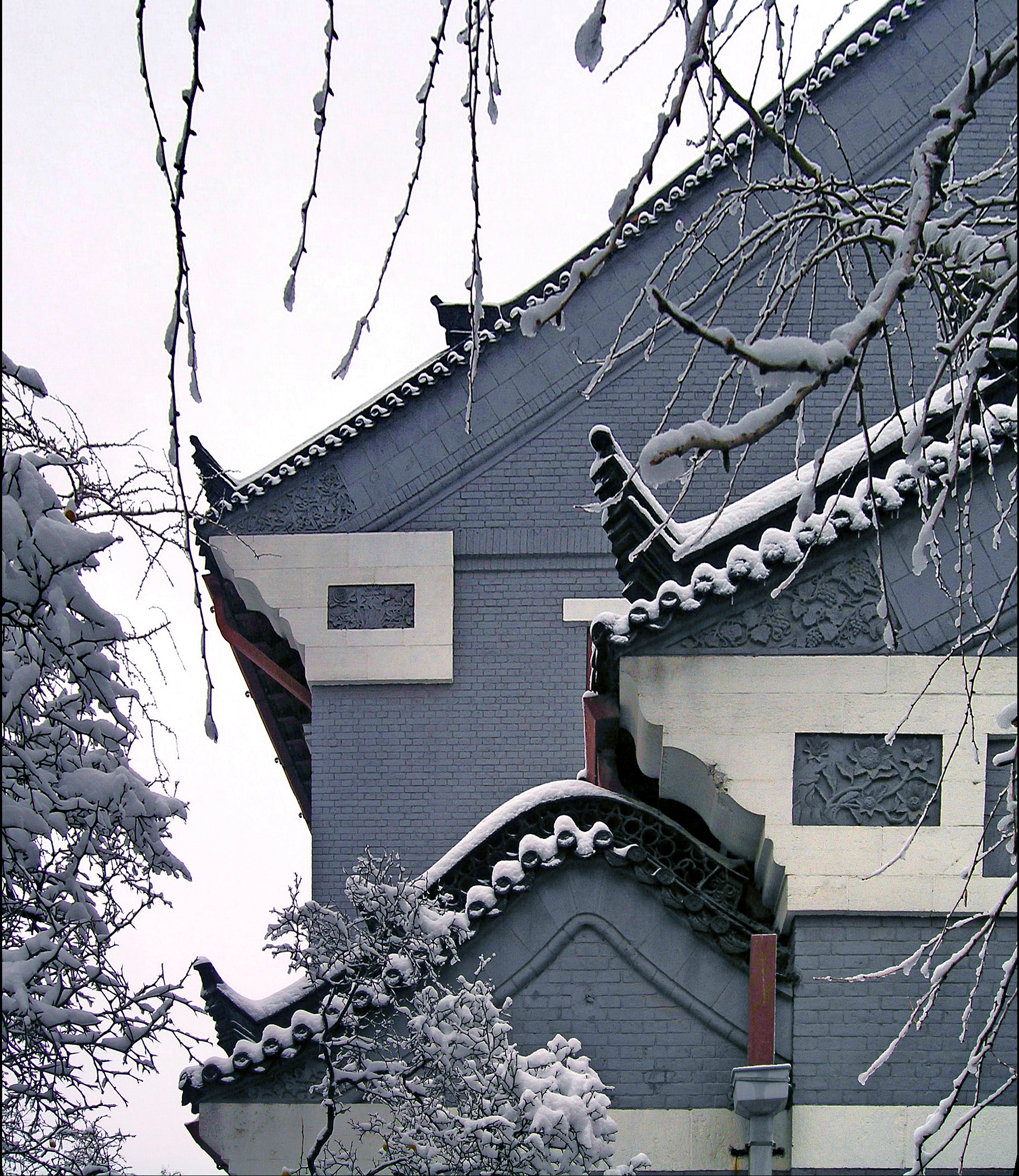
Building on the Baotuquan Campus in winter.

Shandong University has established an international network for educational cooperation and has signed exchange agreements with over 70 universities from over 50 countries. Shandong also is associated in a sister school for American Middle Schools and Junior Highs, including Scofield Magnet Middle School. Among its faculty are international researchers and scholars, who either visit for a short term (less than 1 month, 160 visitors in 2009), a medium term (less than half a year, 70 visitors in 2009), or for the long term (more than half a year, 80 visitors in 2009). Of the 80 long-term international faculty members, 30 language scholars teach languages such as English, Japanese, Korean, French, German, Spanish, and Russian. The others are active in disciplines such as philosophy, biology, chemistry, physics, law, international politics and economics, as well as Chinese classics and traditional philosophy.

About 1500 international students from about 40 countries come to study at Shandong University each year. An international student population numbering more than 1000 can be found on campus at any given time during the semester. Most of these international students come from Asian and African countries, but there are also students from Europe, the United States, Canada, and Australia. Since 1980, Shandong University has received more than 10,000 students from over 60 countries. Popular study subjects are Chinese language and culture, but also economics and medicine. Furthermore, Shandong University participates in international short term exchange programs and receives approximately 2500 international student visitors for such programs per year.

In 2006, Shandong University created a joint urban research center with the University of Cincinnati in the United States, and a presence on each other's campus. An International Laboratory operated in the a partnership with Virginia Tech was inaugurated in the Integrated Research Building on the Central Campus in August 2010. The laboratory focuses on a biophysics and engineering analysis of biological model systems drawn from China's biodiversity. Shandong University is a partner university of the Study China Programme, which is coordinated by the University of Manchester and funded by the UK Department for Business, Innovation and Skills.

== Research centers ==
=== State Key Laboratories ===
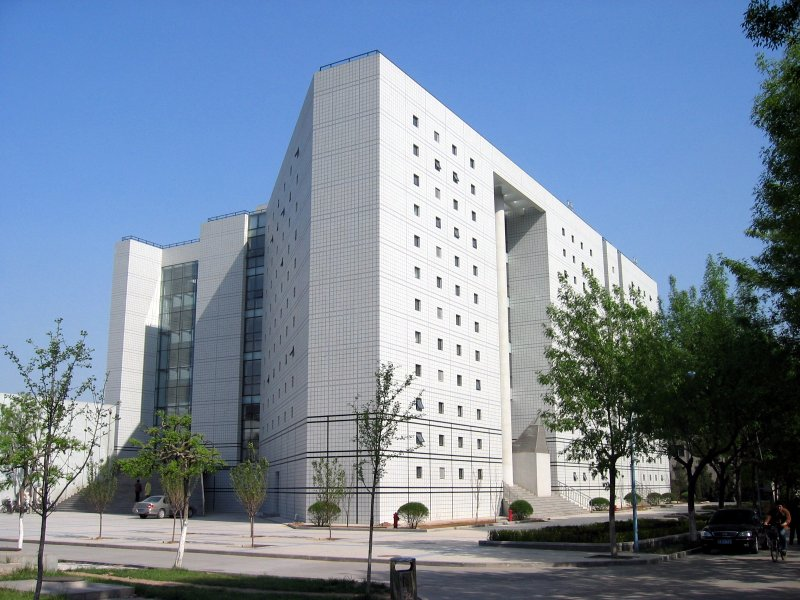
Building of the State Key Laboratory for Crystal Materials

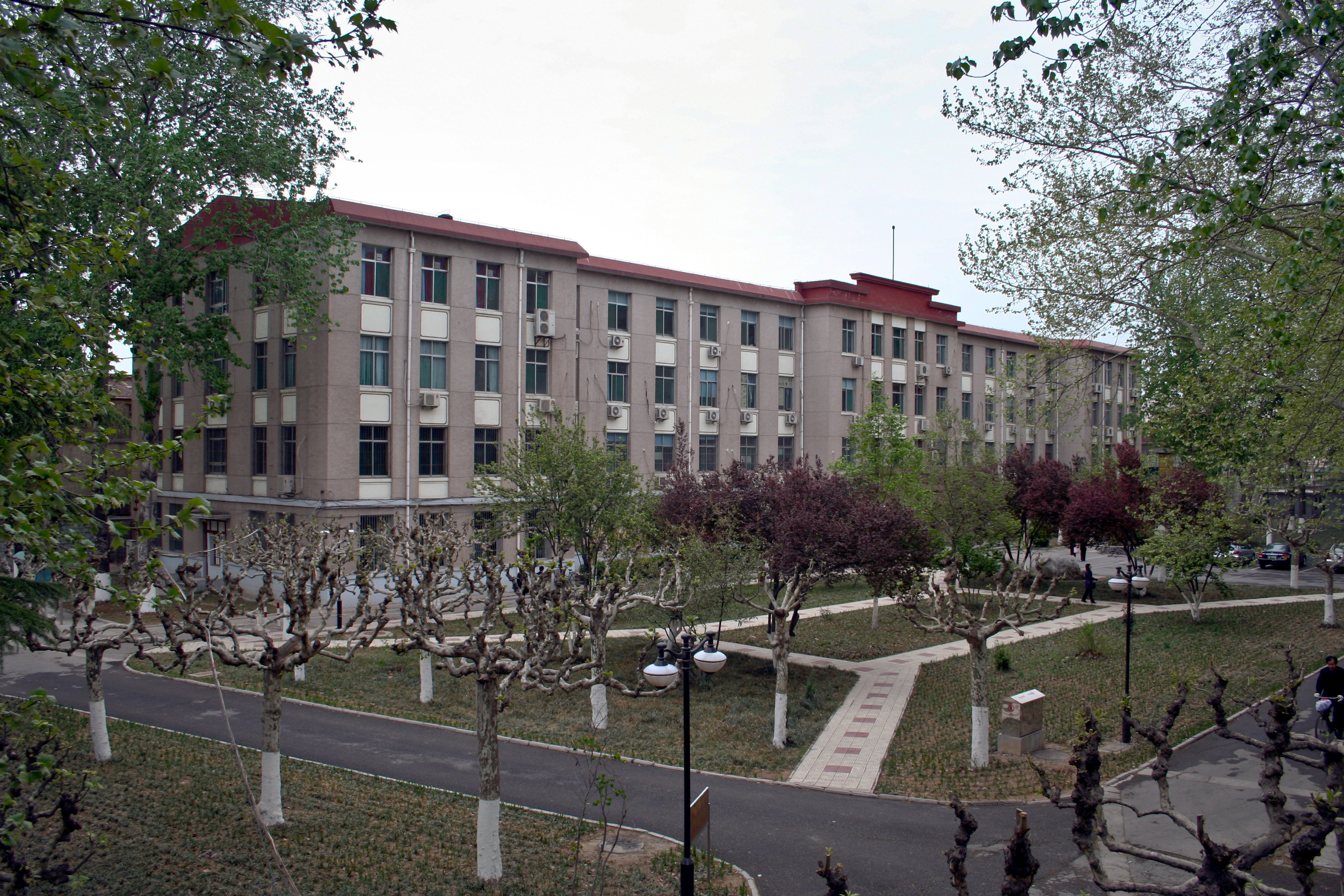
Old building of the School of Physics on the Hongjialou Campus in 2006

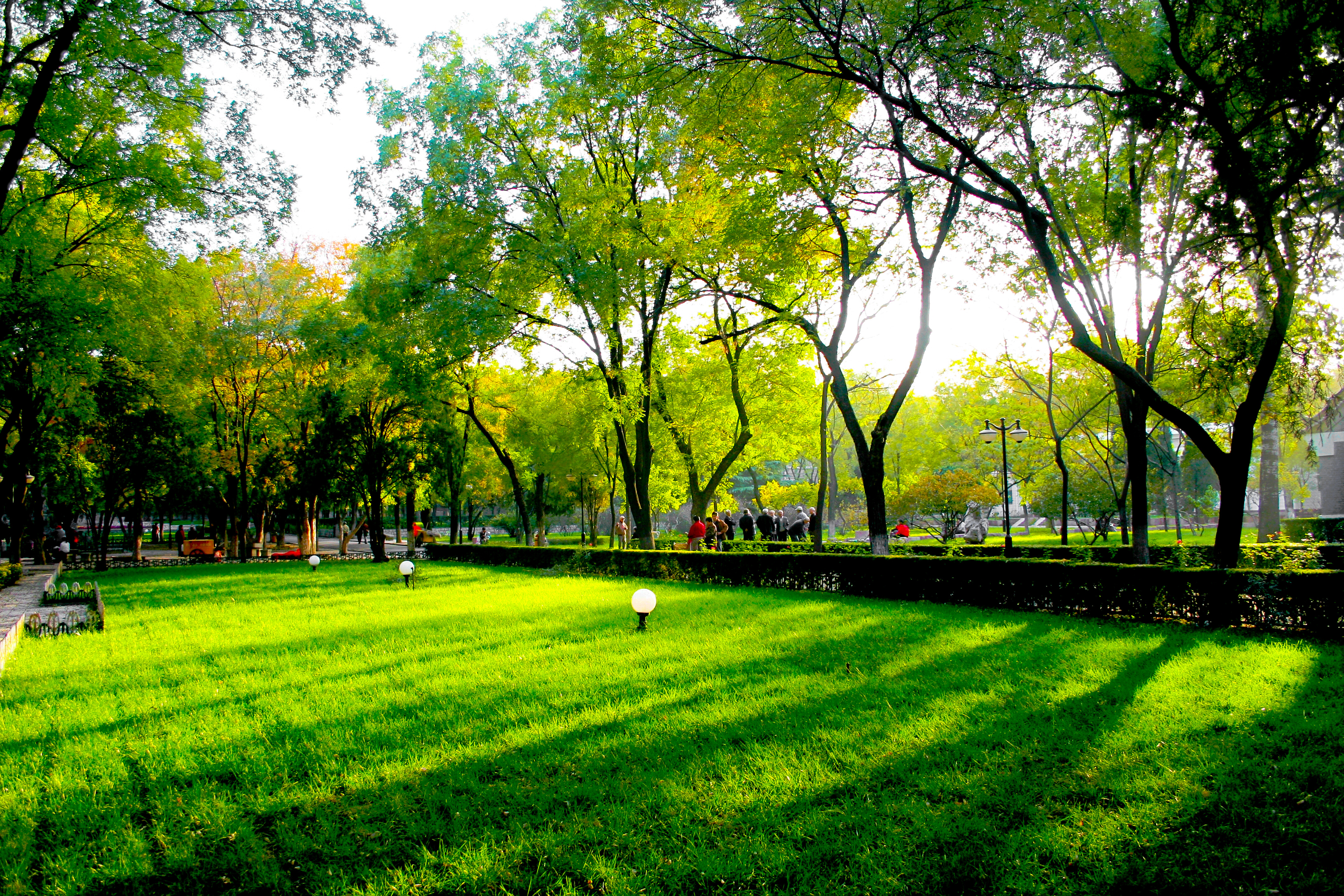
Lawn and trees on the central quadrangle of the Baotuquan Campus

- State Key Laboratory for Crystal Materials
- State Laboratory for Microbial Technology

=== National Engineering Laboratory ===
- National Engineering Laboratory for the Reduction of Coal-fired Pollutants Emission

=== National Research Center ===
- National Glycoengineering Research Center

=== Ministry of Education Key Laboratories ===
- Key Laboratory for Colloid and Interface Chemistry
- Key Laboratory for Liquid Structure and Heredity of Materials
- Key Laboratory for Experimental Teratology
- Key Laboratory for Cardiovascular Remodelling and Function Research
- Key Laboratory for Cryptologic Technology and Information Security
- Key Laboratory of Power System Intelligent Dispatch and Control

=== Ministry of Health Key Laboratories ===
- Key Laboratory for Otolaryngology

=== Key Research Base of the Ministry of Education in Humanities and Social Sciences ===
- Center for Zhouyi and Ancient Chinese Philosophy
- Center for Judaic and Inter-Religious Studies
- Institute for Literary Theory and Aesthetics
- Institute for Contemporary Socialism

=== National Research Institutes ===
- Institute for Crystal Materials
- Institute for Microbiology
- Institute for Infrared and Remote Sensing Technology

=== Research Centers of Shandong Province ===
- Geotechnical and Structural Engineering Research Center
- Laboratory for Risk Analysis and Random Calculus
- Institute for Religion, Science, and Social Studies
- Number Theory at Shandong University
- High Energy Physics Group
- Oriental Archaeology Research Center
- Center for Economic Research
- Center for Health Management & Policy
- Center for European Studies
- Center for Space Thermal Science
- Center for Japanese Studies
- Key Laboratory for Otolaryngology
- Modern Logistics Research Center
- Institute of ECIWO Biology

== University hospitals ==
=== Shandong University Qilu Hospital ===
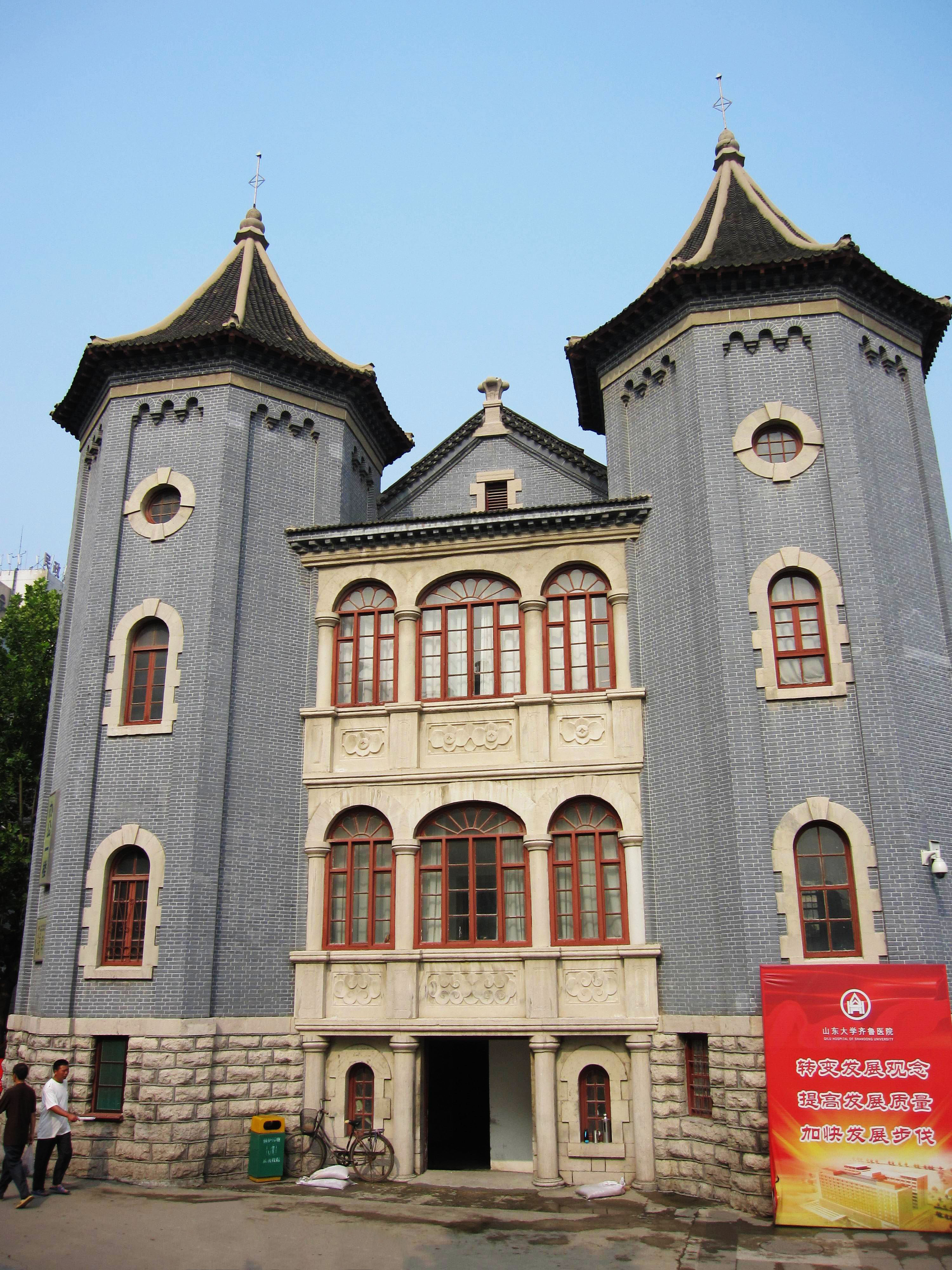
The "Republican Building" of Qilu Hospital was built in 1914 and inaugurated by military governor Jin Yunpeng.

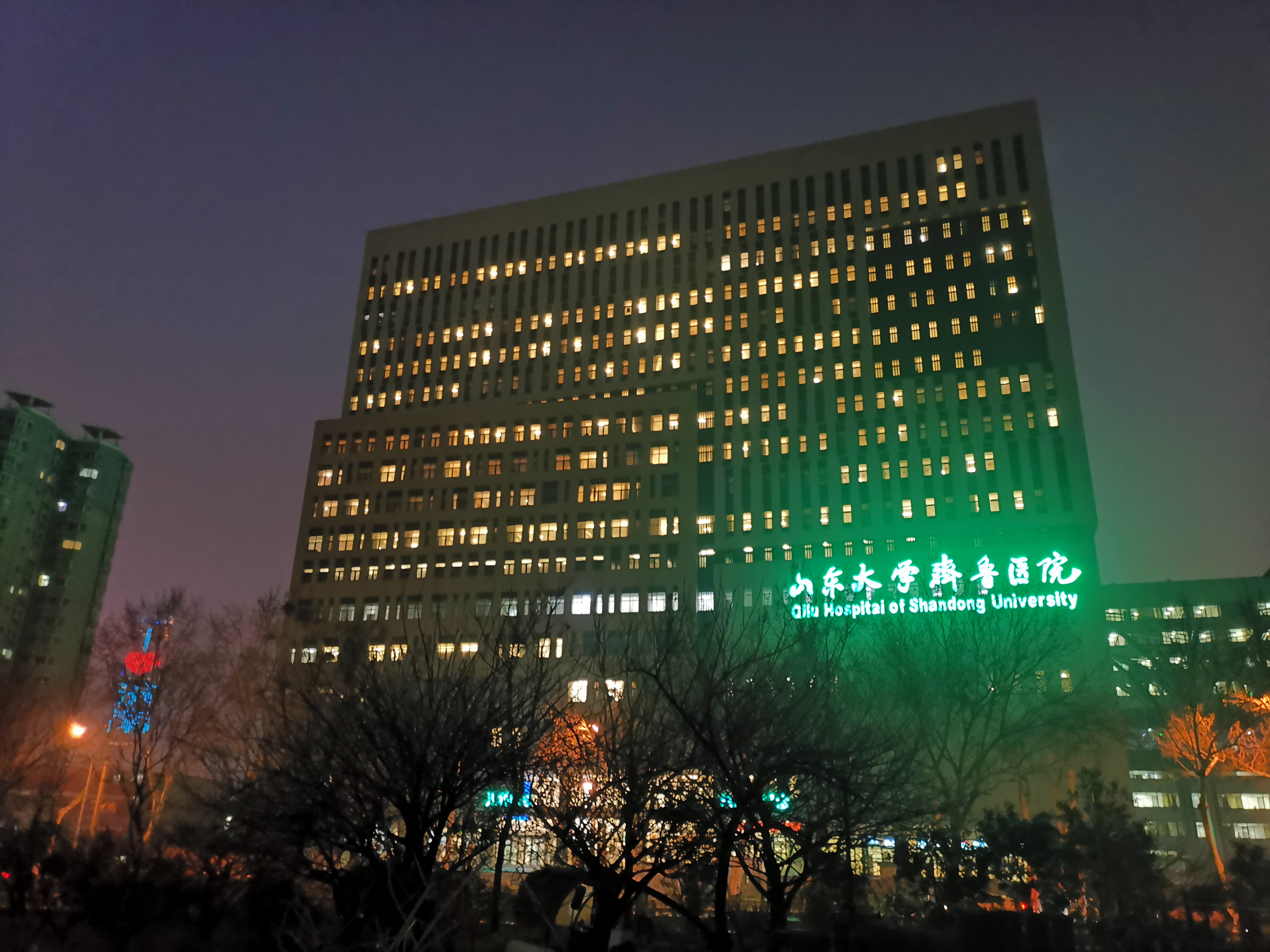
Present day Qilu Hospital inside the Baotuquan Campus

Qilu Hospital was established as the hospital of Cheeloo University. Construction started in 1914 and was supervised by Harold Balme (1878–1953), a British physician from King's College Hospital in London, who would later serve as the third president of Cheeloo University (from 1921 until 1927). The first building of the new hospital (today known as the "Republican Building") was inaugurated on September 27, 1915, by the military governor of Shandong, Jin Yunpeng. About 20 years later, the hospital moved to a new building (completed in 1936) and the old building was used by Cheeloo University's School of Medicine. Today, the Shandong University Qilu Hospital as a total capacity of 1,800 beds and treats more than 1.9 million outpatient treatments per year. It has departments include cardiology, internal medicine, hematology, gynecology and obstetrics, otolaryngology, general surgery, neurosurgery, and pediatrics. The hospital is located at Wenhua West Road 107 in Jinan.

=== Second Hospital of Shandong University ===
The Second Hospital of Shandong University has a capacity of about 2431 beds and has departments for neurosurgery, orthopedic surgery, and internal medicine. The hospital is managed by the National Medical Department and affiliated with Shandong University, it is located at Beiyuan Street 247 in Jinan.

=== Stomatology Hospital of Shandong University ===
The Stomatology Hospital of Shandong University was founded in 1977. It has 105 employees and is organized into four research centers and two laboratories. It is located at Wenhua West Road 44 in Jinan.

== Identity ==
=== Motto and slogan ===
The Origin of Letterings of Shandong University

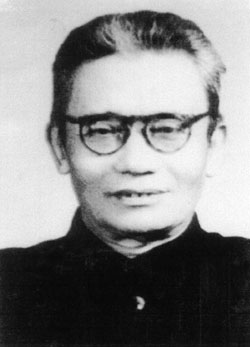
Professor Gao Heng, a philologist and palaeographer from Shandong University

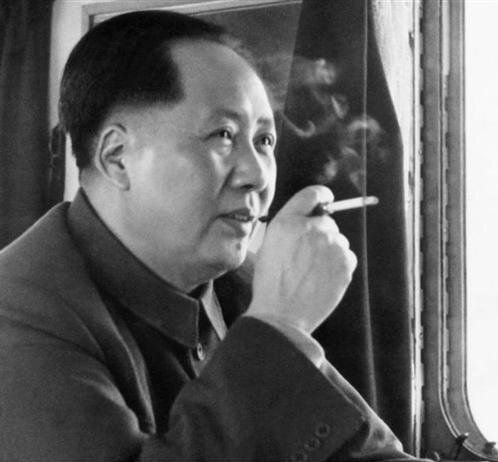
Mao Zedong corresponded with Shandong University Professor Gao Heng in the time period preceding the Cultural Revolution

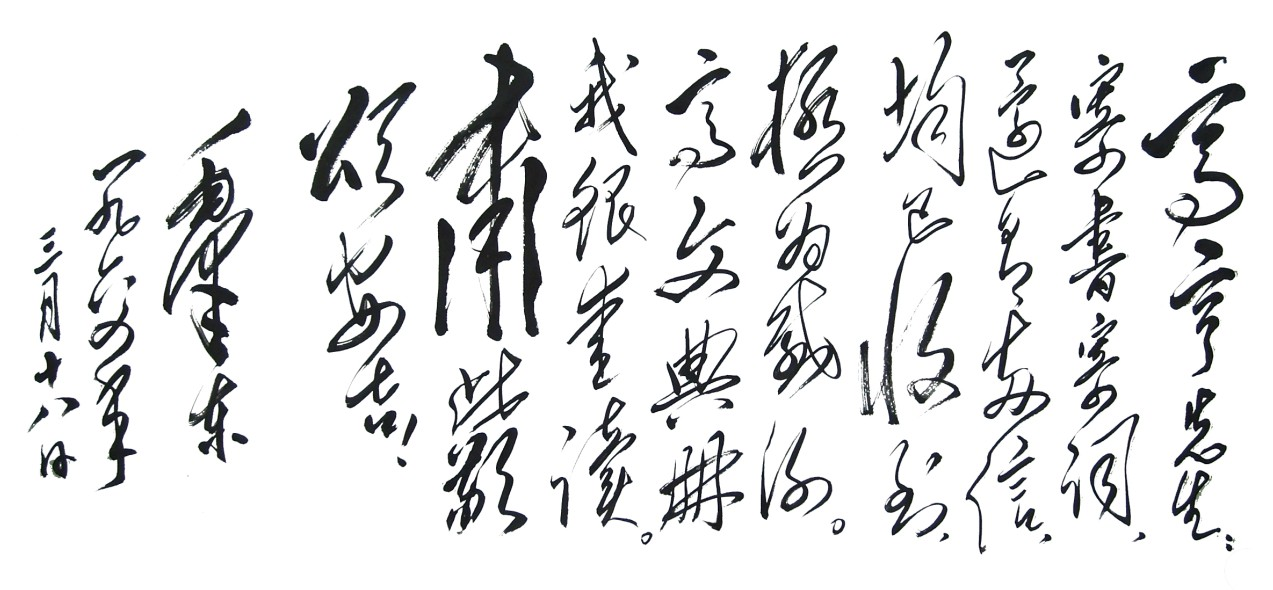
The official lettering of Shandong University has been taken from the handwritten address of this letter from Mao Zedong to Gao Heng.

The official university motto is "Noble in Spirit, Boundless in Knowledge" (simplified Chinese: 学无止境 气有浩然; traditional Chinese: 學無止境 氣有浩然; pinyin: xué wú zhǐ jìng, qì yǒu hào rán); it was adopted in May 2002. The university also uses the branding slogan "Soul of the mountains, spirit of the sea" (Chinese: 山之魂, 海之韵; pinyin: Shān zhī hún, hǎi zhī yùn) in reference to Shandong's geographical nature as a mountainous peninsula. At the main entrance gate (south gate) to the university's Central Campus, an inscription defines the mission of the university as "Preparing talents for the world; Striving for the prosperity and strength of the country" (Chinese: 为天下储人才为国家育精英; pinyin: Wèi tiān xià chǔ rén cái wèi guó jiā yù jīng yīng). The official lettering is a reproduction of calligraphy written by Mao Zedong. In March 1964, during the period between the Great Leap Forward and the Cultural Revolution, Mao wrote the characters in the address of a thank-you note to Gao Heng, a professor at Shandong University who had sent him literature.

=== Anthem ===
The official anthem of Shandong University (山东大学校歌) was written by lyricist Cheng Fangwu (成仿吾), modified by a group of people, and composer Zheng Lvcheng (郑律成). The lyrics of the official anthem are:

东临黄海，南望泰山，这里是我们追求真理的乐园。天行健，君子以自强不息； 薪火传，学子要与前贤比肩。为天下储人才，放眼五洲；为国家图富强，求索万年。志向远大，气养浩然；脚踏实地，不畏登攀。奋斗啊，奋斗啊，为了中华民族崛起；奋斗啊，奋斗啊，为了人类美好明天。 我们是崇实与求新的朝气勃发的青年！

The song of Shandong University (山东大学之歌) was written by lyricist Qiao Yu (乔羽), who also wrote the lyrics for My Motherland, and composer Gu Jianfen (谷建芬), both natives of Shandong Province. The lyrics of the anthem are:

我们向往大海,

Wǒmen xiàngwǎng dà hǎi,

只有大海能纳百川。 Zhǐyǒu dà hǎi néng nà bǎi chuān.

我们敬仰高山, Wǒmen jìngyǎng gāo shān

登高望远才知地阔天宽。 Dēnggāo wàng yuǎn cái zhī dì kuò tiān kuān.

勇于探索，不畏登攀。 Yǒngyú tànsuǒ, bù wèi dēngpān.

淡泊的襟怀，炽热的情感， Dànbó de jīnhuái, chìrè de qínggǎn,

让文明之花嫣红开遍。 Ràng wénmíng zhī huā yānhóng kāi biàn.

同学少年，青春结伴。 Tóngxué shàonián, qīngchūn jiébàn.

知识无涯，生命无限！ Zhīshì wú yá, shēngmìng wúxiàn!

=== Logo ===
The logo of SDU

The core of the pattern is based on the Chinese characters "山" (meaning Mountain, and also the abbreviation of Shandong) and "大" (meaning University) as the basic design elements. The integration of "山" and "海" is intended to imply "there is a path to the mountain of books, and diligence is the path; there is no end to the sea of knowledge, and hard work is the boat" (Chinese: 书山有路勤为径, 学海无涯苦作舟). At the same time, it is intended to suggest the university culture of "soul of the mountains, spirit of the sea" (Chinese: 山之魂, 海之韵).

== List of university presidents ==
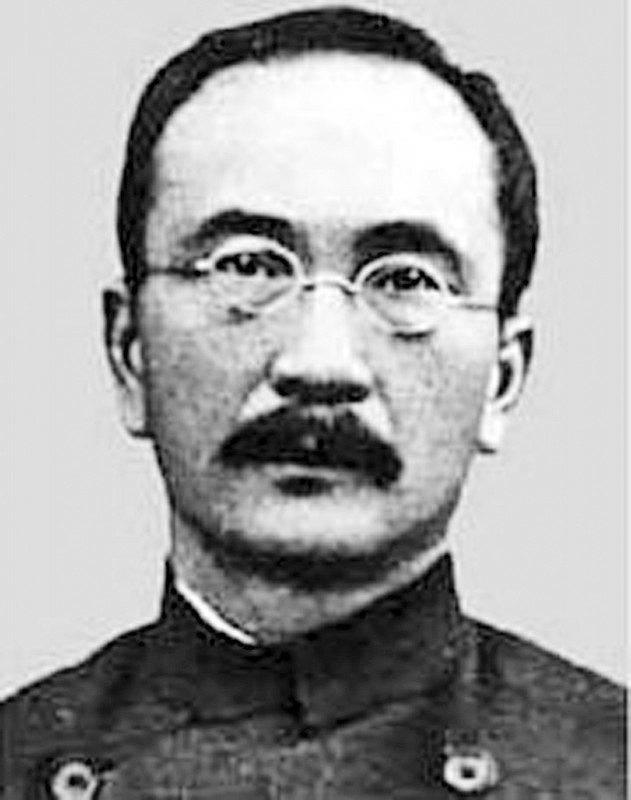
Tang Shaoyi, a graduate from Columbia University, was the first president of Shandong University (then Shandong College). He was a key figure in overthrowing the Qing Dynasty and establishing democracy in China, and later served as the first Prime Minister of the Republic of China

- Tang Shaoyi, 1901
- Zhou Xuexi, 1901, later became 2-term Finance Minister of the Republic of China
- Wang Shoupeng, president of Provincial Shandong University in Jinan, 1926–1927
- Yang Zhensheng, president of National Shandong University in Qingdao, 1930–1932
- Zhao Taimou, president of National Shandong University in Qingdao, 1932–1936 and 1946–1949
- Lin Jiqing, (acting) president of National Shandong University in Qingdao, 1936–1946
- Hua Gang, president of Shandong University (Qingdao), 1951–1955
- Chao Zhefu, president of Shandong University (Qingdao), 1956–1958
- Cheng Fangwu, president of Shandong University (Jinan), 1958–1974
- Wu Fuheng, 1979–1984
- Deng Conghao, 1984–1986
- Pan Chengdong, 1986–1997
- Zeng Fanren, 1998–2000
- Zhan Tao, 2000–2008
- Xu Xianming, 2008–2013
- Zhang Rong, 2013–2017
- Fan Liming, 2017–2022
- Li Shucai, 2022–present

== Notable faculty and alumni ==
- Lao She (1899–1966), writer, author of the novel "Rickshaw Boy" and the play "Teahouse"
- Feng Yuanjun (1900–1974), writer and scholar of Chinese classical literature and literary history
- Gao Heng (1900–1986), pioneer in the modern interpretation of the I Ching, corresponded with Mao Zedong
- Ji Xianlin (1911–2009), linguist, paleographer, historian, writer
- Jīn Xuěfēi (1956-, pen name Ha Jin), writer, publishes in English, winner of the American National Book Award (1999)
- James Veneris (1922-2004), American soldier in the Korean War who defected, English professor
- Li Congjun (1949– ), president of Xinhua News Agency (since 2008)
- Liang Shiqiu (1903–1987), writer and translator, translated the complete works of Shakespeare and George Orwell's Animal Farm into Chinese
- Lydia H. Liu, comparative literature scholar, Columbia University, 1997 Guggenheim Fellow
- Lu Kanru (1903–1978), scholar of classical Chinese literature
- Luo Ronghuan (1902–1963), Marshall of the People's Liberation Army, served as security chief during the Long March
- Ma Ruifang (1949– ), author and scholar, studied works of Pu Songling
- Mo Yan (1955– ), novelist and author of short stories, winner of Nobel Prize in Literature 2012
- Peng Shige (1947– ), mathematician contributed to stochastic analysis and mathematical finance
- Shen Congwen (1902–1988), writer combining vernacular and classical Chinese writing techniques
- Tong Dizhou (1902–1979), embryologist and vice president of the Chinese Academy of Sciences
- Wang Ganchang (1907–1998), nuclear physicist (student of Lise Meitner) and one of the principal contributors to the Chinese nuclear deterrent
- Wang Pu (1902–1969), nuclear physicist (also a student of Lise Meitner) and founder of Shandong University's School of Physics
- Wang Tongzhao (王统照, 1897–1957), novelist and poet, author of the novel "Mountain Rain" and head of Shandong University's Chinese Department
- Wang Xiaoyun (1966– ), mathematician, demonstrated collision attacks against commonly used hash functions
- Wen Yiduo (1899–1946), poet and scholar, author of poetry influenced by Western models, wrote poetry collections Hongzhu (紅燭, "Red Candle") and Sishui (死水, "Dead Water")
- Wu Aiying (1951– ), Minister of Justice of China (since 2005)
- Xiang Huaicheng (1939– ), economist and former Minister of Finance of China
- Zang Kejia (1905–2004), poet, chief editor of Poetry magazine, co-edited the "Selected Poems of Chairman Mao"
- Zhang Dongju (1982-), famous Chinese archeologist
- Zhao Xiao (1967–), economist, argued that China's economy would benefit from the spread of Christianity
- Zhou Ming-Zhen (1918–1996), paleontologist, worked on early tertiary mammals
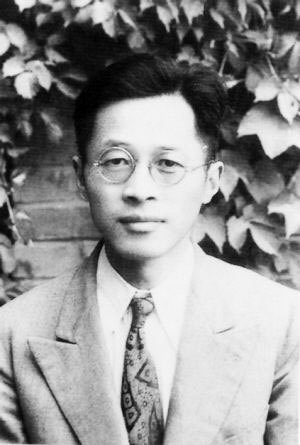
Wang Ganchang was a PhD student of Lise Meitner (co-discoverer of nuclear fission) at the Humboldt University of Berlin and became one of the fathers of China's atomic bomb

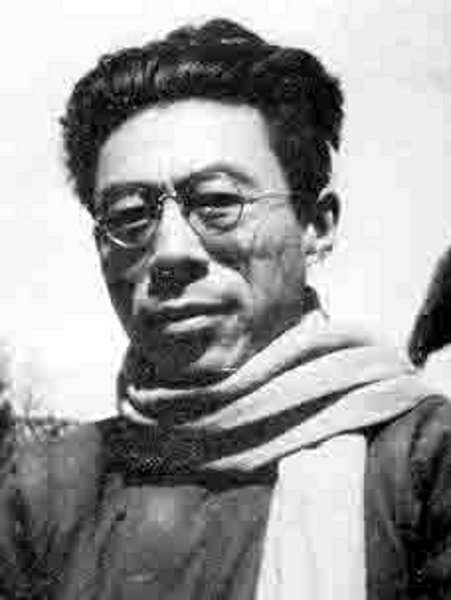
Wen Yiduo, studied at the Art Institute of Chicago, became a poet, and was assassinated by Kuomintang agents

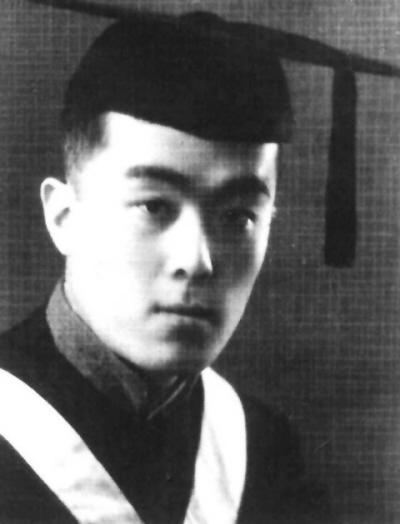
Ji Xianlin, a famous Chinese Indologist, linguist, paleographer, historian and writer who has been honored by the governments of both India and China

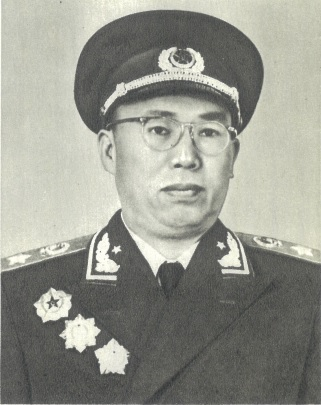
Luo Ronghuan, who served as a Vice Chair of the Standing Committee of the National People's Congress

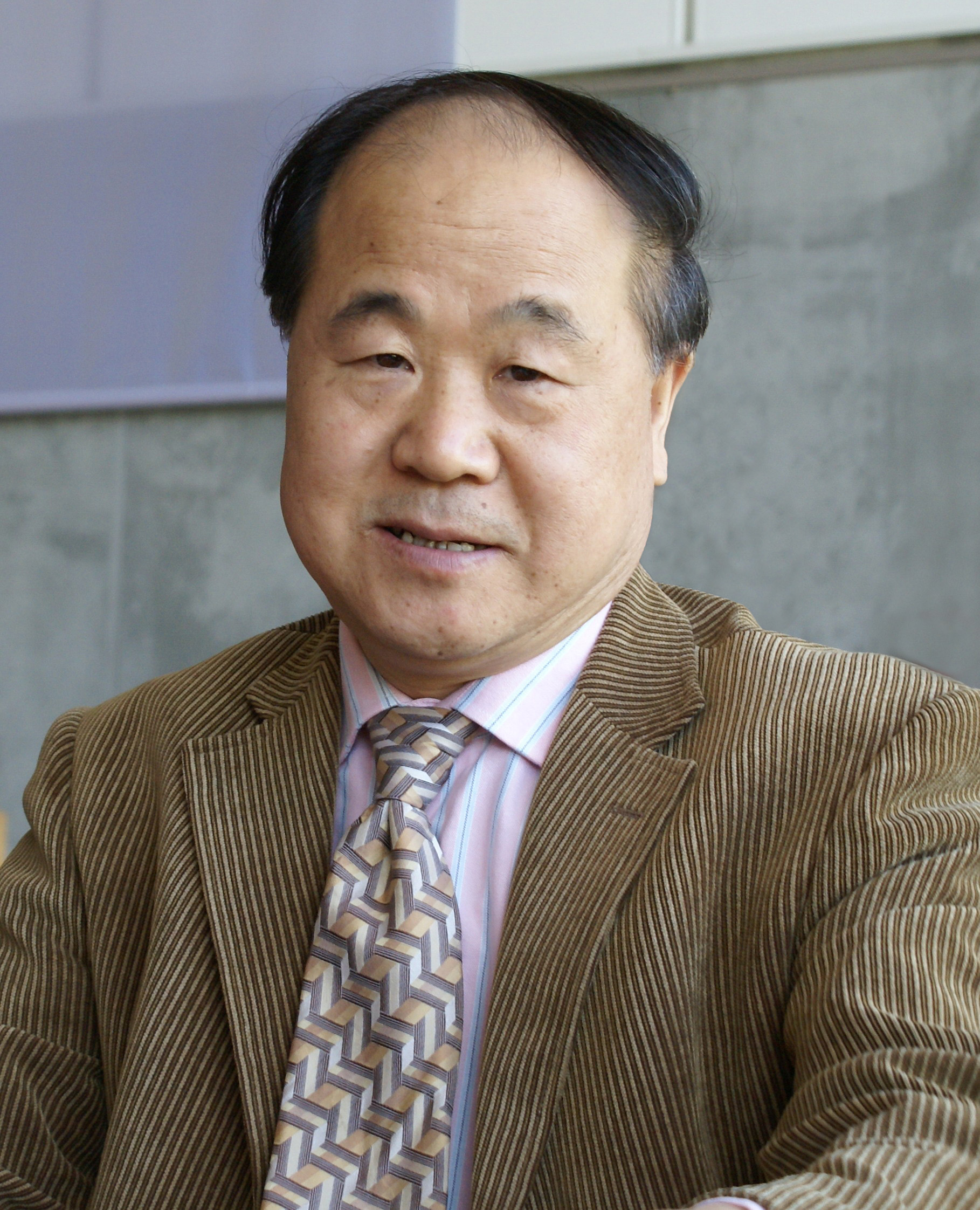
Mo Yan, who became the first Chinese laureate of Nobel Prize in Literature in 2012

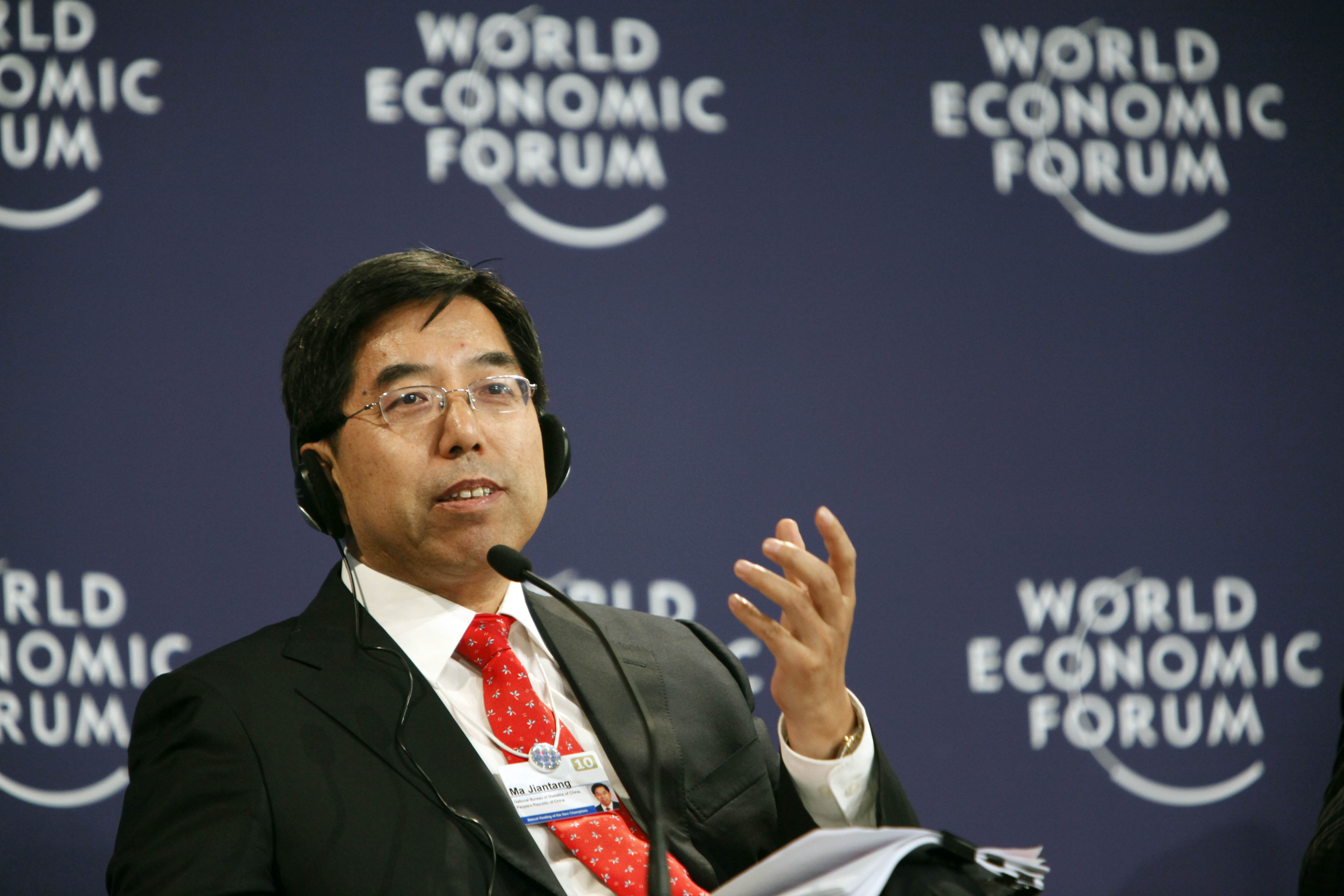
Ma Jiantang, who studied economics in Shandong University as an undergraduate, now is the party branch secretary of Development Research Center of the State Council

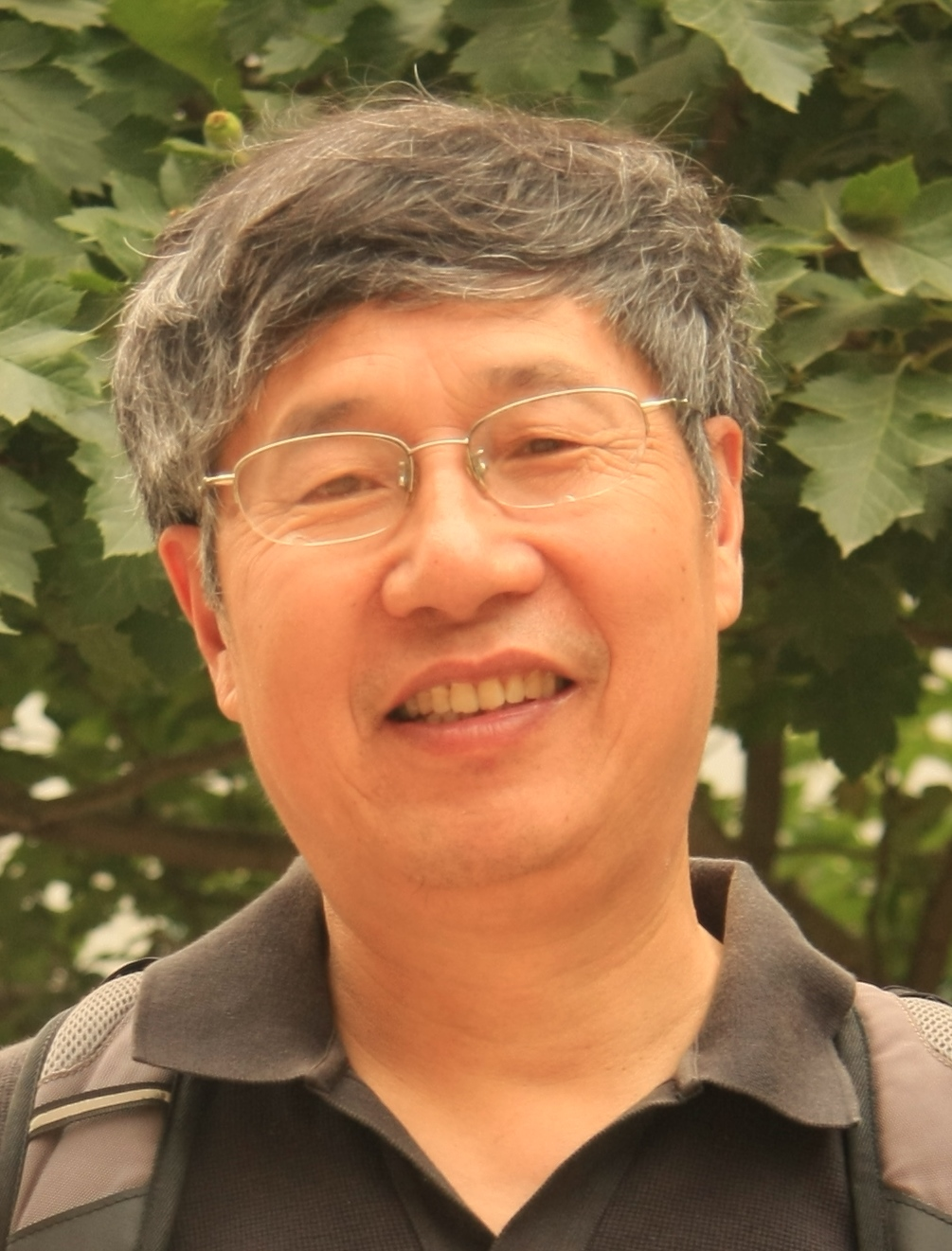
Peng Shige, member of the Chinese Academy of Sciences, a mathematician noted for his contributions in stochastic analysis and mathematical finance

== See also ==
- Cheeloo College of Medicine
- Advanced Institute for Confucian Studies, Shandong University
- Other academic institutions in Jinan (not part of Shandong University):
  - University of Jinan (Chinese: 济南大学; pinyin: Jǐnán Dàxué)
  - Shandong Normal University (Chinese: 山东师范大学; pinyin: Shāndōng Shīfàn Dàxué)
  - Shandong Jianzhu University (Chinese: 山东建筑大学; pinyin: Shāndōng Jiànzhù Dàxué)
  - Shandong University of Finance and Economics (Chinese: 山东财经大学; pinyin: Shāndōng Cáijīng Dàxué)
  - Shandong University of Traditional Chinese Medicine (Chinese: 山东中医药大学; pinyin: Shāndōng Zhōngyīyào Dàxué)
