= Zhang Wenbing =

Chinese university administrator and politician

- 张文兵

Standing Member of the Jiangsu Provincial Committee of the Chinese Communist Party
- Incumbent
- Assumed office September 2026

Standing Deputy Governor of the Jiangsu Provincial People's Government
- Incumbent
- Assumed office September 2026
- Preceded by: Ma Xin

Standing Deputy Governor of the Hubei Provincial People's Government
- In office June 2025 – September 2026
- Preceded by: Shao Xinyu

Head of the Organization Department of Hubei Provincial Committee of the Chinese Communist Party
- In office March 2022 – June 2025
- Preceded by: Li Rongcan
- Succeeded by: He Liangjun

Personal details
- Born: November 1971 (age 54) Huoqiu County, Anhui, China
- Party: Chinese Communist Party
- Education: Renmin University of China; Anhui University

Chinese name
- Simplified Chinese: 张文兵
- Traditional Chinese: 張文兵
Transcriptions
Standard Mandarin
- Hanyu Pinyin: Zhāng Wénbīng

Zhang Wenbing (Chinese: 张文兵; born November 1971) is a Chinese university administrator and politician, currently serving standing member of the Jiangsu Provincial Committee of the Chinese Communist Party and the standing deputy governor of the Jiangsu Provincial People's Government.

He is an alternate of the 20th Central Committee of the Chinese Communist Party.

== Biography ==
Zhang was born in Huoqiu County, Anhui, in November 1971. In 1990, he was accepted to the Renmin University of China, where he majored in agricultural economic management. Upon graduation, he joined the Chinese Communist Party (CCP) in June 1994. He receive his master's degree in economic in 2003 from Anhui University.

After university in 1994, Zhang worked at West Anhui United University (now West Anhui University), where he was promoted to vice president in March 2005 and to president in August 2011. He became president of Hefei University in October 2013, and served until August 2016.

Zhang began his political career in August 2016, when he was assigned to director of the Product Quality Supervision Department of the General Administration of Quality Supervision, Inspection and Quarantine, he remained in that position until January 2020, when he was reassigned as director of the Standards and Technology Management Department.

Zhang was transferred to central China's Hubei province in June 2020. He was appointed vice governor in July and four months later was admitted to member of the Standing Committee of the CCP Hubei Provincial Committee, the province's top authority. He was chosen as head of the Organization Department of CCP Hubei Provincial Committee in March 2022. In June 2025, Zhang was appointed as the standing deputy governor of the Hubei Provincial People's Government.

In September 2026, Zhang was appointed as the standing member of the Jiangsu Provincial Committee of the Chinese Communist Party. On 30 September, he was appointed as the standing deputy governor of Jiangsu.

Educational offices
| Preceded by Xia Luping | President of West Anhui University; 2011–2013 | Succeeded by Liu Xuezhong |
| Preceded by Cai Jingmin | President of Hefei University; 2013–2016 | Succeeded by Wang Qidong |
Party political offices
| Preceded by Li Rongcan | Head of the Organization Department of Hubei Provincial Committee of the Chinese Communist Party; 2022–2025 | Succeeded by He Liangjun |
Government offices
| Preceded by Shao Xinyu | Standing Deputy Governor of the Hubei Provincial People's Government; 2025–2026 | Vacant |
| Preceded by Ma Xin | Standing Deputy Governor of the Jiangsu Provincial People's Government; 2026– | Incumbent |
