= Zhou Zuyi =

Chinese politician

- 周祖翼
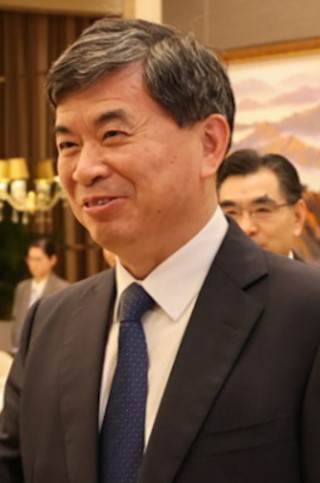
- Zhou in 2024

Party Secretary of Henan
- Incumbent
- Assumed office 23 September 2026
- Deputy: Wang Lujin; Zhang Wei
- Preceded by: Liu Ning

Party Secretary of Fujian
- In office 13 November 2022 – 23 September 2026
- Deputy: Zhao Long (Governor)
- Preceded by: Yin Li
- Succeeded by: Zhao Long

Minister of Human Resources and Social Security
- In office 24 June 2022 – 30 December 2022
- Premier: Li Keqiang
- Preceded by: Zhang Jinan
- Succeeded by: Wang Xiaoping

Personal details
- Born: January 1965 (age 61) Tiantai County, Zhejiang, China
- Party: Chinese Communist Party
- Education: Zhejiang University; Tongji University

Zhou Zuyi (Chinese: 周祖翼; pinyin: Zhōu Zǔyì; born January 1965) is a Chinese politician who is the current Party Secretary of Henan and previously served as Minister of Human Resources and Social Security and Party Secretary of Fujian. He is a member of the 20th Central Committee of the Chinese Communist Party.

He was a member of the Standing Committee of the 13th Chinese People's Political Consultative Conference and a representative of the 19th and the 20th National Congress of the Chinese Communist Party.

== Early life and education ==
Zhou was born in Tiantai County, Zhejiang, in January 1965. He attended Zhejiang University, graduating in 1984 with a Bachelor of Science. He went on to receive his Doctor of Science in 1989 at Tongji University. He was a visiting scholar at the Royal Society of the University of Wales from March 1993 to March 1994 and a visiting professor at ETH Zurich from October 1997 to October 1998.

== Career at Tongji University ==
He joined the Chinese Communist Party (CCP) in June 1984. After graduating in 1989, he stayed at Tongji University and worked successively as associate professor, associate director, researcher, and party secretary of the School of Science. He was appointed deputy party secretary of Tongji University in July 2002, concurrently serving as vice president since December 2004. He was deputy head of Organization Department of Shanghai Municipal Committee of the Chinese Communist Party in November 2008, and held that office until November 2011. In November 2011, he was promoted to become party secretary of Tongji University, a position at vice-ministerial level.

== Career in the Central Government ==
In August 2014, he entered the Organization Department of the Chinese Communist Party and was elevated to deputy head in October 2016. He was chosen as chief of the General Office of the Central Institutional Organization Commission in May 2019, a position he held until June 2022, when he promoted again to become minister of human resources and social security.

== Career in Fujian ==
On November 13, 2022, Zhou was appointed as the Party Secretary of Fujian. At the time of his appointment, he was the youngest party secretary of the Chinese Communist Party's provincial party committees, and the first party secretary to be born in or after 1965.

Party political offices
Preceded by Zhou Jialun	Party Secretary of Tongji University; 2011–2014	Succeeded by Yang Xianjin
Preceded by Chen Xiangqun	Director of the 2nd Cadre Bureau of the Organization Department of the Chinese Communist Party; 2014–2016	Succeeded by Wu Yuliang (吴玉良)
Preceded by Zhang Jinan	Chief of the General Office of the Central Institutional Organization Commission; 2019–2022	Succeeded by Li Xiaoxin
Preceded by Yin Li	Party Secretary of Fujian; 2022–2026	Succeeded by Zhao Long
Preceded by Liu Ning	Party Secretary of Henan; 2026–present	Incumbent
Government offices
Preceded by Zhang Jinan	Minister of Human Resources and Social Security; 2022	Succeeded by Wang Xiaoping
