= Office of the Central Institutional Organization Commission =

Chinese Communist Party body

- 中央机构编制委员会办公室
- Emblem of the Chinese Communist Party

Agency overview
- Type: Administrative agency of the Central Institutional Organization Commission
- Jurisdiction: Chinese Communist Party
- Headquarters: Beijing
- Agency executive: Li Xiaoxin, Director
- Parent agency: Central Integrated Military and Civilian Development Commission

Office of the Central Institutional Organization Commission
- Simplified Chinese: 中央机构编制委员会办公室
- Traditional Chinese: 中央機構編制委員會辦公室
Transcriptions
Standard Mandarin
- Hanyu Pinyin: Zhōngyāng Jīgòu Biānzhì Wěiyuánhuì Bàngōngshì

Abbreviation
- Simplified Chinese: 中央编办
- Traditional Chinese: 中央編辦
Transcriptions
Standard Mandarin
- Hanyu Pinyin: Zhōngyāng Biānbàn

The Office of the Central Institutional Organization Commission is the administrative agency of the Central Institutional Organization Commission, a policy formulation body of the Central Committee of the Chinese Communist Party (CCP).

The Office is the permanent body of the commission, and handles its day-to-day administrative operations. It is under the leadership of the Central Institutional Organization Commission, and is responsible for the daily management of the national administrative system and institutional reform as well as the establishment of institutions. The Office of the Central Institutional Organization Commission is both an agency of the CCP Central Committee and of the State Council.

== History ==
In September 1950, the State Council and its subordinate units' organization establishment review committee was transferred to the Ministry of Personnel, and the separate State Council establishment committee was no longer retained. In December 1951, the State Council decided to transfer the local organization establishment management responsibilities of the Ministry of Finance to the Ministry of Personnel, and the State Council and its subordinate units' organization establishment review committee and the national establishment committee were unified and transferred to the establishment section of the second bureau of the Ministry of Personnel and other institutions to undertake specific work.

In 1991, with the approval of the Central Committee, it was decided to establish the Central Institutional Organization Commission as the deliberative and coordinating body of the CCP Central Committee. The Office of the Central Institutional Organization Commission is responsible for the unified leadership and management of the work of the Party and state organization and is included in the sequence of institutions directly under the CCP Central Committee. The Central Institutional Organization Commission has 10 internal departments, namely: General Affairs Department, Policy and Regulations Department, Administrative Management System Reform Department, Public Institution Reform Department, Department One, Department Two, Department Three, Department Four, Supervision and Inspection Department, and Party Committee of the Organ (Personnel Department).

In June 2013, with the approval of the State Council, the leading unit for the reform of the administrative approval system of the State Council was adjusted from the Ministry of Supervision to the Central Organization Department, and the Office of the Leading Group for the Reform of the Administrative Approval System of the State Council was established in the Central Organization Department.

In March 2018, according to the “Plan for Deepening the Reform of Party and State Institutions” issued by the CCP Central Committee, the CCP Central Organization Department unified the management of the Office of the Central Institutional Organization Commission. After the reform, the Central Institutional Organization Commission has 10 internal departments, namely: General Affairs Bureau, Policy and Regulations Bureau, Administrative Management System Reform Bureau, Public Institution Reform Bureau, First Bureau, Second Bureau, Third Bureau, Fourth Bureau, Supervision and Inspection Bureau, and Party Committee of the Organ (Personnel Bureau).

== Organizational structure ==
The Office of the Central Institutional Organization Commission has the following institutions:

=== Internal Organization ===
- General Bureau
- Policy and Regulation Bureau
- Institutional Reform Bureau
- First Bureau
- Second Bureau
- Third Bureau
- Fourth Bureau
- Public Institutions Registration and Administration Bureau (National Public Institutions Registration and Administration Bureau)
- Supervision and Inspection Bureau
- Party Committee of the Organization (Personnel Bureau)

=== Directly affiliated institutions ===
- Institutional Establishment Research Center (China Administrative System and Institutional Reform Research Center)
- Organization Data Center
- Domain Name Registration Service Center for Government Affairs and Public Welfare Institutions
- Office Service Center (Office Service Bureau)

=== Responsible social groups ===
- China Organization and Staffing Management Research Association
