= Central Integrated Military and Civilian Development Commission =

Chinese Communist Party body

- 中央军民融合发展委员会
- Emblem of the Chinese Communist Party

Agency overview
- Formed: February 2014
- Preceding agency: Central Leading Group for Cybersecurity and Informatization
- Type: Policy coordination and consultation body
- Jurisdiction: Chinese Communist Party
- Headquarters: Beijing
- Agency executives: Xi Jinping, Director; Li Qiang, Deputy Director; Wang Huning, Deputy Director
- Parent agency: Central Committee of the Chinese Communist Party
- Child agency: Office

Central Integrated Military and Civilian Development Commission
- Simplified Chinese: 中央军民融合发展委员会
- Traditional Chinese: 中央軍民融合發展委員會
Transcriptions
Standard Mandarin
- Hanyu Pinyin: Zhōngyāng Jūnmín Rónghé Fāzhǎn Wěiyuánhuì

The Central Integrated Military and Civilian Development Commission is the decision-making and coordinating body of the Central Committee of the Chinese Communist Party on major issues related to military–civil fusion.

== History ==
By 2015, China had established many deliberative and coordinating bodies for military–civil fusion, such as the Inter-ministerial Coordination Group for the Construction of a Military–Civilian Integration and Military–Civilian Weapon Equipment Research and Production System (军民结合、寓军于民武器装备科研生产体系建设部际协调小组), the State Council and Central Military Commission Leading Group for the Socialization of Military Support (国务院、中央军委军队保障社会化工作领导小组), the Leading Group for the Training of Military Cadres Based on General Higher Education (依托普通高等教育培养军队干部工作领导小组), and the National Defense Mobilization Commission.

The "Proposal of the CCP Central Committee on Formulating the Thirteenth Five-Year Plan for National Economic and Social Development" adopted at the 5th Plenary Session of the 18th Central Committee of the Chinese Communist Party on 29 October 2015 clearly requires the improvement of the "Three Systems" (organizational management system, work operation system, and policy and institutional system) of military–civil fusion development. The organizational management system refers to the establishment of military–civil fusion development leadership bodies at the national and provincial (autonomous region, municipality) levels to unify the leadership of military–civil fusion development work.

On 22 January 2017, Xi Jinping created a Central Military–Civil Fusion Development Committee (CMCFDC), which is responsible for the planning and implementation of the MCF in China.

== 2017 Committee members ==
The original members of the Committee at the time of its establishment in January 2017, which may be seen as representative of the average committee composition (which is usually not revealed), were as follows:

Leader

- Xi Jinping (General Secretary of the CCP)

Deputy Leaders

- Li Keqiang (Politburo member, Premier of the State Council)
- Liu Yunshan (Politburo member, Secretary of the Central Party Secretariat)
- Zhang Gaoli (Politburo member, Vice-Premier of the State Council)

Members

- Ma Kai (Politburo member, Vice-Premier of the State Council)
- Wang Huning (Politburo member, director of the Central Policy Research Office)
- Xu Qiliang (Politburo member, Vice-chairman of the Central Military Commission)
- Fan Changlong (Politburo member, vice-chairman of the Central Military Commission)
- Meng Jianzhu (Politburo member, Secretary of the Central Political and Legal Affairs Commission)
- Li Zhanshu (Politburo member, head of the General Office of the Chinese Communist Party)
- Yang Jing (Secretary of the Party Secretariat, State Councilor, and Secretary General of the State Council)
- Guo Shengkun (State Councilor and Minister of Public Security)
- Zhang Yang (Member of the CMC, director of the Political Work Department)
- Zhao Kexi (Member of the CMC, director of the Logistics Support Department)
- Zhang Youxia (Member of the CMC, director of the Equipment Development Department)
- Chen Xi (Deputy head of the Organization Department)
- Huang Kunming (deputy director of the Central Propaganda Department)
- Xu Lin (Director of the Office of the Central Cyberspace Leading Group)
- Zhang Yesui (Party Secretary of the Ministry of Foreign Affairs)
- He Lifeng (Director of the National Development and Reform Commission)
- Chen Baosheng (Minister of Education)
- Wang Zhigang (Party secretary of the Ministry of Science and Technology)
- Miao Wei (Minister of Industry and Information Technology)
- Huang Shuxian (Minister of Civil Affairs)
- Xiao Jie (Minister of Finance)
- Yin Yumin (Minister of Human Resources and Social Security)
- Li Xiaopeng (Minister of Transport)

== Leadership ==
=== Directors ===
Portrait	Name	Tenure begins	Tenure ends	Note
	Xi Jinping	22 January 2017		

=== Deputy Directors ===
Portrait	Name	Tenure begins	Tenure ends	Note
	Li Keqiang	22 January 2017	March 2023	
	Liu Yunshan	22 January 2017	25 October 2017	
	Zhang Gaoli	22 January 2017	25 October 2017	
	Li Qiang	March 2023		
	Wang Huning	25 October 2017		
	Han Zheng	25 October 2017		

== Office ==
=== Directors of the Office ===
Name	Tenure begins	Tenure ends	Note
Zhang Gaoli	22 January 2017	25 October 2017	
Han Zheng	25 October 2017		

== Commission members ==
=== Deputy Directors of the Office ===
Name	Tenure begins	Tenure ends	Note
Jin Zhuanglong	2017	July 2022	
Sun Shaocheng	25 October 2017	April 2022	
Wang Shunian	25 October 2017		
Pei Jinjia	April 2022		
