= List of universities and colleges in Anhui =

The following is list of universities and colleges in Anhui.

== List ==
| Name | Chinese name | Type | Location |
|---|---|---|---|
| Hefei University of Technology | 合肥工业大学 | National (Direct) | Hefei |
| University of Science and Technology of China | 中国科学技术大学 | National (Other) | Hefei |
| Anhui Agricultural University | 安徽农业大学 | Provincial | Hefei |
| Anhui Jianzhu University | 安徽建筑大学 | Provincial | Hefei |
| Anhui Medical University | 安徽医科大学 | Provincial | Hefei |
| Anhui Normal University | 安徽师范大学 | Provincial | Wuhu |
| Anhui Polytechnic University | 安徽工程大学 | Provincial | Wuhu |
| Anhui University | 安徽大学 | Provincial | Hefei |
| Anhui University of Chinese Medicine | 安徽中医药大学 | Provincial | Hefei |
| Anhui University of Finance and Economics | 安徽财经大学 | Provincial | Bengbu |
| Anhui University of Science and Technology | 安徽理工大学 | Provincial | Huainan |
| Anhui University of Technology | 安徽工业大学 | Provincial | Maanshan |
| Anqing Normal University | 安庆师范大学 | Provincial | Anqing |
| Bengbu Medical College | 蚌埠医学院 | Provincial | Bengbu |
| Chaohu University | 巢湖学院 | Provincial | Hefei |
| Fuyang Normal University | 阜阳师范学院 | Provincial | Fuyang |
| Hefei Normal University | 合肥师范学院 | Provincial | Hefei |
| Hefei University | 合肥学院 | Provincial | Hefei |
| Huaibei Normal University | 淮北师范大学 | Provincial | Huaibei |
| Huainan United University | 淮南联合大学学 | Provincial | Huainan |
| Huangshan University | 黄山学院 | Provincial | Huangshan |
| Wannan Medical College | 皖南医学院 | Provincial | Wuhu |
| West Anhui University | 皖西学院 | Provincial | Lu'an |
| Anhui Science and Technology University | 安徽科技学院 | Provincial | Chuzhou |
| Bengbu University | 蚌埠学院 | Provincial | Bengbu |
| Chizhou University | 池州学院 | Provincial | Chizhou |
| Chuzhou University | 滁州学院 | Provincial | Chuzhou |
| Huainan Normal University | 淮南师范学院 | Provincial | Huainan |
| Suzhou University | 宿州学院 | Provincial | Suzhou |
| Tongling University | 铜陵学院 | Provincial | Tongling |
