= Zhang Jinan =

Chinese politician

- 张纪南

Minister of Human Resources and Social Security
- In office March 2018 – June 2022
- Premier: Li Keqiang
- Preceded by: Yin Weimin
- Succeeded by: Zhou Zuyi

Personal details
- Born: February 1957 (age 69) Jiexi County, Guangdong, China
- Party: Chinese Communist Party
- Education: Wuhan University of Technology; Nankai University

Chinese name
- Simplified Chinese: 张纪南
- Traditional Chinese: 張紀南
Transcriptions
Standard Mandarin
- Hanyu Pinyin: Zhāng Jìnán
Hakka
- Romanization: Zong^{1} Gi^{3}-nam^{2}
Yue: Cantonese
- Jyutping: Zoeng^{1} Gei^{2}-naam^{4}
Southern Min
- Teochew Peng'im: Dion^{1} Gi^{2}-nam^{5}

Zhang Jinan (Chinese: 张纪南; born February 1957) is a Chinese politician who served as chief of the General Office of the Central Institutional Organization Commission of the Chinese Communist Party (CCP), and the Minister of Human Resources and Social Security.

Zhang was a member of the 18th Central Commission for Discipline Inspection.

== Early life and education ==
Zhang is a native of Jiexi County, Guangdong, and a member of the CCP. He graduated from the Wuhan College of Marine Transportation Engineering (now Wuhan University of Technology) with a degree in machinery manufacturing, and then received a doctorate in enterprise management from Nankai University.

== Career ==
Zhang has served as deputy secretary of the Tianjin Communist Youth League committee, general manager of the Hainan China Travel Service, deputy director of the Hainan Provincial CCP Committee Organization Department, and secretary of the Hainan Provincial Enterprise and Industry Committee. In April 2002, he was named to the Hainan provincial Party Standing Committee, and in May of that year began serving concurrently as the head of the provincial organization department. In January 2004, he was transferred to serve as director of the organization department of the Henan Provincial Party Committee.

In June 2004, Zhang moved to the central government, being appointed a member of the Departmental Affairs Committee of the Organization Department of the Chinese Communist Party, as well as head of the department's Second Cadre Bureau (Local Cadre Bureau). In March 2007, he was promoted to deputy director of the department. In April 2013, he was appointed to his current position of chief of the General Office of the Central Institutional Organization Commission (minister-level).

In March 2018, Zhang was appointed as the Minister of Human Resources and Social Security.

Party political offices
Preceded by Wang Yongqing	Chief of the General Office of the Central Institutional Organization Commission; 2013 – 2019	Succeeded by Zhou Zuyi
Government offices
Preceded by Yin Weimin	Minister of Human Resources and Social Security; 2018 – 2022	Succeeded by Zhou Zuyi
