= Li Yuanyuan =

Li Yuanyuan, may refer to:

- Li Yuanyuan (actress), winner of a 1990 Golden Eagle Award
- Li Yuanyuan (engineer) (born 1958), Chinese engineer and academician of the Chinese Academy of Engineering
- Li Yuanyuan (swimmer) (born 1976), Chinese synchronized swimmer

== See also ==
- Liu Yuanyuan, (born 1982), Chinese biathlete and cross-country skier
