= Minister of Human Resources and Social Security =

Minister of the People's Republic of China

Minister of Human Resources and Social Security of the People's Republic of China
- 中华人民共和国人力资源和社会保障部部长
- National Emblem of China

- Flag of China

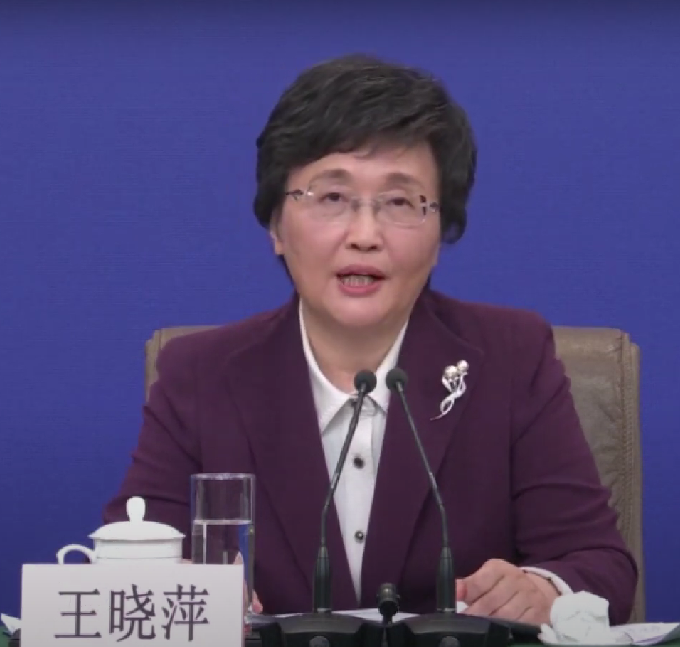
- Incumbent; Wang Xiaoping since 30 December 2022
- Ministry of Human Resources and Social Security
- Status: Provincial and ministerial-level official
- Member of: Plenary Meeting of the State Council
- Seat: Ministry of Human Resources and Social Security Building, Dongcheng District, Beijing
- Nominator: Premier (chosen within the Chinese Communist Party)
- Appointer: President; with the confirmation of the National People's Congress or its Standing Committee
- Formation: March 2008; 18 years ago
- First holder: Yin Weimin
- Deputy: Vice Minister of Human Resources and Social Security

The Minister of Human Resources and Social Security of the People's Republic of China is the head of the Ministry of Human Resources and Social Security of the People's Republic of China and a member of the State Council. Within the State Council, the position is thirteenth in order of precedence. The minister is responsible for leading the ministry, presiding over its meetings, and signing important documents related to the ministry. Officially, the minister is nominated by the premier of the State Council, who is then approved by the National People's Congress or its Standing Committee and appointed by the president.

The current minister is Wang Xiaoping, who concurrently serves as the Chinese Communist Party Committee Secretary of the ministry.

== List of ministers ==
=== (Human Resources) original Ministry of Personnel ===
No.	Name	Took office	Left office	Ref.
Minister of Personnel
1	An Ziwen	October 1949	November 1954	
Post abolished
2	Zhao Dongwan	April 1988	March 1993	
3	Song Defu	March 1993	December 2000	
4	Zhang Xuezhong	December 2000	December 2002	
5	Zhang Bolin (张柏林)	December 2002	August 2007	
6	Yin Weimin	August 2007	March 2008	

=== (Social Security) original Ministry of Labor ===
No.	Name	Took office	Left office	Ref.
Minister of Labor
1	Li Lisan	October 1949	September 1954	
2	Ma Wenrui	September 1954	1966	
Post abolished
3	Luo Gan	April 1988	December 1988	
4	Ruan Chongwu	December 1988	1989	
5	Li Boyong	1989	March 1993	
Minister of Labor and Social Security
6	Zhang Zuoji	March 1998	March 2003	
7	Zheng Silin	March 2003	July 2005	
8	Tian Chengping	July 2005	March 2008	

=== Human Resources and Social Security (Personnel and Labor) ===
No.	Name	Took office	Left office	Ref.
Minister of Labor and Personnel
1	Zhao Shouyi	1982	1985	
2	Zhao Dongwan	1985	April 1988	
Minister of Human Resources and Social Security
3	Yin Weimin	March 2008	March 2018	
4	Zhang Jinan	March 2018	June 2022	
5	Zhou Zuyi	June 2022	December 2022	
6	Wang Xiaoping	December 2022	Incumbent	
