= Ding Lieyun =

Chinese management scientist and educator

- 丁烈云

President of Huazhong University of Science and Technology
- In office March 2014 – October 2018
- Preceded by: Li Peigen
- Succeeded by: Li Yuanyuan

President of Northeastern University
- In office January 2011 – March 2014
- Preceded by: He Jicheng
- Succeeded by: Zhao Ji

Communist Party Secretary of Central China Normal University
- In office June 2003 – January 2011
- Preceded by: Ma Min
- Succeeded by: Yang Zongkai

Personal details
- Born: 22 November 1955 (age 70) Honghu, Hubei, China
- Party: Chinese Communist Party
- Education: Wuhan Colledge Of Building Meterials Industry; Wuhan Polytechnic University; Tongji University
- Scientific career
- Fields: Industrial management engineering
- Institutions: Central China Normal University; Northeastern University; Huazhong University of Science and Technology

Chinese name
- Simplified Chinese: 丁烈云
- Traditional Chinese: 丁烈雲
Transcriptions
Standard Mandarin
- Hanyu Pinyin: Dīng Lièyún

Ding Lieyun (Chinese: 丁烈云; born 22 November 1955) is a Chinese management scientist and educator. He served as the president of Northeastern University and is the current president of Huazhong University of Science and Technology. He was elected a member of Chinese Academy of Engineering in 2015.

== Life and career ==
Ding was born on 22 November 1955 in Honghu, Hubei. He completed his undergraduate study in Wuhan College of Building Materials Industry in 1982, and received his master of industrial management engineering from Wuhan Polytechnic University in 1987. In 2002, he got his doctor of industrial management engineering from Tongji University.

He served as the vice-president of Wuhan Institute of Urban Construction from 1994 to 1999, and the president from 1999 to 2000. After he received his doctor's degree, he served as the vice-president of Huazhong University of Science and Technology and the director of the university's National Laboratory of Defense Technology from 2000 to 2003. Then he served as the Chinese Communist Party Committee Secretary of Central China Normal University from 2003 to 2011, the president of Northeastern University from 2011 to 2014, and the president of HUST from 2014.

== Research ==
Ding led the design of digital management systems of urban rail transit construction project in China. He proposed 3 kinds of system architecture based on Computer Integrated Construction. This system was used in the construction of Shenyang Metro. Ding and his colleagues also developed a computer system to automatically identificate and pre-warn the security risks in rail transit construction.

Party political offices
Preceded by Ma Min	Communist Party Secretary of Central China Normal University; 2003–2011	Succeeded by Yang Zongkai
Educational offices
Preceded by He Jicheng	President of Northeastern University; 2011–2014	Succeeded by Zhao Ji
Preceded by Li Peigen	President of Huazhong University of Science and Technology; 2014–2018	Succeeded by Li Yuanyuan
