= Chen Xuefeng =

Chinese politician and executive

- 陈雪枫

Communist Party Secretary of Luoyang
- In office July 2013 – January 2016
- Preceded by: Mao Wanchun
- Succeeded by: Li Ya

Vice Governor of Henan
- In office January 2011 – July 2013
- Governor: Guo Gengmao

Personal details
- Born: September 1958 (age 67–68) Kaifeng, Henan, China
- Party: Chinese Communist Party (1985–2016; expelled)
- Education: China University of Mining and Technology

Chen Xuefeng (simplified Chinese: 陈雪枫; traditional Chinese: 陳雪楓; pinyin: Chén Xuěfēng; born September 1958) is a former Chinese politician and mining executive from Henan province. He was investigated by the Central Commission for Discipline Inspection in January 2016 and expelled from the Chinese Communist Party (CCP) a few months later. He served as CCP Committee Secretary of Luoyang, the top political position in the city, from July 2013 to January 2016. He was a member of the Henan Provincial Party Standing Committee.

== Early career ==
Chen was born in a rural village in Qi County, Kaifeng, Henan, in September 1958. His mother died when he was just two years old; he was raised by his father and often foraged for food from his neighbours. His family was so poor that they did not have the money to cover the expenses of burial for his deceased mother. Chen's father served in the army for famed general Peng Xuefeng, a famed pre-revolution general of Mao's Red Army. Chen's father named him after General Peng. Chen had outstanding grades in school, eventually earning himself admission to the China University of Mining and Technology shortly after the end of the Cultural Revolution in 1976. He majored in coal processing.

Chen began working in October 1975, and joined the Chinese Communist Party (CCP) in November 1985. In 1982, shortly after graduating, Chen was selected to work in the mines of Yima, Henan. There he rose steadily up its ranks, eventually overseeing the mine's operations. The Yima Coal Bureau was re-organized into the Yimei Group (义煤集团), and Chen served as one of its executives.

From July 2000 to November 2008, he was general manager, president, and CCP Committee Secretary of Yongcheng Coal and Electric Power Group Corp (永城煤电). Then he served as president and party chief of Henan Coal Chemical Industry Group Co., Ltd (河南煤业化工集团), and held that office until January 2011. In January 2011 he was promoted to become vice-governor of Henan, he remained in that position until July 2013, when he was transferred to Luoyang and appointed the CCP Committee Secretary.

== Luoyang ==
In Luoyang, Chen spearheaded massive projects, many of which were abandoned. Luoyang's Luopu Park was thoroughly revamped but the project was never completed. These projects earned Chen the nickname Chen Yiban (literally, "Chen one half") among locals. However, Chen also contributed to Luoyang's economic development, bringing the city from a laggard in economic growth statistics in the province back to a 9% growth rate by the time he was removed from office.

He was a member of the 11th National People's Congress.

== Downfall ==
In 2014, his subordinate, then Luoyang vice-mayor Guo Yipin was captured by police after going into hiding as a result of a corruption investigation. Chen was also the subject of reports of misconduct submitted to the authorities, and rumors of his downfall began circulating as early as 2014. On January 15, 2016, Chen was taking part in an economic conference when he was surrounded by investigative personnel and taken away for investigation. The events took place so suddenly that much of the conference's agenda had to be changed following Chen being taken into custody. The investigation was announced by the Central Commission for Discipline Inspection on January 16, as Chen emerged as the first "tiger" of 2016 in the anti-corruption campaign in China which began after the CCP's 18th National Congress. He was expelled from the CCP on June 2, 2016, for violated Eight-point Regulation, membership in private clubs, falsifying age and bribery. Chen was sentenced to life in prison for taking bribes worth 125 million yuan, plundering the public fund worth 5.47 million yuan and abusing of power on May 31, 2017.

Party political offices
| Preceded by Mao Wanchun | Communist Party Secretary of Luoyang; 2013–2016 | Succeeded by Li Ya |
