= Zhan Tao =

Chinese mathematician

- 展涛

President of Jilin University
- In office November 2008 – February 2011
- Preceded by: Zhou Qifeng
- Succeeded by: Li Yuanyuan

President of Shandong University
- In office July 2000 – November 2008
- Preceded by: Zeng Fanren
- Succeeded by: Xu Xianming

Personal details
- Born: April 1963 (age 63) Yanzhou County, Shandong, China
- Party: Chinese Communist Party
- Education: Shandong University
- Scientific career
- Fields: Mathematics
- Workplaces: Shandong University; Jilin University

Chinese name
- Simplified Chinese: 展涛
- Traditional Chinese: 展濤
Transcriptions
Standard Mandarin
- Hanyu Pinyin: Zhǎn Tāo

Zhan Tao (Chinese: 展涛; born April 1963) is a Chinese mathematician who served as president of Jilin University from 2008 to 2011 and president of Shandong University from 2000 to 2008.

== Biography ==
Zhan was born in April 1963, in Yanzhou County (now Yanzhou District of Jining), Shandong. He graduated from the Department of Mathematics of Shandong University with a Ph.D. degree in mathematics under the supervision of Pan Chengdong in 1987. After graduation he became a professor of pure mathematics.

He was deputy dean of the Department of Mathematics and vice president of Shandong University, and was the president of Shandong University from July 2000 until November 2008. He is now a standing member of the Chinese Association of Mathematics, deputy director of the Young Scientist Association of China, a standing member of the All China Youth Federation, vice president of the Shandong Youth Federation, and board chairman of the Shandong Association of Mathematics.

Since joining the faculty of Shandong University in 1987, he has been working on classical problems in number theory such as estimates of exponential sums over primes, mean-value theorems for arithmetic progressions, and Goldbach's conjecture. In particular, he has solved the quadratic almost Goldbach conjecture, and has successfully proved a new form of the Three-Prime theorem in arithmetic progressions to large moduli. His results have been generalized by Trevor Wooley in various directions.

Zhan also participated in a co-research program at the Albert Ludwigs University of Freiburg in Germany from January 1991 through December 1992, and he has been invited by dozens of universities in France, the Netherlands and United States for short academic visits.

== Awards ==
Zhan has been awarded various prestigious honors including the Science and Technology Prize for Young Scientists of China, the Science and Technology Advancement Award by the Ministry of Education, the University Science and Technology Award of China, and the National Award for Outstanding Teaching Achievement.

Educational offices
| Preceded by Zeng Fanren | President of Shandong University; 2000–2008 | Succeeded by Xu Xianming |
| Preceded by Zhou Qifeng | President of Jilin University; 2008–2011 | Succeeded by Li Yuanyuan |
