= Mao Wanchun =

Chinese politician (born 1961)

- 毛万春

Chairman of the Hunan Provincial Committee of the Chinese People's Political Consultative Conference
- Incumbent
- Assumed office January 2023
- Preceded by: Li Weiwei

Chairman of the Hainan Provincial Committee of the Chinese People's Political Consultative Conference
- In office January 2018 – January 2023
- Preceded by: Yu Xun
- Succeeded by: Li Rongcan

Personal details
- Born: October 1961 (age 64–65) Tangyin County, Henan, China
- Party: Chinese Communist Party
- Education: Henan University

Chinese name
- Simplified Chinese: 毛万春
- Traditional Chinese: 毛萬春
Transcriptions
Standard Mandarin
- Hanyu Pinyin: Máo Wànchūn

Mao Wanchun (Chinese: 毛万春; born October 1961) is a Chinese politician who is the current chairman of the Hunan Provincial Committee of the Chinese People's Political Consultative Conference. He served as Chairman of the Hainan Provincial Committee of the Chinese People's Political Consultative Conference from January 2018 to January 2023. He was formerly Chinese Communist Party Deputy Committee Secretary of Shaanxi province. Mao spent much of his early career in his native Henan province, where he served as Party Chief of Luoyang.

== Biography ==
Mao was born in Tangyin County, Henan. He worked as a sent-down youth during the Cultural Revolution. He attended Henan University, where he obtained a degree in political instruction. His political career grew from his involvement in the Communist Youth League of China, becoming county governor of Lin County in 1991, at 30 years of age. In 1994, Mao became party chief of the newly founded city of Linzhou. He later served as deputy party chief of Zhoukou, mayor of Xuchang, then party chief of Xuchang. In July 2010 he was named to the provincial Party Standing Committee of Henan province, and became party chief of Luoyang.

Having entered the Central Committee of the Chinese Communist Party as an alternate in November 2012, in May the following year, Mao was tapped to replace Li Jinbin as the Organization Department head in Shaanxi province, leaving his native province for the first time. In August 2014, under Mao's leadership, the Shaanxi party leadership released a set of guidelines on the disclosure of assets of newly promoted public officials, the first province to issue guidelines of this kind. In October 2014, Mao was elevated from alternate to full membership on the committee after the expulsion of Jiang Jiemin from the body due to corruption.

In January 2023, he was transferred to Hunan and appointed chairman of the Hunan Provincial Committee of the Chinese People's Political Consultative Conference.

Mao was the third-ranked alternate of the 18th Central Committee of the Chinese Communist Party, meaning he received an overwhelming number of confirmation votes for his Central Committee membership at the 18th National Congress of the Chinese Communist Party in November 2012. In 2017 he was again elected an alternate of the 19th Central Committee.

Government offices
Preceded by Liu Chunliang	Mayor of Xuchang; 2001–2006	Succeeded by Li Ya
Party political offices
Preceded by Liu Chunliang	Communist Party Secretary of Xuchang; 2006–2010	Succeeded by Li Ya
Preceded by Lian Weiliang	Communist Party Secretary of Luoyang; 2010–2013	Succeeded by Chen Xuefeng
Preceded by Li Jinbin	Head of the Organization Department of Shaanxi Provincial Committee of the Chinese Communist Party; 2013–2016	Succeeded by Zhang Guangzhi
Preceded by Hu Heping	Deputy Party Secretary of Shaanxi; 2016–2018	Succeeded by He Rong
Assembly seats
Preceded by Yu Xun	Chairman of the Hainan Provincial Committee of the Chinese People's Political Consultative Conference; 2018–2023	Succeeded by Li Rongcan
Preceded by Li Weiwei	Chairman of the Hunan Provincial Committee of the Chinese People's Political Consultative Conference; 2023–present	Incumbent
