= Huang Jianfa =

Chinese politician

- 黄建发

Deputy Head of the Organization Department of the Chinese Communist Party
- Incumbent
- Assumed office 14 March 2023 Serving with Jiang Xinzhi, Li Xiaoxin, Peng Jinhui, Xu Qifang, and Zhang Guangjun [zh]
- Head: Chen Xi; Li Ganjie; Shi Taifeng

Specifically-designated Deputy Communist Party Secretary of Zhejiang
- In office June 2021 – March 2023
- Party Secretary: Yuan Jiajun; Yi Lianhong
- Preceded by: Zheng Shanjie

Personal details
- Born: January 1965 (age 61) Shaowu County, Fujian, China
- Party: Chinese Communist Party
- Education: Zhejiang University; Central Party School of the Chinese Communist Party

Chinese name
- Simplified Chinese: 黄建发
- Traditional Chinese: 黃建發
Transcriptions
Standard Mandarin
- Hanyu Pinyin: Huáng Jiànfā

Huang Jianfa (Chinese: 黄建发; born January 1965) is a Chinese politician, currently serving as a deputy head of the Organization Department of the Chinese Communist Party. He served as deputy party secretary of Zhejiang and secretary of the Political and Legal Affairs Commission of the CCP Zhejiang Provincial Committee.

== Early life and education ==
Huang was born in Shaowu County (now Shaowu), Fujian, in January 1965. In 1980, he was accepted to Zhejiang University, where he majored in areal geology. He began his postgraduate work at the Institute of Geology, China Earthquake Administration in 1984.

== Political career ==
Huang joined the Chinese Communist Party (CCP) in August 1987.

After university in 1987, Huang was despatched to the China Earthquake Administration, becoming deputy director of the Science and Technology Development Division (International Cooperation Division) in August 2002.

Huang was transferred to his home-province Fujian and appointed party branch secretary and director of Fujian Provincial Seismological Bureau in May 2003.

In August 2004, Huang was recalled to China Earthquake Administration and appointed director of the Earthquake Emergency Rescue Department.

In November 2010, Huang was admitted to member of the Standing Committee of the CCP Chengdu Municipal Committee, the city's top authority. He was chairman of Chengdu Municipal Federation of Trade Unions in March 2012 and subsequently secretary-general of the CCP Chengdu Municipal Committee in the following month. In June 2015, he became executive deputy head of the Organization Department of the CCP Chengdu Municipal Committee, rising to head in March 2017. He also served as president of the local Party School from April 2017 to July 2018.

Huang was assigned to the similar position in east China's Zhejiang province in July 2018. He was promoted to deputy party secretary of Zhejiang in June 2021, and concurrently served as head of the United Front Work Department since July. He was chosen as secretary of the Political and Legal Affairs Commission of the CCP Zhejiang Provincial Committee in July 2022.

In March 2023, Huang was appointed as a deputy head of the Organization Department of the Chinese Communist Party.

Huang was a representative of the 19th National Congress of the Chinese Communist Party. He is a representative of the 20th National Congress of the Chinese Communist Party and a member of the 20th Central Committee of the Chinese Communist Party.

Party political offices
Preceded by Fan Ruiping	Head of the Organization Department of Sichuan Provincial Committee of the Chinese Communist Party; 2017–2018	Succeeded by Wang Zhengpu
Preceded by Ren Zhenhe	Head of the Organization Department of Zhejiang Provincial Committee of the Chinese Communist Party; 2018–2022	Succeeded by Wang Cheng
Preceded by Xiong Jianping	Head of the United Front Work Department of the Zhejiang Provincial Committee of the Chinese Communist Party; 2021–2022	Succeeded by Qiu Qiwen
Preceded by Zheng Shanjie	Specifically-designated Deputy Communist Party Secretary of Zhejiang; 2021–2023	Vacant
Preceded by Wang Changrong	Secretary of the Political and Legal Affairs Commission of the Zhejiang Provincial Committee of the Chinese Communist Party; 2022–2023	Succeeded by Wang Chengguo
