= Wang Xiaoping =

Chinese politician

- 王晓萍
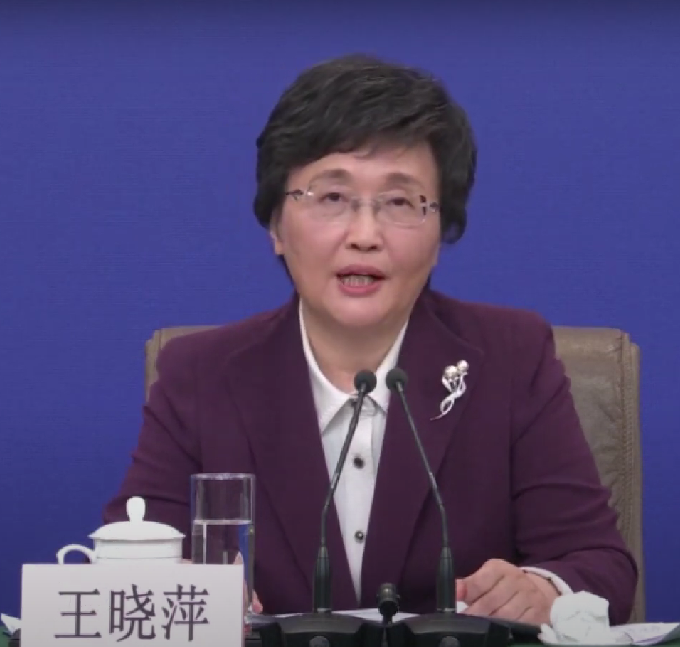
- Wang in 2024

Minister of Human Resources and Social Security
- Incumbent
- Assumed office 30 December 2022
- Premier: Li Keqiang; Li Qiang
- Preceded by: Zhou Zuyi

Personal details
- Born: March 1964 (age 62) Tuanfeng County, Hubei, China
- Party: Communist Party
- Education: China University of Political Science and Law

Chinese name
- Simplified Chinese: 王晓萍
- Traditional Chinese: 王曉萍
Transcriptions
Standard Mandarin
- Hanyu Pinyin: Wáng Xiǎopíng

Wang Xiaoping (Chinese: 王晓萍; pinyin: Wáng Xiǎopíng; born March 1964) is a Chinese politician who is the current Minister of Human Resources and Social Security, in office since 30 December 2022.

She is a representative of the 20th National Congress of the Chinese Communist Party and is a member of the Standing Committee of the 20th Central Commission for Discipline Inspection.

== Early life and education ==
Wang was born in Tuanfeng County, Hubei, in March 1964. In 1981, she entered China University of Political Science and Law, where she majored in law.

== Political career ==
Wang joined the Chinese Communist Party (CCP) in May 1988, upon graduation. After university in August 1988, she worked at Shougang Research and Development Corporation Law Institute.

Starting in September 1990, Wang served in several posts in the Policy Research Division of the Overseas Chinese Affairs Office of the State Council, including deputy division chief, division chief, deputy director, and director. She was director of the Foreign Division in October 2012 and subsequently deputy director of the Overseas Chinese Affairs Office in December 2015.

In March 2017, Wang was admitted to member of the Standing Committee of the CCP Jilin Provincial Committee, the province's top authority. She was head of the Publicity Department of the CCP Jilin Provincial Committee in April, in addition to serving as chairperson of Jilin Provincial Federation of Social Sciences since June. In May 2019, she became head of the Organization Department of the CCP Jilin Provincial Committee.

In October 2020, Wang was promoted to become deputy head of the Organization Department of the Chinese Communist Party, a position she held until December 2022. She was also a member of the Standing Committee of the Central Commission for Discipline Inspection (CCDI), the party's internal disciplinary body, and a member of the National Supervisory Commission, the highest anti-corruption agency of China.

On 30 December 2022, Wang was appointed Minister of Human Resources and Social Security, succeeding Zhou Zuyi.

Party political offices
Preceded by Gao Fuping	Head of the Publicity Department of Jilin Provincial Committee of the Chinese Communist Party; 2017–2019	Succeeded by Shi Yugang
Preceded by Wang Kai	Head of the Organization Department of Jilin Provincial Committee of the Chinese Communist Party; 2019–2020	Succeeded by Zhang Enhui
Government offices
Preceded by Zhou Zuyi	Minister of Human Resources and Social Security; 2022–present	Incumbent
