= Zhang Rong =

Zhang Rong may refer to:

- Zhang Rong (poet), Chinese official and poet
- Zhang Rong (physicist), Chinese physicist
- Jung Chang or Zhāng Róng, Chinese-British writer
