= Xu Xianming =

Chinese lawyer (born 1957)

Xu Xianming (Chinese: 徐显明; pinyin: Xú Xiǎnmíng; born April 12, 1957) is a Chinese lawyer who is considered China's leading authority on human rights law.

== Life and career ==
Xu Xianming was born in Laixi, a county-level city in the eastern part of Shandong that is administered by the city of Qingdao. After graduating from high school in 1974, he started to work in his hometown as a production team leader and middle school teacher in 1975. He entered Jilin University in 1978 and obtained first a bachelors (1982) and then a master's degree (1985) in law. He continued his studies at Wuhan University, where he was also awarded a doctoral degree in 1999.

From 1985 to 2001, he simultaneously held the positions of Law School Dean and Head of the Graduate School at Shandong University. In September 2001, he became president of the China University of Political Science and Law, one of the most renowned law schools in China. He held this office until November 2008, when he returned to Shandong University as president.

He served as president of Shandong University from November 2008 to October 2013. Since 2013, Xu has served as the deputy chief of the General Office serving the Central Commission for Comprehensive Social Management (Vice-Minister rank).

He has been a member of the 10th and 11th National People's Congress and serves as a commissioner for the Legal Commission of the Congress. He has also served as counselor of the National Labor Union and counselor of the Supreme People's Court. Internationally, he has served as Chinese Chairman of the World Congress of Philosophy of Law and Social Philosophy and Chinese Chairman of the China-United States Joint Commission on Legal Education.

Besides human rights, topics of Xu Xianming's research include legal trends in contemporary China, the Chinese Communist Party's legal doctrines, and principles for the rule of law.

Academic offices
| Preceded by Yang Yonglin | President of China University of Political Science and Law; 2001–2008 | Succeeded by Zhu Yong |
| Preceded by Zhan Tao | President of Shandong University; 2008–2013 | Succeeded by Zhang Rong |
