= You Zheng =

Chinese engineer (born 1963)

- 尤政

President of Huazhong University of Science and Technology
- Incumbent
- Assumed office 20 October 2021
- Preceded by: Li Yuanyuan

Personal details
- Born: 2 December 1963 (age 62) Yangzhou, Jiangsu, China
- Party: Chinese Communist Party
- Education: Huazhong University of Science and Technology
- Scientific career
- Fields: Mechatronics
- Workplaces: Huazhong University of Science and Technology

You Zheng (Chinese: 尤政; pinyin: Yòu Zhèng; born 2 December 1963) is a Chinese engineer who is an academician of the Chinese Academy of Engineering, a former vice president of Tsinghua University, and currently present of Huazhong University of Science and Technology.

== Biography ==
You was born in Yangzhou, Jiangsu, on 2 December 1963. He secondary studied at Yangzhou High School of Jiangsu Province. He earned a bachelor's degree in 1985, a master's degree in 1987, and a doctor's degree in 1990, all from Central China University of Science and Engineering (now Huazhong University of Science and Technology). After graduating in June 1990, You joined the Department of Mechanical Engineering faculty and soon carried out postdoctoral research at Tsinghua University in November of that same year.

You taught at Tsinghua University since December 1992, what he was promoted to professor in 1994 and director of the Department of Precision Instrument in 2005. In 2007, he was appointed dean of the School of Mechanical Engineering. After this office was terminated in 2014, he was given an administrative position of vice president, serving until 2021.

On 30 May 2021, he was proposed as vice president of China Association for Science and Technology. On 20 October 2021, he was promoted to president of Huazhong University of Science and Technology, a position at vice-ministerial level.

== Honors and awards ==
- 2007 State Science and Technology Progress Award (Second Class)
- 2011 State Technological Invention Award (Second Class)
- 2012 State Technological Invention Award (Second Class)
- 2013 Member of the Chinese Academy of Engineering (CAE)
- 2019 State Technological Invention Award (Second Class)

Educational offices
Preceded by Li Yuanyuan	President of Huazhong University of Science and Technology; 2021–present	Incumbent
