= Liu Chunliang =

Chinese politician

Liu Chunliang (born March 1954, Chinese: 刘春良), a native of Yanzhou, Shandong Province, is a Chinese politician.

== Biography ==
Liu Chunliang earned his degree in Chinese from the Chinese Department of Kaifeng Normal College (now Henan University) and subsequently attained a master's degree in business management from the Capital University of Economics and Business. Liu Chunliang became a member of the Chinese Communist Party in 1982.

In September 2010, he returned to the Standing Committee of the CCP Henan Provincial Committee, subsequently assuming the role of Secretary General of the Provincial Committee in February 2011. In January 2014, he was appointed deputy director of the Standing Committee of the Henan Provincial People's Congress. In September 2014, he was designated as the Secretary of the Party Group of the Standing Committee of the Henan Provincial People's Congress. On February 24, 2018, he was chosen as a delegate to the 13th National People's Congress.

Party political offices
Previous: Cao Weixin	Secretary-General of the CCP Henan Provincial Committee	Next: Li Wenhui
Previous: Yang Duoliang	Secretary of the Discipline Inspection Committee of the Chinese Communist Party in Anhui Province	Next: Wang Bingyi
Previous: Chen Xianzhong	Secretary of the CCP Henan Provincial Committee Education Work Committee	Next: Cheng Yi (politician)
Previous: Kong Yufang	Secretary of the CCP Xuchang Municipal Committee	Next: Mao Wanchun
Government offices
Previous: Niu Xuezhong	Mayor of Xuchang	Next: Mao Wanchun
