= Li Rongcan =

Chinese politician

- 李荣灿

Chairman of the Hainan Provincial Committee of the Chinese People's Political Consultative Conference
- Incumbent
- Assumed office January 2023
- Preceded by: Mao Wanchun

Personal details
- Born: September 1966 (age 60) Shaoxing, Zhejiang, China
- Party: Chinese Communist Party
- Education: Jiangxi University of Finance and Economics; University of International Business and Economics

Chinese name
- Simplified Chinese: 李荣灿
- Traditional Chinese: 李榮燦
Transcriptions
Standard Mandarin
- Hanyu Pinyin: Lǐ Róngcàn

Li Rongcan (Chinese: 李荣灿; born September 1966) is a Chinese politician, serving as chairman of the Hainan Provincial Committee of the Chinese People's Political Consultative Conference since January 2023.

Li was a representative of the 19th and is a representative of the 20th National Congress of the Chinese Communist Party. He is an alternate of the 20th Central Committee of the Chinese Communist Party. He is a member of the 14th National Committee of the Chinese People's Political Consultative Conference.

== Early life and education ==
Li was born in Shaoxing, Zhejiang, in September 1966, the year the Cultural Revolution broke out. In 1985, he entered Jiangxi College of Finance and Economics (now Jiangxi University of Finance and Economics), where he majored in accounting. He joined the Chinese Communist Party (CCP) in March 1987 during his sophomore year. In 2000, he obtained his MBA degree from the University of International Business and Economics.

== Career ==
After graduation in 1989, Li was assigned as official to the Ministry of Foreign Trade and Economic Co-operation, which was reshuffled as the Ministry of Commerce in 2003. There, he assumed various posts and was finally elevated to assistant minister in January 2011.

Li was appointed vice governor of northwest China's Gansu province in January 2013 and in June 2015 was admitted to standing committee member of the CCP Gansu Provincial Committee, the province's top authority. He was party secretary of Lanzhou in October 2016, in addition to serving as first secretary of the Party Working Committee of Lanzhou New Area.

In April 2021, Li was transferred to central China's Hubei province, where he was made head of the Organization Department of the CCP Hubei Provincial Committee and president of the CCP Hubei Provincial Party School. He was also admitted to standing committee member of the CCP Hubei Provincial Committee, the province's top authority. In March 2022, he rose to specifically designated deputy party secretary, succeeded Wang Ruilian.

In January 2023, Li took office as chairman of the Hainan Provincial Committee of the Chinese People's Political Consultative Conference, the provincial advisory body.

Government offices
Preceded by Yuan Quan	Director of the Finance Department of the Ministry of Commerce of the People's Republic of China; 2006–2009	Succeeded by Xu Jia'ai
Preceded by Chai Haitao	Director of the Policy Research Office of the Ministry of Commerce of the People's Republic of China; 2009–2011	Succeeded by Zhang Xiangchen
Party political offices
Preceded by Yu Haiyan	Communist Party Secretary of Lanzhou; 2016–2021	Succeeded by Zhu Tianshu
Preceded by Wang Ruilian	Head of the Organization Department of Hubei Provincial Committee of the Chinese Communist Party; 2021–2022	Succeeded by Zhang Wenbing
Preceded by Wang Ruilian	Specifically-designated Deputy Communist Party Secretary of Hubei; 2022–2023	Succeeded by Zhuge Yujie
Assembly seats
Preceded by Mao Wanchun	Chairman of the Hainan Provincial Committee of the Chinese People's Political Consultative Conference; 2023–present	Incumbent
