= Zeng Fanren =

Chinese academic

President of Shandong University
- In office February 1998 – July 2000
- Preceded by: Pan Chengdong
- Succeeded by: Zhan Tao

Personal details
- Born: 10 January 1941 Jing County, Anhui, Republic of China
- Party: Chinese Communist Party
- Children: 2

Zeng Fanren (Chinese: 曾繁仁; pinyin: Zēng Fánrén; born 10 January 1941) was the president of Shandong University from February 1998 until July 2000 and prior to his title of university president he was Executive Vice President. He is a leading professor in the field of aesthetics and a founding father of contemporary Chinese ecological aesthetics.

== Life ==
He was born on January 10, 1941 in Jing County, Anhui. In July 1964, he graduated from the department of Chinese language and literature and would later join the school faculty that same year. He was promoted in 1978 to the rank of lecturer. In 1981, he began to delve into theory and practice of aesthetic education and published several monographs during his exploration of the field. By 1987 he had become a professor and would also serve over the years as the universities Provost, Deputy director and Secretary of the Communist Party Group of the Shandong Provincial Education Commission. In 1998, he was promoted to the title of the university president which was a title he held for two years before being forced to step down for political reasons. From October 2004 to February 2005, he visited the Victoria university of British Columbia Canada as a high level visiting scholar. Zeng currently is the Director of the Research Center for Literary and Artistic Aesthetics as well as having the titles of Chief Expert in Shandong University's "985" Project in "Aesthetic Culture Research" and Chief Expert in the "Western Literary Theory" Project of the Ministry of Education's National Project of Marxist Theory Research and Construction.

== Awards and Prizes ==
Fanren has been awarded many prizes and awards which include but are not limited to the Shandong Province Prize for Mentorship of Outstanding Doctoral Students many times. In 1994, and again in 2003, he won a Level 2 Prize for Outstanding Academic Achievement in the Social Sciences in Shandong Province, and a Level 1 Prize for Outstanding Academic Achievement in the Social Sciences in Shandong Province in 2007. In 2011, Professor Zeng was the recipient of Shandong Province's Fifth Annual Prize for Most Outstanding Contribution to the Social Sciences, and at the same time a Ministry of Education Level 3 Prize in the Social Sciences.

Academic offices
Preceded by Pan Chengdong	President of Shandong University; 1998–2000	Succeeded by Zhan Tao
