= Wang Xiaoyun =

Chinese computer scientist

- Born: 1966 (age 59–60); Zhucheng, Shandong Province
- Education: Shandong University
- Known for: Cryptanalysis and hash function design
- Awards: Fellow of the International Association for Cryptologic Research (IACR, 2019), China's Future Science Prize (2019)
- Scientific career
- Fields: Cryptography, Mathematics, Computer Science
- Workplaces: Shandong University, Tsinghua University
- Thesis: (1993)
- Doctoral advisor: Pan Chengdong

Wang Xiaoyun (simplified Chinese: 王小云; traditional Chinese: 王小雲; pinyin: Wáng Xiǎoyún; born 1966) is a Chinese cryptographer, mathematician, and computer scientist. She is a professor in the Department of Mathematics and System Science of Shandong University and an academician of the Chinese Academy of Sciences.

== Early life and education ==
Wang was born in Zhucheng, Shandong Province. She gained bachelor's (1987), master's (1990) and doctorate (1993) degrees at Shandong University, and subsequently lectured in the mathematics department from 1993. Her doctoral advisor was Pan Chengdong. Wang was appointed assistant professor in 1995, and full professor in 2001. She became the Chen Ning Yang Professor of the Center for Advanced Study, Tsinghua University in 2005.

== Career and research ==
At the rump session of CRYPTO 2004, she and co-authors demonstrated collision attacks against MD5, SHA-0 and other related hash functions (a collision occurs when two distinct messages result in the same hash function output). They received a standing ovation for their work. In CRYPTO 2024, Xiaoyun and her colleagues (not present at the conference) were awarded the rump session time of test award and received another standing ovation for her rump session in 2004.

In February 2005, it was reported that Wang and co-authors Yiqun Lisa Yin and Hongbo Yu had found a method to find collisions in the SHA-1 hash function, which is used in many of today's mainstream security products. Their attack is estimated to require less than 2^{69} operations, far fewer than the 2^{80} operations previously thought needed to find a collision in SHA-1. Their work was published at the CRYPTO '05 conference. In August 2005, an improved attack on SHA-1, discovered by Wang, Andrew Yao and Frances Yao, was announced at the CRYPTO conference rump session. The time complexity of the new attack is claimed to be 2^{63}.

== Awards and honors ==
In 2019, she was named a Fellow of the International Association for Cryptologic Research (IACR) for "For essential contributions to the cryptanalysis and design of hash functions, and for service to the IACR." In 2019, she became the first female winner of China's Future Science Prize for her pioneering contribution in cryptography. In 2020, she was awarded the Levchin Prize "for groundbreaking work on the security of collision resistant hash functions". The following year, she became a laureate of the Asian Scientist 100 by the Asian Scientist.
