= Office of the Central Integrated Military and Civilian Development Commission =

Chinese government agency

- 中央军民融合发展委员会办公室
- Emblem of the Chinese Communist Party

Agency overview
- Type: Administrative agency of the Central Integrated Military and Civilian Development Commission
- Jurisdiction: Chinese Communist Party
- Headquarters: No. 38 Yuetan South Street, Xicheng District, Beijing
- Agency executives: Shao Xinyu, Director; Pei Jinjia, Deputy Director
- Parent agency: Central Integrated Military and Civilian Development Commission

Chinese name
- Simplified Chinese: 中央军民融合发展委员会办公室
- Traditional Chinese: 中央軍民融合發展委員會辦公室
Transcriptions
Standard Mandarin
- Hanyu Pinyin: Zhōngyāng Jūnmín Rónghé Fāzhǎn Wěiyuánhuì Bàngōngshì

Abbreviation
- Simplified Chinese: 中央军民融合办
- Traditional Chinese: 中央軍民融合辦
Transcriptions
Standard Mandarin
- Hanyu Pinyin: Zhōngyāng Jūnmín Rónghébàn

The Office of the Central Integrated Military and Civilian Development Commission is the administrative agency of the Central Integrated Military and Civilian Development Commission, a policy formulation body of the Central Committee of the Chinese Communist Party (CCP).

== History ==
After the promulgation of the Constitution of the People's Republic of China in 1954, the national system of the People's Republic of China gradually improved. In January 1955, Soviet adviser Bankov proposed the establishment of a "Military Economic Planning Bureau" in the State Planning Commission of the People's Republic of China (hereinafter referred to as the "State Planning Commission"), which was adopted by the Central Committee of the Chinese Communist Party. In November 1955, the State Planning Commission organized a delegation to visit the Soviet Union for more than a month to study the construction of national economic mobilization. From then on, the comprehensive establishment of the national defense mobilization system of the People's Republic of China began. According to the suggestions of the inspection team and the needs of mobilization work, the State Planning Commission submitted to the State Council the "Report on the Establishment of Economic Mobilization Planning Organization" and the "Report on the Mobilization Organizations of Relevant Departments and the Preparation of Long-term Plans for Mobilization Work". After the State Council approved it, the government's economic departments quickly established special mobilization organizations from top to bottom.

In 1956, the State Planning Commission established the National Economic Mobilization Bureau of the State Planning Commission, which was responsible for accepting the needs of the army in economic mobilization, formulating long-term plans for the growth of mobilization capabilities and annual plans for wartime mobilization, determining national reserves and mobilization reserves, coordinating mobilization work in the economic field, and providing work guidance to the mobilization bureaus (departments) of the ministries and commissions under the State Council. At the same time, the State Economic Commission established the Economic Mobilization Planning Inspection Office, which was responsible for inspecting the progress of production preparations and capital construction for mobilization tasks in peacetime. In July of the same year, the Ministry of Railways and the Ministry of Posts and Telecommunications both established mobilization bureaus; the First Ministry of Machine Building, the Second Ministry of Machine Building, the Ministry of Metallurgy, the Ministry of Communications, the Ministry of Textiles, and the Ministry of Electric Motor Manufacturing all set up mobilization offices under the Planning Department; the Ministry of Chemical Industry, the Ministry of Coal, the Ministry of Petroleum, and the Ministry of Electronics set up full-time cadres in the relevant departments to be responsible for economic mobilization management; each department of the second-level ministry set up a mobilization planning office (section), and most military industrial enterprises set up a mobilization planning section. The above-mentioned mobilization agencies accepted the work guidance of the National Economic Mobilization Bureau of the State Planning Commission.

Later, the National Defense Department of the State Planning Commission was established to be responsible for national economic mobilization. In March 1998, when the State Council reorganized its institutions, the former Commission of Science, Technology and Industry for National Defense of the People's Republic of China was reorganized into the General Armament Department of the People's Liberation Army of China, and a new government department, the Commission of Science, Technology and Industry for National Defense of the People's Republic of China, was established. The functions of the former Commission of Science, Technology and Industry for National Defense in managing the defense industry, the functions of the National Defense Department of the State Planning Commission, and the government functions undertaken by various military industrial corporations were all brought under the management of the newly established Commission of Science, Technology and Industry for National Defense.

During the institutional reform of the State Council in March 1998, the State Planning Commission of the People's Republic of China was changed to the National Development Planning Commission of the People's Republic of China, under which the National Economic Mobilization Office of the National Development Planning Commission was established.

In 2003, the National Development Planning Commission of the People's Republic of China was reorganized into the National Development and Reform Commission of the People's Republic of China, under which the National Economic Mobilization Office of the National Development and Reform Commission was established.

Around 2014, it was renamed the National Development and Reform Commission's Department of Economic and Defense Coordination Development (abbreviated as "NDRC Defense Department").

In 2017, the Central Military and Civilian Integration Development Commission was established, with the Central Military and Civilian Integration Development Commission Office as its administrative agency. The responsibilities of the National Defense Department of the National Development and Reform Commission were merged into the Central Military and Civilian Integration Office. Wang Shunian, former director of the Economic and Defense Coordination Development Department of the National Development and Reform Commission, was appointed director of the Secretariat (Personnel Bureau).

In early 2019, the National Development and Reform Commission re-established the Department of Economic and Defense Coordination Development.

== Organizational structure ==
=== Internal organization ===
- Secretariat (Personnel Bureau)
- Strategic Planning Bureau
- Coordination Bureau
- Policy and Regulation Bureau

=== Directly affiliated institutions ===
- Military-Civilian Integration Development Promotion Center

== Leaders ==
=== Directors ===
- Zhang Gaoli (2017–2018)
- Han Zheng (2018-?)

=== Deputy Directors ===
- Jin Zhuanglong (2017-July 2022, Executive Deputy Director, Minister-level)
- Sun Shaocheng (2018-April 2022, Minister of Veterans Affairs )
- Wang Shunian (2018-?)
- Pei Jinjia (2022-, Minister of Veterans Affairs)
- Lei Fanpei (July 2022 -?, Executive Deputy Director, Minister-level)
- Yin Weijun (November 2024 -)
- Shao Xinyu (April 2025 -, Executive Deputy Director, Minister-level)
