= Anhui University of Technology =

University in Ma'anshan, Anhui, China

- 安徽工业大学
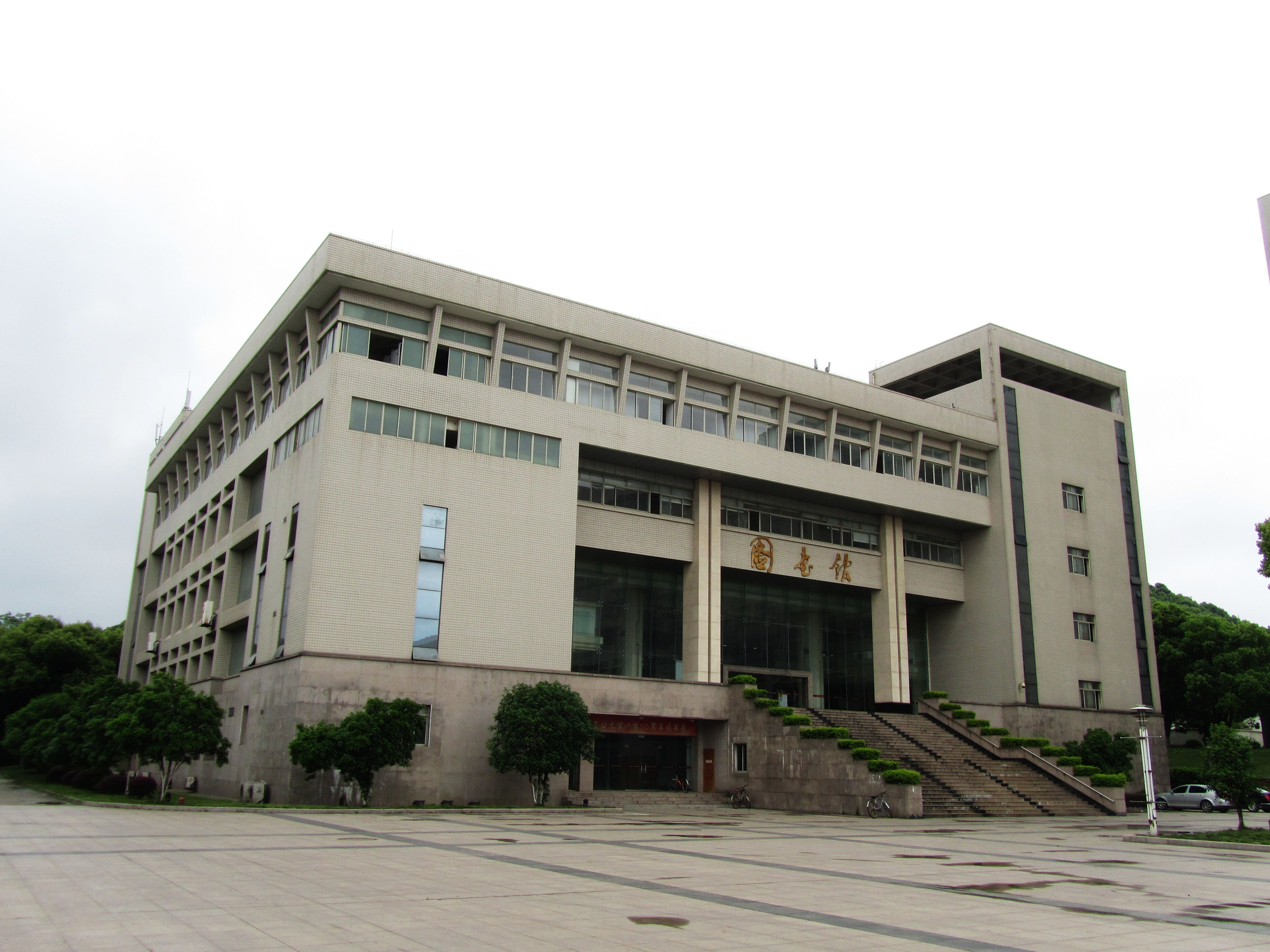
- Motto: "Being Solidary, Seeking Truth, Working Hard, Making Innovations"
- Type: Public university
- Established: 1958
- President: Cen.Yuwan
- Academic staff: 1,100
- Administrative staff: 1,700
- Students: 20,000
- Location: Ma'anshan, Anhui, China
- Campus: 2,850 mu
- Website: http://www.ahut.edu.cn/

Anhui University of Technology (simplified Chinese: 安徽工业大学; traditional Chinese: 安徽工業大學; pinyin: Ānhuī Gōngyè Dàxué) is a university based in Ma'anshan, Anhui, China. It offers instruction in engineering, economics, management, literature, science and law. It is more accurate to consider it an industrial university, catering to the needs of local industries like Ma Steel.

Anhui University of Technology (AHUT) offers a wide range of programs and courses including engineering, economics, management, literature, science and law while laying emphasis on engineering. The university is located in Ma’anshan city Anhui Province, which has been granted with many national titles “A National Garden City”, “Top Quality Environment City”, “National Tourism City” and “A Flower alongside South Bank of Yangtz River” and with half an hour's drive to Nanjing, “Capital City for Six Dynasties in Ancient China” and 4 hours’ drive to Shanghai all by expressway.

Anhui University of Technology covers an area of 1.87 million square meters and has more than 1.65 million library collections (including electronic ones). The university has 20,000 full-time students and 2,000 staff members from the whole nation. AHUT has 16 schools: Metallurgy and Resources, Material Science and Engineering, Chemistry and Chemical Engineering, Construction Engineering, Electrical Engineering and Information, Arts and Law, Foreign Languages, Mathematics and Physics, Postgraduates Education, Continuing Education, Vocational Education, and Physical Education. The university offers 43 bachelor-degree programs, 3 dual-bachelor-degree programs, 31 master-degree programs, and 4 engineering master-degree programs. Since 1995, the university has successfully jointly trained doctors with renowned foreign universities. In 2001, AHUT started to accept foreign students. AHUT has 12 provincial-level labs and research centers. In the past two years, AHUT has got over 40 awards with provincial –level or above, 24 patents, and 4000 papers published including more than 200 employed by SCI, EI etc.. In 2004, the university won Excellent Grade for its teaching quality evaluated by State Ministry of Education. In Ma’anshan Hi-tech Plaza, the university has constructed an area for science and technology development. Yearly output value of the university's industry exceeds 200 million Yuan.

The International Affairs Office and International Exchange Center are responsible for the university's international cooperation and exchange affairs. The university has carried out long-term academic exchange and cooperation with over 20 higher institutions in more than 10 countries, in the fields of industrial technology, management, culture, economics and education, AHUT has established quite a few international research centers and institutes to carry out inter-collegial and inter-governmental scientific research projects. The university also carries out students exchange programs with universities in America, Korea, Germany, Sweden, etc..

AHUT is always ready for potential cooperation and exchanges with international partners for common prosperity

== Scientific research institutes ==
- National Engineering Research Center for High-efficiency Recycling of Metal Mineral Resources
- Anhui Provincial Key Lab. of Metallurgical Eng. and Resources Recycling
- Anhui Provincial Key Lab. of Companies Management and Operation
- Anhui Provincial University Key Lab. of Metal Materials and Processing
- Anhui Provincial Key Lab. of Power Electronics and Motion Control
- Research Institute of Sino-Korea Industrial Technology, Anhui University of Technology and Changwon National University
- Research Institute of Sino-Ukraine Economy, Anhui University of Technology and National Technical University “Kharkiv Polytechnic Institute”
- Research Institute of Economy and Culture, Anhui University of Technology and Japanese Sapporo University
- Research Institute of Coal Chemical Industry
- Research Institute of Metallurgical Process Emulation Technology
- Research Institute of New Process and Technology for Iron-making
- Research Institute of Laser Application
- Research Institute of Molding Technology
- Research Institute of Applied Chemistry
- Research Institute of Chemical Automation
- Research Institute of Architectural Design
- Research Institute of Mechanical Engineering
- Research Institute of Engineering Dynamics
- Research Center of Digital Control
- Research Institute of Automation
- Research Institute of Measuring and Control Technology
- Research Institute of Computer Application
- Research Institute of Accounting Management
- Research Center of Modern Logistics
- Research Center of ERP

== See also ==
- List of universities and colleges in Anhui
- List of universities in China
