= Zhao Long =

Chinese politician (born 1967)

- 赵龙
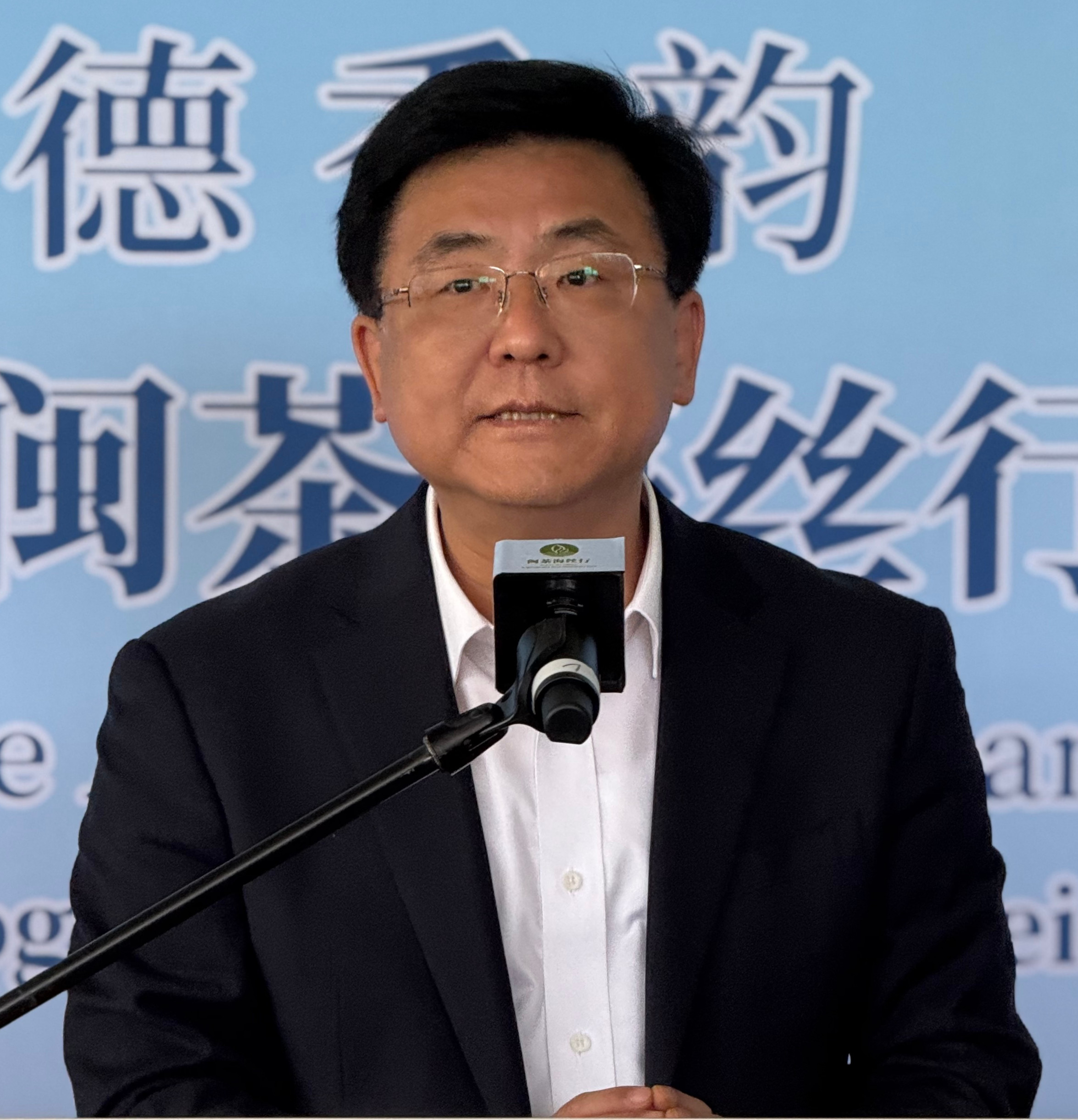
- Zhao in 2025

Party Secretary of Fujian
- Incumbent
- Assumed office 23 September 2026
- Deputy: Guo Ningning (Acting Governor); Lin Tao
- Preceded by: Zhou Zuyi

Governor of Fujian
- In office 22 October 2021 – 4 November 2026
- Party Secretary: Yin Li; Zhou Zuyi; Himself
- Preceded by: Wang Ning
- Succeeded by: Guo Ningning

Personal details
- Born: September 1967 (age 59) Panjin, Liaoning, China
- Party: Chinese Communist Party
- Education: Renmin University of China; Beijing University

Chinese name
- Simplified Chinese: 赵龙
- Traditional Chinese: 趙龍
Transcriptions
Standard Mandarin
- Hanyu Pinyin: Zhào Lóng

Zhao Long (Chinese: 赵龙; born September 1967) is a Chinese politician who is the current Party Secretary of Fujian.

== Biography ==
Zhao was born in Panjin, Liaoning, in September 1967. He joined the Chinese Communist Party in December 1988. After graduating from the Renmin University of China in 1989, he was despatched to the National Land Administration, which was reshuffled as the Ministry of Land and Resources in 1998 and Ministry of Natural Resources in 2018. He moved up the ranks to become vice minister in June 2016, a position at vice-ministerial level.

In July 2020, he was appointed vice governor of southeast China's Fujian province and was admitted to member of the standing committee of the CPC Fujian Provincial Committee, the province's top authority. In January 2021, he took office as party secretary of Xiamen, replacing Hu Changsheng, who was promoted to governor of Heilongjiang. On 22 October, he rose to become the acting governor of Fujian, becoming the youngest head of provincial administrative region government in China. On 25 January 2022, he was elected as the governor of Fujian. On 23 September 2026, he was appointed as the Party Secretary of Fujian.

Government offices
Preceded by Zhang Zhinan	Executive Vice Governor of Fujian; 2020–2021	Succeeded by Zheng Xincong
Preceded by Wang Ning	Governor of Fujian; 2021–2026	Succeeded by Guo Ningning
Party political offices
Preceded by Hu Changsheng	Party Secretary of Xiamen; 2021	Succeeded by Cui Yonghui
Preceded by Zhou Zuyi	Party Secretary of Fujian; 2026 - present	Incumbent
