= Military–civil fusion =

Strategy of the Chinese Communist Party

Military–civil fusion (Chinese: 军民融合; pinyin: Jūnmín rónghé, MCF) or civil–military fusion is a strategy and policy of the Chinese Communist Party (CCP) with the stated goal of developing its People's Liberation Army (PLA) into a world-class military. Military–civil fusion is a priority for Xi Jinping and is coordinated by the Central Integrated Military and Civilian Development Commission of the Central Committee of the Chinese Communist Party.

== Background ==
The institutional foundations of PLA's weapon development and research were copied from the Soviet Union, where state-owned factories and companies develop and manufacture equipment based on a top-down command approach. Other major weaknesses have historically included monopoly in the defense industry held by state-owned companies, bureaucratic inefficacy, corruption, lack of innovation, outdated pricing and contracting process. Chinese state-owned defense corporations have been inclined toward the preservation of their state-sanctioned monopoly, exploiting their gain in a privileged position due to obstruction of competition with private enterprises. China's MCF efforts came about, in part, in response to these institutional weaknesses.

China's approach to civil-military fusion was in part influenced by the United States of America's approach.

== History ==
The term "military–civil fusion" first emerged in the late 1990s. Hu Jintao, then-vice chairman of the CCP's Central Military Commission, uses the term to describe the coordination between civic and military sectors. The concept of "military–civil fusion" dates back to Mao Zedong and the founding of the People's Republic of China (PRC). Defense analysts have noted that military–civil fusion efforts under current CCP general secretary Xi Jinping are more ambitious than those of his predecessors.

MCF was first used in 1980s primarily for converting military factories over to civilian production under the backdrop of the reform and opening up period, which failed to bring innovative commercial technologies into the military sector. The PLA acquired defense product through state-owned enterprises, while private companies only had limited contribution and involvement. Corruption and graft also contributed to the continuous preference toward state-owned companies, even when alternative options existed. Certain areas of development in China's military–industrial complex did see some benefits from the military–civilian integration, particularly for the shipbuilding, information technology, and aerospace industry.

Analysts Elsa B. Kania and Lorand Laskai noted Xi Jinping's initiative may lead to a breakthrough in efficiency and innovations, however, the initiative indicates China's attempt to overcome military procurement and research and development (R&D) deficiencies instead of a sign of strength. Richard A. Bitzinger believes MCF would requires significant effort and resources to implement successfully, given the current legal, regulatory, and cultural hurdles that exist in the Chinese government. Analyst Christian Brose argues that Chinese military capabilities have improved significantly in the 2010s due to relative success in fusing the defense and civilian sector for military development and production.

Emily Weinstein noted that the Chinese government has studied the U.S. military–civil framework, with research papers examining the successes and drawbacks of its implementation in the United States, such as Pentagon's Defense Innovation Unit, Defense Advanced Research Projects Agency (DARPA). China recognized the technological superiority the U.S. has achieved through collaboration between the U.S. government institutions and leading technologies companies in the U.S., such as the case of SpaceX, Amazon, Microsoft, and Google. China attempted to replicate and modified the framework as per domestic needs. However, the Chinese government can demand information and assistance from companies with more hardline approach than that of the United States.

== General policies ==
MCF promotes the use of dual-use technology and two-way technology transfer, in which defense companies, universities, and research institutions can collaborate and share technologies between military and civilian sectors. The term "civil–military integration" (CMI) was gradually replaced by the term "military–civil fusion" under the Xi Jinping administration, possibly inkling the latter has increased level of coordination in civil–military relations or a more balanced attention between military and civilian developments.

MCF influences investment decisions, talent recruitment, and research and development (R&D) across multiple fields. In January 2017, Xi Jinping created a Central Military–Civil Fusion Development Committee (CMCFDC), which is responsible for the planning and implementation of the MCF in China. Artificial intelligence has been a particular focus of MCF.

In 2021, China implemented a Five-Year Plan to set overall guidance for policies and national development goals through 2025. The document called for further coordination in the development of critical and emergent technologies, which is in-line with the goal of military–civil fusion.

In 2021, Janes Information Services reported that a purpose of the military–civil fusion is to ease the administrative burden and barriers on private defense companies, and stimulate greater competition and innovation in China's defense industry.

== Responses ==
Several U.S. government agencies have deployed their own definitions of military–civil fusion. In May 2020, the Trump administration issued a presidential proclamation banning certain Chinese students and researchers from coming to the United States based on their perceived relationship with military–civil fusion. The executive order describes military–civil fusion as a mean to "acquire and divert foreign technologies". Other analysts asserted that the definition is largely divorced from the purpose and objective of military–civil fusion and that instead it describes China's general issues on technology transfer.

Multiple analysts and think tanks have proposed ways in which the US could respond to China's MCF strategy.

== See also ==
- 2015 People's Republic of China military reform
- Foreign policy of China
- Double Supports
