= Zhang Xi (chemist) =

Chinese chemist

- 张希

President of Jilin University
- Incumbent
- Assumed office 13 December 2018
- Preceded by: Li Yuanyuan

Personal details
- Born: December 1965 (age 60) Benxi, Liaoning, China
- Party: Chinese Communist Party
- Education: Jilin University
- Scientific career
- Fields: Polymer chemistry
- Workplaces: Jilin University

Chinese name
- Simplified Chinese: 张希
- Traditional Chinese: 張希
Transcriptions
Standard Mandarin
- Hanyu Pinyin: Zhāng Xī

Zhang Xi (Chinese: 张希; born December 1965) is a Chinese chemist and the current president of Jilin University. He is a chemist and a member of the Chinese Academy of Sciences.

== Early life ==
Zhang was born in Benxi, Liaoning in 1965, he received his bachelor's degree in chemistry from Jilin University. He then received his masters and Ph.D. degrees in chemistry from the same university in 1989 and 1992 respectively.

== Career ==
Zhang became a lecturer at Jilin University from 1993 to 1994. From 1994 to 2003, he became a professor of chemistry at the same university. Since 2003, he has been a professor of chemistry at Tsinghua University in Beijing, China. He then became associate dean of the faculty of science at the university. In 2018, he became the president of Jilin University.

== Awards ==
Zhang was elected a member of the Chinese Academy of Sciences in 2007. He was awarded "Fellow" of the University of Tokyo in 2013.

Educational offices
Preceded by Li Yuanyuan	President of Jilin University; 2018–present	Incumbent
