= Shao Xinyu =

Chinese engineer (born 1968)

- 邵新宇

Vice Governor of Hubei
- In office September 2022 – May 2025
- Governor: Wang Zhonglin

Vice Minister of Science and Technology
- In office September 2021 – September 2022
- Minister: Wang Zhigang

Communist Party Secretary of Huazhong University of Science and Technology
- In office December 2017 – September 2021
- Preceded by: Lu Gang
- Succeeded by: Li Yuanyuan

Personal details
- Born: November 1968 (age 57) Jingjiang, Jiangsu, China
- Party: Chinese Communist Party
- Education: Huazhong University of Science and Technology; University of Michigan
- Scientific career
- Fields: Mechanical engineering
- Workplaces: Huazhong University of Science and Technology

Shao Xinyu (Chinese: 邵新宇; pinyin: Shào Xīnyǔ; born November 1967) is a Chinese engineer and politician who served as a deputy director of the Office of the Central Integrated Military and Civilian Development Commission. He previously served as Chinese Communist Party Committee Secretary of Huazhong University of Science and Technology from 2017 to 2021, as a vice minister of Science and Technology from 2021 to 2022, and as a vice governor of Hubei from 2022 to 2025.

== Early life ==
Shao was born in Jingjiang, Jiangsu, in November 1968. His father Shao Daosheng (邵道生) is a researcher at the Institute of Sociology, Chinese Academy of Social Sciences. He attended Jingjiang High School. He earned a bachelor's degree in 1986, a master's degree in 1990, and a doctor's degree in 1992, all from Huazhong University of Science and Technology. He pursued advanced studies in the United States, earning a doctor's degree from the University of Michigan. He was a research assistant at Ford Motor Company between June 1996 and August 1998.

== Career ==
He joined the mechanics faculty of Huazhong University of Science and Technology in December 1998 and was promoted to dean in October 2002. In July 2013, he became executive vice-president, a position at department level (正厅级). In December 2017 he was promoted to Chinese Communist Party Committee Secretary of the university, a position at vice-ministerial level.

In September 2021, he was appointed vice minister of Science and Technology by the State Council. He was removed from the position in September 2022, and was appointed as a vice governor of Hubei. In September 2023, he was appointed as a member of the Standing Committee of the Hubei Provincial Committee of the CCP.

In April 2025, Shao was appointed as a deputy director of the Office of the Central Integrated Military and Civilian Development Commission.

== Honors and awards ==
- November 2018 Science and Technology Award of the Ho Leung Ho Lee Foundation
- November 22, 2019 Member of the Chinese Academy of Engineering (CAE)

Party political offices
Preceded by Lu Gang	Communist Party Secretary of Huazhong University of Science and Technology; 2017–2021	Succeeded by Li Yuanyuan
Government offices
Preceded by Dong Weimin	Standing Deputy Governor of the Hubei Provincial People's Government; 2023–2025	Succeeded by Zhang Wenbing
