= Wuhan Polytechnic University =

Provincial public university in Wuhan, Hubei, China

Wuhan Polytechnic University (Chinese: 武汉轻工大学; pinyin: Wǔhàn Qīnggōng Dàxué; lit. 'Wuhan Light Industry University') is a provincial public university in Wuhan, Hubei, China. It is located in the Evergreen Garden (Chang Qing Hua Yuan) real estate development north of Hankou, near Tianhe Airport.

WHPU is a multidisciplinary comprehensive university that focuses on food science and engineering. It has about 16,000 full-time students. The university develops agricultural products for processing and transformation.
