= Central Institutional Organization Commission =

Body of the Central Committee of the Chinese Communist Party

- 中央机构编制委员会
- Emblem of the Chinese Communist Party

Agency overview
- Formed: 1991; 35 years ago
- Type: Policy coordination and consultation body
- Jurisdiction: Chinese Communist Party
- Headquarters: Dongsi, Dongcheng District, Beijing
- Agency executives: Li Qiang, Director; Cai Qi, Deputy Director; Zhang Jinan, Office Director
- Parent agency: Central Committee of the Chinese Communist Party
- Child agency: General Office
- Website: www.scopsr.gov.cn

Central Institutional Organization Commission
- Simplified Chinese: 中央机构编制委员会
Transcriptions
Standard Mandarin
- Hanyu Pinyin: Zhōngyāng Jīgòu Biānzhì Wěiyuánhuì

The Central Institutional Organization Commission, sometimes synonymous with the State Commission for Public Sector Reform, is an agency of the Central Committee of the Chinese Communist Party with full jurisdiction also over the State Council of China as well as lower and local government bodies. It is led by the Premier of the State Council and closely tied to the Organization Department of the Chinese Communist Party.

== History ==
During its history, the Commission changed name several times between the establishment of the People's Republic of China and the adoption of its current name and functions in 1991.

== Functions ==
The commission oversees institutional reforms and staffing structures of the CCP Center and the State Council. The commission's functions include making policy on administrative reform, central reorganization plans, personnel establishment, quotas, wages, and administrative regulations for State institutions. Its authority was enhanced after the Ministry of Personnel was abolished. There is also the State Commission Office for Public Sector Reform, which serves as its executive organ.

== Membership ==
Current membership:

Director

- Li Qiang, Premier of the State Council, Politburo Standing Committee member

Deputy Director

- Cai Qi, Politburo Standing Committee member, First-ranked Secretary of the Central Secretariat

Members

- Not yet publicly released

== See also ==
- State Council of the People's Republic of China
- Organization Department of the Chinese Communist Party
