= 8th Golden Eagle Awards =

Chinese TV awards ceremony in 1990

The 8th Golden Eagle Awards were held June to November 1, 1990, in Nanjing, Jiangsu province. Nominees and winners are listed below, winners are in bold.

== Best Television Series ==
This award was not presented.

- Hedge, Women and Dog /篱笆·女人和狗
- Shanghai Morning/上海的早晨
- Overseas Eternal Regret/海外遗恨

== Best Lead Actor in a Television Series ==
- **Yan Xiang for Shanghai Morning**

== Best Lead Actress in a Television Series ==
- **Zhou Jie for Overseas Eternal Regret**

== Best Supporting Actor in a Television Series ==
- **Qi Mengshi for Shanghai Morning**

== Best Supporting Actress in a Television Series ==
- **Li Yuanyuan for Shanghai Morning**
