= Pan Chengdong =

Chinese mathematician

- Born: 26 May 1934; Suzhou, Jiangsu, Republic of China
- Died: 27 December 1997 (aged 63); Jinan, Shandong, China
- Education: Peking University
- Scientific career
- Fields: Mathematics
- Workplaces: Shandong University
- Doctoral advisor: Min Sihe; Hua Luogeng
- Doctoral students: Wang Xiaoyun

Pan Chengdong (Chinese: 潘承洞; pinyin: Pān Chéngdòng; 26 May 1934 – 27 December 1997) was a Chinese mathematician who made numerous contributions to number theory, including progress on Goldbach's conjecture. He was vice president of Shandong University and took the role of president from 1986 to 1997.

Born in Suzhou, Jiangsu Province on 26 May 1934, he entered the Department of Mathematics and Mechanics of Peking University in 1952 and obtained a postgraduate degree in 1961 advised by Min Sihe, a student of Edward Charles Titchmarsh. He then went to work at the Department of Mathematics of Shandong University.

He was honored with an Academician of the Chinese Academy of Science in 1991.

Previously, Wang Yuan made progress toward Goldbach's Conjecture on the distribution of prime numbers. His result was that for any sufficiently large even number, that number is the sum of two numbers—one a product of at most two primes, the other a product of at most three primes. This case is denoted by (2,3). In 1962, Pan Chengdong also made progress in proving Goldbach's conjecture by proving the (1,5) case independently and the (1,4) case the following year with N.B. Barban and Wang Yuan.

Academic offices
Preceded by Deng Conghao	President of Shandong University; 1986–1997	Succeeded by Zeng Fanren
