= Yin Weimin =

Chinese politician

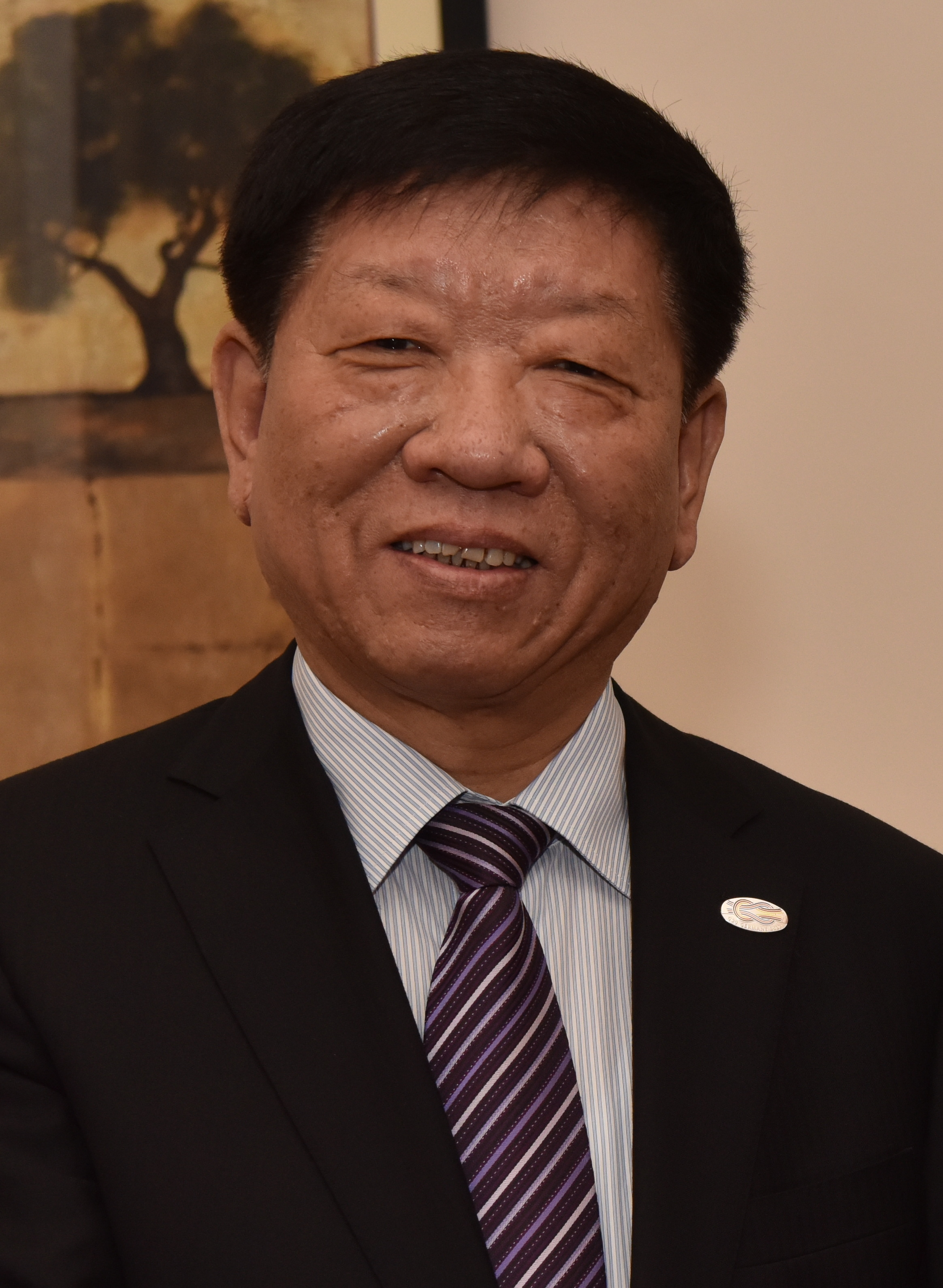
Yin in 2017

Yin Weimin (Chinese: 尹蔚民; pinyin: Yǐn Wèimín; born January 1953) was a Chinese politician who served as the Minister of Human Resources and Social Security and a deputy head of the Organization Department of the Chinese Communist Party.

== Biography ==
Born in Lingshou, Hebei Province, Yin joined the Chinese Communist Party (CCP) in 1973. He obtained a master's degree in economics from Jilin University. After serving in the Organization Department of the Central Committee of the Chinese Communist Party for many years, Yin was appointed vice Minister of Personnel in November 2000. He was elevated to vice Minister and vice Party chief in March 2005. On 30 August 2007, Yin was appointed Minister of Personnel.

In March 2008, according to the administrative reform scheme of the State Council, the Ministry of Personnel and the Ministry of Labor and Social Security merged to form the Ministry of Human Resources and Social Security. On 17 March, Yin was appointed as the first Minister of the new Ministry. On 19 March 2008, Yin was also made the Party chief of the Ministry and the director of the newly formed State Bureau of Civil Servants. He was also named as a deputy head of the Organization Department of the Chinese Communist Party.

Yin has been a member of the 17th and 18th Central Committees of the Chinese Communist Party.
