= Anhui University =

Provincial public university in Hefei, Anhui, China

Coordinates: 31°50′44″N 117°15′06″E

- 安徽大学
- Other names: 安大, āndà
- Motto: 至诚至坚，博学笃行 honest, resolute, erudite, discreet
- Established: 1928; 98 years ago
- President: Sun Changyin (孙长银)
- Academic staff: 1,522
- Administrative staff: 2,500
- Students: 49000
- Undergraduates: 34000
- Postgraduates: 15000
- Location: Hefei, Anhui, China
- Campus: 磬苑校区, 龙河校区 (2,143,116 m^{2} (214 ha; 530 acres)
- Website: www.ahu.edu.cn

Chinese name
- Simplified Chinese: 安徽大学
- Traditional Chinese: 安徽大學
Transcriptions
Standard Mandarin
- Hanyu Pinyin: Ānhuī Dàxué

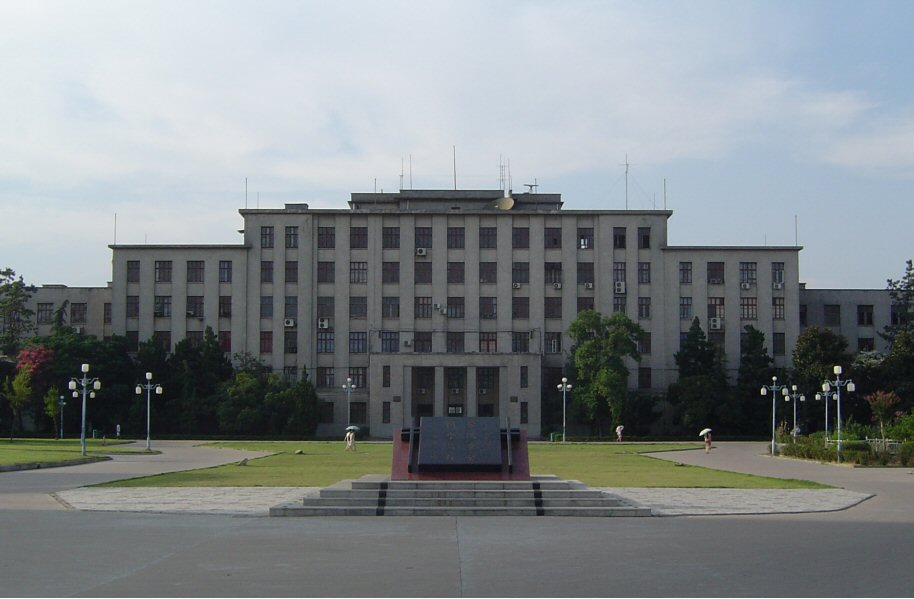
View of Anhui University's main campus from inside the South Gate.

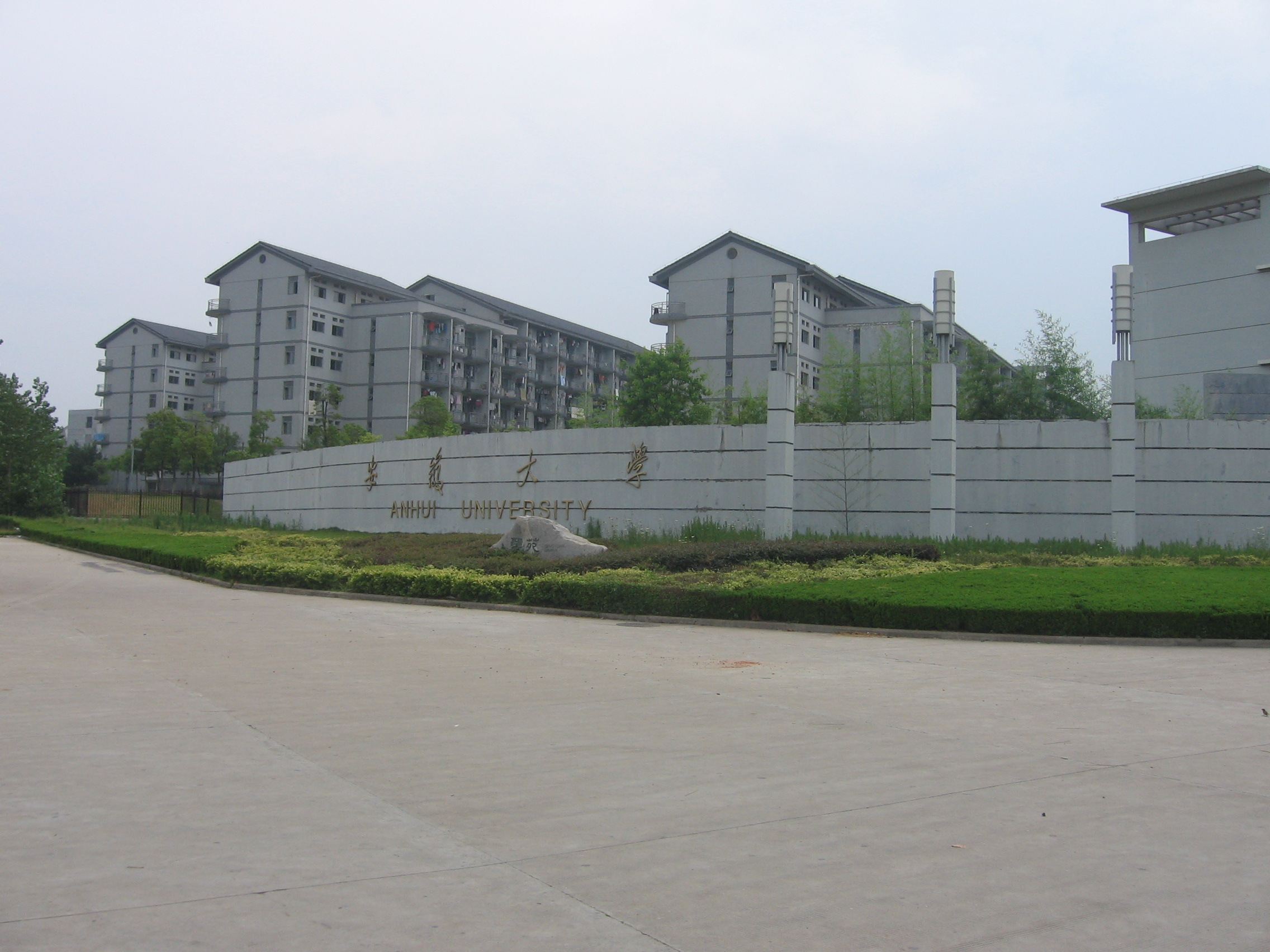
Qingyuan Campus

Anhui University (AHU) is provincial public university in Hefei, Anhui, China. It is affiliated with the Anhui Provincial Government, and co-funded by the Anhui Provincial Government, the Ministry of Education, and SASTIND. The university is part of the Double First-Class Construction and Project 211.

There are now more than 34,000 undergraduates and more than 15,000 doctoral and master's degree students; in recent years, the rate of undergraduate graduates going on to higher education has remained above 35% on average. It consists of 14 colleges, Anhui University's broad-based education covers philosophy, economics, law, literature, history, science, engineering and management.

== History ==
Anhui University was established in 1928 in Anqing and moved to Hefei in 1952 where it was split into Anhui Agricultural College and Anhui Normal University. In 1958 the Anhui provincial government rebuilt the university in Hefei. Anhui University is a higher education institution supported by the government under the State Double First Class University Plan and the former 211 Project.

== Campus ==
The university has four campuses. The main campus covers an area of 55 hectares (140 acres), two branch campuses are 30 hectares (74 acres) and the new campus is about 200 hectares (490 acres). The university consists of 18 schools, 44 departments, 65 undergraduate programs, 119 master's degree programs, 16 Ph.D. programs, one post-doctorate scientific research work station, two state-level disciplines and 12 provincial-level disciplines. The university has a staff of 2399 including 210 professors and 490 associate professors. The student population totals 28143 including 6466 mature students.

== Library ==
The university library has a collection of more than 1.75 million books and over 7000 Chinese and foreign periodicals. There are two libraries in both the main campus and the new campus.

== Department structure ==
The university currently has 33 schools and departments. It hosts 1 Double First-Class discipline, 2 national key disciplines, 14 provincial top disciplines, 4 provincial top disciplines under cultivation, and 25 provincial key disciplines. According to the Essential Science Indicators (ESI), 11 disciplines of the university — including Materials Science, Chemistry, Engineering, Computer Science, Mathematics, Environment/Ecology, Physics, Biology and Biochemistry, General Social Sciences, Clinical Medicine, and Earth Science — rank among the global top 1% (with 4 disciplines in the top 2%). In the 2024 Shanghai Ranking of Best Chinese Subjects, Computer Science and Technology, Chemistry, and Applied Economics were ranked within the national top 20.

The university has authorization to confer doctoral degrees in 23 first-level disciplines and professional categories, as well as master's degrees in 65 first-level disciplines and professional categories.

Since its founding, the university has trained more than 390,000 graduates across various fields, making it one of the largest and most influential institutions in Anhui Province in terms of graduate numbers and distribution. Currently, it has approximately 34,000 full-time undergraduates, 15,000 master's and doctoral students, and around 500 international students.

=== World-class construction disciplines ===
- Materials Science and Engineering

=== State Key Disciplines ===
- Chinese Language & Graphonomy
- Computer Application Technology

=== Provincial Key Disciplines ===
- Basic Mathematics and Probability Statistics
- Material Physics
- Inorganic Chemistry
- Circuit and Systems
- Foreign Philosophy
- Political Economics
- Economics Law
- Ancient Chinese Literature
- English Linguistics
- Theoretical Physics
- Computer Applications
- Magnetic and Microwave Technology
- Information Management and Information Systems
- Arts and Design
- Music

=== Research Institution for Human & Social Sciences under the Ministry of Education ===
- Huizhou Studies

=== Key labs under the Ministry of Education ===
- Intelligent Computing and Signal Processing

== International exchange ==
The university participates in international exchange programs. It has agreements with 74 overseas universities. The university has accepted foreign students since 1980. It is approved by the Ministry of Education to enroll international students who have received Chinese government's scholarships. It was designated by Overseas Chinese Affairs Office under the State Council as the Teaching Base for Chinese Language and Culture in 2000. To date more than 700 international students from Asia, America and Europe have been admitted to study at the university.

== See also ==
- List of universities and colleges in Anhui
- List of universities in China
