= Zhang Rong (physicist) =

Chinese physicist (born 1964)

Zhang Rong (Chinese: 张荣; pinyin: Zhāng Róng; born February 1964 in Huai'an) is a Chinese physicist who has worked in the area of wide band‐gap semiconductor materials and devices. He has been President of Shandong University since October 2013. Zhang joined the Department of Physics, Nanjing University as a student in September 1979 and became a member of the faculty in July 1986 and was promoted to professor in March 1995. During the period from 1995 to 1999, he was a visiting scientist at the University of Wisconsin–Madison and the University of Maryland. He received a named professorship ("Cheung Kong Scholar's Program") from the Ministry of Education in 2000. He became assistant to the president of Nanjing University in February 2002, and was appointed to the standing committee of the university as a vice president in November 2006. In April 2010, he was reappointed to the standing committee and promoted to Executive Vice President of Nanjing University. In October 2013, he became President of Shandong University (at a rank equivalent to a vice-minister).

Party political offices
Preceded by Zhang Yan	Secretary of the CCP Committee of Xiamen University; April 2022－	Incumbent
Academic offices
Preceded by Xu Xianming	President of Shandong University; 2013–2017	Succeeded by Fan Liming
Preceded by Zhu Chongshi	President of Xiamen University; July 2017 - April 2022	Succeeded by Zhang Zongyi
