= Li Yuanyuan (engineer) =

Chinese engineer and university administrator

- 李元元

Communist Party Secretary of Huazhong University of Science and Technology
- Incumbent
- Assumed office 20 October 2021
- Preceded by: Shao Xinyu

President of Huazhong University of Science and Technology
- In office 1 November 2018 – 20 October 2021
- Preceded by: Ding Lieyun
- Succeeded by: You Zheng

President of Jilin University
- In office September 2011 – October 2018
- Preceded by: Zhan Tao
- Succeeded by: Zhang Xi

President of South China University of Technology
- In office September 2003 – December 2011
- Preceded by: Liu Huanbin
- Succeeded by: Wang Yingjun

Personal details
- Born: 3 October 1958 (age 68) Mei County, Guangdong, China
- Party: Chinese Communist Party
- Education: Hunan University; South China University of Technology
- Scientific career
- Fields: Powder metallurgy and casting
- Workplaces: Huazhong University of Science and Technology

Li Yuanyuan (born 3 October 1958) is a Chinese engineer who is an academician of the Chinese Academy of Engineering, former president of South China University of Technology, Jilin University and Huazhong University of Science and Technology, and currently party secretary of Huazhong University of Science and Technology.

He was a delegate to the 9th and 12th National People's Congress.

== Biography ==
Li was born in Mei County (now Meixian District of Meizhou), Guangdong, on 3 October 1958. In October 1973, he became a sent-down youth during the Down to the Countryside Movement. In 1978, he attended Hunan University, graduating in 1982 with a bachelor's degree in foundry science. He also received his master's degree in foundry science in 1987 and doctor's degree in machine manufacturing in 1998 at South China University of Technology.

After graduating in June 1982, he taught at his alma mater's Mechanical Department, and moved to South China University of Technology in June 1987, what he was promoted to associate professor in January 1992 and to full professor in December 1993. From February to May 1997, he was a visiting scholar at Technische Universität Berlin. In December 1998, he became vice president of South China University of Technology, rising to president in September 2003. He was president of Jilin University from September 2011 to October 2018, a position at vice-ministerial level. In May 2012, he was admitted to member of the standing committee of the Chinese Communist Party's Jilin Provincial Committee, the province's top authority. He took office as present of Huazhong University of Science and Technology in October 2018, and was promoted to CCP committee secretary, the top political position in the university, in October 2021.

== Honours and awards ==
- 2013 Member of the Chinese Academy of Engineering (CAE)

Educational offices
Preceded by Liu Huanbin	President of South China University of Technology; 2003–2011	Succeeded by Wang Yingjun
Preceded by Zhan Tao	President of Jilin University; 2011–2018	Succeeded by Zhang Xi
Preceded by Ding Lieyun	President of Huazhong University of Science and Technology; 2018–2021	Succeeded by You Zheng
Party political offices
Preceded by Shao Xinyu	Communist Party Secretary of Huazhong University of Science and Technology; 2021–present	Incumbent
