= Chaohu University =

University in Chaohu, China

Chaohu University (Chinese: 巢湖学院; lit. 'Chaohu College') is a provincial public applied science college located in Chaohu, Anhui, China. It was originally established as Chaohu Teachers Vocational School in 1983 and upgraded to a college in 2002. The college received accreditation to award bachelor's degrees in 2006. It is affiliated with the Anhui Provincial Government.

As of December 2022, the campus spans an area of 1,324.5 acres, with a total constructed area of 395,000 square meters. The value of its teaching and scientific research equipment totals 185 million yuan. The institute houses a collection of approximately 3.5979 million volumes of books and literature resources, which includes over 1,165,200 volumes of print literature. It comprises 15 secondary colleges that offer 59 undergraduate majors. The faculty consists of 1,019 members, and there are 17,032 full-time students enrolled.
