= Guo Yipin =

Chinese politician

- 郭宜品

Vice-Mayor of Luoyang
- In office February 2014 – 7 October 2014
- Mayor: Li Liushen (李柳身)

Communist Party Secretary of Yichuan County
- In office March 2009 – February 2014
- Preceded by: Lou Huifeng
- Succeeded by: Hou Zhanguo

County Governor of Yichuan County
- In office December 2007 – March 2009
- Preceded by: Gong Xiaoping
- Succeeded by: Hou Zhanguo

Personal details
- Born: September 1962 (age 64) Luoning County, Henan, China
- Party: Chinese Communist Party
- Education: Henan Agricultural University

Guo Yipin (Chinese: 郭宜品; pinyin: Guō Yípǐn; born September 1962) is a Chinese politician from Henan Province, serving as the Vice-Mayor of Luoyang since February 2014. He was previously the County Governor and Communist Party Secretary of Yichuan County.

Guo disappeared from public view in July 2014 but was located and arrested by police in Changsha several months later. Guo was a luoguan; i.e., his children and wife reside abroad while he works in China.

== Career ==
Guo was born and raised in Luoning County, Henan. He graduated from Henan Agricultural University in 1986, majoring in economic management in agriculture.

He became involved in politics in September 1982 and joined the Chinese Communist Party in June 1983.

Beginning in 1981, he served in several posts in Luoning County, including Secretary of the Communist Youth League in Luoning.

In March 1998 he was transferred to Luanchuan County as Vice County Governor, and served until March 2003. Then he served as a Standing Committee member and the Minister of Organization Department of Luanchuan County. In July 2005, he was appointed the Chinese Communist Party Deputy Committee Secretary, he remained in that position until November 2007, when he was transferred to Yichuan County and appointed the County Governor and Deputy Party Secretary. In March 2009, he was elevated to the Party Secretary of Yichuan County.

In February 2014, Guo was promoted to become the Vice-Mayor of Luoyang.

In late July 2014, Guo asked for time off to "take his mother for medical treatment" in Beijing. He was last seen on July 31 participating in a local flood prevention program in Luoyang. He could no longer be reached a few days later. On September 15, 2014, Chinese media reported that he was missing and his wife and children have emigrated to a foreign country. Police began investigating Guo's case on September 16.

Guo was found by police in an apartment near a pottery market in Changsha on October 6, 2014. He was paying rent of 800 yuan (~$135) a month for his apartment, cooked his own meals, watched the news twice a day, and did not go outside very often. He told his landlord that he was in Changsha accompanying his child, who he claimed was going to school in the city.

On August 30, 2017, he was eventually sentenced to 14 years in jail.

Government offices
Preceded by Gong Xiaoping	County Governor of Yichuan County; 2007–2009	Succeeded by Hou Zhanguo
Party political offices
Preceded by Lou Huifeng	Communist Party Secretary of Yichuan County; 2009–2014	Succeeded by Hou Zhanguo
