= West Anhui University =

University in Lu'an, China

Coordinates: 31.762°N 116.477°E

- 皖西学院
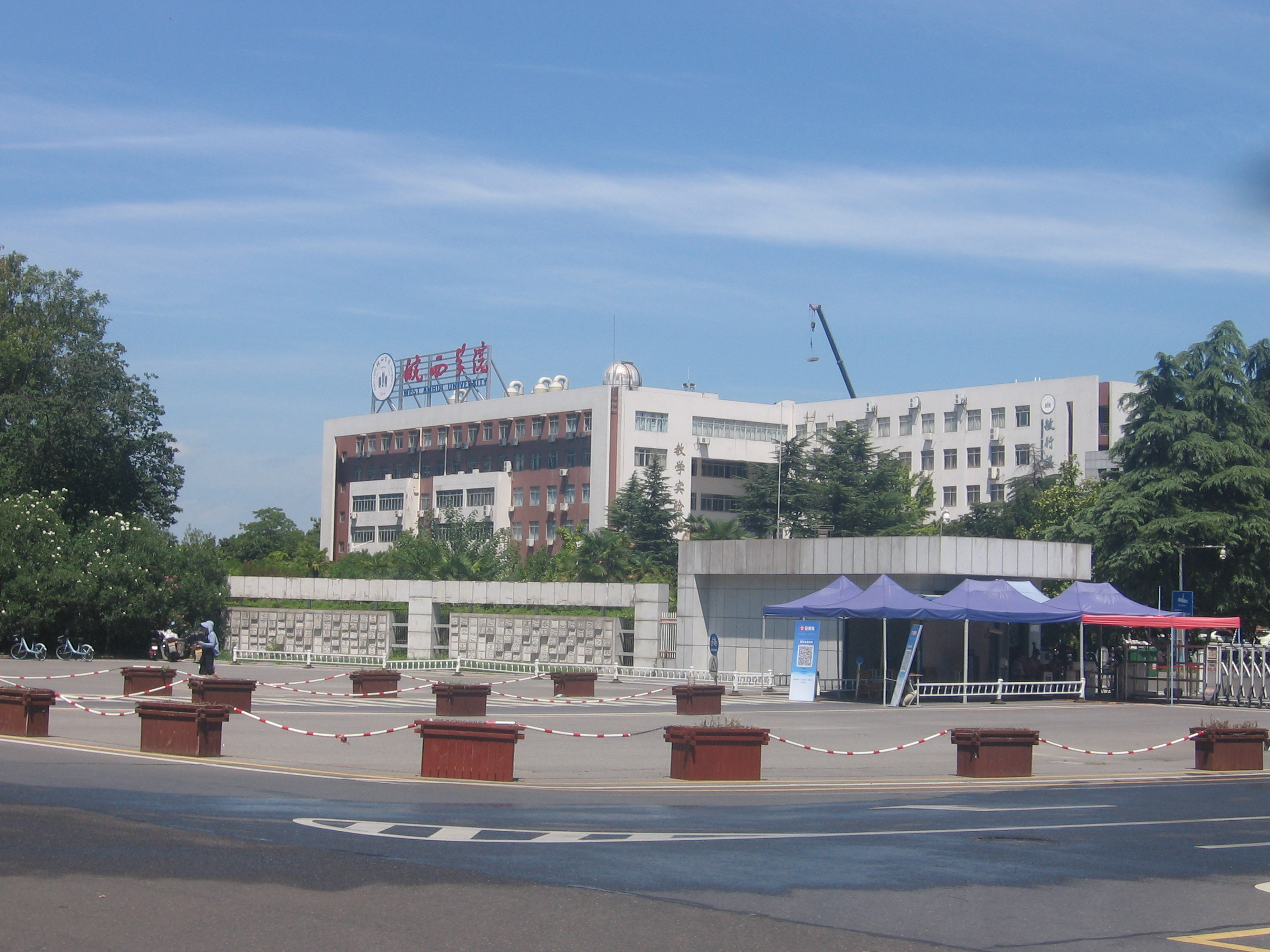
- Motto: 厚德尚能 博学创新
- Type: Public
- Established: 1918
- Affiliations: Anhui Provincial Government
- President: Xiao Xin (肖新)
- Academic staff: 1005
- Administrative staff: 1307
- Students: 17300
- Location: Lu'an, Anhui, China
- Campus: 290 acres (120 ha); Urban
- Website: https://www.wxc.edu.cn/

West Anhui University (Chinese: 皖西学院; pinyin: Wǎnxī Xuéyuàn; abbr: WAU) is a provincial public university in Lu'an, Anhui, China. It is affiliated and funded by the Anhui Provincial Government. It is a master's degree awarding institution, a local applied high-level university construction unit in Anhui Province, and an applied characteristic university construction unit in Anhui Province.

The university's campus covers 1,765 mu (approximately 1,765 mu) and has a total construction area of 528,000 square meters. It offers 15 secondary colleges and 65 undergraduate programs, including two national first-class program development sites, two national specialty programs, one national pilot program for comprehensive professional reform, 14 provincial first-class programs, and 18 provincial "Six Excellence and One Elite" programs. The university has nearly 1,300 faculty and staff members and over 17,300 full-time students.

== History ==
Lu'an Normal School: founded in 1951, formerly known as the Anhui Third Class of Agricultural School which was constructed by the former vice chairman of the National People's Congress and former chairman of the Central Committee of the Democratic Revolution Mr. Zhu Yunshan. In 1999 the school was included in the Lu'an Normal College.

Lu'an Normal College: founded in August 1958, the college site was located in the west bank of the Pihe River Taohua Dock in Lu'an. In September 1963, the college changed its name as Lu'an Middle School Teacher Further Education School, and changed again as the Lu'an area teacher training course, later the West Anhui Normal University between 1970 and 1975. After restoring the National College Entrance Examination in 1977, the name of it was changed as Anhui Normal University Lu'an Teaching Point. In January 1979, it was restored as Lu'an Normal College after approval by the State Council.

West Anhui Union University: founded in autumn 1985. It had three majors: accounting statistics, industrial civil buildings and freshwater aquaculture.

West Anhui University: in March 2000, the Ministry of Education merged these three schools and set up the West Anhui University.

== Administration ==
=== Colleges ===
- College of Materials and Chemical Engineering
- College of Electrical and Optoelectronic Engineering
- College of Electronic and Information Engineering
- College of Law
- College of Environment and Tourism
- College of Mechanical and Vehicle Engineering
- College of Architecture and Civil Engineering
- College of Finance and Mathematics
- College of Economics and Management
- College of Biological and Pharmaceutical Engineering
- College of Physical Education
- College of Foreign Language
- College of Culture and Media
- College of Art
- College of Marxism

=== Disciplines ===
The university has more than 60 disciplines, with 2 national special disciplines, 1 national "discipline comprehensive reform" pilot discipline and 1 provincial key discipline.
