= Li Xiaoxin =

Chinese politician

- 李小新

Director of the State Commission Office for Public Sector Reform
- Incumbent
- Assumed office April 2022
- Preceded by: Zhou Zuyi

Personal details
- Born: October 1962 (age 63–64) Yueyang, Hunan, China
- Party: Chinese Communist Party (CCP)
- Education: Hunan Agricultural University

Li Xiaoxin (Chinese: 李小新; pinyin: Lǐ Xiǎoxīn; born October 1962) is a Chinese politician, currently serving as deputy head of the Organization Department of the Chinese Communist Party and director of the State Commission Office for Public Sector Reform.

Li is a representative of the 20th National Congress of the Chinese Communist Party and a member of the 20th Central Committee of the Chinese Communist Party.

== Biography ==
Li was born in Yueyang, Hunan, in October 1962. After graduating from Hunan Agricultural University in 1983, she successively worked in the government of Miluo County (now Miluo) and the Organization Department of the CCP Hunan Provincial Committee.

Li was assigned to the Organization Department of the Chinese Communist Party in October 2002, where she eventually becoming deputy head in August 2020. In April 2022, she was appointed director of the State Commission Office for Public Sector Reform, succeeding Zhou Zuyi.

Party political offices
Preceded by Zhou Zuyi	Director of the State Commission Office for Public Sector Reform; 2022–	Incumbent
