= Ministry of Human Resources and Social Security =

Chinese central government department

- 中华人民共和国人力资源和社会保障部
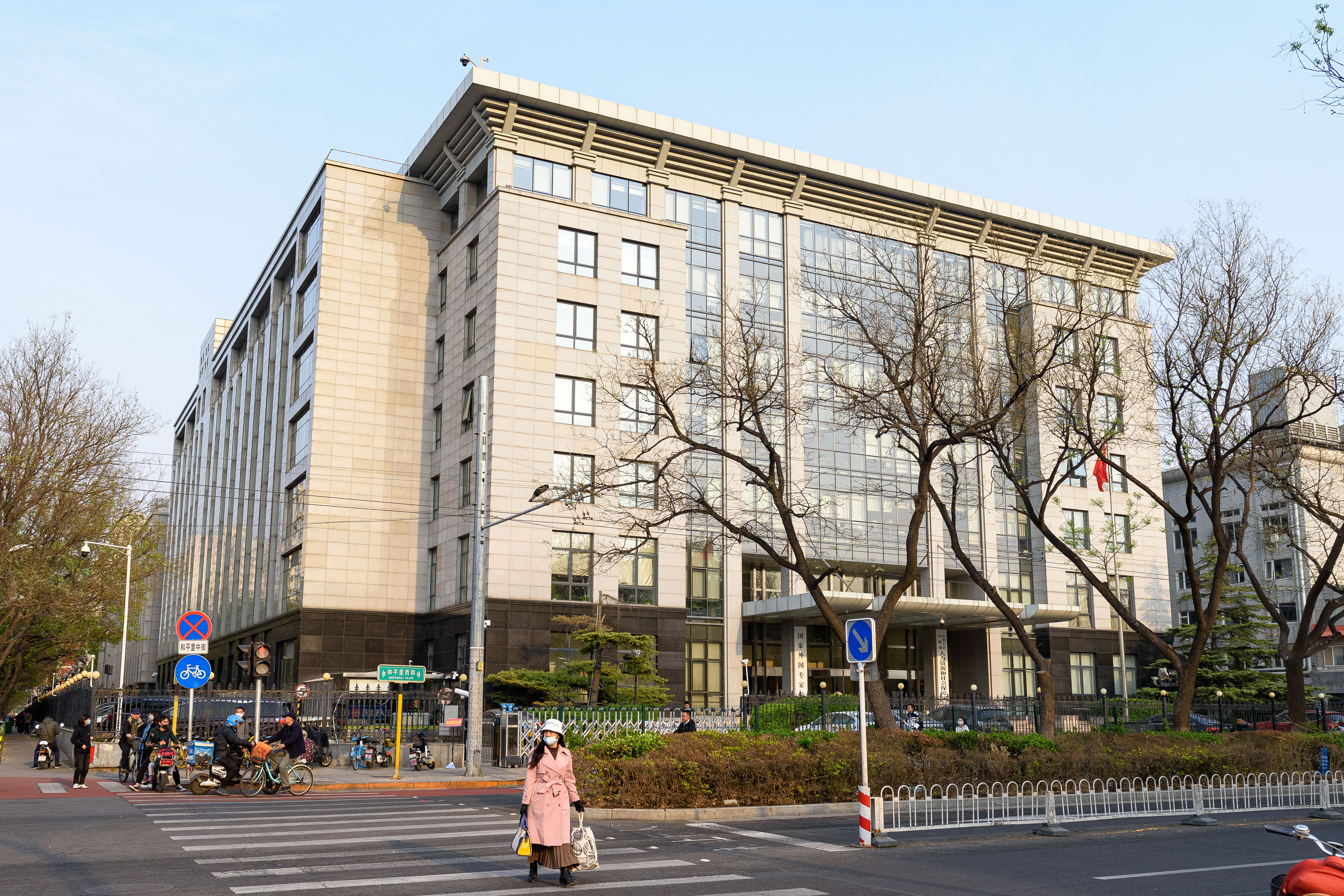
- Ministry headquarters in Dongcheng

Agency overview
- Formed: 1949; 77 years ago 2008; 18 years ago (current form)
- Preceding agencies: Ministry of Labor and Social Security; Ministry of Personnel
- Jurisdiction: Government of China
- Headquarters: Beijing
- Motto: People's livelihood as origin, skilled talents first
- Minister responsible: Wang Xiaoping, Minister
- Deputy Ministers responsible: Wang Shaofeng; Wu Xiuzhang; Li Zhong; Yu Jiadong
- Agency executive: Zhang Min, Leader of Discipline Inspection & Supervision Team
- Parent agency: State Council of China
- Website: www.mohrss.gov.cn

The Ministry of Human Resources and Social Security (MOHRSS) is a ministry under the State Council of the People's Republic of China responsible for national labor policies, standards, regulations and managing the national social security system. This includes labor force management, labor relationship readjustment, social insurance management and legal construction of labor. The State Bureau of Civil Servants reports to the new ministry.

== Responsibilities ==
The Ministry of Human Resources and Social Security (MOHRSS) formulates development plans for human resources and social security policies, promotes employment, creates income policies for personnel in institutions, and develops a multi-level social security system for urban areas and rural areas.

The MOHRSS has responsibility for managing the employment market in mainland China. The ministry also oversees the China Overseas Talent Network, part of the Thousand Talents Plan, and has internal bureaus focused on technology transfer.

== History ==
In October 1949, the Central People's Government established the Bureau of Personnel of the State Council and the Ministry of Labor of the Central People's Government. In 1950, the Ministry of Personnel of the Central People's Government was established, with An Ziwen as its first minister. In 1954, the Ministry of Personnel of the Central People's Government was abolished and the Bureau of Personnel of the State Council was set up. In 1959, the Bureau of Personnel of the State Council was abolished and the Bureau of Personnel of Government Offices of the Ministry of the Interior was set up as an internal organization within the Ministry of Interior Affairs.

During the Cultural Revolution, the Ministry of Internal Affairs of the People's Republic of China was abolished, and the work related to personnel was transferred to the Organization Department of the Chinese Communist Party for handling. In March 1978, the State Council established the Personnel Bureau of Government Offices of the Ministry of Civil Affairs. In 1980, the State Council decided to merge the bureau and the Office of the Military Cadre Reassignment Working Group of the State Council to establish the State Personnel Bureau, an organization directly under the State Council.

In May 1982, the State Administration of Labor, the State Personnel Bureau, the State Editorial Office and the Bureau of Scientific and Technological Cadres of the State Council were merged to form the Ministry of Labor and Personnel, and Zhao Shouyi was appointed as the minister. In 1988, according to the Institutional Reform Program of the State Council, the Ministry of Personnel of China and the Ministry of Labor of China were set up after separating the labor and personnel, and filling up the other functions, respectively, and the Bureau of Scientific and Technological Cadres of the former State Science and Technology Commission of China was merged into the Ministry of Personnel to adapt to the separation of party and government and the reform of the cadre and personnel system.

The current ministry was created from the merger of the then Ministry of Personnel and the then Ministry of Labor and Social Security, announced at the 2008 National People's Congress.

Due to the 2008 financial crisis and the Great Recession, the department recommended companies to prevent and control large staff reduction. In July 2022, MOHRSS and nine other central ministries launched an occupational injury insurance program for platform economy workers. Through the pilot program, platform companies in specified cities and provinces were required to purchase occupational injury insurance for their workers.

Since December 30, 2022, the ministry is headed by Wang Xiaoping. On February 21, 2023, MOHRSS issued a notice addressing contracts for new forms of employment, including through the platform economy. The notice emphasized the importance of platform companies signing contracts with workers and provided template contracts to be used in work situations that are short of employer-employee relationships. On March 11, 2023, as part of the plan on reforming Party and state institutions, the Ministry of Science and Technology's responsibility for the introduction of foreign intelligence (State Administration of Foreign Experts Affairs) were transferred to the Ministry of Human Resources and Social Security.

The Ministry of Human Resources and Social Security (MOHRSS) Department of Pensions and Rural Social Insurance has general supervision over pension programs.

== See also ==
- Labor Contract Law of the People's Republic of China
- Ministries of the People's Republic of China
- Social welfare in China
- China Accreditation Test for Translators and Interpreters
