= Organization Department of the Chinese Communist Party =

Human resources management department

Organization Department of the Central Committee of the Chinese Communist Party
- 中国共产党中央委员会组织部
- Emblem of the Chinese Communist Party

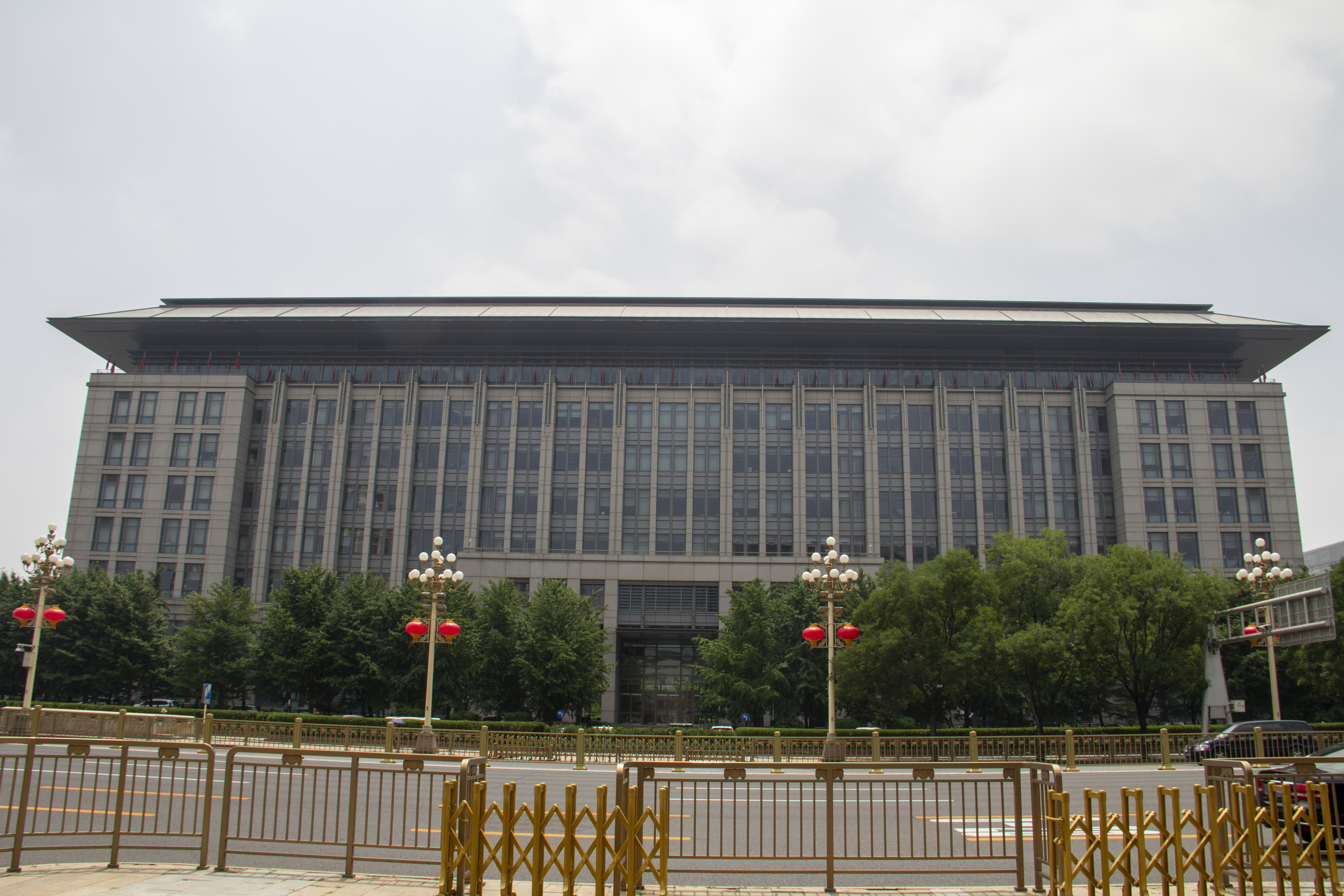
- Headquarters of the CCP Organization Department

Agency overview
- Formed: July 1921; 105 years ago
- Type: Department directly reporting to the Central Committee; Ministerial level agency
- Jurisdiction: Chinese Communist Party
- Headquarters: 80 West Chang'an Avenue, Xicheng District, Beijing, China
- Minister responsible: Shi Taifeng, Head
- Deputy Ministers responsible: Huang Jianfa, Executive Deputy Head; Li Xiaoxin*, Deputy Head; Zhang Guangjun, Deputy Head; Qi Jiabin, Deputy Head; Wu Hao, Deputy Head
- Parent agency: Central Committee of the Chinese Communist Party
- Website: news.12371.cn/dzybmbdj/zzb/

Footnotes
- * Maintains full minister-level rank

Organization Department of the Chinese Communist Party
- Simplified Chinese: 中国共产党中央委员会组织部
- Traditional Chinese: 中國共產黨中央委員會組織部
Transcriptions
Standard Mandarin
- Hanyu Pinyin: Zhōngguó Gòngchǎndǎng Zhōngyāng Wěiyuánhuì Zǔzhībù

Abbreviation
- Simplified Chinese: 中共中央组织部
- Traditional Chinese: 中共中央組織部
Transcriptions
Standard Mandarin
- Hanyu Pinyin: Zhōnggòng Zhōngyāng Zǔzhībù

The Organization Department of the Central Committee of the Chinese Communist Party is the human resource management department of the Central Committee of the Chinese Communist Party (CCP) that controls staffing positions within the CCP.

The Organization Department is one of the most important organs of the CCP. It forms the institutional heart of the Leninist party system. It controls party personnel assignments throughout the national system, and compiles detailed and confidential reports on future potential leaders of the CCP. The department is known for its highly secretive nature; state media outlet China News Service stated it "always wears a mysterious veil" and historically interacted little with the public or press.

Because the People's Republic of China (PRC) is a one-party state, the CCP Organization Department has an enormous amount of control over state personnel. The Organization Department is indispensable to the CCP's power, and the key to its hold over personnel throughout every level of government and industry. It is one of the key agencies of the Central Committee, along with the Central Propaganda Department, United Front Work Department and International Department.

== History ==
In May 1924, the Central Committee of the Chinese Communist Party officially decided to establish the Organization Department, with Mao Zedong as its head. The 4th National Party Congress's Resolution on Organizational Issues said that "establishing a powerful Central Organization Department can actually guide the local party organizations".

On 20 March 1943, the CCP Politburo passed the Decision of the CCP Central Committee on the Adjustment and Streamlining of Central Institutions, which stipulated that all major political, ideological, military, policy and organizational issues must be discussed and approved at the Politburo meeting. Under the Politburo and the Secretariat, the Propaganda Committee and the Organization Committee were established as assistant organs of the Politburo and Secretariat. Mao Zedong served as secretary of the Propaganda Committee while Liu Shaoqi served as secretary of the Organization Committee. The Organization Committee was responsible for the unified management of the Central Organization Department (including the Central Party Affairs Committee), the United Front Work Department, the Mass Movement Work Committee, the Central Research Bureau, and the Overseas Work Committee. The Organization Committee was now the Central Party Building Work Leading Group.

In 1953, the Central Committee decided to implement a "system of cadres managed by different departments" and a "system of cadres managed at different levels," changing the previous system where all types of cadres were uniformly managed by the Party's organization departments. All cadres were divided into nine categories, and under the unified management of the Party Central Committee and the organization departments of Party committees at all levels, they were managed separately by the various departments of the Party Central Committee and Party committees at all levels (such as the Ministry of Planning and Industry, the Ministry of Finance and Trade, the Ministry of Rural Work, the Propaganda Department, the United Front Work Department, and the Political Work Department). The Central People's Government Council and its various ministries, as well as local governments at all levels, also established personnel departments to assist the Party's organization departments in the comprehensive management of cadre work in government agencies, enterprises, and institutions, and to manage a portion of cadres under the leadership of the Party committees and Party groups according to their cadre management authority. In 1955, the Central Committee promulgated the List of Cadre Positions Managed by the Central Committee of the Chinese Communist Party, placing all cadres at the prefectural and departmental levels and above under the direct management of the Organization Department of the Central Committee, who were then referred to as "Central-managed cadres."

In 1980, the Organization Department issued a special document emphasizing the need to correctly adhere to the "principle of the Party's management of cadres," and stipulated the scope and system for cadre management by Party committees at all levels. It required that the appointment, removal, promotion, transfer, review, and handling of cadre issues must be decided collectively by the Party committee and approved by the competent Party organization according to the cadre management authority; no individual could act arbitrarily. In 1984, to adapt to the needs of economic system reform and in accordance with the spirit of the Central Committee's instructions on reforming the cadre management system, the Organization Department, adhering to the principles of "less management, better management, and more flexible management," delegated cadre management authority, deciding that the scope of cadre management by Party committees at all levels (excluding the military) would be adjusted from "managing two levels below" to "managing one level below."

In addition to the Notice on Revising the List of Titles of Cadres Managed by the CCP Central Committee issued by the Organization Department in 1990, which stated that "the appointment and removal of the heads and deputy heads of the organization departments of the Party committees of provinces, autonomous regions and municipalities directly under the Central Government, and the heads and deputy heads of the cadre and personnel departments (bureaus) of the ministries and commissions of the Central and State organs shall still be carried out in accordance with the provisions of Document No. 4 of the CCP Central Committee [1986], and the consent of the Organization Department of the CCP Central Committee must be obtained in advance," the notice also added that the appointment and removal of the Party secretaries and mayors of 14 sub-provincial cities, including Shenyang, as well as the Party secretaries of 54 enterprises and institutions, including China First Automobile Works, Peking University, and the Chinese Academy of Agricultural Sciences, which were transferred to the State Council for management in September 1988, must also be subject to the consent of the Organization Department of the CPC Central Committee in advance.

On August 5, 2003, with the approval of the CCP Central Committee and the State Council, the China Pudong Cadre Academy, the China Jinggangshan Cadre Academy, and the China Yan'an Cadre Academy were established. The three academies are directly under the central government and are managed by the Organization Department. Their daily affairs are handled by the Party committees of the provinces (municipalities) where the academies are located. The academies implement a system of responsibility for the academy affairs committee under the leadership of the board of directors. The secretariat of the board of directors is located in the Cadre Education Bureau of the Organization Department.

In the early 2000s, the Organization Department introduced an evaluation procedure for leading officials (the cadre system) that aimed to assess regularly the officials' performance and success at implementing policies. David Shambaugh notes the promulgation of Regulations on the Selection and Appointment of Party and Government Leading Cadres in July 2002, writing that the Organization Department has stepped up its evaluation of cadres, including annual appraisal reviews according to various criteria. However, research conducted by Thomas Heberer in China in 2007 revealed that an effective evaluation procedure is not yet in place. Crucial policy areas, such as environmental issues, are not being evaluated, and evaluation is predominantly based on self-assessment.

In 2018, as part of the deepening the reform of the Party and state institutions, it absorbed the former State Civil Servants Bureau. The rationale for the change was that it would better enforce the principle of "the Party controls the cadres."

== Functions ==
The Organization Department is in charge of selecting, promoting and training CCP officials and civil servants. The CCP uses the nomenklatura method ("list of names" in Soviet terminology) to determine appointments. The nomenklatura system is how a Leninist ruling party staffs the state, exercising organizational hegemony over appointments and dominating the political life of the country. The central nomenklatura list comprises the top 5,000 positions in the party-state, all of which are controlled by the Organization Department. This includes all ministerial and vice-ministerial positions, provincial governorships and First Party secretary appointments, as well as appointments of university chancellors, presidents of the Chinese Academy of Sciences and Chinese Academy of Social Sciences, etc. For senior positions, the Organization Department recommends candidates to the Standing Committee, which generally approves them. The Organization Department controls the appointment and removal of top management of the country's state-owned enterprises.

Related to the nomenklatura list is the bianzhi (Chinese: 编制) list, which is a list of the authorized number of personnel, as well as their duties and functions in government administrative organs, state enterprises, and service organizations. The bianzhi covers those employed in these organizations, whereas the nomenklatura applies to leadership positions. However, because the CCP and its organizational departments are constantly intervening in the personnel and administrative functioning of state institutions, the parallel existence of the bianzhi and nomenklatura systems has become an obstacle to fundamental administrative reform in the PRC.

An equivalent of the Organization Department in the United States, according to The Times, would "oversee the appointments of US state governors and their deputies; the mayors of big cities; heads of federal regulatory agencies; the chief executives of General Electric, ExxonMobil, Walmart and 50-odd of the remaining largest companies; justices on the Supreme Court; the editors of The New York Times, The Wall Street Journal and The Washington Post, the bosses of the television networks and cable stations, the presidents of Yale and Harvard and other big universities and the heads of think-tanks such as the Brookings Institution and The Heritage Foundation." While the system is from the Soviet Union, "the CPC has taken it to an extreme," Yuan Weishi of Sun Yat-sen University in Guangdong is quoted as saying by the Financial Times. "China is more radical. [The party here] wants to lead everything."

Bruce Gilley and Andrew J. Nathan write that in the promotion of individual candidates for high positions, a good rating from the Organization Department is essential. The department judges on such qualities as "ideological probity, loyalty to the Party, attitude toward work, and ability to mobilize others." Its research on individuals slated for top positions are "probing" and assessments often acute.

Internal CCP documents give frank assessments of the Organization Department's strategy to enhance its control. Before the 16th National Congress of the Chinese Communist Party, a set of Temporary Regulations were amended to encourage the appointment of cadres that explicitly supported Jiang Zemin's theory of Three Represents. Jiang's closest ally in the central government, Zeng Qinghong, who headed the Central Organization Department at the time, gave a presentation at a special training session for organization and personnel cadres before the official release of the 2002 regulations. He asserted that "the work of amending the 'temporary regulations' consists in building a stronger thought, organization, and work style within the whole Party according to the requirements of the 'Three Represents'".

=== Efforts against corruption ===
The Central Organization Department played a leading role in the cadre reform drive from 2005 to 2006. In June 1999, the department made efforts to prevent provincial leaders from working in their native provinces in an attempt to prevent corruption.

Senior CCP leaders often carry influence in the determination of key positions. The children of Li Peng, for example, came to hold powerful jobs in the power sector where he had ruled; while Zhu Rongji oversaw the finance sector, his son became the highly paid head of China International Capital Corporation, the country's largest investment bank; and Jiang Zemin replaced others when he was the CCP official in charge of technology, putting loyalists into top jobs, and his son into a key position.

According to a 2009 report, the buying and selling of official positions also takes place, particularly in small localities, where head of the local Organization Department is among the most sought after positions. The job carries great discretionary power, allowing the wielder the ability to grant jobs to other individuals in return for cash. At lower levels, the practice has been characterized by bribery, corruption, treachery, and "sheer desperate self-interest," according to the Financial Times, which examined internal documents produced by the Organization Department in Jilin.

=== Other activities ===
The local and provincial levels of the Organization Department administer examinations for the assigned graduates system (xuandiaosheng, 选调生), which is an alternative path to civil service in China separate and distinct from the civil service examination. The examinations cover public service topics similar to those in the civil service examination, but are generally viewed as less competitive. Through the assigned graduates system, new university graduates who are student cadres and at least probationary CCP members enter a program that sends them to grassroots positions like village leadership roles or local Communist Youth League secretaries for a few years.

== Organization ==
The CCP Organization Department has the following institutions:

=== Internal organization ===
- General Office
- Bureau I
- Bureau II (Grassroots Party Organization Construction Office)
- Cadre Supervision Bureau
- Cadre Education Bureau
- Cadre Allocation Bureau (First Bureau)
- Party and Government and Foreign Affairs Cadre Bureau (Second Bureau)
- Economic and Technological Education Cadre Bureau (Third Bureau)
- Central and State Organs Cadres Bureau (Fourth Bureau)
- Enterprise Cadre Bureau (Fifth Bureau)
- Veteran Cadres Bureau
- Talent Work Bureau
- Civil Service Bureau
- Civil Service Bureau II
- Civil Service Bureau III
- Personnel Bureau
- Directly affiliated agencies administration
- Party Committee

=== Directly-affiliated institutions ===
- Party Building Research Institute
- Government Guest House (Wanshouzhuang Hotel)
- Party Member Education Center
- National School for Organizational Cadres

=== Directly-affiliated enterprises ===
- Party Building Books Publishing House

== See also ==
- Cadre Affairs Department of the Central Committee of the SED
