= Weiguo =

Weiguo
Traditional	偉國	緯國	衛國
Simplified	伟国	纬国	卫国
Mandarin Pinyin	Wěiguó		Wèiguó
Cantonese Yale	Wáihgwok		Waihgwok
Minnan POJ	Uíkok	Uīkok	Uēkok
Meaning	Great nation	Latitude of the nation	Defend the nation

Weiguo is the Mandarin Pinyin spelling of three Chinese masculine given names (see table). These names are also spelled Wei-kuo in Mandarin Wade-Giles (used in Taiwan), Wai-kwok in typical Hong Kong Cantonese spelling, or Wee-kok in Minnan pronunciation.

== Meaning ==
These names are popular patriotic names (the second character means "country" or "nation"). In the year of Singapore's independence, many proud parents named their children Weiguo, resulting in confusion for them later in life because so many shared the same name. The name "latitude of the nation" (緯國), paired with a brother named "longitude of the nation" (經國), is an allusion to the classical Chinese phrase jīngbāng wěiguó (經邦緯國), literally meaning "(to draw) the longitude and latitude of the nation", and metaphorically meaning a person who rules over a nation. Chiang Kai-shek's chosen names for his sons Chiang Wei-kuo and Chiang Ching-kuo are an example of this allusion.

== People ==
People with these names include:

=== Politics and government ===
- Chiang Wei-kuo (蔣緯國, 1916–1997), Republic of China general and politician
- Nie Weiguo (聂卫国, born 1952), Chinese politician
- Lo Wai-kwok (盧偉國, born 1953), Hong Kong politician
- Yu Weiguo (于伟国, born 1955), Chinese politician in Fujian
- Han Weiguo (韩卫国, born 1956), People's Liberation Army lieutenant general
- Gong Weiguo (龚卫国, born 1972), Chinese politician

=== Sport ===
- Peng Weiguo (彭伟国, born 1971), Chinese footballer
- Tam Wai-kwok (譚偉國, born 1977), Hong Kong footballer

=== Other ===
- Lawrence Ng Wai-kwok (伍衛國, born 1954), Hong Kong television actor
- Lin Weiguo (林卫国, born 1970), Chinese chess player
- Weiguo Sun (孙卫国), president of Xihua University in Chengdu, Sichuan, China since 2009

== See also ==
- Chinese given name
