= Siyuan Programme =

Chinese university training programme

Siyuan Programme (simplified Chinese: 思源计划; traditional Chinese: 思源計劃; pinyin: Sīyuán Jìhuà) is a training programme for excellent students at Tsinghua University, Fudan University, Renmin University of China, Xiamen University, Sun Yat-sen University and Jilin University. This programme is sponsored by Professional & Educational Services Ltd (PESI) and is carried out under the leadership of both Student Department of School Committee of Communist Party and School Committee of Youth League. With the idea of “ Receive help, Self-Help and then Help Others”, Siyuan is aimed at training excellent students to understand the essence of dedication, innovation and leadership. Every spring, Siyuan will recruit its new members from freshmen; those elected are out-standing students with different major backgrounds. Once admitted, these students will have the chance to be trained at social work, to perceive the situation of the country and to cultivate a global horizon.

Siyuan started in Tsinghua and has spread to other 5 universities by now. It selects 30 students a year from each university.

== Name ==
The name of the programme, Siyuan, which means “to remember the wellhead”in Chinese, comes from the Chinese idiom “Never forget where one's happiness comes from”. This name is closely related to the concept and idea of this programme. (For more, please refer to the “Idea” part.)

== Sponsor ==
The initiator of Siyuan Programme is Doctor QIAN Bingyi, who is now the director of Professional Education Systems Institute (PESI), which is a Non-Profit organization of people united by Chinese-North in California, founded in 1988. The organization works for promoting the education and profession exchange between North America and Asia. Dr. Qian graduated from University of California, Berkeley and gets his PHD at University of California, San Francisco.

Another initiator is Mr. ZHU Weiren(Sandy Chau), who is both a successful entrepreneur in the IT industry and a kind Philanthropist. He is now a board member of Achievo Corporation in California, the USA and the president of Shin Shin Educational Foundation, US. He also graduated from UC Berkeley.

Tsinghua Entrepreneurs & Executive Club (TEEC) is an independent non-government organization founded by Tsinghua alumni, dedicated toward promoting innovation and start-ups in high-tech industries. When Mr. Zhu Weiren decided to set up the Siyuan Programme in Tsinghua, he wanted to match each student in this programme with a mentor. Some Tsinghua alumni who have carved out in IT industry came up with the idea to start up Tsinghua Entrepreneur Group (TEG), the predecessor of TEEC. There is a Siyuan Committee in TEEC to deal with the contact between entrepreneurs and students. TEEC has been supporting Siyuan Programme since it was set up in 2001.

== Idea ==
The idea of Siyuan can be interpreted as “Receive help, Self-Help and Help Others”. Actually, this idea was first put forward by the founders of TEEC. Narrowly speaking, “Receive help” means that Tsinghua students benefit from Tsinghua’s education; “Self-Help” means that Tsinghua alumni help each other when they go to work and fight for their cause; “Help Others” means that successful alumni give their hands to students with their experience. But in a general sense, Siyuaners prefer the following explanation. “Be Helped” means “be helped by anyone when they need help especially when they are at school”, “Self-Help” means “help each other who are related to Siyuan Programme especially students themselves”, “Help Others” means “help those who need help most according to one’s capability”. The “cycle” lays stress on social responsibility and the spirit of service.

== Training Programme ==
Every student selected by the programme will be trained according to the training plan. The current version of the plan contains two main aspects: summer practice and training during the semesters.

The summer practice will last throughout the whole four years of these undergraduates. They take part in three practice programme during three summer holidays respectively. The themes of the three practice programme are “Rural and China”, “Economics and China” and “Globe and China”. During “Rural and China”, which is in the first summer, students go to underdeveloped areas in China. They support the education there as tutors and investigate the poverty and problems of development. “Economics and China” requires students to go to the developed areas in China, such as the Yangtze River Delta, to realize the fast development after the Reforming and Opening-up Policy was carried out in 1978. In the third year, with the programme “Globe and China”, students go to Hong Kong to broad their horizons and understand the globalization of China today.

During the three years at school, there are also three themes: “Team Work”, “Volunteerism and Organizing Skills” and “Leadership Training”. Students will take part in orientation, a course called “Introduction to the Social Service of College Students”, youth forums, etc.

== Organization ==
Every spring, Siyuan will select excellent freshmen from all departments. After the writing test and interview, the list of new Siyuaners will be open to the public. Students graduated in different years are named after ordinal numbers. The first Siyuaners are the 2001 ones, who are called Siyuan 1st, so the most recent ones are called Siyuan 7th. There will be one or two support tutors assigned to the new Siyuaners every year.

Siyuan is organized under the leadership of Organization Department of School Committee of Youth League. In the year 2008, Siyuan formed a complete organization called Siyuan Group. There are 5 subgroups in charge of Contact & Investigation, Propaganda & Planning, Inner Quality Expanding, Networks & Websites, Internal Liaison and Recruiting separately. The Siyuaners manage themselves in this organization and facilitate the development of the programme.

The mission of Contact & Investigation Group is to do some researches on the influence the programme itself has on Siyuaners, i.e. whether they have understood the idea of “Be Helped, Self-Help and Help Others”. Besides, they have to update the contact information so that Siyuaners can keep in touch with each other even when they graduate from school.

Planning & Promotion Group takes charge of the propaganda work. They edit stuff to bring this programme known to outsiders. The materials will also be useful when the website is being set up. Sponsors, teachers and assistants are all glad to keep up with what Siyuaners are doing now. So Propaganda & Planning Group plays really an important role.

Inner Quality Expanding Group searches for information of lectures, exhibitions and performances. Then they organize Siyuaners in different grades to attend these activities, which not only edifies their minds but also facilitates communications.

Networks & Websites Group is in charge of Siyuan’s own website. The website hasn’t been set up until Nov, 2008.

Internal Liaison Group organizes literature and sport activities regularly to build up relations between Siyuaners, which include some favorite and popular ones, such as football games and Kara OK.

Recruiting Group recruits new members for the programme. Every spring, they filter resumes, design examinations, help to interview students and finally help to decide who will be selected as new members.
