= Song Chaohua =

Chinese politician

- 宋朝华

Vice Chairperson of the Sichuan Provincial People's Congress
- In office February 2021 – January 2025
- Chairperson: Peng Qinghua; Wang Xiaohui

Personal details
- Born: February 1962 (age 64) Qionglai County, Sichuan, China
- Party: Chinese Communist Party (1983–2025; expelled)
- Education: Wenjiang Normal School (now Xihua University)

Chinese name
- Simplified Chinese: 宋朝华
- Traditional Chinese: 宋朝華
Transcriptions
Standard Mandarin
- Hanyu Pinyin: Sòng Chāohuá

Song Chaohua (Chinese: 宋朝华; born February 1962) is a former Chinese politician who spent his entire career in southwest China's Sichuan province. He was investigated by China's top anti-graft agency in April 2025. Previously he served as vice chairperson of the Sichuan Provincial People's Congress. He was a delegate to the 12th National People's Congress.

== Early life and education ==
Song was born in Qionglai County (now Qionglai), Sichuan, in February 1962. In 1980, he enrolled at Wenjiang Normal School (now Xihua University), where he majored in Chinese language and literature.

== Career in Chengdu ==
After graduation in 1983, Song successively taught at Pujiang Daxing Middle School and Pujiang Teacher Training School. Song joined the Chinese Communist Party (CCP) in June 1983, and got involved in politics in February 1984, when he became an official in the Office of the Standing Committee of the Pujiang County People's Congress. In March 1985, he was transferred to the Organization Department of the CCP Chengdu Municipal Committee, and worked for eight years. In March 1993, he became executive deputy head of the Organization Department of the CCP Dayi County Committee, rising to head four months later. He served as magistrate of Dayi County from March 1997 to October 1997, and party secretary, the top political position in the county, from October 1997 to December 2002. He became party secretary of Xinjin County in December 2002, and served until August 2006. He was party secretary of Chenghua District in August 2006, in addition to serving as chairperson of the People's Congress.

== Career in Meishan ==
Song served as executive vice mayor of Meishan in August 2008, and was later promoted to the mayor position in November 2011.

== Career in Nanchong ==
He became mayor of Nanchong in March 2016, and then party secretary, the top political position in the city, beginning in September 2016.

== Career in Sichuan Provincial People's Congress ==
In February 2021, he took office as vice chairperson of the Sichuan Provincial People's Congress, the province's top legislative body.

== Investigation ==
On 25 April 2025, Song was put under investigation for alleged "serious violations of discipline and laws" by the Central Commission for Discipline Inspection (CCDI), the party's internal disciplinary body, and the National Supervisory Commission, the highest anti-corruption agency of China. On November 3, he was stripped of his posts within the CCP.

On 22 September 2026, Song was sentenced to death sentence with reprieve at Guiyang Intermediate People's Court, for taking bribes in 148 million yuan.

Government offices
Preceded by Xiang Dong	Mayor of Meishan; 2011–2016	Succeeded by Wu Qungang
Preceded by Li Jing	Mayor of Nanchong; 2016	Succeeded by Luo Jiaming
Party political offices
Preceded by Li Zhongbin	Communist Party Secretary of Nanchong; 2016–2021	Succeeded by Liu Qiang
