= Collected Papers of History Studies =

Chinese-language professional journal

- Frequency: Bimonthly
- Founded: 1956
- Country: China
- Based in: Changchun, Jilin
- Language: Chinese
- Website: shixuejikan.cn
- ISSN: 0559-8095

The Collected Papers of History Studies or Shixue Jikan (simplified Chinese: 史学集刊; traditional Chinese: 史學集刊; pinyin: Shǐxué jíkān) is a Chinese-language professional history journal sponsored by Jilin University and supervised by the Ministry of Education of the People's Republic of China. The journal was founded in 1956 and is based in Changchun City, Jilin Province.

Collected Papers of History Studies was originally published semi-annually, but it was changed to a quarterly journal in 1981. Since 2006, the journal has been published bimonthly, and has publicly distributed in China and abroad.

As it was difficult to sustain in the Anti-Rightist Campaign, Collected Papers of History Studies ceased publication in 1958. In October 1981, the journal resumed publication.
