= XHU =

XHU or Xhu may refer to:

- xhu, the ISO 639-3 code for Hurrian language
- Xihua University, a provincial public university in Chengdu, Sichuan, China
