= Annunciation Seminary, Bailu =

Former Catholic seminary in Sichuan, China

Annunciation Seminary Seminarium Annuntiationis
- 领报修院
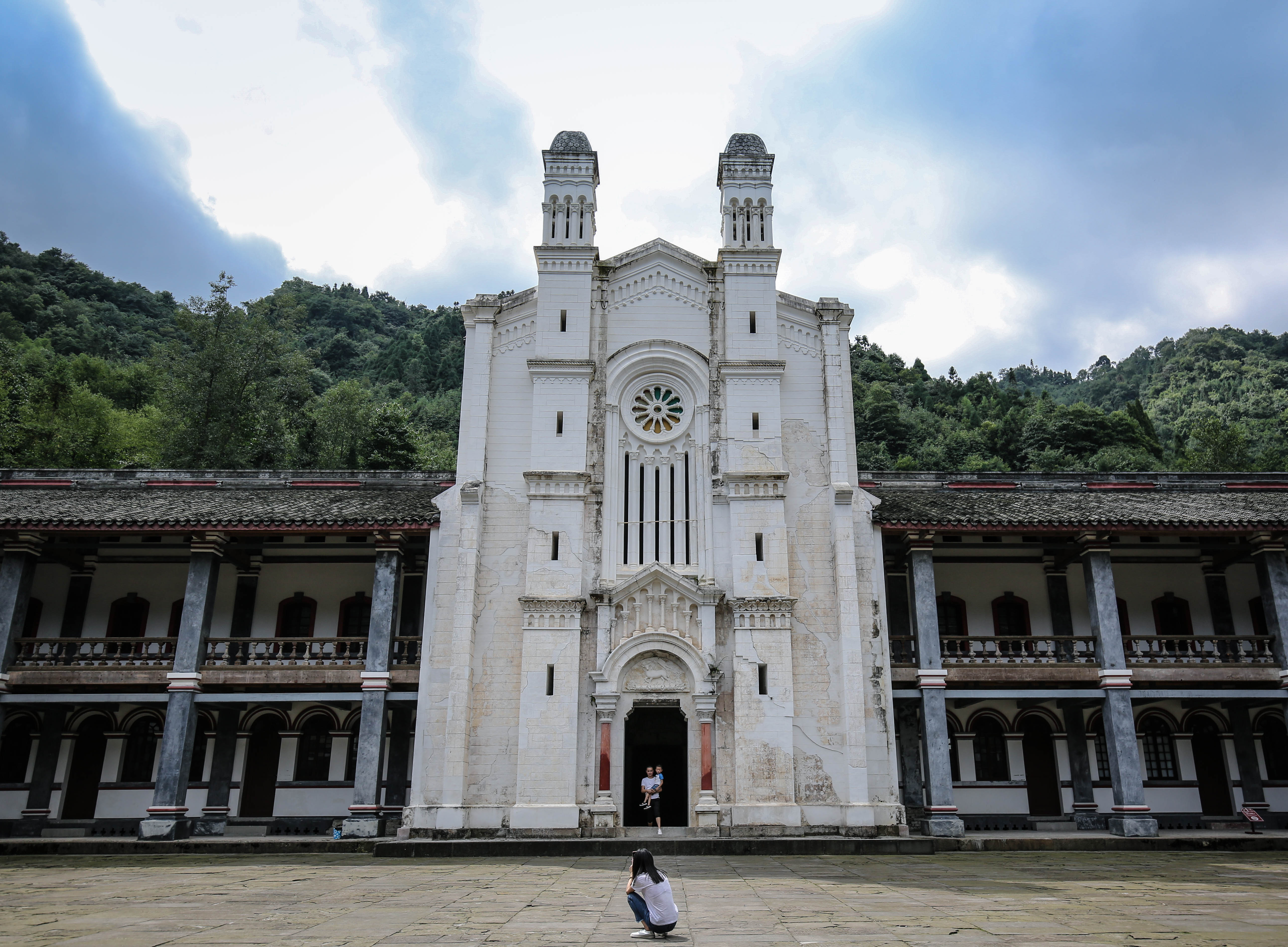
- Annunciation Seminary, restored after its collapse in 2008 Sichuan earthquake

- Location within Sichuan Location within China

General information
- Architectural style: French
- Location: Bailu, Pengzhou, Sichuan, China
- Coordinates: 31°13′49″N 103°54′48″E
- Construction started: 1895
- Completed: 1908

Technical details
- Size: 10,440 m^{2} (112,400 sq ft)

Annunciation Seminary, Bailu
- Traditional Chinese: 領報修院
- Simplified Chinese: 领报修院
- Literal meaning: Annunciation Abbey
Transcriptions
Standard Mandarin
- Hanyu Pinyin: Lǐngbào Xiūyuàn

Annunciation Seminary, (Note: simplified Chinese: 领报修院; traditional Chinese: 領報修院; pinyin: Lǐngbào Xiūyuàn; Sichuanese romanization: Lin^{3} Pao^{4} Siu^{1} Üen^{4}; lit. 'Annunciation Abbey'.) commonly referred to by the Latin name Seminarium Annuntiationis, is a former Catholic seminary in Bailu, Pengzhou, Sichuan, southwestern China. The seminary was operated by French missionaries from 1908 to 1949, and is one of the largest French-styled church complexes in Sichuan.

Following the departure of the French missionaries in 1949, the seminary complex was eventually abandoned. It was later named a Major Historical and Cultural Site Protected at the National Level of China, and despite being severely damaged in the 2008 Sichuan earthquake, it was restored in 2016.

== Naming ==
The seminary is known by many different names across several languages. The Latin name "Seminarium Annuntiationis" is inscribed at the entrance of the building. In his 1917 book Les Missions de Chine et du Japon, J.-M. Planchet called the seminary the "Grand Séminaire", distinguishing it from the other seminary in Pengzhou for younger students, which he called the "Petit Séminaire". In Chinese, the seminary site is known as Lingbao Xiuyuan (领报修院, 'Annunciation Seminary') or Shang Shuyuan (simplified Chinese: 上书院; traditional Chinese: 上書院; pinyin: Shàng Shūyuàn; lit. 'Upper College').

== History ==
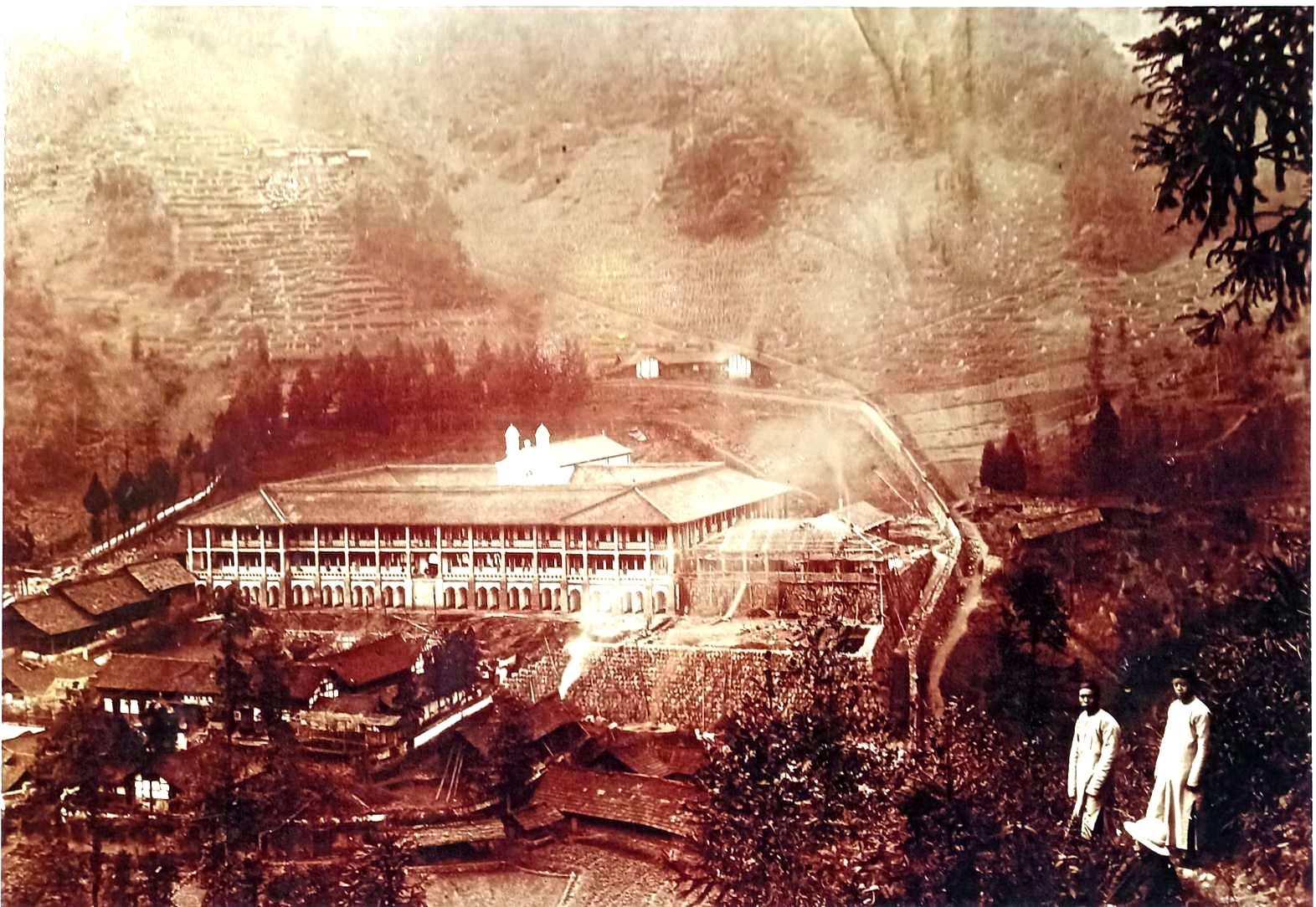
In 1908, after 13 years of construction, the Annunciation Seminary, Bailu was about to be completed.

The French Catholic presence in Sichuan began when Pope Benedict XIV entrusted the Paris Foreign Missions Society to evangelize the province in 1753. The French priest Marie-Julien Dunand, who was the Apostolic Vicar of Sichuan, planned for a regional seminary in the countryside after an anti-missionary riot broke out in Chengdu in 1895.

The construction of the seminary complex began in 1895 and was overseen by the French priest Alexandre Perrodin. Local architects and workers participated in building the seminary, and it was completed in 1908.

J.-M. Planchet, in his 1917 book Les Missions de Chine et du Japon, referred to the seminary as the "Grand Séminaire" of the Apostolic Vicariate of Northwestern Sichuan. According to Planchet, Perrodin headed the seminary, which also had two Chinese leaders, Irénée Ouang and André Tong. Perrodin died in China in 1933.

After the founding of the People's Republic of China in 1949, the French missionaries left and the seminary ceased its operations.

== Architecture ==
=== Before the People's Republic of China ===
==== Construction ====
According to Han Yang, upon its completion in 1908, the seminary complex had a total building area of 6,740 m^{2} (72,500 sq ft). The complex was divided into five distinct areas, which included the chapel, west, south, north, and east sides, with the east side building featuring three floors and the remaining three sides consisting of two floors each. The chapel was centrally located on the western side of the complex. A central courtyard, spanning approximately 600 m^{2} (6,500 sq ft), was enclosed within the complex.

According to Gao Wei, the seminary complex was constructed using a combination of brick and wood materials. The walls were built with local bricks, but the beams, columns and other components were made of wood. The complex's roof was built in the chuandou structural system (穿斗式). The exterior of the chapel was made of marble and plastered white. Local workers in 2017 asserted that the marble and stained glass of the chapel were brought from France.

According to Gao Wei, the complex was a blend of Chinese and western architectural styles. The four sides of the seminary were in traditional Chinese style. However, the chapel was neo-Gothic, and the pillars of the seminary complex were neo-Romanesque.

==== Mudslide damage ====
In the early 20th century, the upper seminary's west side and the backside of the chapel were damaged by a mudslide. The exact year of the mudslide is uncertain, with some sources reporting it to be 1928 while others suggest it occurred in 1934.

=== During the People's Republic of China ===
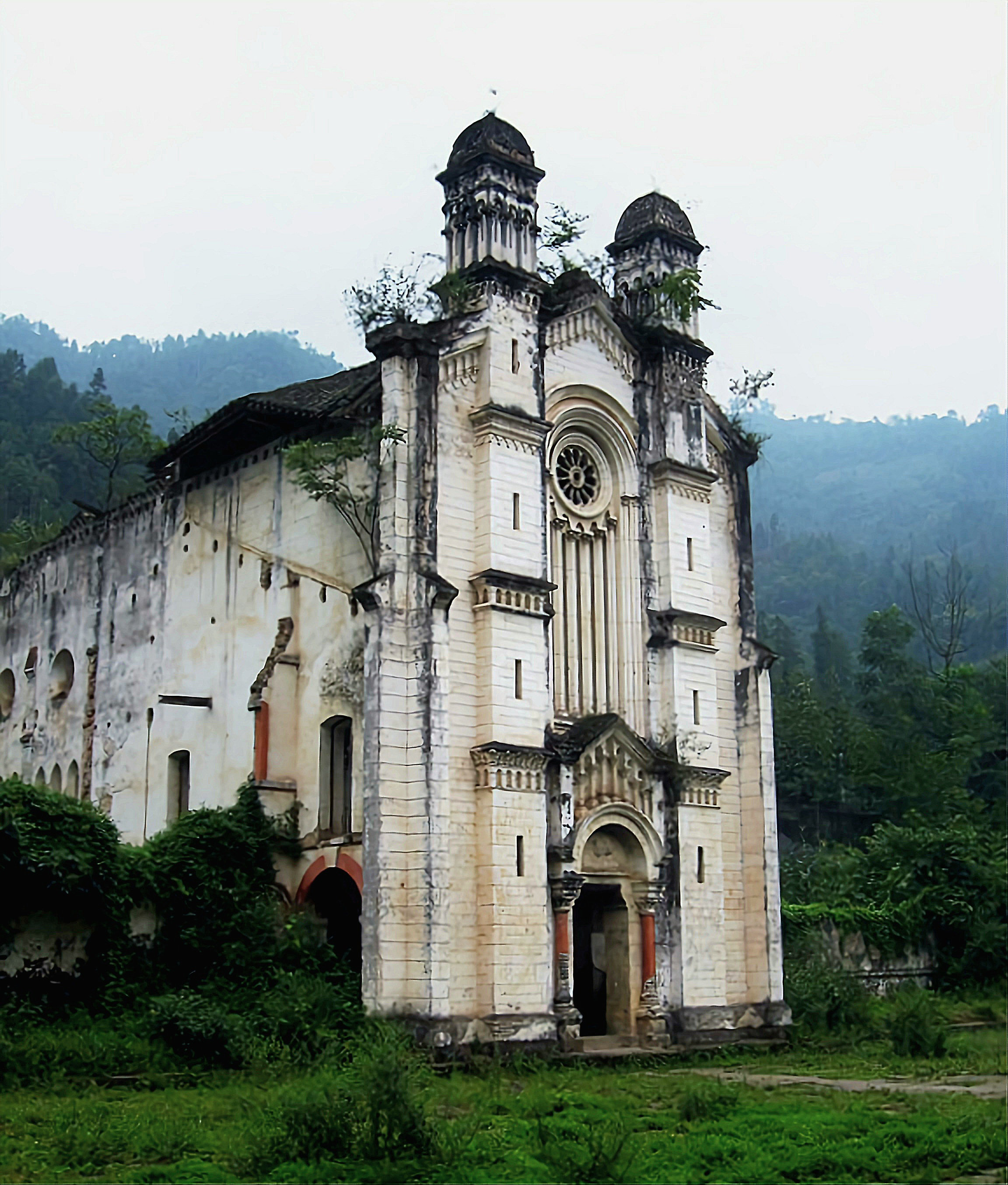
The chapel of the seminary, before the 2008 Sichuan earthquake

Following the departure of the French missionaries, the seminary ceased its operations, but its subsequent history is subject to differing accounts. According to China Daily, the building was used as a local elementary school campus, an office building, a storehouse, and a hospital. Gao Wei, on the other hand, asserted that no one used the building after the elementary school moved out in 1951. Aurore Staiger from Historia magazine claimed that the seminary was briefly used to house the elderly in 1949 before the government shut down the site in 1950. Despite these variations, all sources agree that the site eventually fell into abandonment.

In 1989, the building was listed as a county-level protected cultural site.

In 2003, a report from China Daily stated that the local Catholic church had assigned locals to maintain the building while allowing them to grow corn on the grounds of the campus. In 2004, the site's protection level was raised to the province level. In May 2006, it was registered as a Major Historical and Cultural Site Protected at the National Level of China.

==== 2008 Sichuan earthquake ====
Most of the seminary complex collapsed during the earthquake on May 12, 2008. According to witnesses, when the earthquake happened, there were couples posing for wedding photos at the site. The site collapsed eight to ten seconds after the earthquake started, but no one was injured.

In late May 2008, the National Cultural Heritage Administration surveyed the cultural heritage sites in Sichuan and appointed Beijing Institute of Ancient Architecture (北京市古代建筑研究所) to assist the restoration of the seminary. In June 2008, Sichuan Provincial Cultural Heritage Administration (四川省文物管理局) confirmed the decision to rebuild the seminary complex. The Chinese State Council mentioned the seminary in the "Cultural and Natural Heritage" section of a notice it issued in September 2008 regarding restoration and reconstruction efforts after the earthquake.

In an interview in June 2008, the head of Beijing Institute of Ancient Architecture, Han Yang, considered it "difficult" to rebuild the seminary complex. In 2009, he conducted a comprehensive study of the architecture of the seminary before the earthquake, the impact of the earthquake, and potential methods of restoration.

==== Reconstruction ====
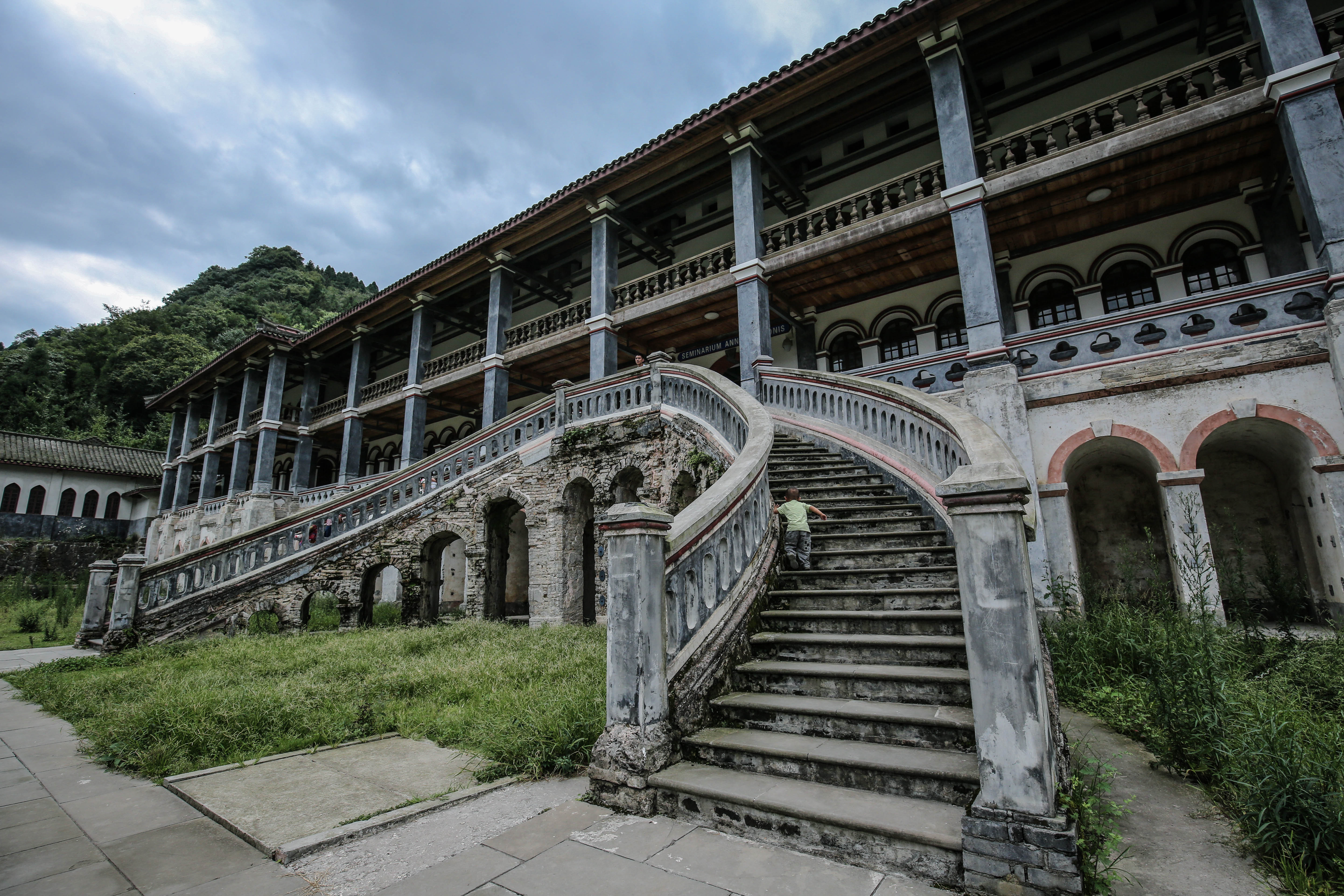
The grand staircase after restoration. The Latin inscription "Seminarium Annuntiationis" can be seen on the second floor.

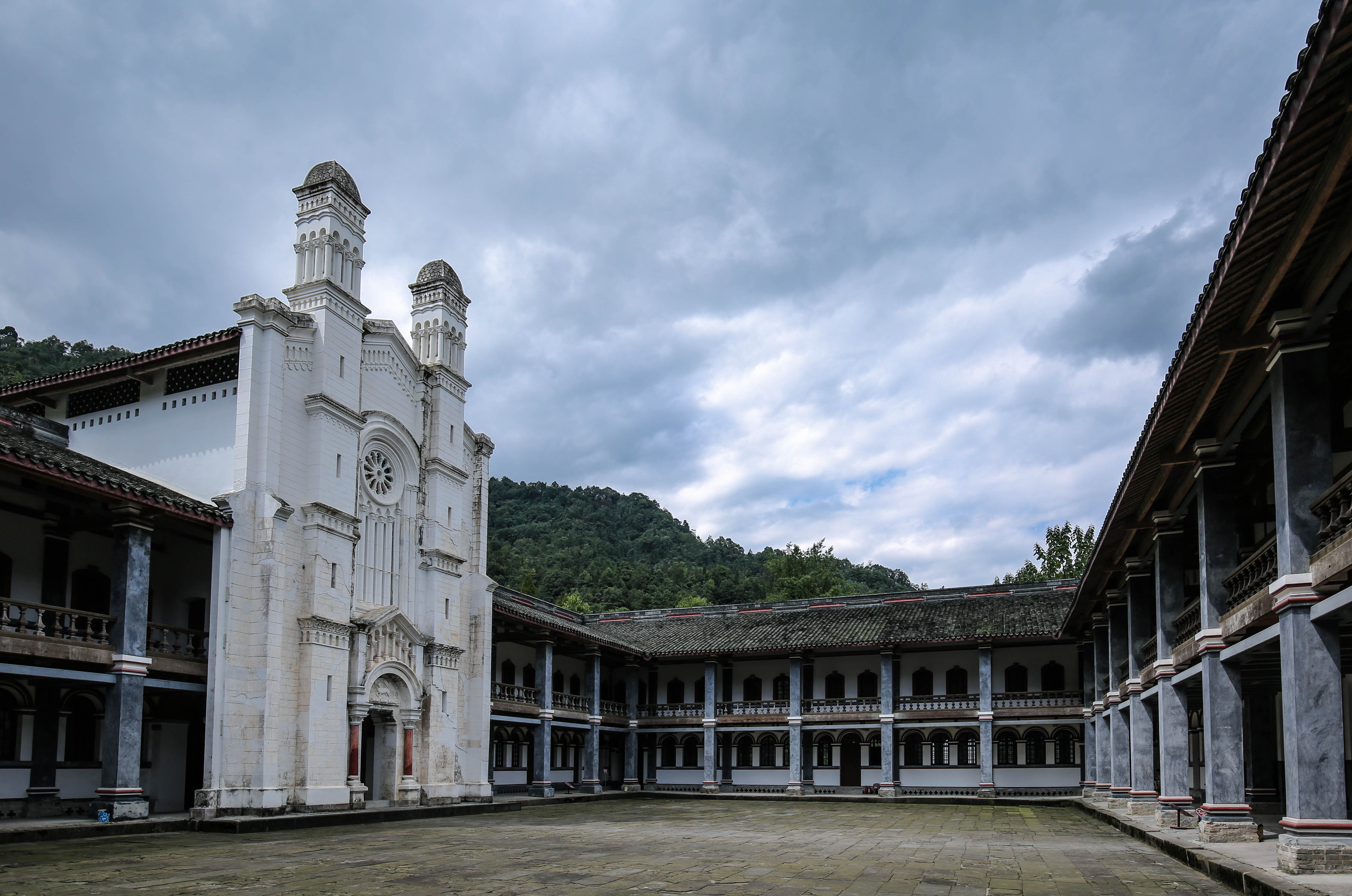
The inner court with the chapel

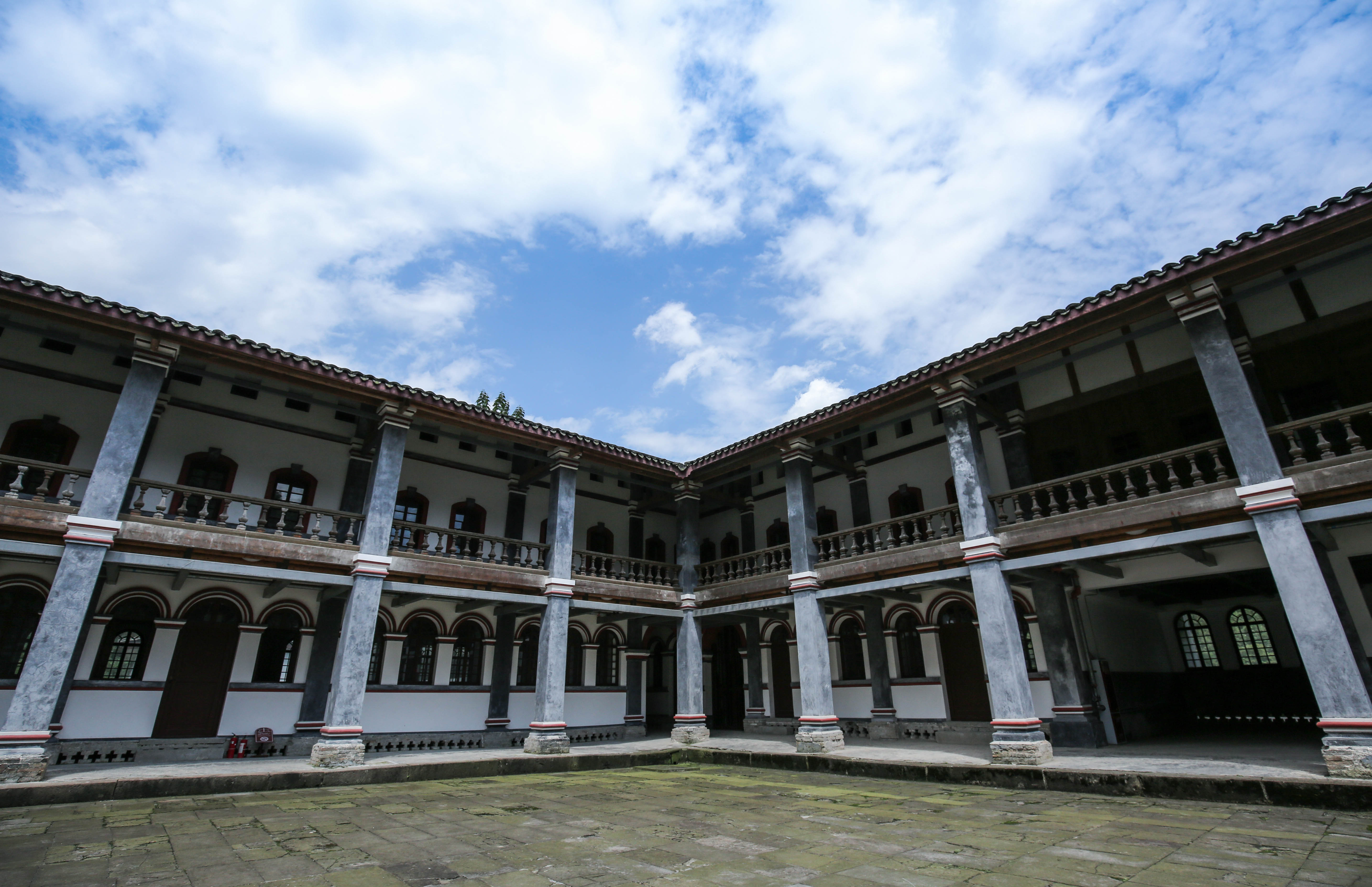
A corner of the inner court

According to Gao Wei, reconstruction of the building commenced in 2009 and was completed in 2016. The process was impeded by the loss of the original design and blueprints from the French. Despite this setback, the restored complex retains a similar exterior appearance, structure, and floor plan to the original design, though different materials were used. The four sides were rebuilt in steel-concrete composite structures.

The chapel was rebuilt differently than it was first built. It was reconstructed with a steel roof but without the original crosses. The stained glass was replaced with PVC, and the rib vaults were replaced with cloister vaults. The decorative element on the ceiling was also not restored, and the top of the chapel towers was redesigned.

However, during the reconstruction, the part of the chapel buried in the 1934 mudslide was cleaned and excavated. It is then preserved and incorporated as a part of the restored chapel.

According to Aurore Staiger, Tang Ming, the grandson of a priest who once served at the seminary, discovered many artifacts related to the seminary, including the altar which had been stolen and sold multiple times. As of 2016, Tang Ming was working for Pengzhou's heritage protection services, and he stored the collected artifacts in a room in the restored site.

As of 2019, it remains unclear what purpose the rebuilt seminary complex will serve in the future. Gao Wei suggested that the complex could be turned into a cultural and recreational center, a philanthropic educational center, a historical museum, or it could continue to serve religious purposes.

== Notable people ==
- Wang Liangzuo (王良佐), a Sichuan priest ordained in 1948. In November 1950, Wang published a Declaration of Self-Reliance and Reform (自立革新宣言) that called to "sever all ties with imperialism" and echoed Three-Self sentiments. He then became a member of the 6th–8th Chinese People's Political Consultative Conference and vice chairman of the 3rd–6th Catholic Patriotic Association of China. He was also the 1st–3rd chairman of Sichuan Catholic Seminary.

== Cultural influences ==
- The Chinese poet Zhong Ming (鐘鳴) mentioned Annunciation Seminary in his poem "Stay Overnight in Bailu Town" (夜宿白鹿鎮).

== See also ==
- Catholic Church in Sichuan
- List of Catholic seminaries
