= Xihua =

Xihua may refer to:

- Xihua County, in Henan, China
- Xihua University, in Chengdu, Sichuan, China
