= Lanzhou–Chengdu Pipeline =

Crude oil pipeline in China

Location
- Country: China
- Direction: North–south
- Start: Lanzhou
- Passes through: Gansu; Shaanxi; Sichuan
- To: Pengzhou

General information
- Type: Crude oil
- Owner: China National Petroleum Corporation
- Construction started: November 2010
- Commissioned: March 2013

Technical information
- Length: 880 km (550 mi)
- Maximum discharge: 0.02008 million barrels per day (~1.001×10^{6} t/a)
- Diameter: 24 in (610 mm)

The Lanzhou–Chengdu Pipeline is a crude oil pipeline in China. Connected to the Ürümqi–Lanzhou pipeline, it transports crude oil produced in Xinjiang as also imported through the Kazakhstan–China oil pipeline to south-western China. Among other customers it supplies the Pengzhou refinery. The pipeline is owned by China National Petroleum Corporation.

== History ==
The pipeline project was announced in 2007 and it was approved in September 2010. Construction started in November 2010. The pipeline was completed in March 2013.

== Technical description ==
The 880-kilometre (547 mi) pipeline starts at the Lanzhou terminal and finish at the Pengzhou terminal. It runs through Gansu, Shaanxi and Sichuan provinces. En route it traverse China's most challenging terrain, including the Qin Mountains.

Capacity of the pipeline is 20,080 barrels per day (3,192 m^{3}/d), equal to 10 million tons per year. The pipeline has a diameter of 24 inches (610 mm). It uses X65 spiral submerged-arc-welded pipes. Its maximum working pressure is 13.4 megapascals (1,940 psi), and its hydraulic head is 2,207 metres (7,241 ft). It has the highest pipe pressure and largest hydraulic head among the pipelines in China.

The cost about US$527 million.
