= Bailu, Pengzhou =

Bailu 白鹿镇
- Town
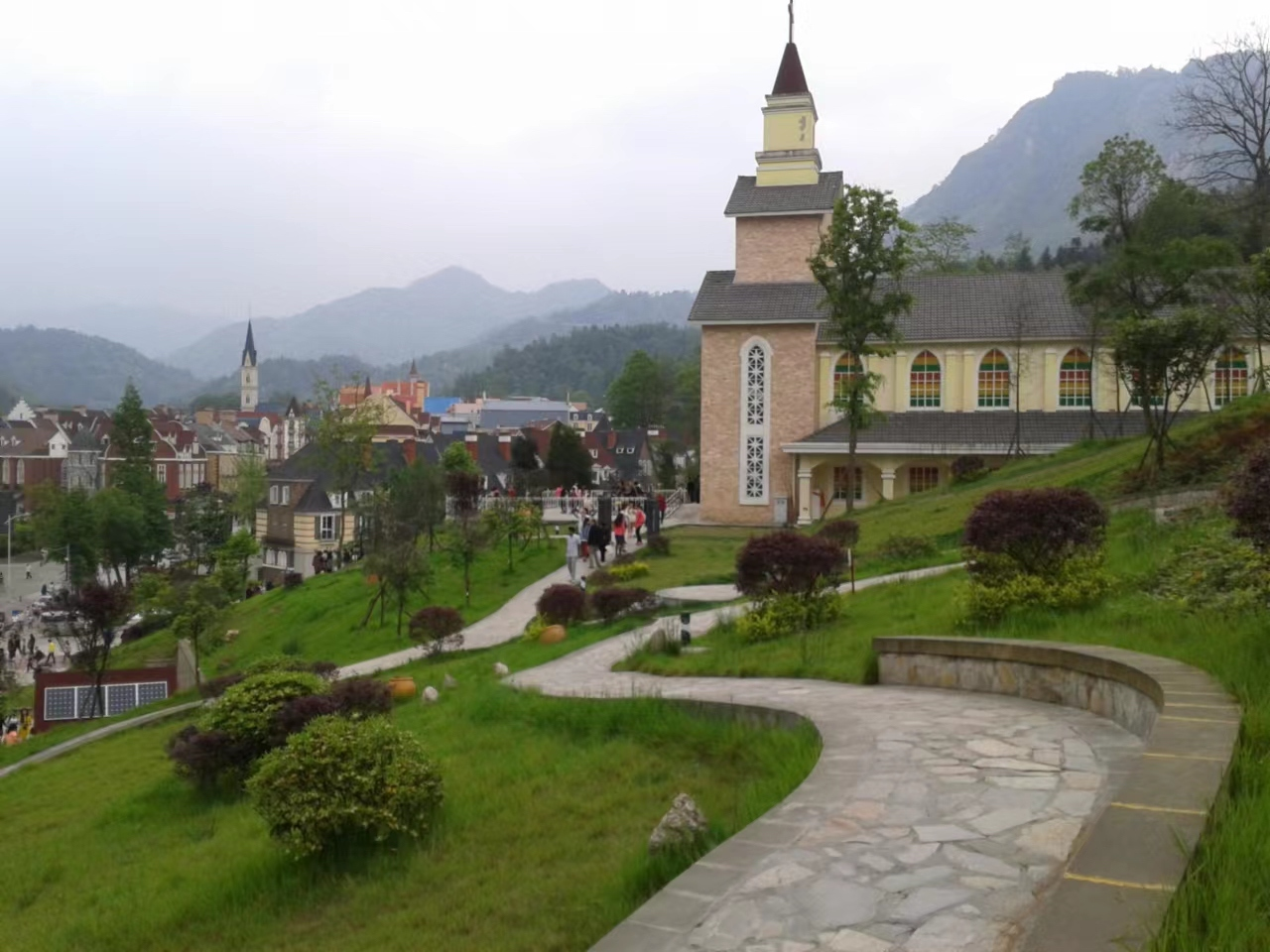
- Catholic church overlooking Bailu Town

- Location in Sichuan
- Coordinates: 31°12′35″N 103°54′51″E
- Country: China
- Province: Sichuan
- Prefecture-level city: Chengdu
- County-level city: Pengzhou
- Time zone: UTC+8 (China Standard)

Bailu (Chinese: 白鹿; pinyin: Báilù; Sichuanese romanization: Pe^{5}-lu^{5}; lit. 'White Deer') is a town under the administration of Pengzhou, Sichuan, China. As of 2018, it has one residential community and eight villages under its administration.

== Tourist marketing ==
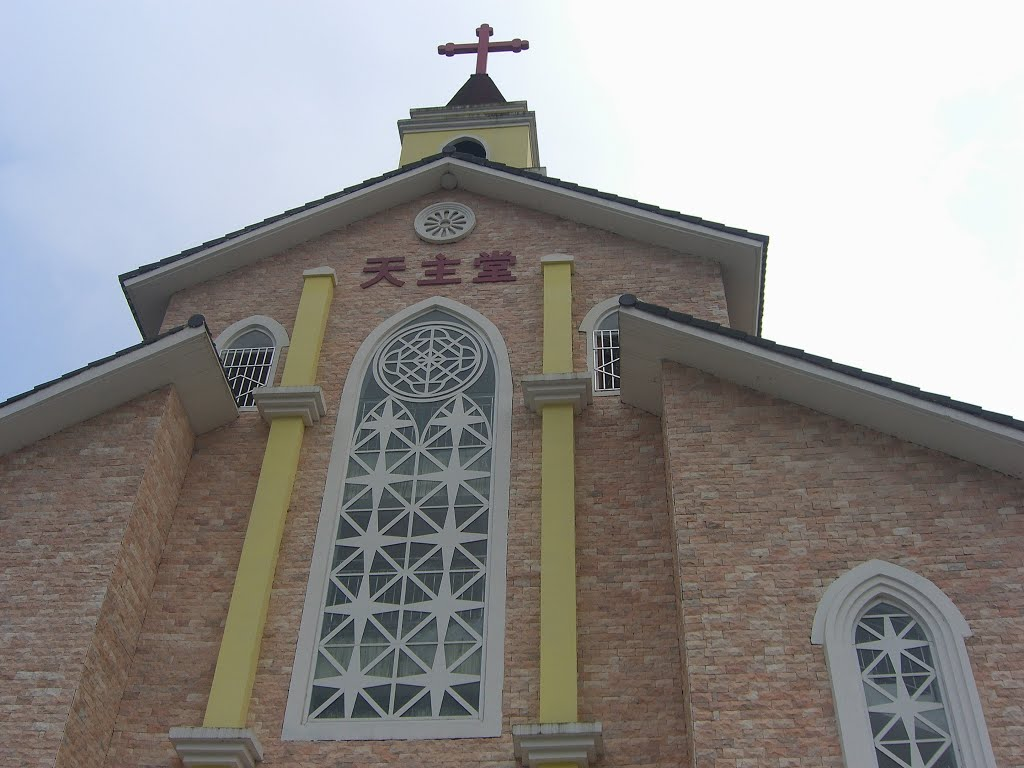
The rebuilt Catholic church at Bailu

Bailu has been developed into a so-called "French town" due to its French Catholic heritage, according to Xianghui Liao, however, the real reason for this designation is to serve tourism and economic development: "This led to the commercialization of once authentic religious sites for tourism and economic development as part of the secularization process. [...] Catholicism's public influence on tourism and economic development has been increasing, while its activities and church attendance have not followed synchronously."

== Tourist attractions ==
- Annunciation Seminary
- Earthquake Heritage Park

== Honor Record ==
- July 2020: The National Patriotic Health Campaign Committee reconfirmed Bailu Township as a national health township.
- September 2020: Selected as a town with cultural tourism characteristics in Sichuan Province.

== See also ==
- Catholic Church in Sichuan
- Marie-Julien Dunand
- List of township-level divisions of Sichuan

== Travel Recommendations ==
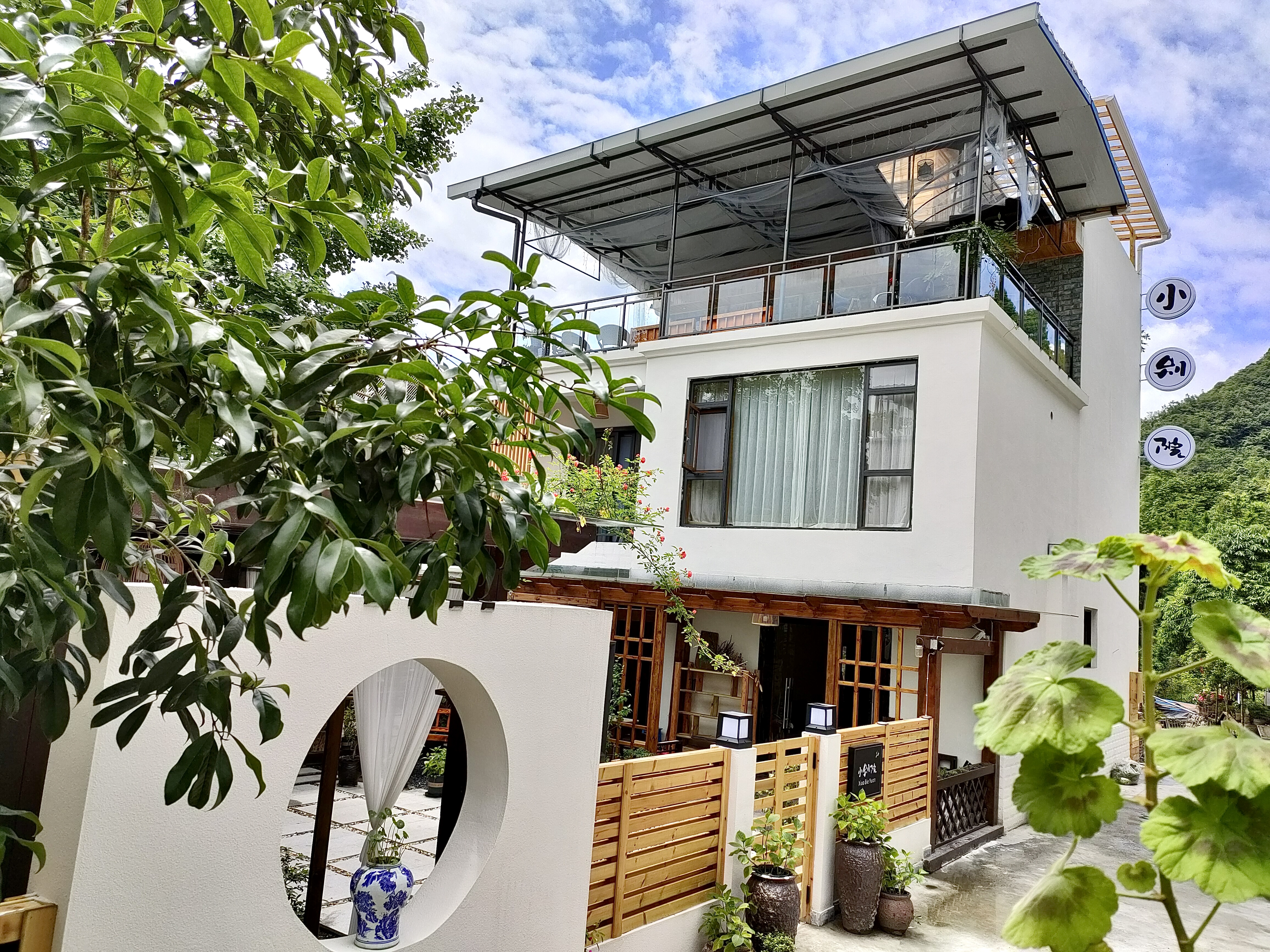
Xiao Bei Yuan Tea Culture B&B

- Xiao Bei Yuan Tea Culture B&B (小别院茶文化民宿): No.14, Shuyuan Road, Bailu Town (白鹿镇书院路14号)
