= Zhu Wenxiong =

Chinese linguist and scholar

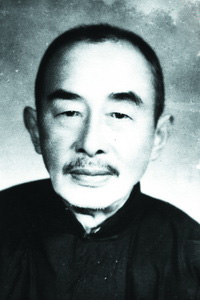
- Born: 12 February 1883; Kunshan
- Died: 4 March 1961 (aged 78); Suzhou

Zhu Wenxiong (Chinese: 朱文熊) was a Chinese linguist and scholar of the early 20th century. He is known books such as New Jiangsu letters (Jiangsu xin zimu) (1906), which was an influential works in modern Chinese linguistics. In regarding to language reform in early 20th century China, he once said in 1906: "What I expect of my country's people is for us to be able to stand on our own in this competitive world. It is impossible to achieve universal education if the writing system is not easy to use, and it is impossible to attain strong unity if there is no uniform national language."

He has also taught various universities in China, such as Jilin University, Beijing Normal University, and Zhejiang University.
