= Ying Xu =

Ying Xu (Chinese: 徐鹰; pinyin: Xú Yīng) is a computational biologist and bioinformatician, and a chair professor under the title 'Regents-Georgia Research Alliance Eminent Scholar' in the Department of Biochemistry and Molecular Biology and the Institute of Bioinformatics at the University of Georgia, United States.

== Early life and education ==
Xu was born in Changchun, Jilin Province of China, to a family of two chemists in the early 1960s. Both his parents were professors in Jilin University. He spent part of his childhood in a remote rural area in Fuyu County of Jilin from 1969 to 1972.

Xu graduated from the Computer Science Department, Jilin University with a B.S. and a M.S. degree in 1982 and 1985, respectively. He then attended the University of Colorado Boulder starting in 1986, and received a Ph.D. degree in computer science in 1991.

== Career and research ==
He worked for Colorado School of Mines from 1991 to 1993 as a visiting assistant professor, and then joined the Computer Science and Mathematics Division of Oak Ridge National Laboratory in 1993. There he was a research associate, staff scientist, senior staff scientist and group leader from 1993 to 2003. He joined the University of Georgia as an endowed chair professor in 2003. At the University of Georgia, he is also a member of the Cancer Center.

His research is mainly focused on computational and systems biology relevant to human cancers and their early detection, microbial genomes and pathway encoding, and plant genomes and cell walls.

== Education and Honors ==
- B.S. in computer science, Jilin University, China, 1982
- M.S. in computer science, Jilin University, China, 1985
- Ph.D. in computer science, University of Colorado Boulder, 1991
- Eminent Scholar, Georgia Research Alliance
- Distinguished Scholar, Georgia Cancer Coalition
- Fellow, American Association for the Advancement of Science
- Fellow, IEEE
