= Zhihe Subdistrict, Pengzhou =

Zhihe Subdistrict 致和街道
- Subdistrict
- Location in Sichuan
- Coordinates: 30°57′7″N 103°58′37″E
- Country: China
- Province: Sichuan
- Prefecture-level city: Chengdu
- County-level city: Pengzhou
- Time zone: UTC+8 (China Standard Time)

Zhihe Subdistrict (Chinese: 致和街道; pinyin: Zhìhé Jiēdào) is a subdistrict situated in Pengzhou, Sichuan, China. As of 2020, it administers the following 15 residential neighborhoods and seven villages:

- Shuanglong Community (双龙社区)
- Taiping Community (太平社区)
- Beijingtang Community (北京堂社区)
- Wanjia Community (万家社区)
- Changqing Community (长庆社区)
- Dongyuan Community (东远社区)
- Shunhe Community (顺和社区)
- Huitonghu Community (汇通湖社区)
- Huxian Community (护贤社区)
- Puzhao Community (普照社区)
- Qinglin Community (清林社区)
- Lianfeng Community (连封社区)
- Qingyang Community (清洋社区)
- Baixiang Community (百祥社区)
- Xingren Community (兴仁社区)
- Mingtai Village (明台村)
- Huatu Village (花土村)
- Guyun Village (古云村)
- Hexing Village (和兴村)
- Longpan Village (龙盘村)
- Gaoqiao Village (高桥村)
- Heyuan Village (和源村)

== See also ==
- List of township-level divisions of Sichuan
