= Zhou Ji (Tsinghua University) =

Zhou Ji is the "Changjiang Scholar" distinguished Professor, at the School of Materials Science & Engineering, of Tsinghua University, China

He received a B.S. from Jilin University, Changchun in 1983, a M.S. from Changchun Institute of Physics, Chinese Academy of Sciences in 1986, and a Ph.D. from Peking University, Beijing in 1991. He was then a Post-doctoral Research Fellow, at Tsinghua University, Beijing from 1991-1993, and then Research Associate, Hong Kong University of Science & Technology 1993-1995 followed by a year as Material Scientist, AEM, Inc., USA. He was appointed Associate Professor, at Tsinghua University, Beijing in 1993 and promoted to Professor in 1998.

His areas of research Interest include Dielectric based metamaterials, combining of metamaterials and natural materials, development of new functional materials through metamaterial routes, and investigation of new physics systems based on metamaterials.

Among his most cited papers are: Qian Zhao1, Lei Kang, Bo Du1, Bo Li1, Ji Zhou1, Hong Tang, Xiao Lian2 and Baizhe Zhang "Electrically tunable negative permeability metamaterials based on nematic liquid crystals" Applied Physics Letters vol 90 011112 (2007) with 350 citations according to Google Scholar.
