= Cheng Ying (oncologist) =

Chinese doctor (1963–2025)

- Born: December 1962; China
- Died: July 2025 (aged 62); China
- Medical career
- Field: Oncology
- Institutions: Jilin Cancer Hospital
- Sub-specialties: Lung cancer

Cheng Ying (Chinese: 程颖; December 1962 – July 2025) was a Chinese oncologist, physician-scientist, and hospital administrator. She was the director of Jilin Cancer Hospital and a leading figure in cancer research in China, particularly in the field of lung cancer. Her work as a principal investigator for major clinical trials, including studies funded by AstraZeneca, earned her international recognition.

== Early life and education ==
Cheng Ying was born in 1962. She graduated from Bethune Medical University (now part of Jilin University) in July 1986, embarking on a career in medicine that would span nearly four decades.

== Career ==
Cheng spent her career at Jilin Cancer Hospital, where she held several positions, including director, deputy president, president, and party secretary. She also served as director of the Jilin Provincial Cancer Center and the Jilin Provincial Lung Cancer Diagnosis and Treatment Center.

Cheng was a vice president of the Chinese Society of Clinical Oncology (CSCO) and chairwoman of its Small Cell Lung Cancer Committee. She was also vice-chairman of the Lung Cancer Professional Committee of the Chinese Anti-Cancer Association.

In 2009, Cheng received the Chinese Physician Award, described as the highest honor for a medical professional in China. In 2014, the Chinese Hospital Association named her an "Outstanding Hospital President." In October 2017, her workspace at Jilin Cancer Hospital was designated the Cheng Ying Model Worker Innovation Studio.

== Research and clinical trials ==
Cheng specialized in clinical research on cancer, particularly small-cell lung cancer (SCLC). She was ranked first nationally for seven consecutive years from 2018 based on the number of newly initiated cancer clinical trials. A 2019 report on investigators conducting cancer clinical trials also ranked her first in several categories.

Cheng was the lead principal investigator of the ADRIATIC study, a global clinical trial funded by AstraZeneca. The results, published in The New England Journal of Medicine in September 2024, found that durvalumab improved overall survival and progression-free survival in patients with limited-stage SCLC following chemoradiotherapy.

== Death ==
Cheng died suddenly between 2 and 9 July 2025 at the age of 62. The cause of death was not publicly announced. Her last public appearance was reportedly on 10 May 2025, at the annual meeting of the small-cell carcinoma committee of the Chinese Anti-Cancer Association.
