= Sun Weiguo =

Chinese physicist (born 1954)

Sun Weiguo (Chinese: 孙卫国; born April 16, 1954) is a Chinese physicist. He is Professor and former President of Xihua University in Chengdu, Sichuan.

== Biography ==
Sun was born in Chengdu on April 16, 1954. He earned his bachelor's degree in chemistry in 1977 from Xihua Normal University in Chengdu, and his master's degree in 1981 from Jilin University. He taught physical chemistry courses as a lecturer at Sichuan University from 1982 to 1986.

He went to the United States in 1986 and studied with Prof. C. William McCurdy in physical chemistry at Ohio State University, earning his Ph.D. degree in February 1992. He worked as a "participating guest" and postdoctoral researcher at Lawrence Livermore National Laboratory and at the Department of Physics and Astronomy of the University of Oklahoma from 1991 to 1994.

In October 1994, he was appointed professor of physics at Sichuan University, and served as a vice president of the university from 2000 to 2009. He was in charge of undergraduate education, continuing education, and distance education. As one of the members of the university leader team, he and his colleagues changed the traditional university education system into a credit system, reformed the education assessment and supervision system, and developed distance education and vocational education.

In February 2009, he was appointed professor of physics and president of Xihua University, succeeding Luo Zhongxian (罗中先).

His research interests in science are electron-molecule scattering, atomic and molecular photoionization, molecular vibrational and rovibrational spectra, and molecular potentials.
