= Long Yifei =

Long Yifei (Chinese: 龙翼飞; pinyin: Lóng Yìfēi; born October 1959) is the Associate Dean of Renmin University of China Law School, expert on civil law.

== Biography ==
Long was born in Liaoning in 1959. He received his LL.B. degree from Jilin University Department of Law, LL.M. and LL.D degrees from Renmin University of China Department of Law in 1985 and 1991.

Long joined the faculty of Renmin University of China Department of Law in 1985. He is currently the Associate Dean of the Law School, and associate director of Family Law Institute of China Law Society.

On December 14, 1998, Long gave a lecture on social security to the national leaders of the PRC in the Great Hall of the People. In 2005, he was elected as one of Distinguished Contemporary Chinese Jurists.
