= Lichun, Sichuan =

Lichun 丽春镇
- Town
- Location in Sichuan
- Coordinates: 30°58′32″N 103°51′57″E
- Country: People's Republic of China
- Province: Sichuan
- Prefecture-level city: Chengdu
- County-level city: Pengzhou
- Time zone: UTC+8 (China Standard)

Lichun (simplified Chinese: 丽春; traditional Chinese: 麗春; pinyin: Lìchūn) is a town under the administration of Pengzhou, Sichuan, China. As of 2018, it has eight residential communities and 22 villages under its administration.
