= Eight Grand Ministries =

Former government building of the Manchukuo government

The Eight Grand Ministries, also called Badabu (Chinese: 八大部, pinyin: bā dà bù), refer to the former buildings of the State Council and its ministries of the Manchukuo government. They still exist almost intact on and around Xinmin Avenue of Changchun, Jilin Province, China, are used by Jilin University's Medical School and others, and have recently become one of the highlights of Changchun's sightseeing, because of their impressive, combined Chinese, Japanese and Manchurian architecture.

== Overview ==
The Eight Ministries originally referred to the eight ministerial-level administrative agencies under the State Council (43.8751299°N 125.3100035°E) of Manchukuo. They were the following ministries:

- Ministry of Public Safety
- Ministry of Justice
- Ministry of Economy
- Ministry of Communications
- Ministry of Agriculture
- Ministry of Culture and Education
- Ministry of Foreign Affairs
- Ministry of Civil Affairs.

According to the "Great Hsinking Metropolitan Plan" (Japanese: 大新京都市計画), the Manchukuo government arranged most of the office buildings of its ruling institutions on Shuntian Street in Hsinking (now Xinmin Street in Chaoyang District, Changchun City, Jilin Province, China) and its surrounding area. The office buildings were located on both sides of the avenue of 1,500 meters long and 60 meters wide (with a garden strip in the center). The northern end of this area was the construction site of the new Imperial Palace of Manchukuo (the future Puyi's palace), and on both sides of the avenue to the south were the office buildings of the State Council of Manchukuo and various government ministries. At the southern end, there was an office building of other general government agencies, next to Anmin Square (now Xinmin Square).

This large-scale office building complex was constructed in the 1930s. All buildings had the oriental characteristics, with the traditional Chinese and Japanese style roofs, and were called the "Manchurian style buildings". They were all on spacious sites, in an elegant and quiet environment, in magnificent shapes, and each with its own unique characteristics. They were surrounded by large green trees and constituted a representative block of the Garden City style of the "National Capital Construction" Plan of Manchukuo. This long strip of scenic area was commonly called the "Eight Grand Ministries" (Chinese: 八大部) by the locals, and is now listed as a National Key Scenic Area.

The new palace began construction at the northern end of the central axis in September 1938. After the outbreak of the Pacific War, its construction was suspended due to the financial constraints. By 1945, only the basement part of the main palace had been completed. In 1953, on this base was built a palace-like building of 30,000 square meters, which was used as Jilin University's Geology School (now the Changchun Geological Museum on Jilin University's Chaoyang Campus). The front of the future palace was originally planned as Shuntian Square, covering an area of 180,000 square meters, which was transformed into the green, grassy Cultural Square in 1996.

The historical buildings of the "Eight Ministries" and their neighborhood are basically intact. In June 2012, Xinmin Avenue was selected as a Historically and Culturally Famous Street of China. In March 2013, the former buildings of the State Council, the Ministry of Military, the Ministry of Justice, the Ministry of Economy, the Ministry of Communications, the Ministry of Foreign Affairs, the Ministry of Civil Affairs and Judiciary Building (Supreme Court, Hsinking District Court and Prosecutor's Office) were collectively designated as a Major Historical and Cultural Site Protected at the National Level.

The following table shows the photos, then and now, and other information of the former buildings of the "Eight Grand Ministries" and related agencies of the Manchukuo government.

Formerly
Currently
Built as
Current address
Built in
Architect
Used now by

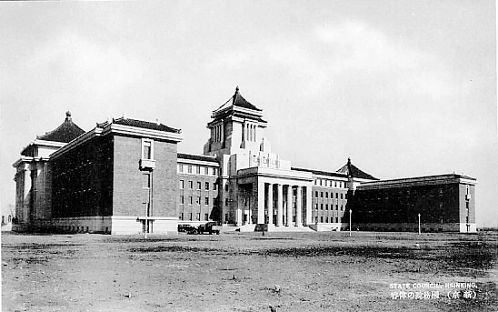

State Council
126 Xinmin St.
1936
Japan
Tatsuro Ishii (石井達郎)
Medical Center, Jilin University

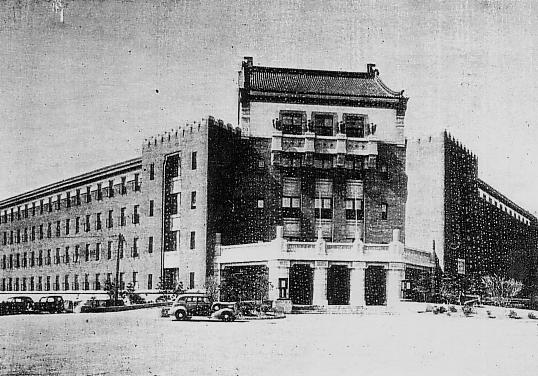

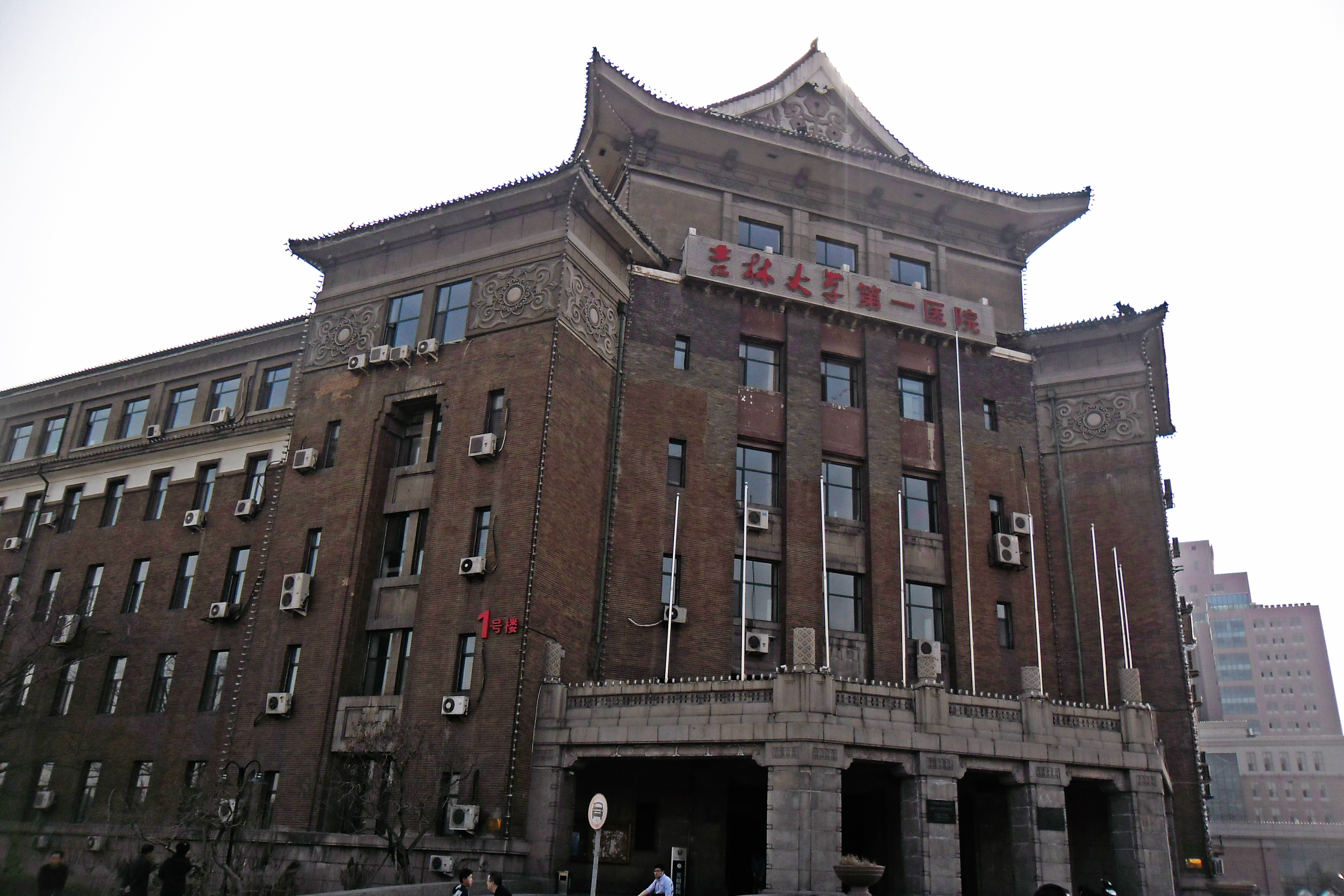
Public Safety Ministry
71 Xinmin St.
1938
Maintenance Agency
First Hospital, Jilin Univ.

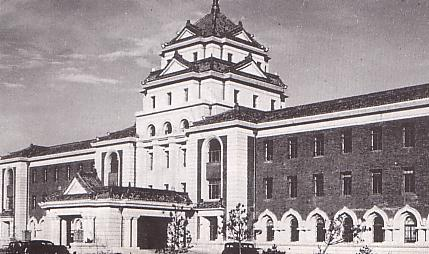

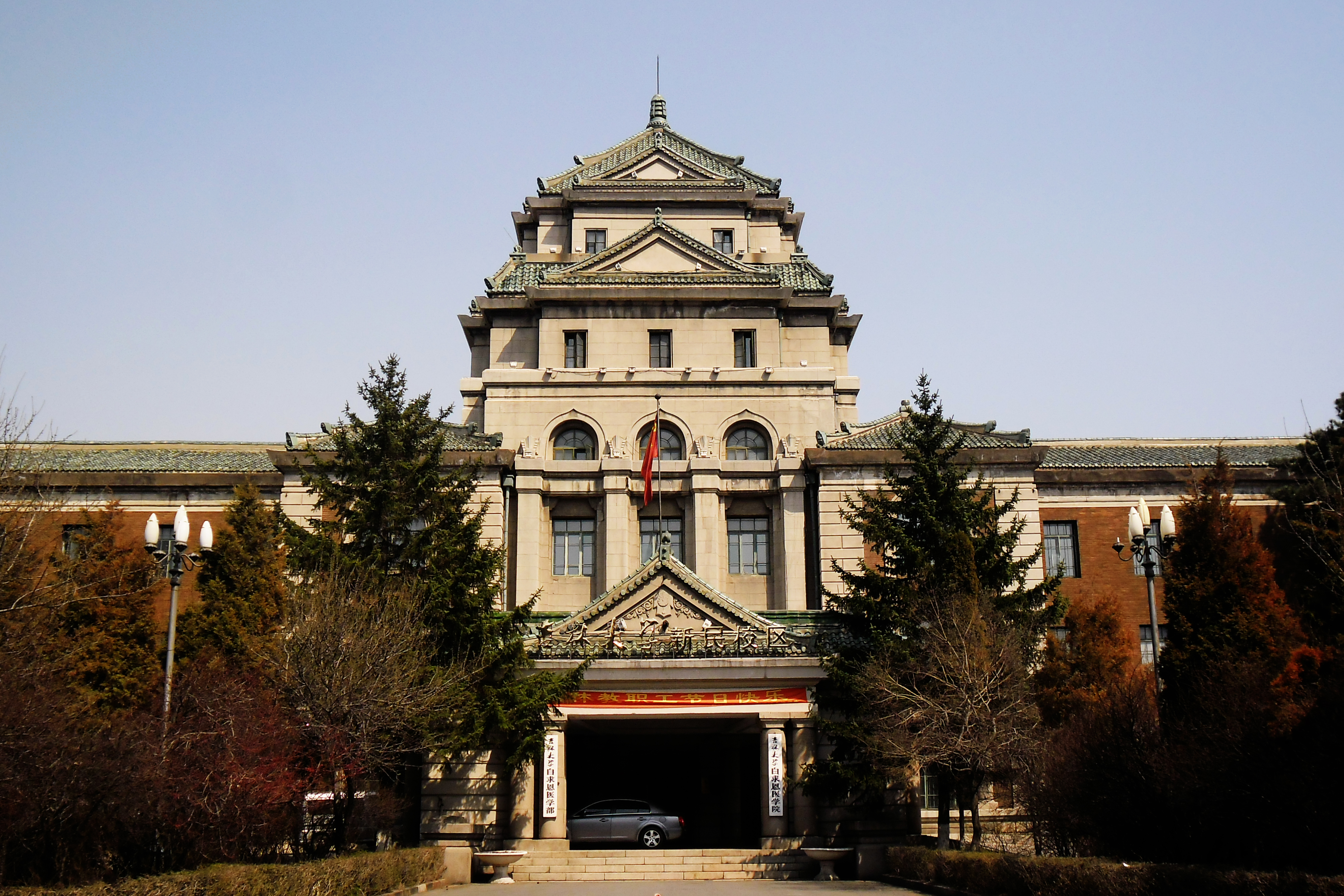
Justice Ministry
828 Xinmin St.
1936
Japan
Kensuke Aiga (相賀兼介)
Medical School, Jilin Univ.

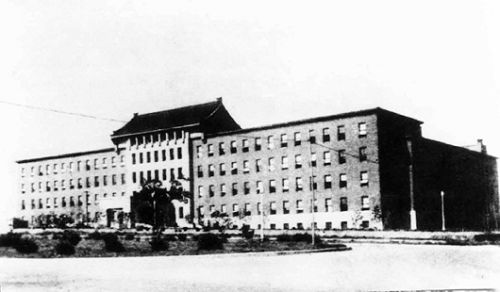

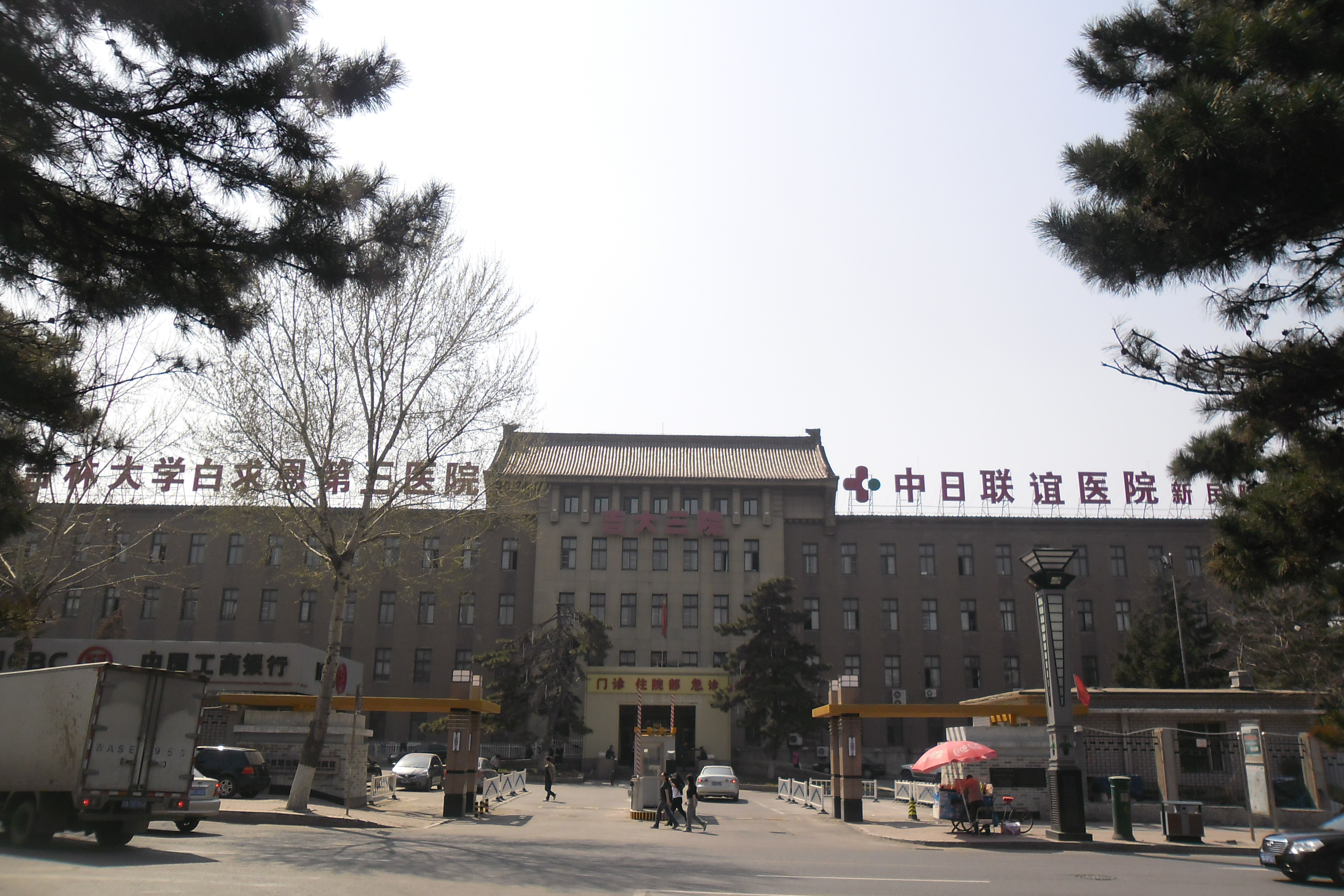
Finance Ministry
829 Xinmin St.
1939
Maintenance Agency
Second Hospital, Jilin Univ.

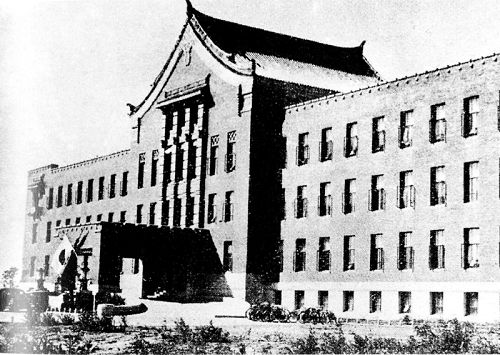

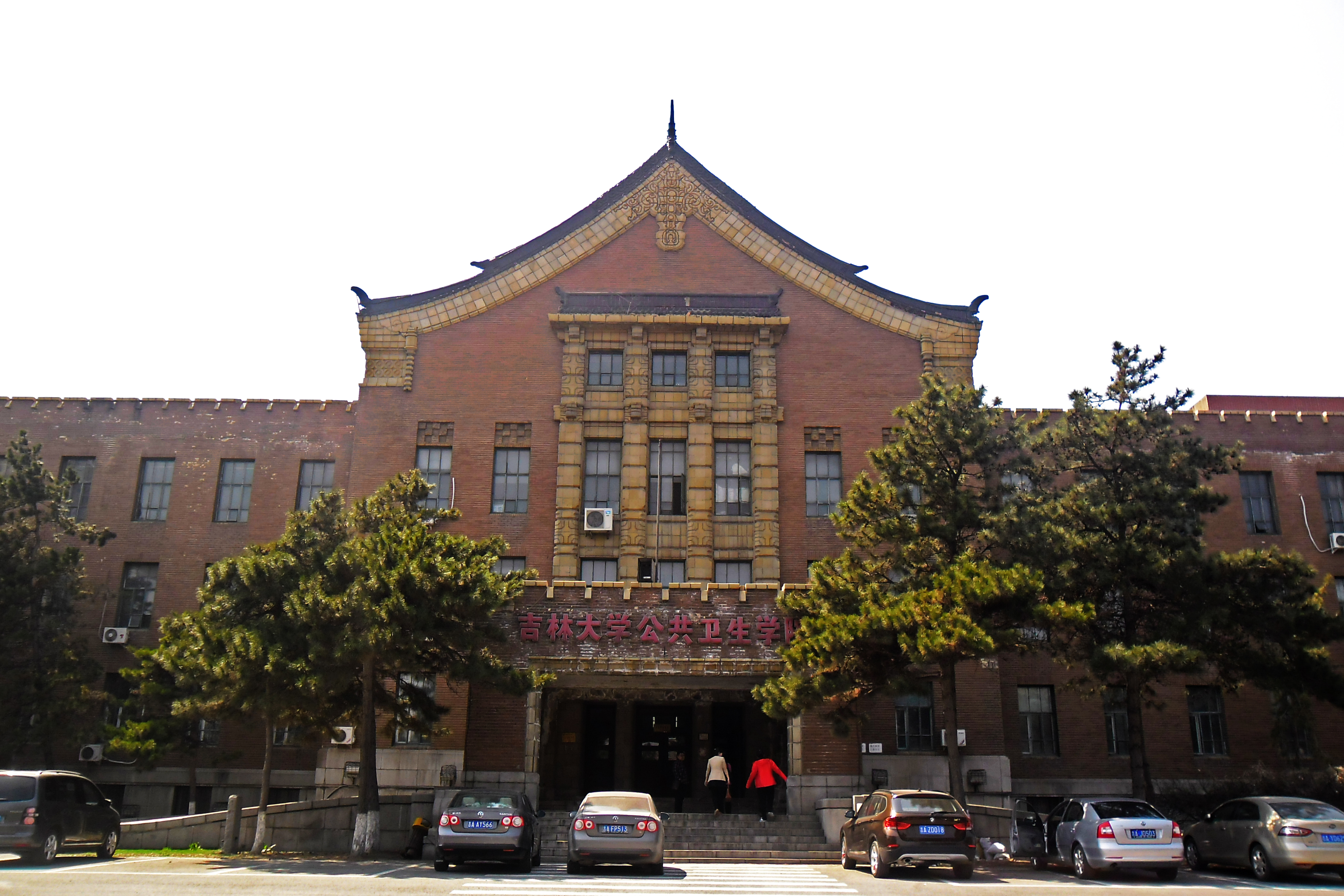
Comm. Ministry
1163 Xinmin St.
1937
Maintenance Agency
Public Health School, Jilin Univ.

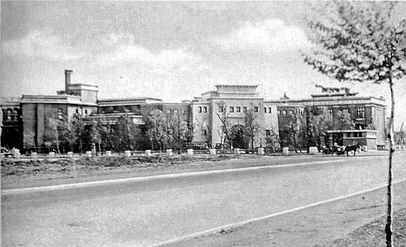

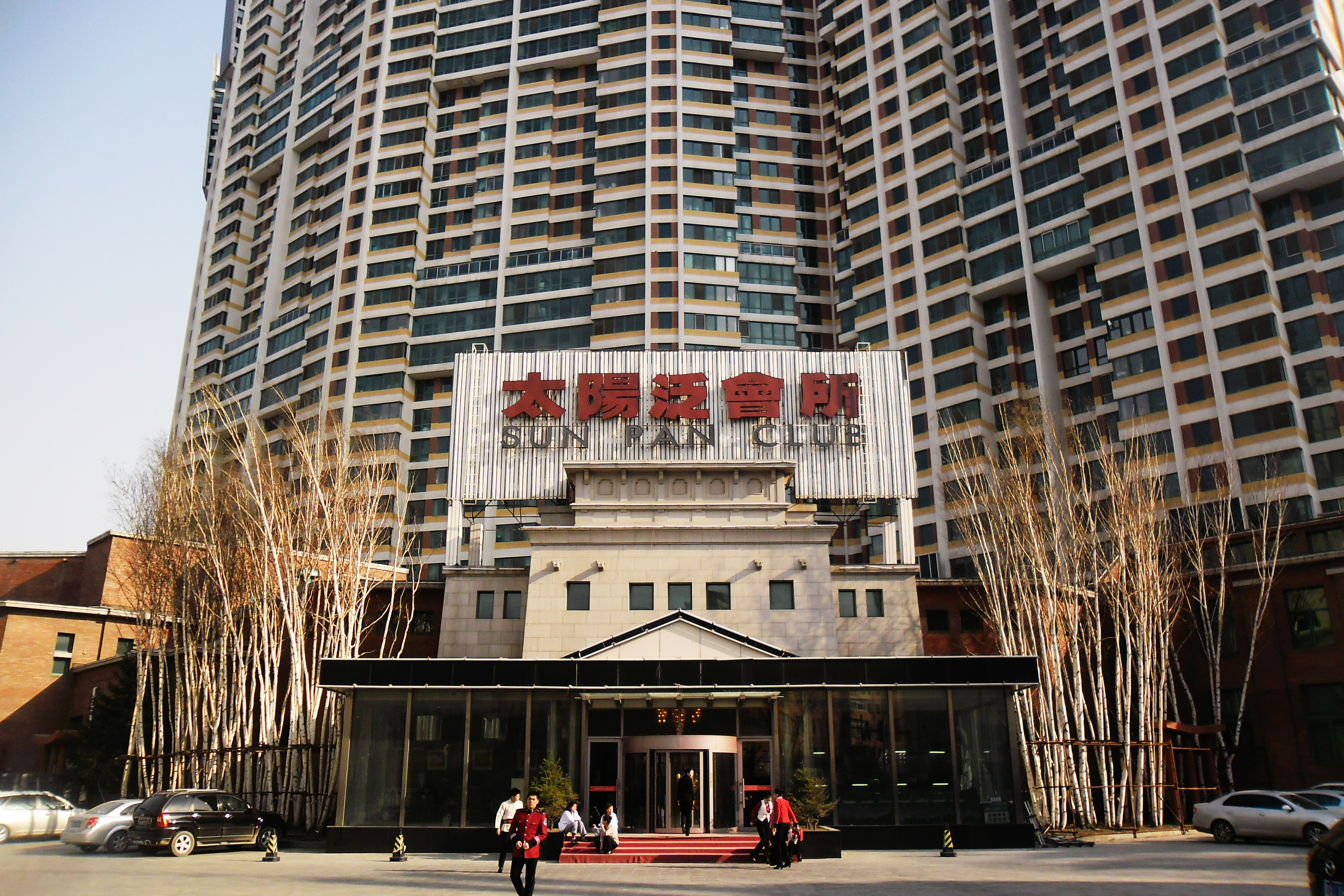
Foreign Affairs Ministry
1122 Jianshe St.
1934
France
Etablissements BROSSARD & MOPIN
Commercial use (frequent tenant turnover)

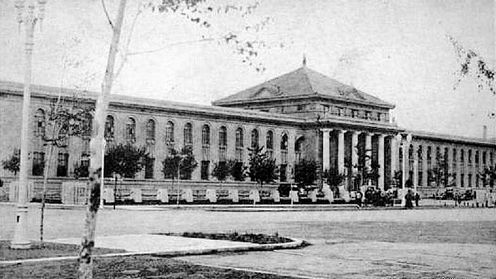

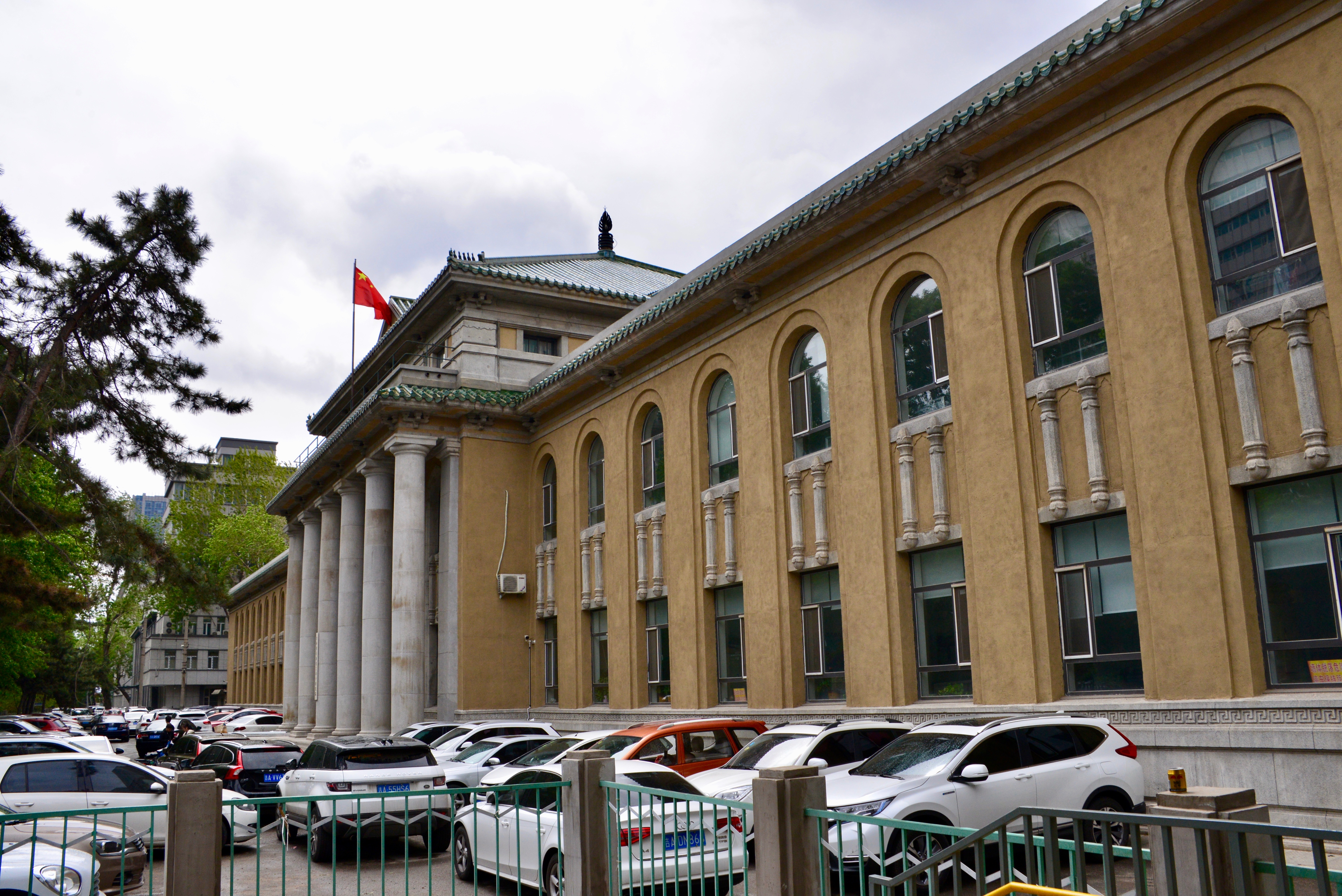
Civil Affairs Ministry
3623 Renmin St.
Prior to 1936
General Affairs Dept.
Petrochemical Institute of Jilin Province

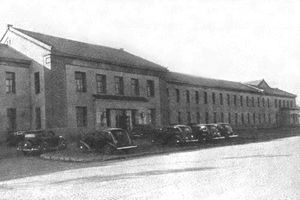

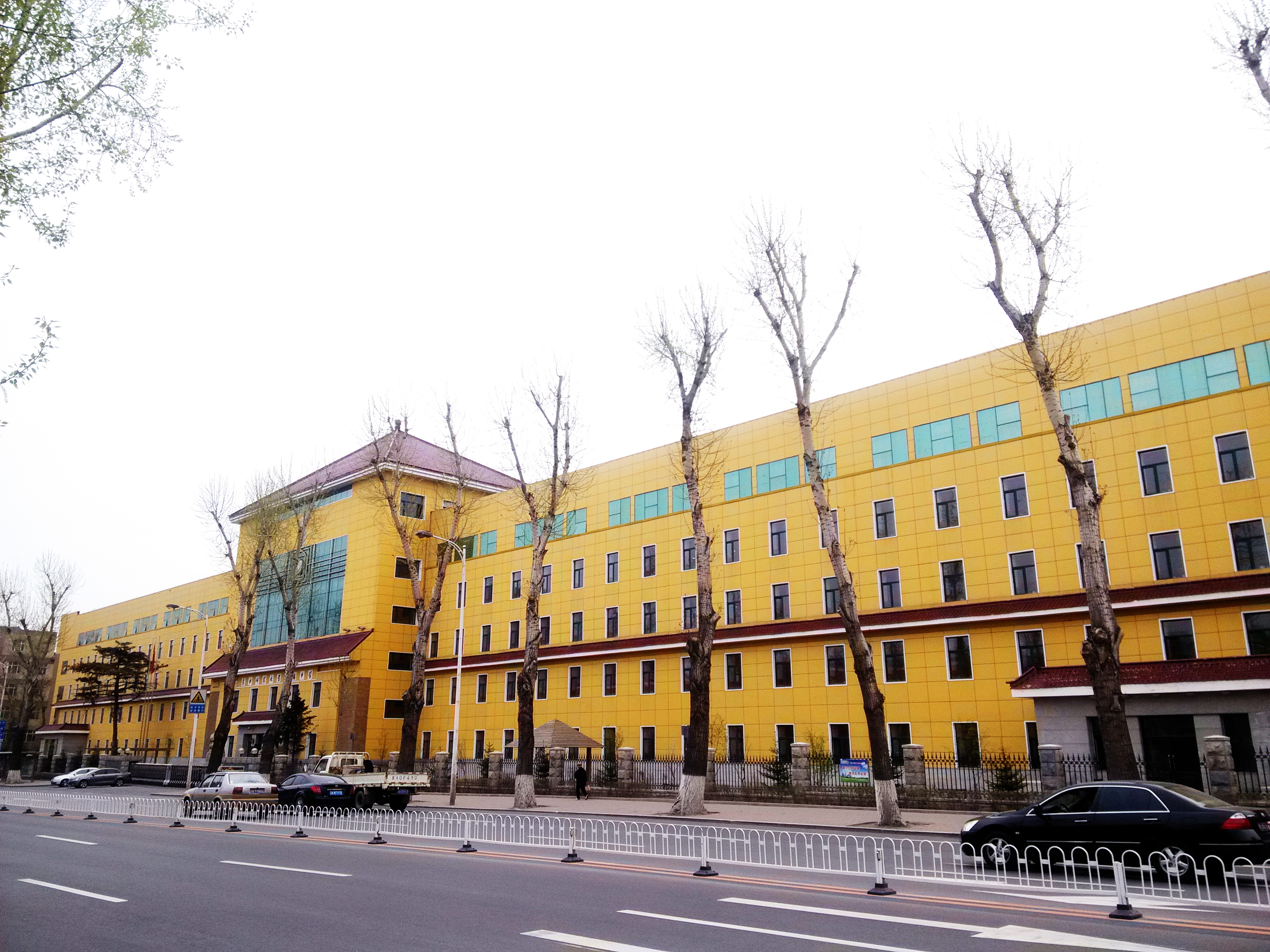
Agriculture Ministry
506 Ziyou Rd.

Demolished in 1998; replaced by a building for the High School Attached to Northeast Normal University

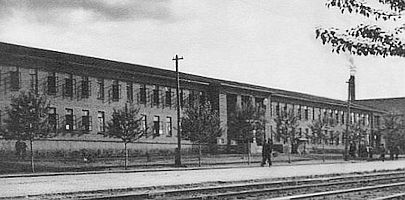

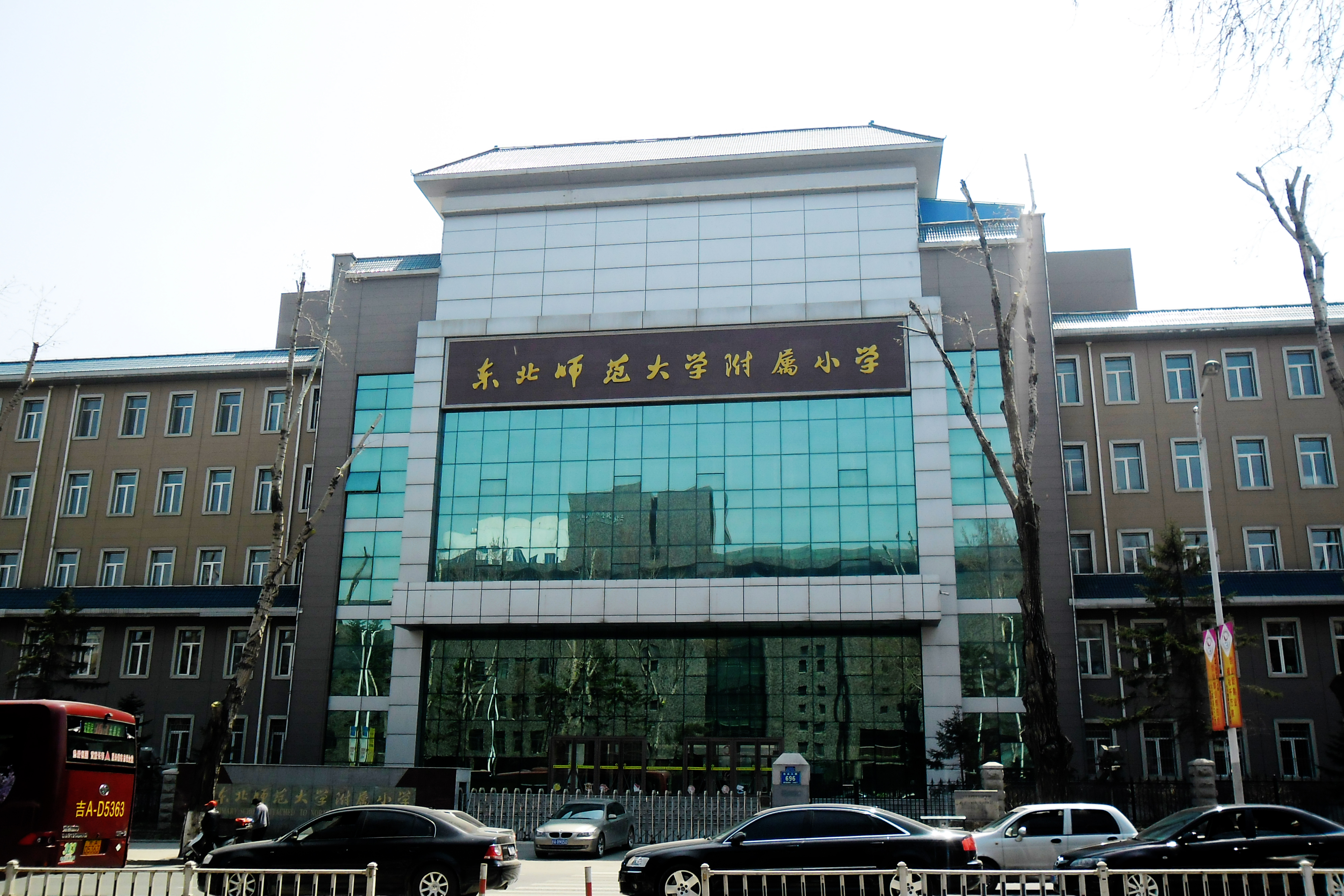
Education Ministry
696 Ziyou Rd.

Demolished in 2002; replaced by a building for the Primary School Attached to Northeast Normal University

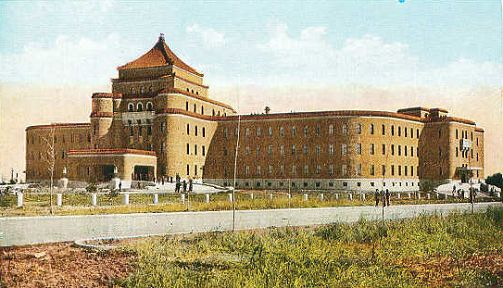

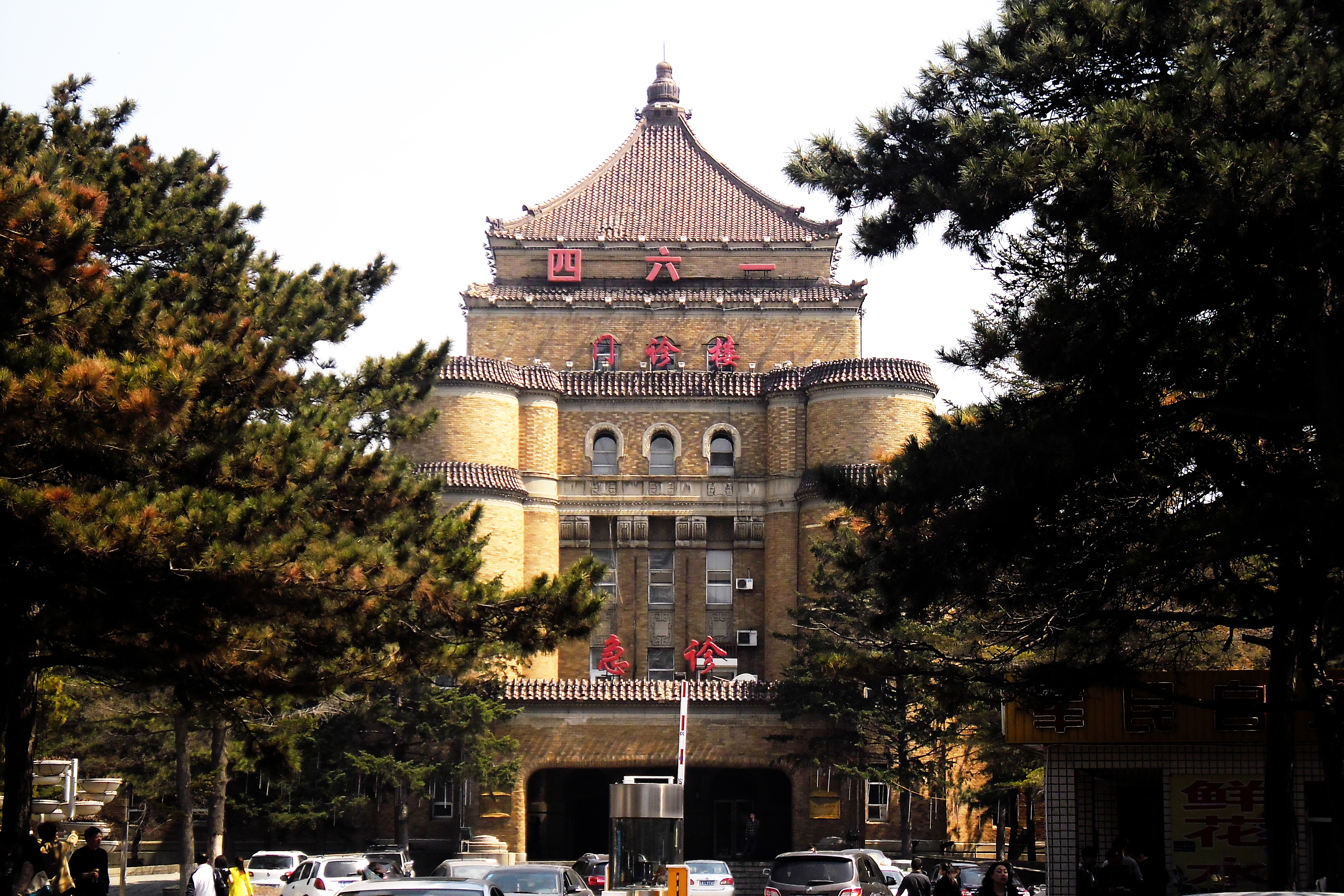
Judiciary Building (Supreme Court, Hsinking District Court and Prosecutor's Office)
108 Ziyou Rd.
1938
Japan
Masami Makino (牧野正巳)
The 461st Hospital of the PLA

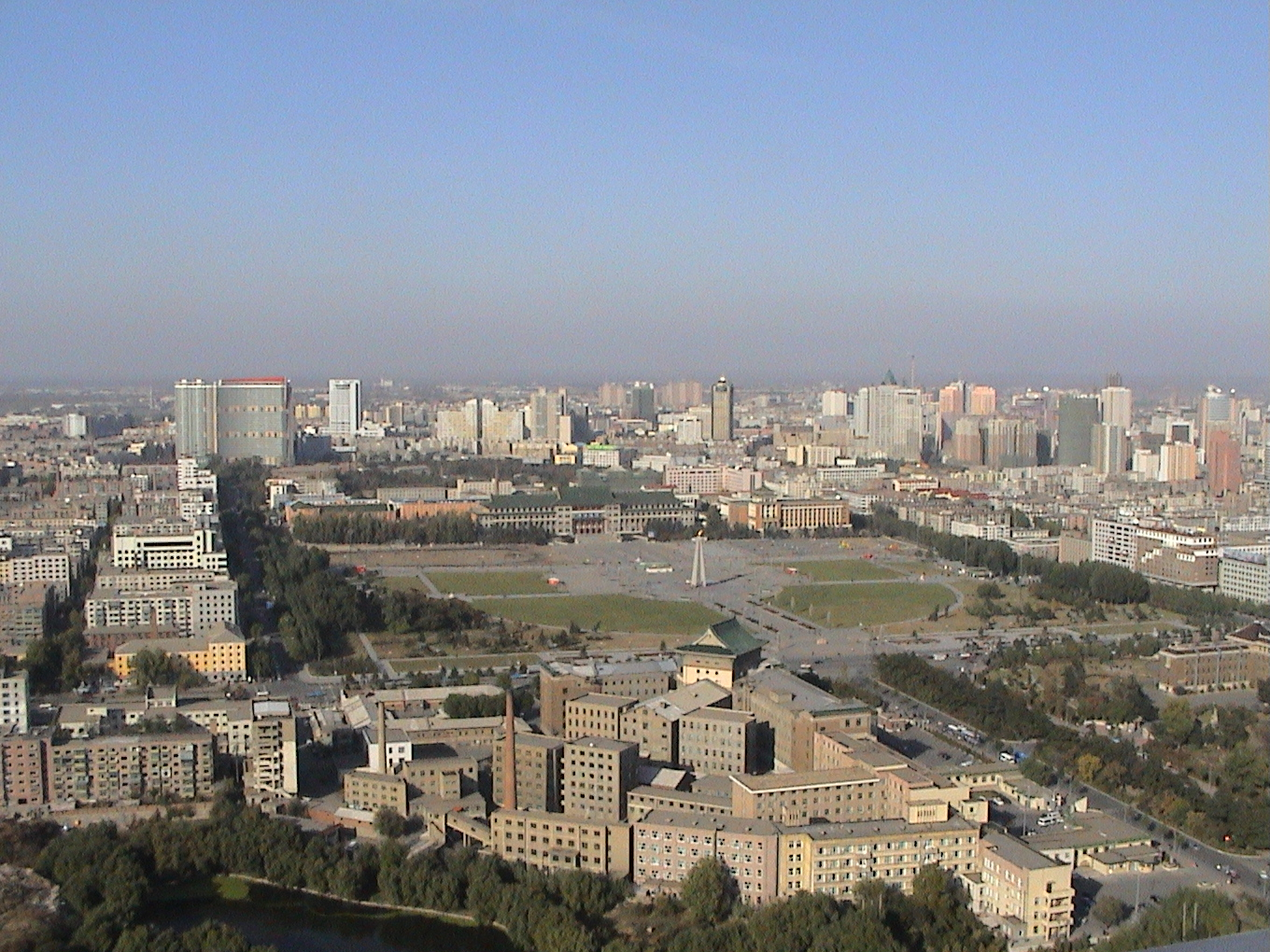
Land reserved for New Imperial Palace
Bounded by E. Minzhu St., W. Minzhu St. and Jiefang Rd.

Culture Square, Chaoyang campus of Jilin Univ. and Yuhua Park (裕华园)

== See also ==
- Manchukuo State Council
- Manchukuo
- Museum of the Imperial Palace of Manchukuo
