= Song Yuquan =

Chinese materials scientist

Song Yuquan (Chinese: 宋玉泉; 12 June 1933 – 27 July 2018) was a Chinese materials scientist with a specialization in superplasticity of metals. He was a professor at Jilin University of Technology (later merged into Jilin University), and an academician of the Chinese Academy of Sciences.

== Biography ==
Song was born on 12 June 1933 in Zhangbei County, Hebei, Republic of China. He was admitted to the Department of Physics of Peiyang University in August 1951, and transferred to Nankai University the following year during the great national reorganization of universities initiated by the Communist government.

After graduating from the Nankai University in June 1955 with a degree in physics, he was assigned to teach at Jilin University of Technology (later merged into Jilin University). He was promoted associate professor in 1980 and professor in 1985. He also served as Director of the Institute of Superplasticity and Plasticity of Jilin University. He advised a total of 81 doctoral and master's students.

Song was an expert in superplasticity of metals. He made important findings in tensile deformation of metals which won multiple national and ministerial prizes. He published 128 scientific papers and was granted more than two dozen patents in China, the United States, and other countries. His findings have been used in the construction of China's high-speed rail system. He was elected an academician of the Chinese Academy of Sciences in 1997.

Song died on 27 July 2018 in Changchun, at the age of 85.
