= Gong Weiguo =

Chinese politician

- 龚卫国

Mayor of Linxiang
- In office June 2011 – April 2015
- Party Secretary: Huang Junjun (黄俊钧)
- Succeeded by: Wang Can

Personal details
- Born: August 1972 (age 54) Yiyang, Hunan, China
- Party: Chinese Communist Party (1992–2015; expelled)
- Education: Central South University

Gong Weiguo (simplified Chinese: 龚卫国; traditional Chinese: 龔衛國; pinyin: Gōng Weìguó; born August 1972) is a former Chinese politician who spent most of his career in south China's Hunan province. He was investigated by the Chinese Communist Party's anti-graft agency in April 2015. Previously he served as the Deputy Communist Party Secretary and Mayor of Linxiang.

== Life and career ==
Gong was born in Yiyang, Hunan in August 1972. He was accepted to Central South University in June 1989 and graduated in March 1993. After graduation, he worked there. He joined the Chinese Communist Party in December 1992.

In May 1995 he was appointed as an official in the Department of Personnel of Hunan government and over a period of eight years worked his way up to the position of Deputy County Governor of Xiangyin County. He was the Head of Propaganda Department of Xiangyin County government from June 2006 to August 2007 and Secretary of Politics and Law Commission of Xiangyin County between August 2007 to October 2007.

In December 2007 he was promoted to become Vice-Mayor of Miluo, a position he held until March 2009.

He became Party Branch Secretary of Yueyang Municipal Cultural Affairs Bureau in March 2009, and served until May 2010.

In June 2011, he was appointed the Deputy Communist Party Secretary and Mayor of Linxiang, he remained in that position until April 2015, when he was placed under investigation by the Communist Party's anti-corruption agency for drug addict claims. On December 3, he was expelled from the Chinese Communist Party (CPC) and dismissed from public office. On December 29, he was detained by the Hunan Provincial People's Procuratorate.

On July 14, 2017, he was sentenced to 7 years and fined 300,000 yuan by the Yueyang Intermediate People's Court. The money and property that he had received in the form of bribes will be turned over to the national treasury.

Government offices
Preceded by ?	Mayor of Linxiang; 2011–2015	Succeeded by Wang Can
