= Jilin University =

Public university in Changchun, Jilin, China

- 吉林大学
- Motto: 求实创新 励志图强
- Motto in English: Truth · Innovation · Aspiration
- Type: National, public
- Established: 1946; 80 years ago
- Affiliations: BRICS Universities League; Double First-Class Construction; 211 Project; 985 Project
- President: Zhang Xi (张希)
- Academic staff: 6,624 (June 2019)
- Administrative staff: 15,626
- Undergraduates: 41,734 (June 2019)
- Postgraduates: 26,872 (June 2019)
- Doctoral students: 7,813 (June 2019)
- Location: Changchun, Jilin, China; 43.8800°N 125.3010°E
- Campus: 611 hectares (1,510 acres)
- Nickname: 吉大
- Website: www.jlu.edu.cn

Chinese name
- Simplified Chinese: 吉林大学
- Traditional Chinese: 吉林大學
Transcriptions
Standard Mandarin
- Hanyu Pinyin: Jílín Dàxué

Jilin University (JLU) is a public university in the city of Changchun, Jilin, China. It is affiliated with the Ministry of Education. The university is part of Project 211, Project 985, and the Double First-Class Construction.

== History ==
Founded in 1946 as the Northeast College of Administration in Harbin, Heilongjiang, Jilin University merged with many universities and colleges and changed its name many times. In May 1948, the Northeast Administration College merged with the Harbin University and was renamed Northeast Academy of Science. In November 1948, the Northeast Academy of Science moved to Shenyang, Liaoning and restored the name of Northeast Administration College. In 1950, it was renamed as Northeast People's University. During the Korean War it was relocated to Changchun, Jilin. In 1958, it was renamed Jilin University.

In 2000, Jilin University, Jilin University of Technology, Norman Bethune University of Medical Sciences, Changchun University of Science and Technology (established 1951), and Changchun Institute of Posts and Telecommunications combined to form the current Jilin University. On August 29, 2004, University of Military Logistics also merged into Jilin University.

In April 2006, an institute dedicated to projects of military interest was created within Jilin University.

== Academics ==
It is a comprehensive and national key university.

There are 6,657 faculty members in total, among which there are 2,110 professors and 1,618 doctoral advisors. There are 43 members of Chinese Academy of Sciences or Chinese Academy of Engineering (including 33 adjunct members).

== Rankings and reputation ==
University rankings
BCUR National	Domestic	26
Wu Shulian National	Domestic	15
CUAA National	Alumni	26
QS National	General	29
QS Asia (Asia version)	General	90
ARWU World	Research	101–150
QS World	General	=473
USNWR World	General	=296

As of 2024, the CWTS Leiden Ranking table 2024 ranked Jilin University at 19th in the world based on their publications for the time period 2019–2022. In 2024, it ranked 55th among the universities around the world by SCImago Institutions Rankings.

The university ranked 15th among the leading institutions globally in the Nature Index 2025 Annual Tables by Nature Research, that measure the high-quality research published in 82 high-quality science journals.

The University Ranking By Academic Performance 2024/25 ranked Jilin University at 74th globally. Jilin University ranked 194th worldwide and 42nd in Asia the Center for World University Ranking (CWUR) 2025.

== People ==
=== Notable alumni ===
- Du Qinglin - politician, vice chairman of Chinese People's Political Consultative Conference, Head of the United Front Work Department of the Central Committee.
- Hu Huaibang - chairman of China Development Bank.
- Li Congjun -former president of China's Xinhua News Agency.
- Liu Qibao - head of the Propaganda Department of the Central Committee.
- Liu Xiaobo - 2010 Nobel Peace Prize winner
- Liu Yandong - Vice Premier of the People's Republic of China
- Lü Fuyuan - first minister of the Ministry of Commerce of the People's Republic of China.
- Wang Gang (politician) -Director of the General Office of the Chinese Communist Party
- Wang Gongquan - liberal activist, main leader and financial backer of the New Citizens' Movement
- Wang Yongqing - Secretary-General of the Central Political and Legal Affairs Commission
- Wang Jiarui - Vice Chairman of the Chinese People's Political Consultative Conference, director of the International Liaison Department of the Chinese Communist Party from 2003 to 2015.
- Xu Shaoshi - former chairman of the National Development and Reform Commission of the People's Republic of China, party chief of Minister of Land and Resources
- Xu Xianming - China's leading authority on human rights law
- Yin Weimin - Minister of Human Resources and Social Security and a deputy head of the Organization Department of the Chinese Communist Party.
- Zhang Jun (politician) - Chinese politician and former judge, serving currently as the Deputy Secretary of the Central Commission for Discipline Inspection the country's top anti-corruption body, and the Minister of Justice. He formerly served as Vice Minister of the Ministry of Justice of the People's Republic of China and Vice President of the Supreme People's Court.
- Cheng Ying (oncologist) - Chinese oncologist, physician-scientist, and hospital administrator. Awarded with the Chinese Physician Award in 2009.

=== Notable faculty ===
- Andrey Baykov - Russian international relations scholar, Vice-Rector of Moscow State University of International Relations.
- Barry Buzan - Emeritus Professor at the London School of Economics, fellow of the British Academy
- Yury Gogotsi - leading Ukrainian scientist in the field of material chemistry, professor at Drexel University, founder and director of the A.J. Drexel Nanotechnology Institute
- Chen Jia'er - nuclear physicist, an accelerator physicist and an academician of the Chinese Academy of Sciences.
- Han Dayuan - President of the Chinese Constitutional Law Society in Renmin University of China
- Huai Jinpeng - computer scientist, party secretary of the China Association for Science and Technology
- Loide Kasingo - member of the South West Africa People's Organization and National Assembly of Namibia, Deputy Speaker of Parliament.
- Kai Li - professor at the department of Computer Science in Princeton University
- Li Siguang - founder of China's geomechanics, first present of former Changchun Institute of Geology (now as College of Earth Sciences, Jilin University).
- Lawrence Lau - Hong Kong economist and the former vice-chancellor of the Chinese University of Hong Kong.
- Long Yifei - Associate dean of Renmin University of China Law School
- Alan MacDiarmid - winner of Nobel Prize in Chemistry.
- Wilma Olson - professor at the BioMaPS institute for Quantitative Biology at Rutgers University, visiting professor at the Polymer Chemistry Department of Jilin University.
- Helmut Ringsdorf - polymer Chemist, known for being the first to propose covalently bonding drugs to water-soluble polymers.
- Steve Smith (academic) - international relations theorist, Vice Chancellor of the University of Exeter and Professor of International Studies.
- Song Yuquan, materials scientist, academician of the Chinese Academy of Sciences.
- Sun Weiguo - president of Xihua University
- Tang Aoqing or Au-Chin Tang, theoretical chemist, President of Jilin University, member of the Chinese Academy of Sciences
- Wang Xianghao - mathematician who introduced the Grunwald–Wang theorem, correcting an error in Wilhelm Grunwald's original statement and proof of this.
- Yevgeny Yasin - prominent Russian economist, academic supervisor at the National Research University Higher School of Economics.
- Ying Xu - computational biologist and bioinformatician, chair professor in the Institute of Bioinformatics at the University of Georgia
- You Xiaozeng -Chinese inorganic chemist, educator and an academician of the Chinese Academy of Sciences.
- Zhou Ji (Tsinghua University) - "Changjiang Scholar" distinguished Professor, at the School of Materials Science and Engineering, of Tsinghua University
- Zhou Qifeng - Chinese chemist and academician of the Chinese Academy of Sciences, President of Peking University.
- Zhu Wenxiong - Chinese linguist.
- Zhu Guangya - renowned Chinese nuclear physicist, head and first director of Jilin University Department of Physics

== Colleges, Institutions and other Affiliated Organizations ==
There are 47 colleges or schools, as well as a few institutions and other affiliated organizations within 9 divisions in Jilin University, including:

=== Division of Humanities ===
- School of Philosophy and Sociology
- College of Humanities
- School of Archaeology
- College of Foreign Languages
- Art College
- Physical Education College
- School of Foreign Languages Education

=== Division of Social Sciences ===
- School of Economics
- School of Law
- School of Public Administration
- Business School
- School of Marxism
- Northeast Asian Studies College
- School of Finance
- School of International and Public Affairs

=== Division of Sciences ===
- Mathematics School and Institute
- College of Physics
- College of Chemistry
- College of Life Sciences

=== Division of Engineering ===
- School of Mechanical and Aerospace Engineering
- College of Automotive Engineering
- School of Material Science and Engineering
- School of Transportation
- College of Biological and Agricultural Engineering
- School of Management
- College of Food Science and Engineering

=== Division of Information Sciences ===
- College of Electronic Science and Engineering
- College of Communication Engineering
- College of Computer Science and Technology
- Software Institute
- Public Computer Education and Research Center

=== Division of Earth Sciences ===
- College of Earth Sciences
- College of Geo-exploration Science and Technology
- Construction Engineering College
- College of New Energy and Environment
- College of Instrumentation and Electrical Engineering

=== Norman Bethune Health Science Center ===
- (Main Page of NBHCC)
- College of Basic Medical Science
- School of Public Health
- School of Pharmaceutical Sciences
- School of Nursing
- Clinical Medical College
- The First Bethune Hospital
- The Second Hospital Archived 2022-02-06 at the Wayback Machine
- China-Japan Union Hospital (The Third Bethune Hospital)
- Hospital of Stomatology

=== Division of Agricultural Sciences ===
- College of Veterinary Medicine
- College of Plant Science
- College of Food Science and Engineering
- Public Education Center
- College of Animal Science
- Institute of Zoonosis

=== Division of Interdisciplinary Research ===
- School of Artificial Intelligence

=== Others ===
- Applied Technology College Archived 2020-01-28 at the Wayback Machine
- College of Economical Information
- College of Business Administration
- Zhuhai College Archived 2020-02-02 at the Wayback Machine
- Dongrong College
- Lambton College

== See also ==
- Badabu - Part of the university's Xinmin Campus
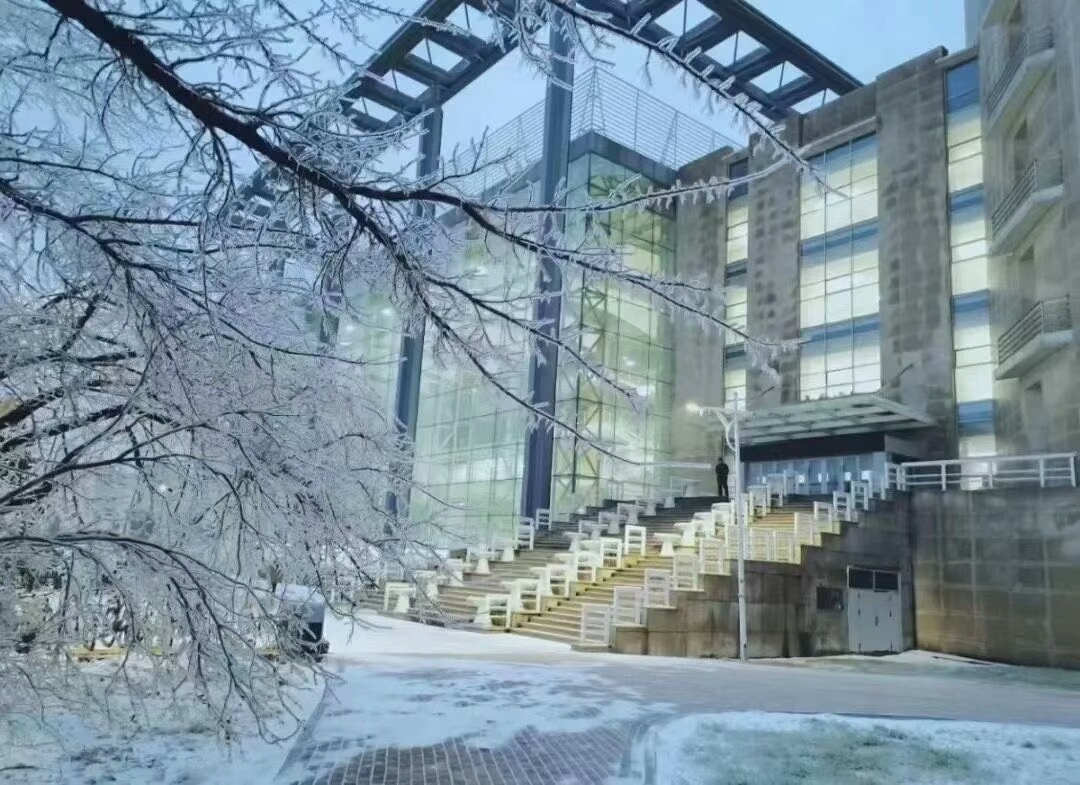
  JLU in winter
