= Pengzhou =

Pengzhou 彭州市
- County-level city
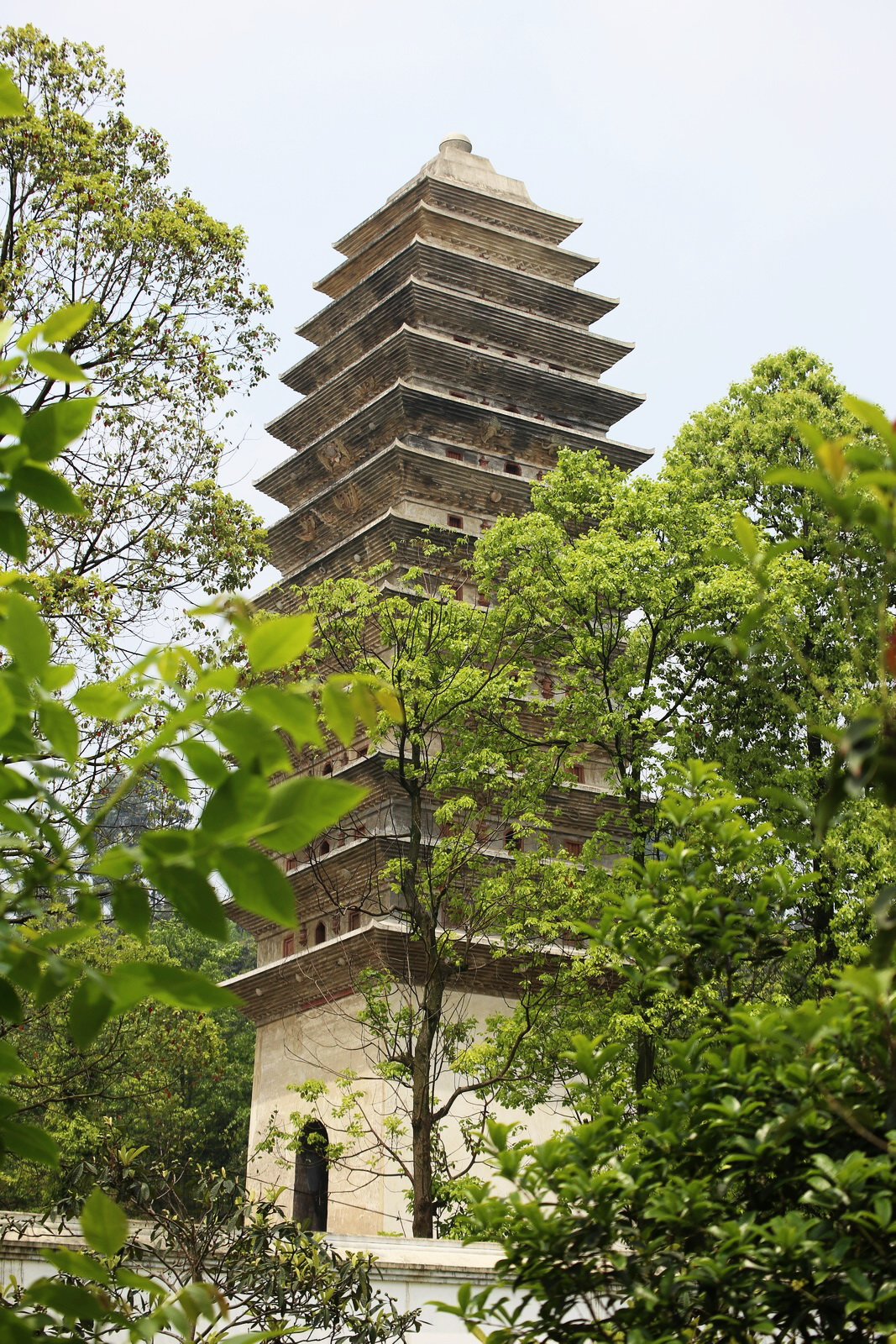
- Nickname: The Peony City (丹城)
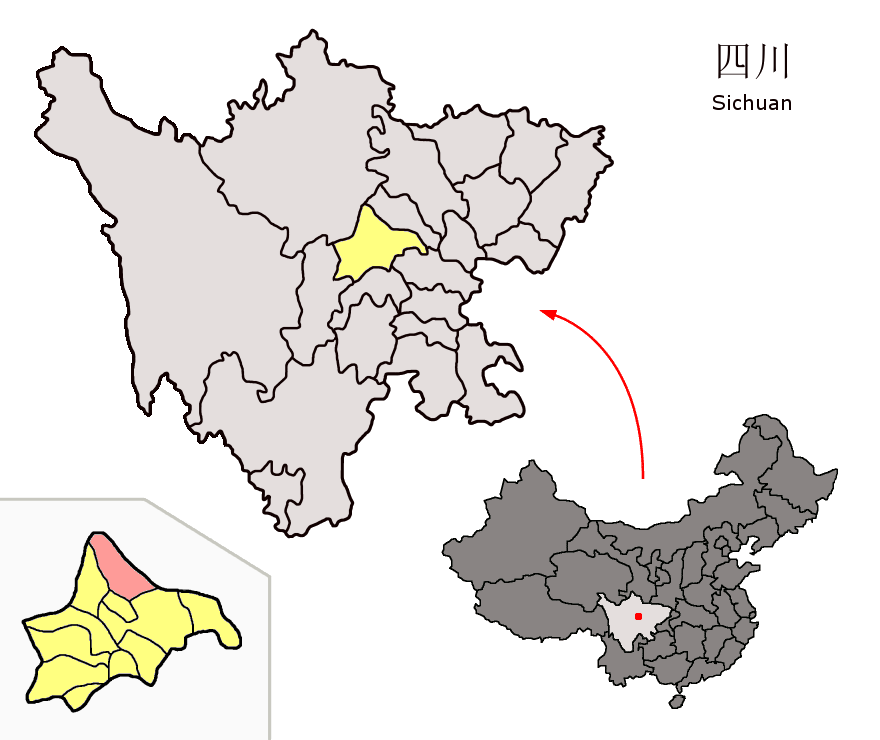
- Location of Pengzhou in Sichuan

- Location in Sichuan
- Coordinates: 30°59′28″N 103°56′35″E
- Country: China
- Province: Sichuan
- Sub-provincial city: Chengdu
- Municipal seat: No. 81, Jinpeng East Road, Tianpeng (天彭街道金彭东路81号)

Government
  - CPC Party Secretary: Wang Fengjun (王锋君)
  - Mayor: Jiang Ming (蒋明)

Area
  - Total: 1,420 km^{2} (550 sq mi)
- Highest elevation: 4,812 m (15,787 ft)

Population (2021)
  - Total: 795,900
  - Density: 537/km^{2} (1,390/sq mi)
- Time zone: UTC+8 (China Standard)
- Postal code: 611930
- Area code: 028
- GDP (nominal) Total (2009): ¥ 12.54 billion (US$1.838 billion)
- GDP (nominal) Per Capita (2009): ¥ 16,087 (US$2,357)
- Website: www.pengzhou.gov.cn

Pengzhou (Chinese: 彭州; pinyin: Péngzhōu), formerly Peng County or Pengxian, is a county-level city of Sichuan Province, Southwest China. It is under the administration of the prefecture-level city of Chengdu. There is an expressway that connects Pengzhou to Chengdu. It is bordered by the prefecture-level divisions of Deyang to the northeast and the Ngawa Tibetan and Qiang Autonomous Prefecture to the north.

It has an area of 1,420 km^{2} (550 sq mi) and At the end of 2024 and the beginning of 2025, the resident population will be 780,100, the urbanization rate will be 56.77%, the total number of registered households will be 595,400, the registered population will be 787,900, the urban population will be 279,000, and the rural population will be 508,900. Pengzhou is one of the three national bases of peony plantation and one of the five national bases of vegetable plantation and merchandise. Pengzhou's industry varies from pharmaceutical to petrochemical. The oil refinery attracts a total investment of 38 billion yuan, considered to be the biggest single investment of Sichuan Province since 1949. Like other regions around the area, Pengzhou was affected by the 2008 Sichuan earthquake.

== History ==
The Pengzhou area is believed to have been inhabited since the Western Zhou period. Empress dowager Wu Zetian first set up Pengzhou in 686 AD (Tang dynasty). In 1337 AD, Hongwu Emperor (Ming dynasty) reduced Pengzhou to Pengxian, or Peng County (彭县; Péngxiàn). Peng County later became Pengzhou City in 1993.

As of late, Pengzhou is still occasionally referred to as Pengxian, or Peng County, even in official publications.

== Administrative divisions ==
Pengzhou has 14 subdistricts and 9 towns:

subdistricts

- Tianpeng (天彭街道)
- Longfeng (隆丰街道)
- Mengyang (濛阳街道)
- Zhihe (致和街道)

towns

- Longmenshan (龙门山镇)
- Lichun (丽春镇)
- Jiuchi (九尺镇)
- Tongji (通济镇)
- Danjingshan (丹景山镇)
- Aoping (敖平镇)
- Guihua (桂花镇)
- Bailu (白鹿镇)
- Gexianshan (葛仙山镇)

== Education ==
- Xihua University Pengzhou Campus is located at the south part of the city.
- Yanxiu Primary School
- Tongji Middle School（四川省彭州市通济中学）

== Sister cities ==
- Ishikari, Hokkaidō, Japan (Since 2000)
- Tondabayashi, Osaka, Japan (Since 2002)
- Anykščiai, Lithuania
- Mataram, Indonesia, (Since 2019)

== Climate ==
The city has a monsoon influenced humid subtropical climate, with most of the rainfall occurring in the warm, humid summer. Overall, the climate is mild, but shows traits of all four seasons.

Climate data for Pengzhou, elevation 582 m (1,909 ft), (1991–2020 normals, extremes 1981–present)
Month	Jan	Feb	Mar	Apr	May	Jun	Jul	Aug	Sep	Oct	Nov	Dec	Year
Record high °C (°F)	19.4 (66.9)	22.9 (73.2)	30.7 (87.3)	31.5 (88.7)	34.3 (93.7)	35.5 (95.9)	38.2 (100.8)	38.6 (101.5)	35.2 (95.4)	29.5 (85.1)	25.4 (77.7)	17.6 (63.7)	38.6 (101.5)
Mean daily maximum °C (°F)	9.1 (48.4)	11.9 (53.4)	16.6 (61.9)	22.3 (72.1)	26.2 (79.2)	28.1 (82.6)	30.0 (86.0)	29.8 (85.6)	25.6 (78.1)	20.5 (68.9)	15.8 (60.4)	10.4 (50.7)	20.5 (68.9)
Daily mean °C (°F)	5.5 (41.9)	8.1 (46.6)	12.1 (53.8)	17.3 (63.1)	21.2 (70.2)	23.7 (74.7)	25.6 (78.1)	25.1 (77.2)	21.6 (70.9)	17.0 (62.6)	12.2 (54.0)	6.9 (44.4)	16.4 (61.5)
Mean daily minimum °C (°F)	2.8 (37.0)	5.1 (41.2)	8.7 (47.7)	13.3 (55.9)	17.2 (63.0)	20.3 (68.5)	22.1 (71.8)	21.7 (71.1)	18.9 (66.0)	14.6 (58.3)	9.6 (49.3)	4.2 (39.6)	13.2 (55.8)
Record low °C (°F)	−4.5 (23.9)	−3.5 (25.7)	−2.3 (27.9)	3.2 (37.8)	6.3 (43.3)	13.9 (57.0)	15.7 (60.3)	15.9 (60.6)	12.4 (54.3)	2.8 (37.0)	0.0 (32.0)	−4.6 (23.7)	−4.6 (23.7)
Average precipitation mm (inches)	7.0 (0.28)	9.6 (0.38)	23.4 (0.92)	47.6 (1.87)	69.3 (2.73)	106.5 (4.19)	212.2 (8.35)	226.8 (8.93)	118.0 (4.65)	44.0 (1.73)	15.5 (0.61)	5.5 (0.22)	885.4 (34.86)
Average precipitation days (≥ 0.1 mm)	6.9	7.7	11.8	13.1	14.4	15.4	15.6	15.4	16.5	15.4	7.9	5.5	145.6
Average snowy days	1.5	0.6	0	0	0	0	0	0	0	0	0	0.3	2.4
Average relative humidity (%)	78	75	74	73	71	77	81	80	81	82	79	79	78
Mean monthly sunshine hours	59.2	58.7	86.3	116.5	122.6	112.3	131.4	140.6	70.3	55.3	63.1	59.8	1,076.1
Percentage possible sunshine	18	19	23	30	29	26	31	35	19	16	20	19	24
Source: China Meteorological Administration all-time extreme temperature all-time January highall-time July high
