= Xihua University =

Provincial public university in Chengdu, Sichuan, China

Coordinates: 30.77848°N 103.9611°E

- 西华大学
- Motto: 求是 明德 卓越
- Motto in English: Diligence Virtue Excellence
- Type: Public university
- Established: 1960; 66 years ago
- Academic affiliations: Double First Class University Plan (Provincial), Basic Capacity Building Project For Colleges and Universities in Central and Western China
- Chairman: Qingyou Liu (刘清友）
- President: Huimin Bian (边慧敏）
- Vice-president: Xiaolin Wang
- Students: 45,000
- Location: Chengdu, Sichuan, China
- Colors: Green
- Website: www.xhu.edu.cn

Xihua University (XHU; Chinese: 西华大学) is a provincial public university in Chengdu, Sichuan, China. It is affiliated with the Sichuan Provincial People's Government.

== Foundation ==
XHU was founded on April 16, 2003 when Sichuan University of Science and Technology (Chinese: 四川工业学院) and the Teacher's College merged. The Sichuan University of Science and Technology, previously called the Sichuan Mechanical College of Agriculture (Chinese: 四川农业机械学院), was founded in 1960. The former Teacher's College, located in Peng Zhou County, was founded in 1971.

== Location ==
Xihua University covers about 2,850 mu (469.5 acres) in the hi-tech zone of Chengdu. The campus has a tributary of the Ming Jiang River and the Ancient Irrigation Project—Du Jiangyan, and its national scenery zone is to the west.

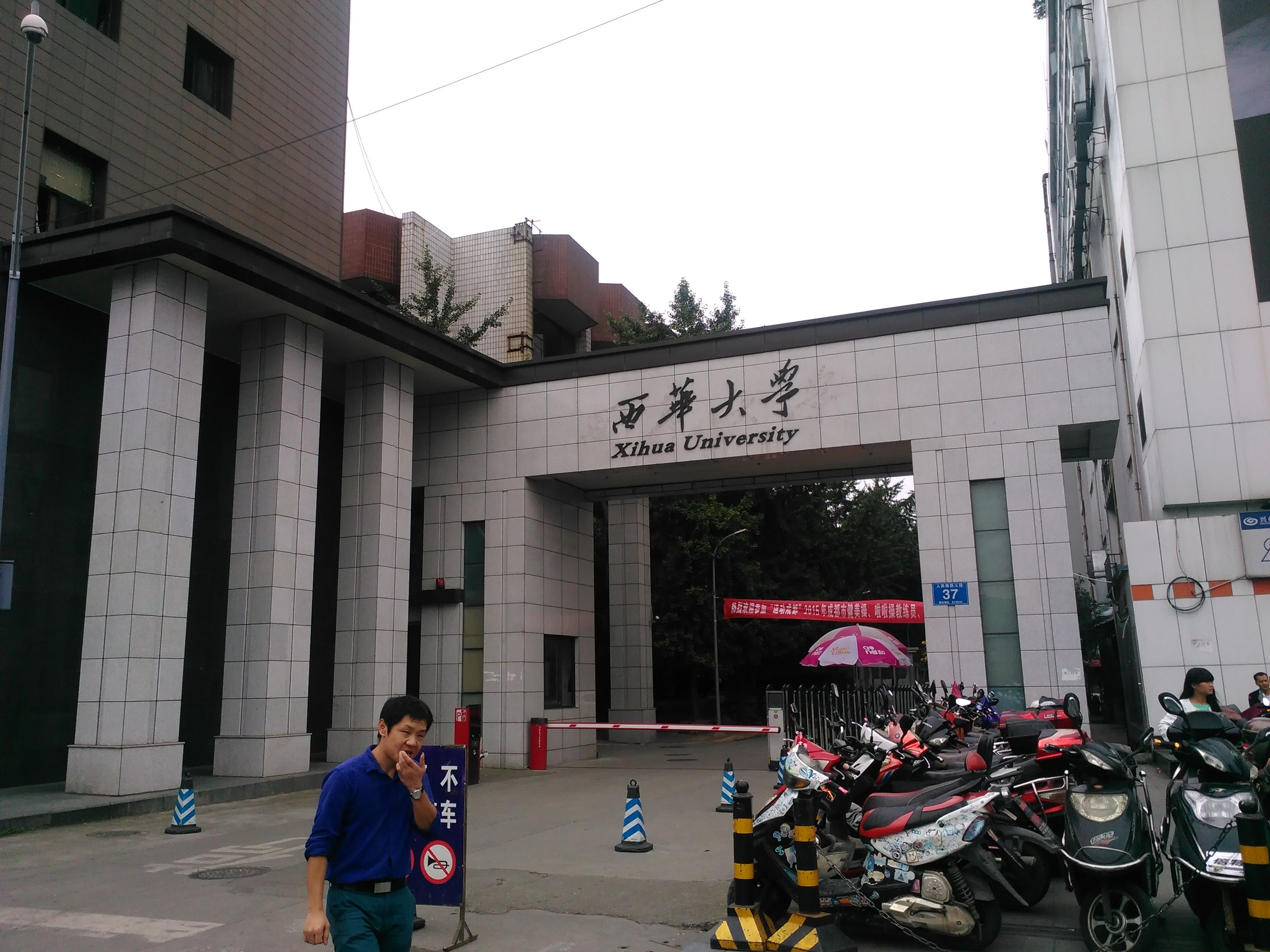
Xihua University campus entrance

== Resources ==
XHU as of December 2011 has 1,400 teachers and staff members, among whom 380 teachers have the title of senior post.
