= History of canals in China =

Chinese canal network
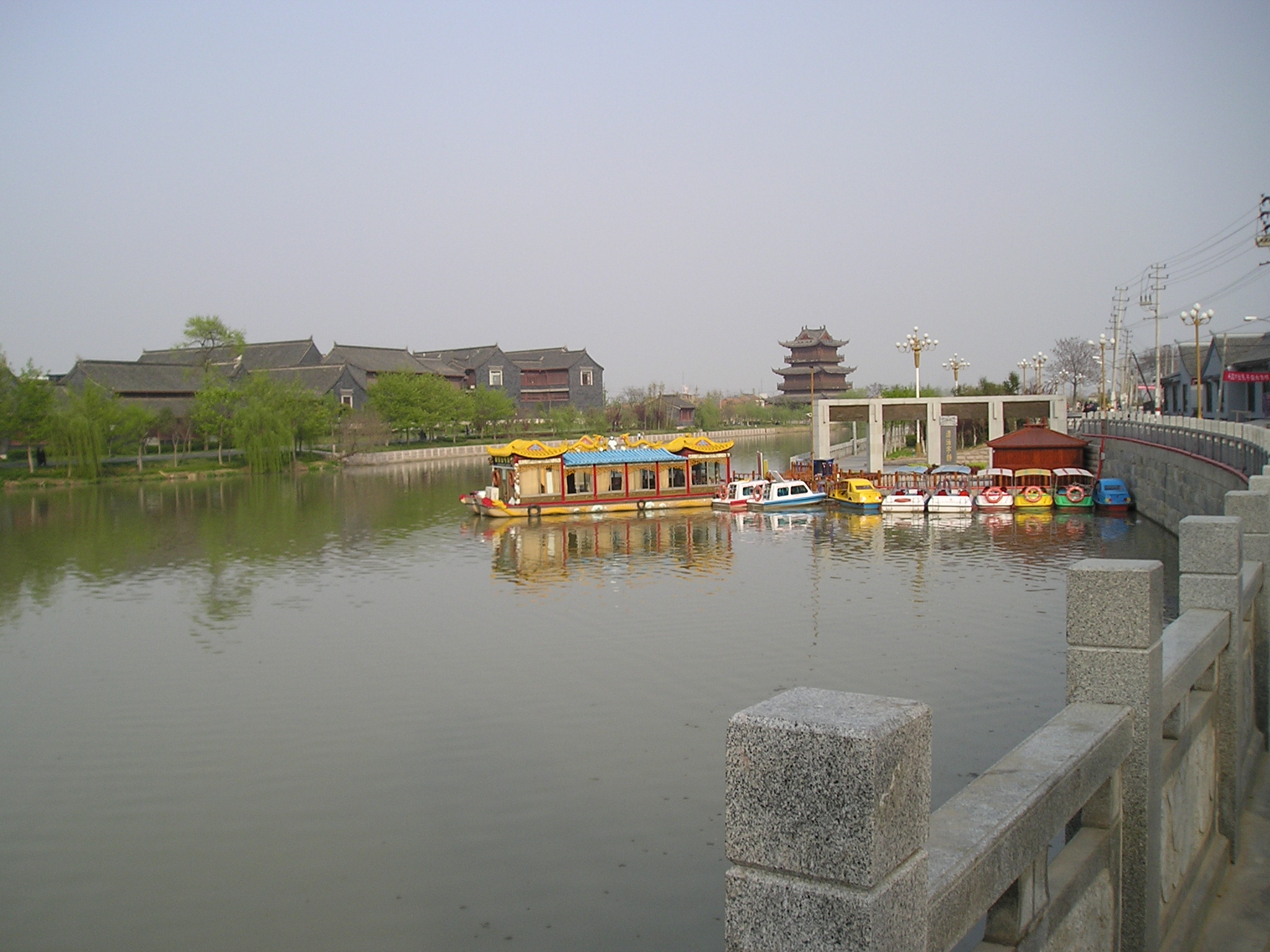
- The canal at Qingjiangpu (清江浦) in Jiangsu Province
- Traditional Chinese: 漕運系統
- Simplified Chinese: 漕运系统
- Literal meaning: Canal Transport System
Transcriptions
Standard Mandarin
- Hanyu Pinyin: Cáoyùn Xìtǒng
- Wade–Giles: Ts‘ao-yün Hsi-t‘ung

The history of canals in China connecting its major rivers and centers of agriculture and population extends from the legendary exploits of Yu the Great in his attempts to control the flooding of the Yellow River to the present infrastructure projects of the People's Republic of China. From the Spring and Autumn period (8th–5th centuries BCE) onward, the canals of China were used for army transportation and supply, as well as colonization of new territories. From the Qin (3rd century BCE) to the Qing (17th–20th centuries CE), China's canal network was also essential to imperial taxation-in-kind. Control of shipbuilding and internal tariffs were also administered along the canals.

== History ==
=== Ancient China ===
The main logistics chains of ancient China were along the natural rivers of the country. One major example was the occasion when the state of Jin suffered a severe crop failure in 647 BCE and the Mu Duke of Qin provided several thousand tons of grain by barges. These traveled from his capital at Yong (雍) in present-day Fengxiang, Shaanxi, along the Wei, Yellow, and Fen Rivers to the Jin capital at Jiang (t 絳, s 绛) in Yicheng, Shanxi.

Since China's rivers generally run from the western highlands to the Yellow and East China Seas, all parallel to one another, there was great incentive to connect the river systems by canals. The canals also assisted flood control. The oldest known was probably the Hong or Honggou Canal (t 鴻溝, s 鸿沟, Hónggōu, "Canal of the Wild Geese"), which linked the Yellow River near present-day Kaifeng to the Si and Bian Rivers. Details of its construction have been lost, with it first appearing in the historical record in Su Qin's discussion of state boundaries in 330 BCE and Sima Qian placing its construction just after his discussion of the supposed works of Yu the Great. Modern scholars now usually place its construction in the 6th century BCE.

In 486 BCE, men under King Fuchai of Wu constructed the Han or Hangou Canal (t 邗溝, s 邗沟, Hángōu) to connect the Yangtze River through the Fanliang (樊梁湖, Fánliáng Hú), Bozhi (博芝湖, Bózhī Hú) and Sheyang Lakes (t 射陽湖, s 射阳湖, Shèyáng Hú) with the Huai. By way of the Honggou, this then connected to the Yellow River and its networks beyond. This eased Wu's supply lines during Fuchai's war with Qi, which was concluded successfully at the Battle of Ailing, solidifying Fuchai's position as hegemon over the other states of his time. During 483 and 482 BCE, Fuchai's men then built the Heshui Canal (t 荷水運河, s 荷水运河, Héshuǐ Yùnhé) connecting the Si with the Ji, which ran parallel to the Yellow River through densely populated districts in what is now western Shandong.

=== Qin dynasty ===
In 214 BCE the first Chinese Emperor Qin Shi Huang ordered the construction of a canal connecting the Xiang River and the Lijiang in order to supply his troops for an attack on the Xiongnu nomads. Designed by Shi Lu (史祿), the resulting Lingqu Canal is the oldest contour canal in the world. This canal along with the Zhengguo Canal in Shaanxi Province and the Dujiangyan Irrigation System in Sichuan Province are known as “The three great hydraulic engineering projects of the Qin dynasty”.

=== Han dynasty ===
During the Chu–Han Contention (206–202 BCE), General Xiao He used the Wei River to transport provisions for his army, thereby creating an effective logistics supply network. In 129 BCE, the sixth year of Emperor Wu, a canal was cut through the northern foothills of the Qin Mountains running parallel to the Wei River linking Tong Pass with Chang’an and greatly reducing the amount of time needed to transport goods between the two cities.

=== Sui and Tang dynasties ===
Although the Sui dynasty lasted only 37 years from 581 until 618, its rulers made a major contribution to improving the canal system. The Grand Canal became a major factor in economic growth and political unity by connecting north and south, allowing transport of tax grain and control of the sale of salt. The Hai, Yellow, Huai, Yangtze and Qiantang Rivers were all interlinked through the construction of canals thus laying the groundwork for further development during later dynasties. These were the Guangtong Canal (廣通渠), Tongji Canal (通濟渠), Shanyang Channel (山陽瀆) and Yongji Canal (永濟渠) which formed the basis of a large scale canal based transport network.
At the time of Emperor Jingzong of Tang (r. 824–827) the canal system had become too shallow. This restricted the movement of salt and iron which were important government monopolies so to solve the problem seven rivers were diverted to the east.

=== Song dynasty ===
During the Song dynasty the capital Daliang (大梁), modern day Kaifeng, used the Bian Yellow, Huimin (惠民河) and Guangji (广济河) Rivers as part of the canal network. In 976 CE during the reign of Emperor Taizong of Song more than 55 million bushels of grain were moved along the Bian River to the capital. By the time of Emperor Renzong of Song (r. 1022–1063) the amount had increased to 80 million bushels.

=== Yuan dynasty ===
The Yuan Dynasty saw the establishment of a government body in the form of a "Si" (司) near the capital to oversee the canal system. Known as the Huai & Yangtze Rivers Grain Transport Office, (江淮都漕运司) this was an offshoot of the Three Departments and Six Ministries of the administrative third grade or "San Pin" (三品). This office was responsible for arranging grain transportation to the Luan River (滦河) then onwards to the capital at Dadu (modern day Beijing) using more than 3,000 boats. Sea-based transportation within the grain taxation system was also important with canals playing a subsidiary role.

=== Ming dynasty ===
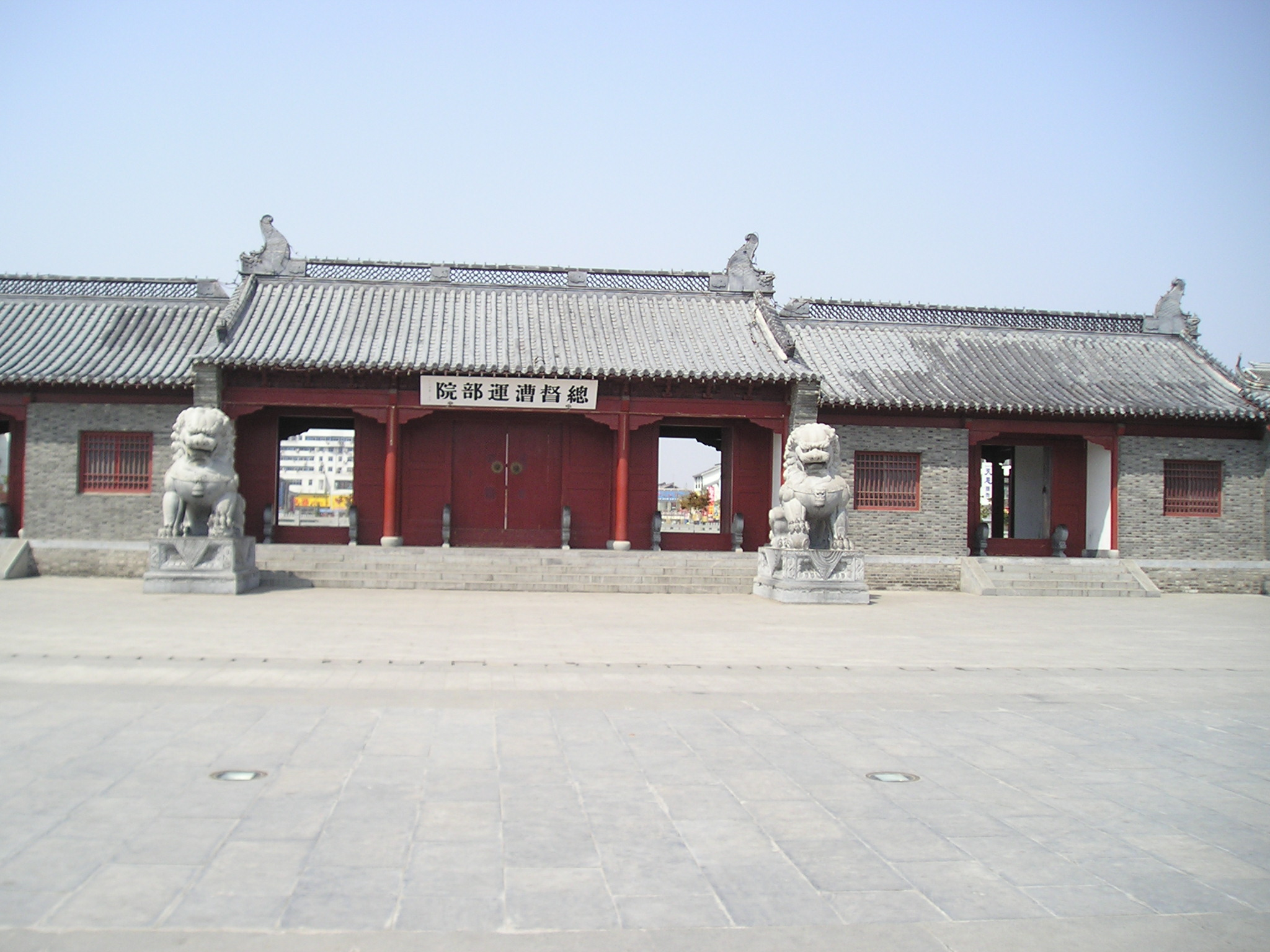
Former yamen of the canal system's governor-general at Huai'an, Jiangsu Province.

In 1368, the first year of the reign of the Ming Hongwu Emperor, the Capital Grain Transport Office (京畿都漕运司) was established under the auspices of a fourth grade (四品) commissioner. At the same time, the canal system's governor-general's office was set up in the prefectural capital of Huai'an, Jiangsu Province. Its responsibilities were to manage the canal network and ensure that annual grain shipments remained at around 40 million tons. Boatyards were also established in Anqing, Suzhou, Hangzhou, Jiujiang, Zhangshu and Raozhou (饶州) (modern day Poyang County). At Huai'an, a boatyard 15 km (9.3 mi) northwest of the Yangtze River ran for a distance of 23 Chinese miles (c. 11.5 km (7.1 mi). Overall responsibility for all these locations lay with a department of the Ministry of Works. Every year, regulations fixed the total amount of tax payable by the entire country in grain via the canal system at 29.5 million bushels. Of this, 12 million bushels were allocated to local governments, 8 million bushels supported the army on the northern border, 1.2 million bushels went to the capital in Nanjing whilst 8.2 million bushels were used to supply Beijing.

From 1415 onwards, imperial regulations stated that the grain taxation system should use only the country's canal network; thereafter all seaborne transportation stopped. This situation remained virtually unchanged until the beginning of the 19th century and as a result, during both the Ming and Qing Dynasties, the volume of the grain tax transported via the Grand Canal far exceeded that of the preceding Yuan Dynasty.

During the Ming dynasty the usage pattern of the canal system went through three successive phases. At first the "zhiyun" (支运) variant evolved as grain tax transportation switched from the sea to the country's canal and river network. At Huai’an, Xuzhou, Linqing and other locations, warehouses were established to store taxes paid in grain and delivered by the local population. This was then shipped north to provision the army once every quarter. Storage became unnecessary with the advent of the "duiyun" (兑运) form where taxes paid by the common people were partly used to directly pay the transportation fees for army supplies on the journey north. During the third stage known as "changyun" (长运) or "gaidui" (改兌), the army took responsibility for the movement of grain from south of the Yangtze River.

According to Ming dynasty scholar Qiu Jun (邱濬): “Use of the river and canal network saved 30–40% of costs compared to road transportation whereas the savings achieved using sea-borne transport were 70%–80%.”

Ming dynasty Provincial Quotas for Grain Taxes
Administrative Area	Subdivision	Amount (bushels 石)
Zhejiang		630,000
Jiangxi		570,000
Hebei		380,000
Shandong		375,000
Huguang		250,000
Southern Zhili		1,794,400
	Suzhou	697000
	Songjiang (松江府)	232,950
	Changzhou	175,000
	Nanjing (应天府)	128,000
	Huai'an	104,000
	Zhenjiang	102,000
	Yangzhou	97,000
	Anqing	60,000
	Fengyang	60,000
	Xuzhou	48,000
	Ningguo	30,000
	Chizhou	25,000
	Taiping	17,000
	Luzhou	10,000
	Guangde	8,000

=== Qing dynasty ===
Although the Qing dynasty continued to use the existing canal system it had numerous disadvantages and caused the government many headaches. In 1825 during the reign of the Daoguang Emperor a maritime shipping office was established in Shanghai with a grain tax receiving station at Tianjin. Qishan and other senior ministers thereafter managed the first grain shipments by sea. Operations in Tianjin quickly grew to outstrip those based in Linqing, Shandong Province. Before the First Opium War of 1839–42 and the Second Opium War (1856–60), yearly grain-tax maritime shipments reached around 4 million bushels of grain per annum.

A series of events towards the end of the Qing dynasty led to the ultimate decline of the canal system:

- On the 21 July 1842, during the later stages of the First Opium War, British troops attacked and occupied Zhenjiang near the confluence of the Grand Canal and Yangtze River, effectively blocking operation of the canal system and its grain taxes. As a result, the Qing Daoguang Emperor decided to sue for peace and agreed to sign the Treaty of Nanking which brought hostilities to an end.
- The Taiping Rebellion of 1850–64 resulted in the loss of Nanjing and the Anhui segment of the Yangtze River for ten years from 1853 onwards thereby curtailing the canal network. During the war with the rebels, major canal side towns including Yangzhou, Qingjiangpu (清江浦), Linqing, Suzhou and Hangzhou suffered serious damage or were razed to the ground.
- After the Yellow River changed course in its floods between 1851 and 1855, the canals in the Shandong region gradually silted up. Thereafter, the principal routes for grain shipment were maritime.
- In 1872, an office to promote investment in steamships was established in Shanghai when steamships became the official vessels used within the grain-tax system.
- All canal-based traffic of the grain tax ceased in 1901.
- The post of canal system's governor-general was abolished in 1904
- 1911 saw the opening of the Jinpu railway linking Tianjin and Zhenjiang such that the importance of the Grand Canal and the towns along its banks significantly dropped.

=== People's Republic ===
A diagram of the Red Flag Canal near the Canal Visitor Center

During the Great Leap Forward, the Red Flag Canal was built entirely by hand as an irrigation canal diverting water from the Zhang River to fields in Linzhou in northern Henan. Completed in 1965, the main channel is 71 kilometers (44 mi) long, winding around the side of a cliff and through 42 tunnels. It was celebrated within China and was the subject of several movies, including a section of Michelangelo Antonioni's 1972 documentary Chung Kuo.

The South–North Water Transfer Project is still ongoing, with the central route completed in 2014.
