= Guangwu (disambiguation) =

Guangwu was the posthumous name of Liu Xiu (5 BCE–47), first emperor of the Eastern Han dynasty in China.

Guangwu may also refer to:

== People ==
- Duke Guangwu of Qin (秦廣武公; 846–898), formal title of Wang Chao, Chinese warlord in the Tang dynasty
- Lord of Guangwu (廣武君), Li Zuoju, advisor to Chen Yu before the Battle of Jingxing
- Marquis of Guangwu (廣武侯), title given to Jin dynasty official Zhang Hua (232–300)
- Prince of Guangwu (廣武王), also known as Li Chenghong, imperial prince of the Chinese Tang dynasty

== Places ==
- Guangwu County (廣武縣), an earlier name of Dai County, Shanxi, China
- Guangwu Expressway (廣梧高速公路), a highway in China in Guangdong and Guangxi
- Guangwu Great Wall (广武长城), a section of the Great Wall of China in Shanyin County, Shanxi
- Guangwu railway station, a station along the Chinese Zhengzhou–Jiaozuo intercity railway
- Guangwu Subdistrict (光武街道), a subdistrict of Xiangcheng City in Zhoukou, Henan Province, China
- Guangwu Subdistrict, Nanyang, Henan (光武街道), a subdistrict of the Wolong District of Nanyang, Henan Province, China
- Guangwu, Xingyang (广武镇), a town in the Xingyang District of Zhengzhou, Henan Province, China
- Guangwu, an administrative division of Jiaoxi Township, Yilan County, Taiwan
- Guāngwǔ Town (光武镇), a town in Jieshou, Anhui Province, China
- Mount Guangwu (光雾山), type locality for the frog Odorrana kuangwuensis in Nanjiang County, Sechuan Province, China
