= Yu Shan (actress) =

Chinese actress (1908–1968)

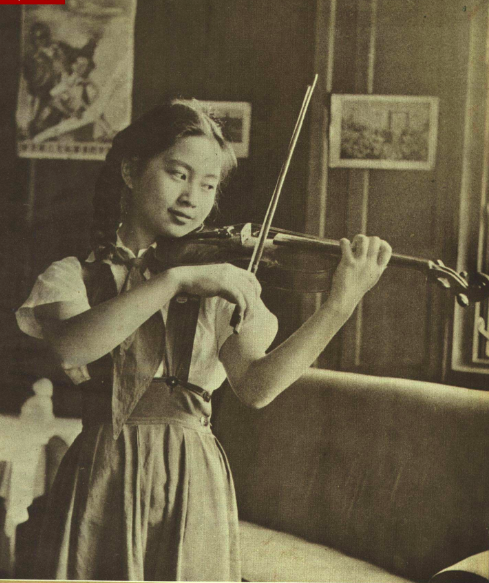
Young Yu Shan on China Pictorial from 1952

Yu Shan (俞珊, 1908 - 1968) was a Chinese actress and one of the earliest drama actors in China.

== Life ==
Yu Shan was born in 1908, in Shanyin, Zhejiang Province (present-day Shaoxing, Zhejiang Province), to the prominent Shanyin Yu family. Her father, Yu Dachun, was a government official in the Republic of China. Her grandfather, Yu Mingzhen, was a late Qing Dynasty Hanlin academic who served as supervisor of the Jiangnan Naval Academy. Her first cousin once removed (Dachun's first cousin), Yu Ta-wei, was a politician in the Republic of China.

She started her education at the Nankai Girls' High School in Tianjin. She also studied at the Shanghai Conservatory of Music and was invited by Tian Han, Chinese playwright, to join the South China Society in 1929, where she soon rose to fame playing the lead role in Oscar Wilde's play Salome. The next year, she starred in Tian Han's adaptation of Georges Bizet's Carmen. Her performance of Salome was widely published in leading magazines including in Southland Monthly. Her considerable “physical allure” was described by a magazine as a “peerless beauty.” She is also remembered for her association with “prominent male cultural figures” in China including Tian Han, Zhao Taimou, Xu Zhimo, Wen Yiduo, and Liang Shiqiu.

In December 1933, Yu married educator Zhao Taimou, one of the advocates of the National Drama Movement and a member of the Preparatory Committee of Qingdao University. However, the two later divorced.

In 1948, Yu Shan defected to the Communist-controlled area in North China. After the founding of the People's Republic of China, she worked for the Jiangsu Peking Opera Troupe and the Chinese Academy of Opera Studies.

Her sister, Yu Jin, was a medical doctor. Drawing on her popularity, Huang Jing (1912–1958), one of her brothers, did “some political organization work in theatrical circles” in Shanghai. Yu died in 1968 during the Cultural Revolution.
