= Juye County =

Juye County 巨野县 Kuyeh
- County
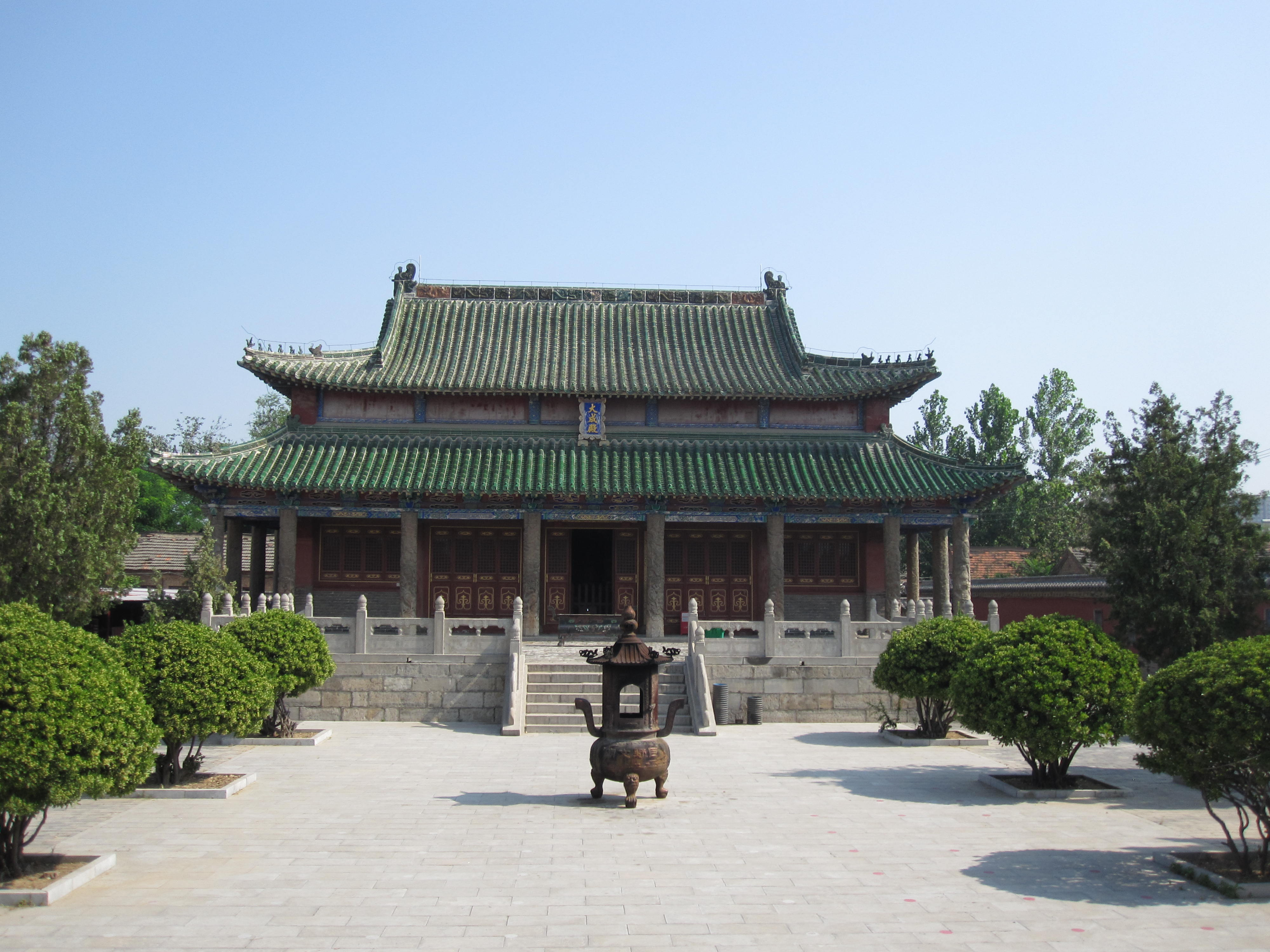

- Location of the seat in Shandong
- Coordinates: 35°23′N 116°05′E
- Country: People's Republic of China
- Province: Shandong
- Prefecture-level city: Heze

Area
  - Total: 1,308 km^{2} (505 sq mi)

Population (2019)
  - Total: 931,100
  - Density: 711.9/km^{2} (1,844/sq mi)
- Time zone: UTC+8 (China Standard)
- Postal Code: 274900

Juye County
- Traditional Chinese: 鉅野
- Simplified Chinese: 巨野
- Postal: Kuyeh
- Literal meaning: Great Plain(s)
Transcriptions
Standard Mandarin
- Hanyu Pinyin: Jùyě
- Wade–Giles: Chü-yeh

Juye is a county in western Shandong province which is under the administration of Heze City. The county is 1,303 square km in area and has a population of approximately 910,000.

== History ==
=== Early history ===
Juye was originally the name of the surrounding plain, originally territory of Huxi Prefecture. Fertile and densely populated, it was subject to repeated inundations when the Yellow River flowed nearby and burst its surrounding dykes.

=== Qing Dynasty & Republic of China ===
Juye was the site of the "Juye Incident" on November 1, 1897. The murder of Christian missionaries was used by the German Empire as an excuse to occupy Jiaozhou Bay.

=== People's Republic of China ===
From 1949 to 1952 Huxi Prefecture (Juye and the other county-level parts) was under the provincial administration of Pingyuan.

In April 1953 Huxi was dismantled and its parts shared out. Juye then came into its present municipal region of Heze.

== Administrative divisions ==
As of 2012, this County is divided to 2 subdistricts and 15 towns.

Subdistricts

- Fenghuang Subdistrict (凤凰街道)
- Yongfeng Subdistrict (永丰街道)

Towns

- Longgu (龙固镇)
- Dayi (大义镇)
- Liulin (柳林镇)
- Zhangfeng (章缝镇)
- Daxieji (大谢集镇)
- Dushan (独山镇)
- Qilin (麒麟镇)
- Hetaoyuan (核桃园镇)
- Tianzhuang (田庄镇)
- Taiping (太平镇)
- Wanfeng (万丰镇)
- Taomiao (陶庙镇)
- Dongguantun (董官屯镇)
- Tianqiao (田桥镇)
- Yingli (营里镇)

== Climate ==
Climate data for Juye, elevation 41 m (135 ft), (1991–2020 normals, extremes 1981–present)
Month	Jan	Feb	Mar	Apr	May	Jun	Jul	Aug	Sep	Oct	Nov	Dec	Year
Record high °C (°F)	17.9 (64.2)	24.8 (76.6)	28.4 (83.1)	32.5 (90.5)	38.7 (101.7)	39.9 (103.8)	41.6 (106.9)	37.5 (99.5)	35.9 (96.6)	34.8 (94.6)	26.8 (80.2)	20.1 (68.2)	41.6 (106.9)
Mean daily maximum °C (°F)	4.7 (40.5)	8.7 (47.7)	14.8 (58.6)	21.2 (70.2)	26.6 (79.9)	31.3 (88.3)	31.9 (89.4)	30.5 (86.9)	27.0 (80.6)	21.5 (70.7)	13.4 (56.1)	6.5 (43.7)	19.8 (67.7)
Daily mean °C (°F)	−0.7 (30.7)	2.9 (37.2)	8.8 (47.8)	15.1 (59.2)	20.7 (69.3)	25.5 (77.9)	27.2 (81.0)	25.7 (78.3)	21.2 (70.2)	15.2 (59.4)	7.6 (45.7)	1.2 (34.2)	14.2 (57.6)
Mean daily minimum °C (°F)	−4.6 (23.7)	−1.4 (29.5)	3.7 (38.7)	9.6 (49.3)	15.1 (59.2)	20.2 (68.4)	23.3 (73.9)	22.1 (71.8)	16.7 (62.1)	10.2 (50.4)	3.1 (37.6)	−2.7 (27.1)	9.6 (49.3)
Record low °C (°F)	−17.0 (1.4)	−17.2 (1.0)	−7.5 (18.5)	−1.7 (28.9)	4.5 (40.1)	11.3 (52.3)	17.0 (62.6)	10.9 (51.6)	4.9 (40.8)	−1.4 (29.5)	−10.6 (12.9)	−14.0 (6.8)	−17.2 (1.0)
Average precipitation mm (inches)	7.2 (0.28)	12.9 (0.51)	16.7 (0.66)	33.5 (1.32)	52.0 (2.05)	68.6 (2.70)	171.7 (6.76)	151.3 (5.96)	62.2 (2.45)	33.3 (1.31)	29.1 (1.15)	8.6 (0.34)	647.1 (25.49)
Average precipitation days (≥ 0.1 mm)	3.0	3.5	4.2	5.3	6.7	8.2	11.1	10.5	7.1	5.3	5.0	3.2	73.1
Average snowy days	2.9	2.2	0.6	0.2	0	0	0	0	0	0	0.7	1.7	8.3
Average relative humidity (%)	67	63	59	64	67	66	79	84	78	71	71	70	70
Mean monthly sunshine hours	143.5	151.9	198.4	221.2	238.9	215.7	190.5	181.0	174.0	175.8	152.5	143.1	2,186.5
Percentage possible sunshine	46	49	53	56	55	50	43	44	47	51	50	47	49
Source: China Meteorological Administration all-time January high
