= Yang Gui =

Chinese politician

- Traditional Chinese: 楊貴
- Simplified Chinese: 杨贵
Transcriptions
Standard Mandarin
- Hanyu Pinyin: Yáng Guì
- Wade–Giles: Yang Kui
- IPA: [jáŋ kwêɪ]

Yang Haiyu
- Traditional Chinese: 楊海玉
- Simplified Chinese: 杨海玉
Transcriptions
Standard Mandarin
- Hanyu Pinyin: Yáng Hǎiyù
- Wade–Giles: Yang Hai-yü
- IPA: [jáŋ xàɪ.ŷ]

Yang Gui (28 May 1928 – 10 April 2018) was a Chinese politician who served as Chinese Communist Party Committee Secretary of Lin County (now Linzhou City) in Henan Province. During his tenure he designed and oversaw the construction of the Red Flag Canal from 1960 to 1969, a major irrigation project considered by Premier Zhou Enlai as one of the two "miracles" of the People's Republic of China. He is called one of the three most beloved county secretaries in Henan, together with Jiao Yulu of Lankao and Zheng Yonghe of Huixian.

== Early life and career ==
Yang was born on 28 May 1928 in Ji County (now Weihui City), Henan province as Yang Haiyu. During the Second Sino-Japanese War, he joined the Communist guerrillas at the age of 14 and became a member of the Chinese Communist Party the next year. He fought in the Chinese Civil War and was wounded in battle in July 1947.

After the founding of the People's Republic of China in 1949, Yang worked as a party official in Ji county and Tangyin county. In the summer of 1953, when the Chinese Communist Party Committee Secretary of Lin County was hospitalized, the prefectural government of Anyang sent Yang to assist the Lin County party committee. He was appointed as the county's party secretary in May 1954, and promoted to First Secretary of the county in 1958. Lin's achievement was endorsed by the senior committees, thus Yang was invited to have a speech at a national forum for discussion about production in mountainous areas, in November 1957, Beijing. He made reference to the local endemic esophageal cancer, which evoked Beijing's attention. Premier Zhou Enlai then requested a medical team to go to Lin County.

== Construction of the Red Flag Canal ==
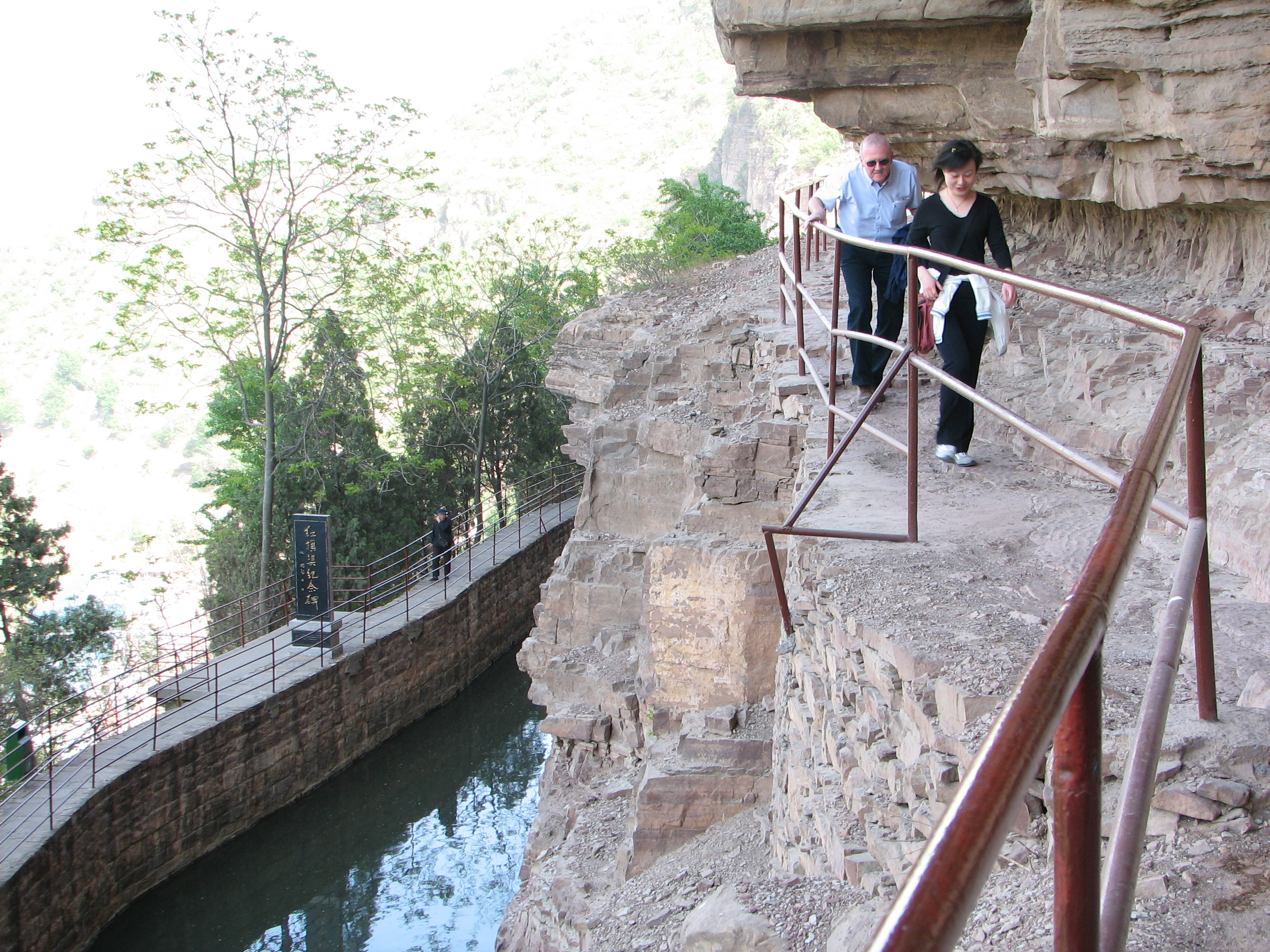
At the Tiger's Mouth Cliff, the Red Flag Canal is built on the side of a cliff.

Lin County was plagued by severe water shortage and frequent droughts. According to the local gazetteer, there were some twenty major droughts that destroyed most crops, in the five centuries before 1920. When Lin County was hit by a severe drought in the summer of 1957, Yang organized the digging of 7,000 wells and water cellars. Two years later, however, the county encountered an unprecedented drought. All four main rivers in the territory, which were the sources of the canals that had been built, ran dry. Most residents had to make long treks to fetch water.

In the face of severe difficulties, Yang and the county party committee decided to bring water from the Zhang River across the Taihang Mountains. The irrigation project, originally called Yin Zhang Ru Lin ("引漳入林," or "divert the Zhang to Lin"), was launched in February 1960, and was officially named the Red Flag Canal the next month. Yang was the leader and chief designer of the project. The project proceeded under very difficult conditions, as China was in the throes of the famine of the Great Leap Forward, and resources and technical skills were severely lacking. The entire county had only 28 hydrological technicians and three million yuan of reserve fund. The monumental project took 30,000 labourers (out of Lin County's total population of 700,000) ten years to complete. It comprised a 70-kilometre (43 mi) trunk canal, 1,500 kilometres (930 mi) of water channels, 24 kilometres (15 mi) of tunnels, and 6.5 kilometres (4.0 mi) of aqueducts. Workers dammed three rivers, flattened 1,250 hills, and moved 18,180,000 cubic metres (642,000,000 cu ft) of earth and stone. Out of the total cost of some 69 million yuan, about 85% was donated by the local residents.

When the Cultural Revolution started in 1966, Yang was dismissed from his government positions and subjected to struggle sessions. He escaped to Beijing via Shanxi in 1967. Premier Zhou Enlai protected him and restored him to the government in April 1968, enabling him to supervise the project to completion in 1969. After its completion, the Red Flag Canal became a showcase project of China, attracting nearly 10,000 visitors from all over the country on a daily basis. An eponymous documentary film was made and screened countrywide; it was even shown at the United Nations by the Chinese delegation in 1974. Zhou Enlai called it one of the two "miracles" of new China, together with the Nanjing Yangtze River Bridge.

== Later career ==
After the completion of the Red Flag Canal, Yang was promoted to deputy director of the Revolutionary Committee of Luoyang Prefecture in July 1969, Party Secretary of Anyang Prefecture in October 1972, and a member of the provincial party standing committee of Henan in February 1973. In August 1973, he was elected as an alternate member of the 10th Central Committee of the Chinese Communist Party. In November 1973, he was transferred to the National Government in Beijing, where he held various positions in the Ministry of Public Security, the Fifth Ministry of Machine Building, and the Ministry of Agriculture.

== Retirement and death ==
Yang retired in June 1995, but was hired by the Shanxi Provincial Government as an advisor to the Yellow River diversion project in 1996. In 2006, the Chinese national government officially elevated him to the rank of vice-minister.

Yang died in the early morning of 10 April 2018, at the age of 89.
