= Linzhou =

Linzhou may refer to:

- Linzhou, Henan (林州), a county-level city in Henan, China
  - Linzhou Steel, a state-owned Chinese steel company
- Lhünzhub County in Tibet, China, known in Chinese as Linzhou (林周)
- Linzhou (林州), a former prefecture in roughly modern Guiping County, Guangxi, China
- Linzhou (林州), a former prefecture in roughly modern Huachi County, Gansu, China
- Linzhou (潾州), a former prefecture in roughly modern Dazhu County (or perhaps Lingshui County), Sichuan, China
