= Yang Gui (disambiguation) =

Yang Gui (1928–2018) was a Chinese politician.

Yang Gui may also refer to following other individuals of which name in Chinese character can be transliterated to Hanyu Pinyin:

- Yang Gui (楊軌, Pinyin: Yáng Guǐ; died 400), Eastern Jin general, see Duan Ye
- Yang Kyu (楊規, Pinyin: Yáng Gūi; died 1101), Korean military official who served the Goryeo dynasty
