= Zhang Xiuping =

Chinese politician

- 张秀萍

Deputy Communist Party Secretary of Jinzhong
- In office April 2013 – November 2014
- Party Secretary: Zhang Pu (张璞)

Personal details
- Born: February 1965 (age 61) Shanyin County, Shanxi, China
- Party: Chinese Communist Party (1985–2014; expelled)
- Education: Shanxi University

Chinese name
- Traditional Chinese: 張秀萍
- Simplified Chinese: 张秀萍
Transcriptions
Standard Mandarin
- Hanyu Pinyin: Zhāng Xiùpíng

Zhang Xiuping (born February 1965) is a former Chinese politician from Shanxi province. Between 2013 and 2014 she served as the deputy party chief of Jinzhong, a prefecture-level city in Shanxi. In August 2014, she was put under investigation by the Communist Party's anti-corruption agency, then she was removed from office and expelled from the party in November 2014.

Chinese media reported that she had close relations with Jin Daoming, who is the former Secretary of the Shanxi Provincial Commission for Discipline Inspection.

== Life and career ==
Zhang was born and raised in Shanyin County, Shanxi. She earned a Ph.D. degree from Shanxi University in 2007.

Zhang began her political career in June 1985, and joined the Chinese Communist Party in July 1989.

She spent five years working in the Organization Department of Shuozhou Municipal Party Committee before serving as deputy director of General Office of Shuozhou Municipal Party Committee.

In March 2000 Zhang was transferred to Taiyuan, capital of Shanxi province, and she worked in Shanxi Provincial Commission for Discipline and Shanxi Provincial Inspection and Supervision Bureau. She was promoted to director in August 2002. In October 2006, he became a member of the Standing Committee of Shanxi Provincial Commission for Discipline.

In April 2013, she was appointed the deputy party chief of Jinzhong, she remained in that position until November 2014, when she was removed from office and expelled from the party for "took advantage of her post to seek profits for others, accepted a huge amount of money and property; and adultery."
