= Yuankang =

Yuankang may refer to:

- Yuankang, Henan (原康), a town in Linzhou, Henan, China

== Historical eras ==
- Yuankang (元康, 65BC–61BC), an era name used by Emperor Xuan of Han
- Yuankang (元康, 291–299), an era name used by Emperor Hui of Jin
