= 山陰 =

山陰 or 山阴 may refer to:

- Saneum, old name of Sancheong County in South Korea
- San'in region, an area in Japan
- Shanyin County, Shanxi province, China

== See also ==
- The dictionary definition of 山 at Wiktionary
- The dictionary definition of 陰 at Wiktionary
- The dictionary definition of 阴 at Wiktionary
