= Huxi =

Huxi may refer to:

- Huxi, Penghu, a rural township in Penghu County (the Pescadores), Taiwan
- Huxi, Shandong, a former prefecture in Shandong Province, China
- Huxi District, Chongqing, China
