= She County =

She County may refer to two counties of the People's Republic of China:

- She County, Anhui (歙县)
- She County, Hebei (涉县)
