= She County, Hebei =

She County 涉县
- County
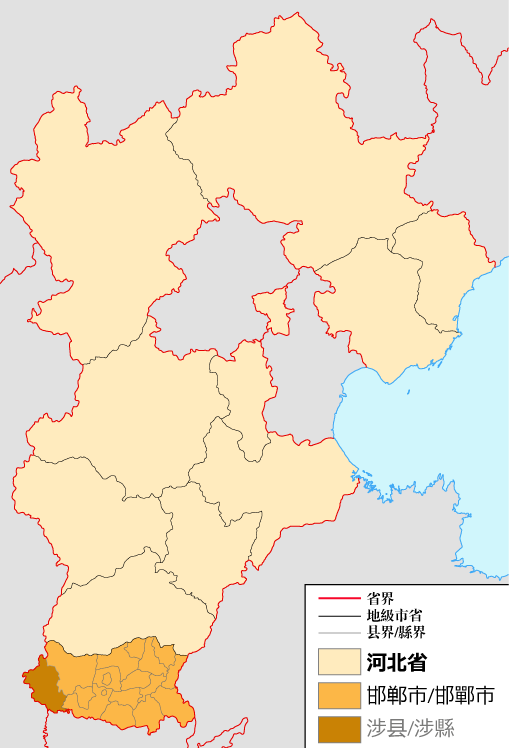
- Location of She County (brown) in Handan City and Hebei
- Coordinates: 36°35′06″N 113°41′28″E
- Country: People's Republic of China
- Province: Hebei
- Prefecture-level city: Handan

Area
  - Total: 1,509.26 km^{2} (582.73 sq mi)
- Elevation: 441 m (1,447 ft)

Population
  - Total: 400,000
  - Density: 270/km^{2} (690/sq mi)
- Time zone: UTC+8 (China Standard)
- Postal code: 056400

She County (simplified Chinese: 涉县; traditional Chinese: 涉縣; pinyin: Shè Xiàn), or Shexian, is a county of southwestern Hebei Province, China, located on the lower reaches of the Zhang River and bordering Shanxi to the west and Henan to the south. It is under the administration of the Handan City, with a population of 400,000 residing in an area of 1,509 km^{2} (583 sq mi). The county administers 9 towns and 8 townships.

== History ==
The present area was originally part of Jizhou, one of the Nine Provinces. During the Spring and Autumn period it was part of the state of Jin, and during the Warring States period became part of the states of Wei and Zhao successively. Later, during the Qin dynasty, it was part of Handan Commandery (邯鄲郡). In 206 BCE, it was officially established as a county, but instead named as Sha County (沙縣), but not long after, was renamed to its present name. In the early part of the Eastern Han, it was renamed State of Shehou (涉侯國), part of the Wei Commandery (魏郡). The Jin dynasty (266–420) saw the area as part of Guangping Commandery (廣平國). The present name was restored again during the Sui dynasty, becoming part of Shangdang Commandery. However, in the early Tang, it was renamed Mo County (漠縣). In the Southern Song, it was controlled by the Jin dynasty (1115–1234) and renamed Chongzhou (崇州). The county's name was restored for the last time during the Ming dynasty, though it was temporarily part of Henan, and it was not until 1949, with the establishment of the People's Republic, that She County was returned to Hebei.

== Administrative divisions ==
The county administers 9 towns and 8 townships.

Towns:

- Shecheng (涉城镇)
- Guxin (固新镇)
- Henandian (河南店镇)
- Gengle (更乐镇)
- Xida (西达镇)
- Xixu (西戍镇)
- Suobao (索堡镇)
- Jiangdian (井店镇)
- Piancheng (偏城镇)

Townships:

- Mujing Township (木井乡)
- Longhu Township (龙虎乡)
- Liaocheng Township (辽城乡)
- Guanfang Township (关防乡)
- Hezhang Township (合漳乡)
- Shentou Township (神头乡)
- Piandian Township (偏店乡)
- Lutou Township (鹿头乡)

== Geography ==
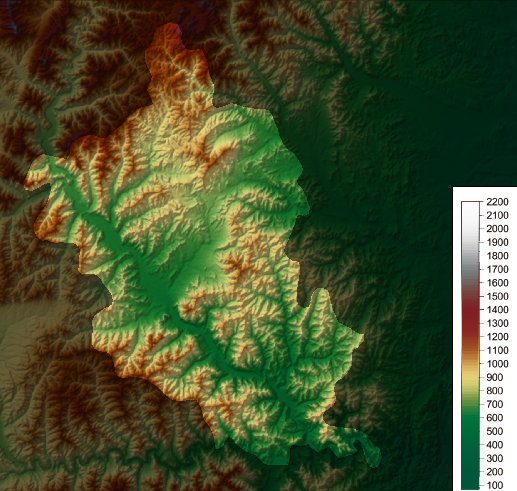
Topographical map of She County

She County is located in the east of the Taihang Mountains, bordering Ci County and Wu'an to the east, Anyang and Linzhou of Henan to the south across the Zhang River, Pingshun County of Shanxi to the west, and Zuoquan County (Shanxi) to the north. It ranges in latitude from 36° 17' to 36° 55' N, spanning a length of 64.5 kilometres (40.1 mi), and in longitude from 113° 26' to 114° E, a width of 37.5 km (23.3 mi), and has a total area of 1,509 km^{2} (583 sq mi). The Zhang River, and its tributaries, is the primary river in the county, and eventually flows into the Hai River.

== Climate ==
Climate data for Shexian, elevation 470 m (1,540 ft), (1991–2020 normals, extremes 1981–present)
| Month | Jan | Feb | Mar | Apr | May | Jun | Jul | Aug | Sep | Oct | Nov | Dec | Year |
|---|---|---|---|---|---|---|---|---|---|---|---|---|---|
| Record high °C (°F) | 20.5 (68.9) | 26.4 (79.5) | 32.3 (90.1) | 39.5 (103.1) | 39.3 (102.7) | 42.3 (108.1) | 41.0 (105.8) | 37.9 (100.2) | 38.8 (101.8) | 33.6 (92.5) | 28.4 (83.1) | 21.6 (70.9) | 42.3 (108.1) |
| Mean daily maximum °C (°F) | 5.5 (41.9) | 9.2 (48.6) | 15.5 (59.9) | 22.5 (72.5) | 27.7 (81.9) | 31.3 (88.3) | 31.5 (88.7) | 30.0 (86.0) | 26.2 (79.2) | 21.0 (69.8) | 13.7 (56.7) | 7.3 (45.1) | 20.1 (68.2) |
| Daily mean °C (°F) | −1.6 (29.1) | 1.9 (35.4) | 8.2 (46.8) | 15.1 (59.2) | 20.5 (68.9) | 24.4 (75.9) | 25.8 (78.4) | 24.3 (75.7) | 19.6 (67.3) | 13.6 (56.5) | 6.4 (43.5) | 0.5 (32.9) | 13.2 (55.8) |
| Mean daily minimum °C (°F) | −6.5 (20.3) | −3.4 (25.9) | 2.2 (36.0) | 8.5 (47.3) | 13.7 (56.7) | 18.3 (64.9) | 21.2 (70.2) | 19.9 (67.8) | 14.6 (58.3) | 8.2 (46.8) | 1.2 (34.2) | −4.2 (24.4) | 7.8 (46.1) |
| Record low °C (°F) | −19.4 (−2.9) | −15.2 (4.6) | −10.1 (13.8) | −3.3 (26.1) | 2.2 (36.0) | 8.7 (47.7) | 13.3 (55.9) | 11.5 (52.7) | 2.9 (37.2) | −3.8 (25.2) | −14.8 (5.4) | −17.2 (1.0) | −19.4 (−2.9) |
| Average precipitation mm (inches) | 4.2 (0.17) | 8.3 (0.33) | 10.6 (0.42) | 30.9 (1.22) | 41.7 (1.64) | 71.6 (2.82) | 144.9 (5.70) | 119.7 (4.71) | 58.9 (2.32) | 30.2 (1.19) | 16.7 (0.66) | 3.3 (0.13) | 541 (21.31) |
| Average precipitation days (≥ 0.1 mm) | 2.5 | 3.4 | 3.7 | 5.8 | 7.1 | 9.5 | 12.9 | 11.6 | 8.6 | 5.9 | 4.1 | 2.1 | 77.2 |
| Average snowy days | 3.1 | 4.1 | 1.8 | 0.4 | 0 | 0 | 0 | 0 | 0 | 0 | 1.9 | 2.9 | 14.2 |
| Average relative humidity (%) | 52 | 50 | 46 | 50 | 53 | 59 | 72 | 75 | 71 | 64 | 58 | 52 | 59 |
| Mean monthly sunshine hours | 158.9 | 164.7 | 204.8 | 231.7 | 252.8 | 214.8 | 187.3 | 189.4 | 180.9 | 186.6 | 174.3 | 170.3 | 2,316.5 |
| Percentage possible sunshine | 51 | 53 | 55 | 59 | 58 | 49 | 42 | 46 | 49 | 54 | 58 | 57 | 53 |
Source: China Meteorological Administration all-time January high

== Transport ==
The location of She County at the intersection of the Handan–Changzhi and Beijing–Guangzhou Railways, and location along G22 Qingdao–Lanzhou Expressway and China National Highway 309 makes it an important transport hub for Hebei province.
