= Guangwu Great Wall =

Section of the Great Wall of China located in Shanyin County, Shanxi

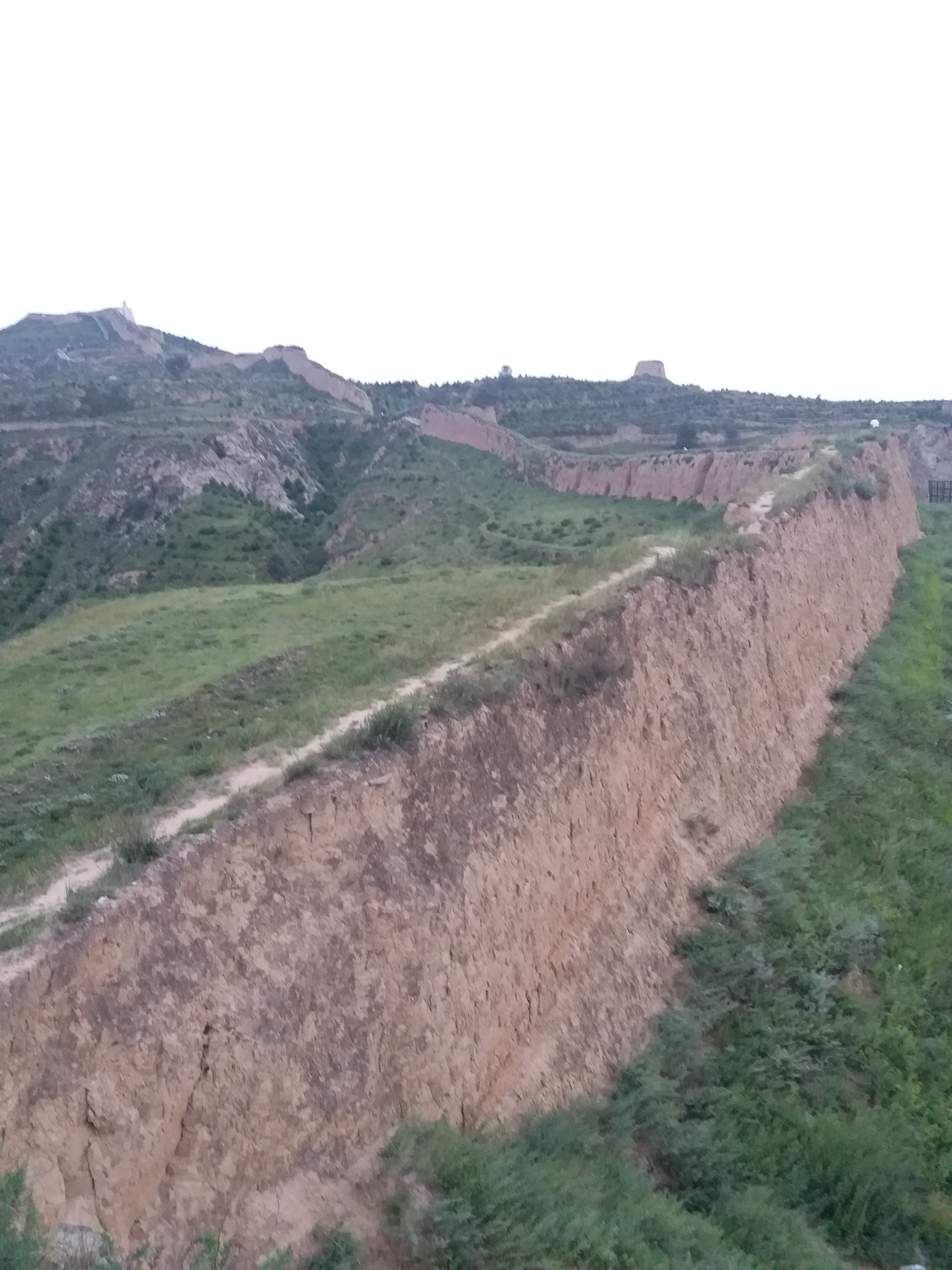
Guangwu section in 2018

The Guangwu Great Wall (Chinese: 广武长城) is a section of the Great Wall of China located in Shanyin County, Shanxi.

== History ==
The section of the wall was integral to the defensive system built around the Yanmen Pass because nomadic invaders would first attack the Guangwu section since it was to the north and west of the pass.

== Geography ==
Nearby the Guangwu section are the present-day inhabited villages of New Guangwu and Old Guangwu. New Guangwu was built during the Ming dynasty on a site first occupied during the Warring States period, while Old Guangwu was built during the Song and Liao dynasties.

== Features ==
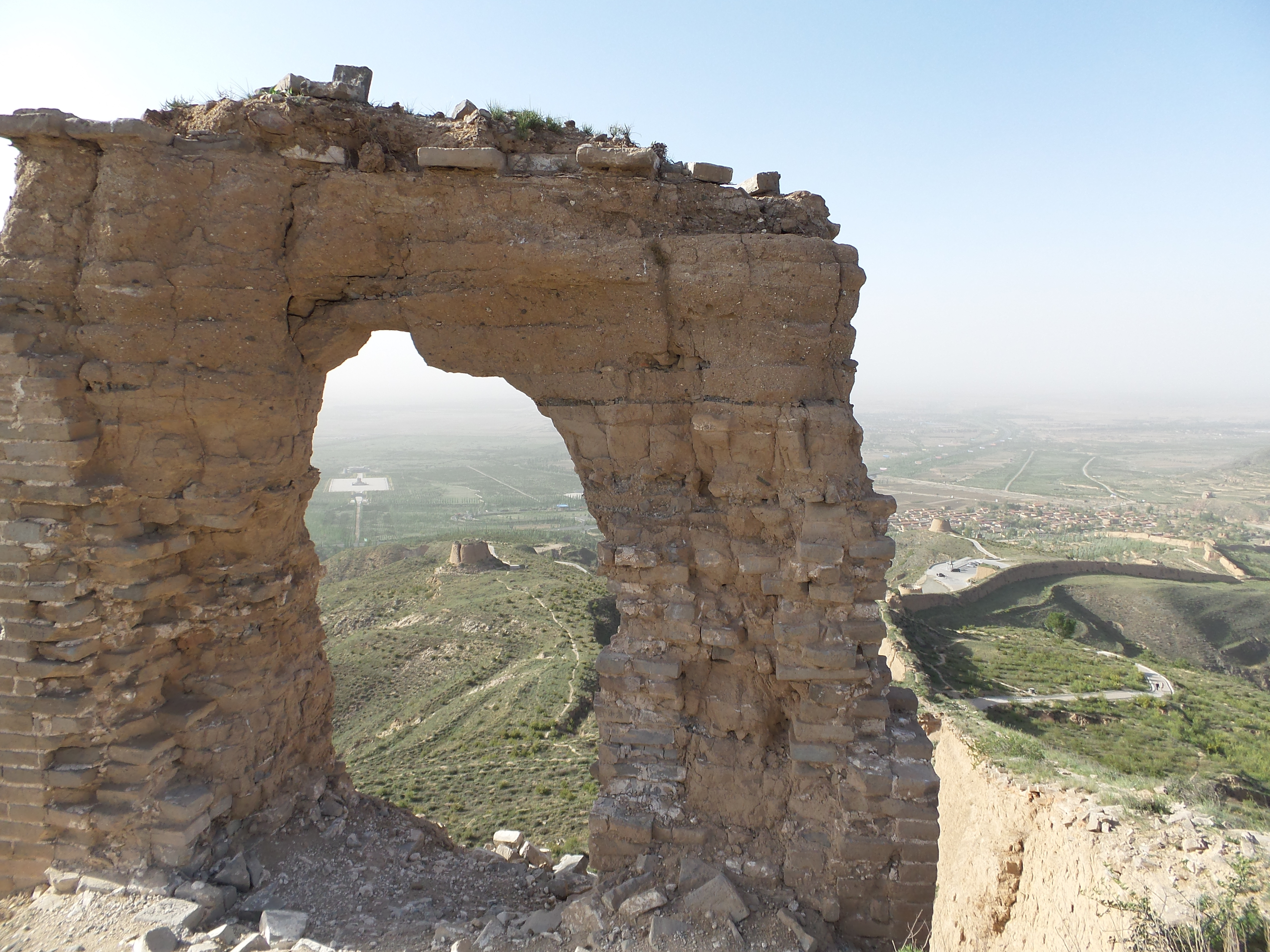
The Moon Gate in 2016

The "Moon Gate" is a distinctive arched shaped door from the ruins of a watchtower.
