= Lin Jiqing =

Chinese educator

Lin Jiqing (Chinese: 林济青; pinyin: Lín Jìqīng, English: Theodore Linn) was a Chinese educator. He was the acting president of Shandong University in Qingdao from July 1936 to 1946. This was during the Second Sino-Japanese War. During this time, Lin oversaw a tumultuous period as president of Shandong University as it moved from Qingdao to Anqing and then to Wanxian in 1938.

Prior to this, Lin was the Dean of the Faculty of Arts and Sciences of Qilu University from around 1930 until 1936, when he was succeeded by Lin Mou. During this time, Lin, through the Harvard-Yenching Institute and in partnership with Dr. Henry Luce, established the Qida Institute of Chinese Studies. Lin attended Lehigh University in Bethlehem, Pennsylvania, receiving a mining engineering degree in 1918 and Columbia University in New York City. During the Xinhai Revolution in 1911, Lin led students to rescue the wounded at a church hospital, and became a revolutionary hero.

During his time at Qilu University and Shandong University, Lin was a close associate and colleague of the writer Lao She, first meeting him in July 1930. during which time Lin was the Dean of the School of Arts and Sciences of Qilu University After leaving his post as president of Shandong University, Lin Jiqing became the director of the Xikang Gold Mine Bureau and then the Southwest Mercury Bureau.

Lin Jiqing was born into the Laiyang Wang clan, a capitalist and Christian family of stature in China. His surname is Yi, and his mother changed his surname to Lin. His grandfather, Lin Qingshan, was one of the earliest Christians in Shandong and the first elder of Dengzhou Church. Lin's brother Yi Zhenqing, a notable pastor and professor at Qidaqian Theological Seminary, was the director of Qilu University. Lin's nephew Yi Fuen was an important pilot and lieutenant general of the national army, serving as a personal assistant to Chiang Kai-Shek. Yi Fuen formed China Airlines, led the Asia Chemical Corporation, and founded the nonprofit Li-Ching Cultural and Educational Foundation. Lin's father, Ming Shu Fan, was also an educator. One of his daughters, Lin Zhanghao, became a professor at Southwest Petroleum Institute.

Academic offices
Preceded by Zhao Taimou	President of Shandong University; 1936 – 1946	Succeeded by Zhao Taimou
