= Bei'anzhuang Township =

Bei'anzhuang Township 北安庄乡
- Rural Township
- Běi'ānzhuāng Xiāng
- Location in Hebei Location in China
- Coordinates: 36°38′41″N 114°12′08″E
- Country: People's Republic of China
- Province: Hebei
- Prefecture-level city: Handan
- County-level city: Wu'an

Area
  - Total: 33.94 km^{2} (13.10 sq mi)

Population (2010)
  - Total: 16,684
  - Density: 491.6/km^{2} (1,273/sq mi)
- Time zone: UTC+8 (China Standard)

Bei'anzhuang Township (Chinese: 北安庄乡; pinyin: Běi'ānzhuāng Xiāng) is a rural township located in Wu'an City, Handan, Hebei, China. According to the 2010 census, Bei'anzhuang Township had a population of 16,684, including 8,581 males and 8,103 females. The population was distributed as follows: 3,229 people aged under 14, 12,211 people aged between 15 and 64, and 1,244 people aged over 65.

== See also ==
- List of township-level divisions of Hebei
