= Bei'anle Township =

Bei'anle Township 北安乐乡
- Rural Township
- Běi'ānlè Xiāng
- Location in Hebei Location in China
- Coordinates: 36°46′23″N 114°19′53″E
- Country: People's Republic of China
- Province: Hebei
- Prefecture-level city: Handan
- County-level city: Wu'an

Area
  - Total: 51.12 km^{2} (19.74 sq mi)

Population (2010)
  - Total: 29,889
  - Density: 584.7/km^{2} (1,514/sq mi)
- Time zone: UTC+8 (China Standard)

Bei'anle Township (Chinese: 北安乐乡; pinyin: Běi'ānlè Xiāng) is a rural township located in Wu'an, Handan, Hebei, China. According to the 2010 census, Bei'anle Township had a population of 29,889, including 15,142 males and 14,747 females. The population was distributed as follows: 6,965 people aged under 14, 21,239 people aged between 15 and 64, and 1,685 people aged over 65.

== See also ==
- List of township-level divisions of Hebei
