= Taomiao, Shandong =

Taomiao 陶庙镇
- Town
- Location in Shandong Taomiao (China)
- Coordinates: 35°10′34″N 116°11′29″E
- Country: People's Republic of China
- Province: Shandong
- Prefecture-level city: Heze
- County: Juye
- Elevation: 41 m (135 ft)
- Time zone: UTC+8 (China Standard)
- Area code: 0530

Taomiao (simplified Chinese: 陶庙; traditional Chinese: 陶廟; pinyin: Táomiào) is a town in Juye County in southwestern Shandong province, China, located on the boundary between the prefecture-level cities of Heze and Zaozhuang. As of 2011, it has 41 villages under its administration.

== See also ==
- List of township-level divisions of Shandong
