= Hua Gang =

Chinese historian (1903–1972)

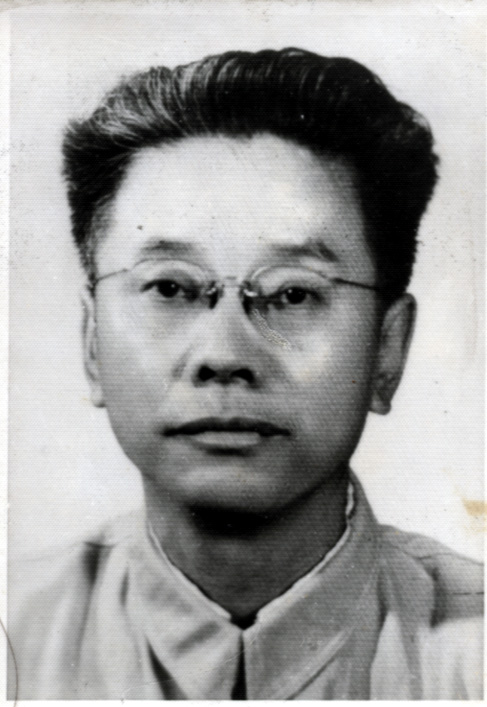
Hua Gang in 1954.

Hua Gang (Chinese: 华岗; pinyin: Huà Gǎng; 1903–1972) was the president of Shandong University in Qingdao from February 1951 until August 1955.

Academic offices
Preceded by Zhao Taimou	President of Shandong University; 1951–1955	Succeeded by Chao Zhefu
