= Pingyuan (province) =

Former province of China

Pingyuan 平原
- Province of China
- 1949–1952
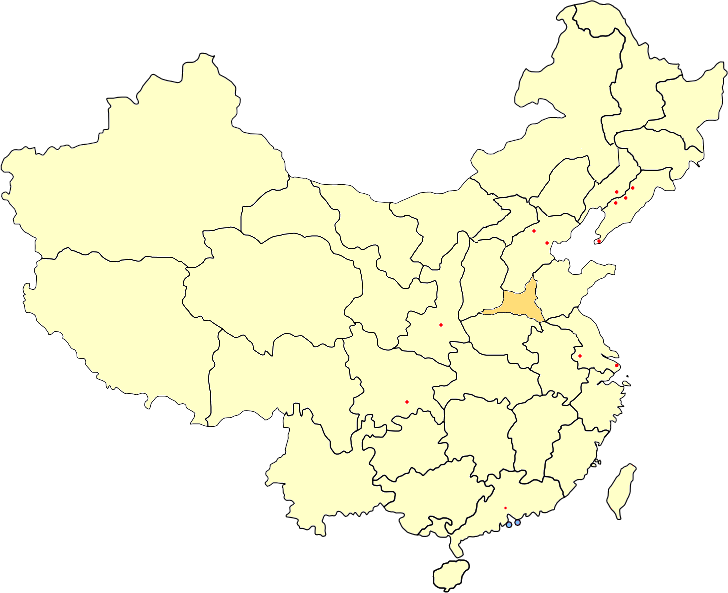
- Location of Pingyuan in China
- Capital: Xinxiang
- History
  - Established: 20 August 1949
  - Disestablished: 15 November 1952
- Today part of: China; Henan; Shandong; Hebei

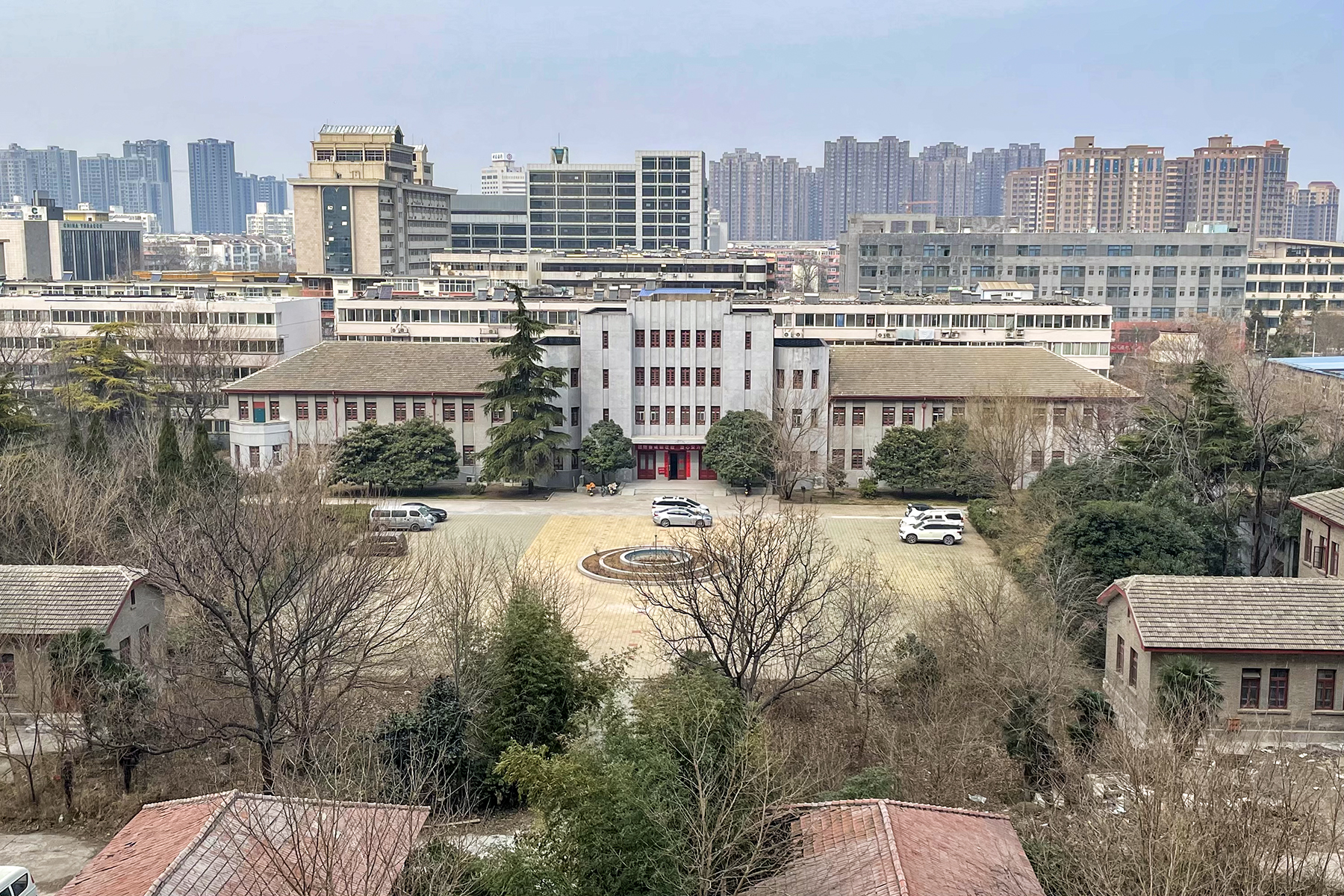
Former Site of the CPC Pingyuan Provincial Committee in Muye, Xinxiang

Pingyuan (Chinese: 平原; pinyin: Píngyuán; Wade–Giles: P'ing-yüan; lit. 'Flat plains') was a former province in Central China, located in what is now part of Henan and Shandong. It existed from 1949 to 1952, and its capital was Xinxiang.

Pingyuan was established on August 20, 1949. It was composed of the following adjoining prefectures in the provinces of Henan and Shandong:

- Xinxiang, Henan (along with then-separate urban centre Xinxiang City)
- Puyang, Henan
- Anyang, Henan (along with then-separate urban centre Anyang City)
- Heze, Shandong
- Huxi, Shandong
- Liaocheng, Shandong

Pan Fusheng was the first Communist Party Chief of the province, and Chao Zhefu was its only governor. In March 1950, a number of peasants and cattle froze to death when transporting grain to government storage in Puyang. Pan took partial responsibility for the "Puyang Incident" and was demoted to deputy party chief. He was replaced by Wu De.

Pingyuan was abolished on November 15, 1952. Its territory were returned to their original provinces, with the exception of Anyang's Wu'an, Shexian and Linzhang counties, which were transferred to Handan prefecture in Hebei.

== Administrative divisions ==
Name	Administrative Seat	Simplified Chinese	Hanyu Pinyin	Subdivisions
Xinxiang	Xinxiang	新乡市	Xīnxiāng Shì	none
Anyang	Anyang	安阳市	Ānyáng Shì	none
Heze Division	Heze County	菏泽专区	Hézé Zhuānqū	8 counties
Huxi Division	Dianxian	湖西专区	Húxī Zhuānqū	2 counties
Liaocheng Division	Liaocheng County	聊城专区	Liáochéng Zhuānqū	11 counties
Puyang Division	Puyang County	濮阳专区	Púyáng Zhuānqū	7 counties
Anyang Division	Anyang County	安阳专区	Ānyáng Zhuānqū	6 counties
Xinxiang Division	Xinxiang County	新乡专区	Xīnxiāng Zhuānqū	13 counties
