= Chao Zhefu =

Chinese politician and educator

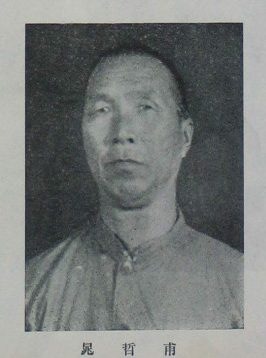
Chao Zhefu

Chao Zhefu (Chinese: 晁哲甫; pinyin: Cháo Zhéfǔ; 3 December 1894 – 13 December 1970) was a Chinese educator and politician. He was born in Qingfeng County, Zhili province (now in Henan), in 1894. He served as a Governor of Pingyuan Province from 1949 to 1952. After Pingyuan was abolished in 1952, he became the Vice-Governor of Shandong Province in 1953. He served as the president of Shandong University in Qingdao from 1956 to 1958. He died in Jinan in 1970.

Academic offices
Preceded by Hua Gang	President of Shandong University; 1956–58	Succeeded by Cheng Fangwu
