= S8 Guangzhou–Foshan–Zhaoqing Expressway =

Road in China

S8 Guangzhou–Foshan–Zhaoqing Expressway, sometimes shortened to Guangwu Expressway, (simplified Chinese: 广梧高速公路; traditional Chinese: 廣梧高速公路; pinyin: Guǎngwú Gāosùgōnglù) is a provincial expressway connecting the cities of Guangzhou, in Guangdong province, and Wuzhou, in Guangxi autonomous region.
