= Zhang River =

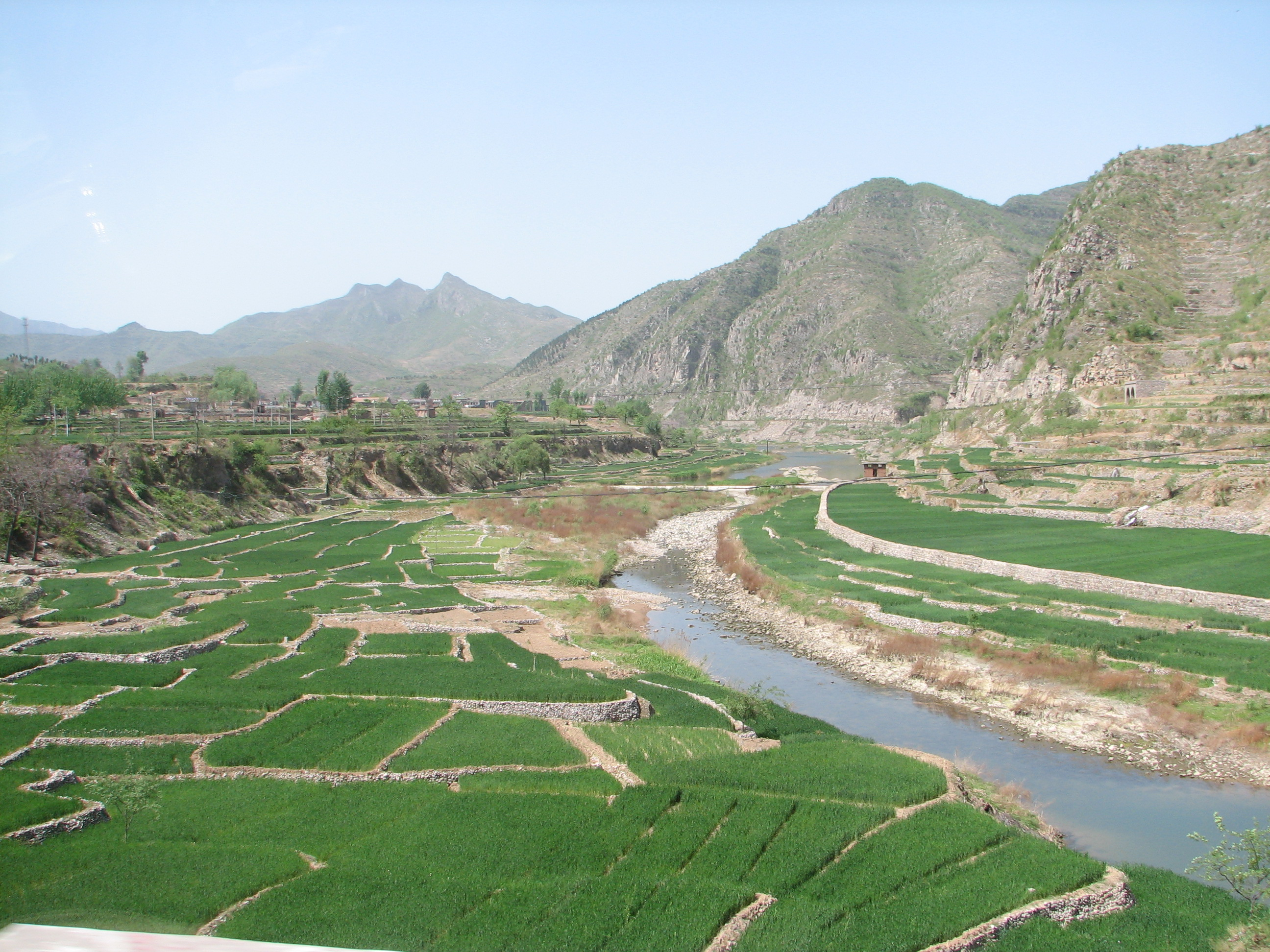
- Zhang River: Henan on the left, Hebei on the right, Shanxi in the distance

- Location of the mouth

Location
- Country: China

Physical characteristics
- Mouth
  - location: Wei River
  - coordinates: 36.4759°N 115.2866°E

Basin features
- River system: Hai River

Zhang River
- Chinese: 漳河
Transcriptions
Standard Mandarin
- Hanyu Pinyin: Zhāng Hé
- Wade–Giles: Chang Ho

The Zhang River is a tributary of the Wei River in China. The river commences at the confluence of the rivers Qingzhang (or Clear Zhang, 清漳河) and Zhuozhang (or Turbid Zhang, 浊漳河), where between She county of Hebei and Linzhou of Henan, then joins the Wei River in Guantao county, Hebei. A dam on the Zhang River diverts water into the Red Flag Canal.

== History ==
A bend in the Zhang was fortified in the Warring States period as the Zhao stronghold of modern Handan. The rebels' failure to secure it quickly enough was instrumental in Liu Bang's swift suppression of Chen Xi's revolt in 197 and 196 BC.
