= Xinguangwu =

Xinguangwu 新广武村
- Village
- Location in Shanxi
- Coordinates: 39°12′57″N 112°47′51″E
- Country: People's Republic of China
- Province: Shanxi
- Prefecture-level city: Shuozhou
- County: Shanyin
- Township: Zhangjiazhuang

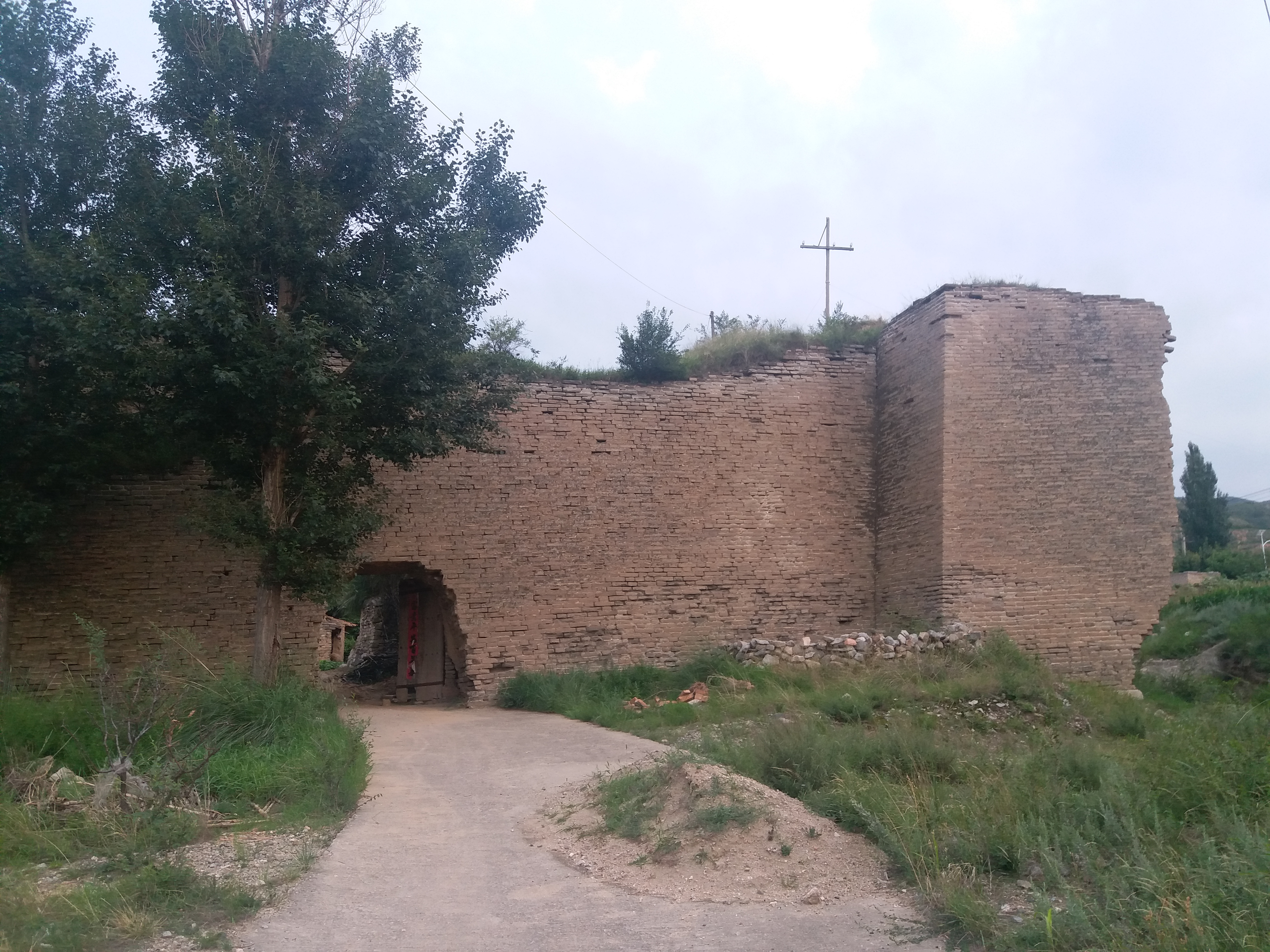
Remnants of fortifications

Xinguangwu (simplified Chinese: 新广武村; traditional Chinese: 新廣武村; pinyin: Xīnguǎngwǔ Cūn; lit. 'New Guangwu') is a village in Zhangjiazhuang Township (张家庄乡), Shanyin County, Shanxi, China. The population of the village is around 2,000 people.

== History ==
The village was built as a fortification during the Ming dynasty in 1374 on the site of a settlement that had existed during the Warring States period. Nearby to the west is Old Guangwu which was built during the Song dynasty, which although earlier than the Ming dynasty came about 1,000 years later than the Warring States period, making in one way the New Guangwu much older than the Old Guangwu.

New Guangwu is to the north of the Yanmen Pass, one of the strategic defensive points of the inner line running through Shanxi of the Ming Great Wall. The village area played a vital part in the defense system around the Yanmen Pass because due to the site's location New Guangwu was first attacked by nomadic raiders coming from the north.

== Tourism ==
Parts of the wall of the fortification still stand, forming the outer wall of the village. Visitors to the village typically stop by on a trek along the nearby section of the Great Wall. The atmosphere of the village has been described as a "time warp" by writer for the New Zealand Herald.
