= Zhao Taimou =

Chinese educator

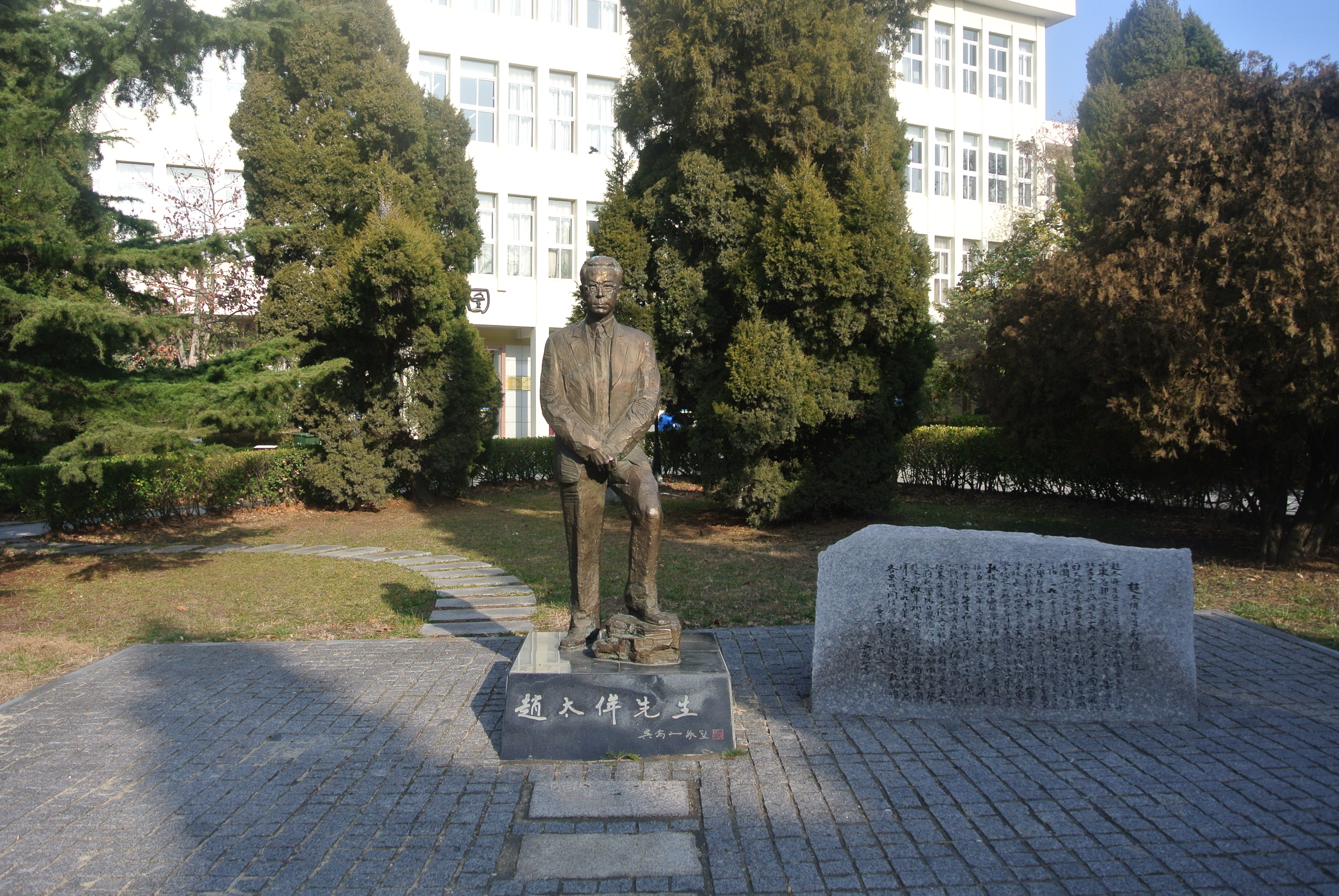
Statue of Zhao Taimou at the Ocean University of China

Zhao Taimou (Chinese: 赵太侔; pinyin: Zhào Tàimóu; 1889–1968) was a Chinese educator. He was the president of Shandong University from September 1932 until June 1936, and again from 1946 until 1949.

== Life ==
Zhao was born in Qingzhou, Shandong in 1889.

In 1914, he entered the English Department of Peking University. In 1919, he entered Columbia University to study literature and continued to the graduate school there to specialize in drama. During the May Thirtieth Movement in 1925, he returned to China at the same time as Wen Yiduo, Yu Shangyuan and Liang Shiqiu.

Zhao served as a professor and head of the Department of Drama at Beijing Art College. He also lectured drama theory courses at Peking University. He was appointed the first president of Shandong University.

After the founding of the People's Republic of China in 1949, Zhao became a professor of foreign languages at Shandong University. He also became a member of the Standing Committee of the CCP Shandong Provincial Committee.

In 1958, when Shandong University moved from Qingdao to Jinan, he stayed in Qingdao and became a professor of foreign languages at Shandong Ocean College (present-day Ocean University of China).

In 1968, Zhao committed suicide by jumping into the ocean.

Academic offices
Preceded by Yang Zhensheng	President of Shandong University; 1932–1936	Succeeded by Lin Jiqing
Preceded by Lin Jiqing	President of Shandong University; 1946–1949	Succeeded by Hua Gang
