= Red Flag Canal =

Irrigation canal in Henan, China

Coordinates: 36°21′12″N 113°45′34″E

- Red Flag Canal in Linzhou, Henan
- Interactive map of Red Flag Canal
- Location: Henan and Shanxi
- Country: China

Specifications
- Length: 71 km (44 miles) (main canal)

History
- Date completed: 1965

Geography
- Start point: Zhang River
- End point: Linzhou

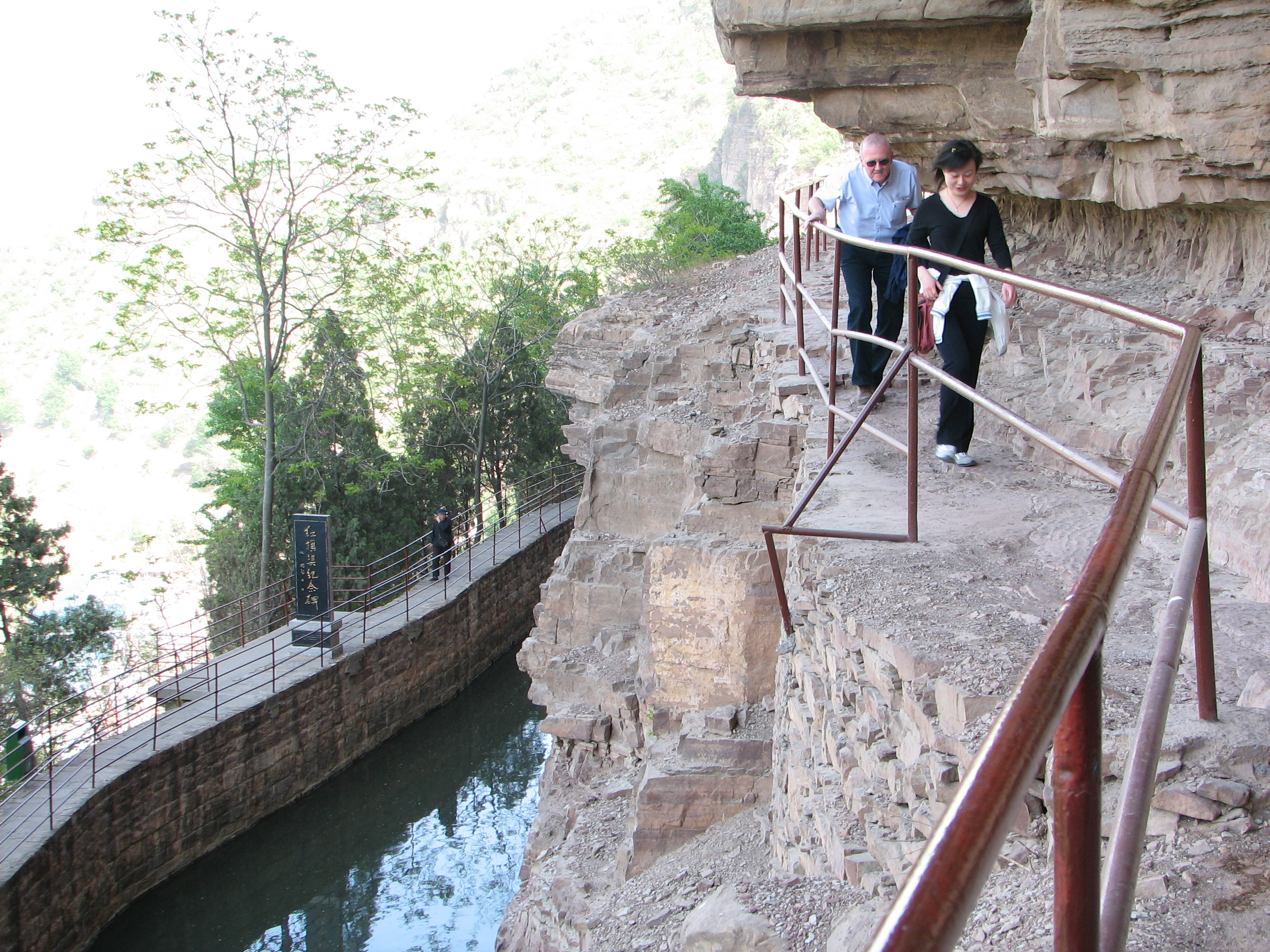
At the Tiger's Mouth Cliff, the Red Flag Canal is built on the side of a cliff

The Red Flag Canal (Chinese: 红旗渠; pinyin: Hóngqí qú) is an irrigation canal located 80 km (50 mi) northwest of Anyang in the northern extremity of Henan, China.

== Geographic location ==
The canal begins close to the border of Henan and Shanxi. It diverts water from the Zhang River (漳河). The Zhang River flows from Shanxi and becomes the border between Hebei and Henan near to Handan. The dam is located near the corner of the three provinces. The canal winds around the side of a cliff, through 42 tunnels and along the side of the Taihang Mountains. The main canal is 71 km (44 mi) long with many branches to distribute the water.

== History ==
The canal was initiated during the Great Leap Forward and was built in the 1960s, with the main channel being completed in 1965. It was dug entirely by hand labour. The main canal is 71 kilometers long. Including the distribution branches, the irrigation system is claimed to have a total length of 1,500 km (930 mi).

It irrigates the fields of the Linzhou district.

The Red Flag Canal was considered to be a great achievement of the Chinese workers in the 1960s and was the subject of several movies. The Red Flag Canal was featured in propaganda both internal and external to China, as an exemplar of what workers could achieve and local mass initiative.

Linzhou (then called Linxian) and the Red Flag Canal were visited by the Italian film director Michelangelo Antonioni when he made his documentary film Chung Kuo, Cina about China during the Cultural Revolution in 1972.

== See also ==
- History of canals in China
