= Wu'an =

Wu'an 武安市 Wuan
- County-level city
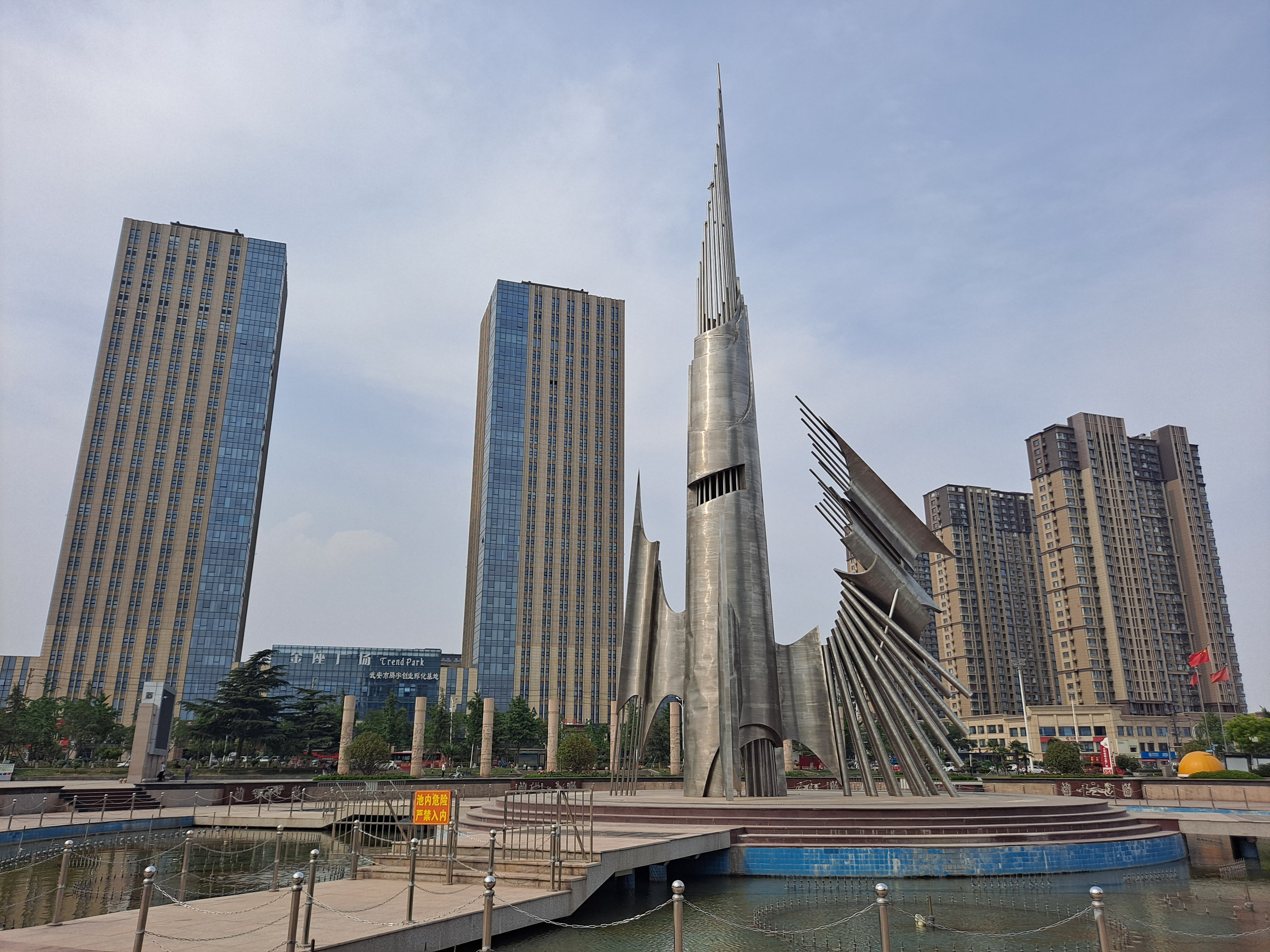
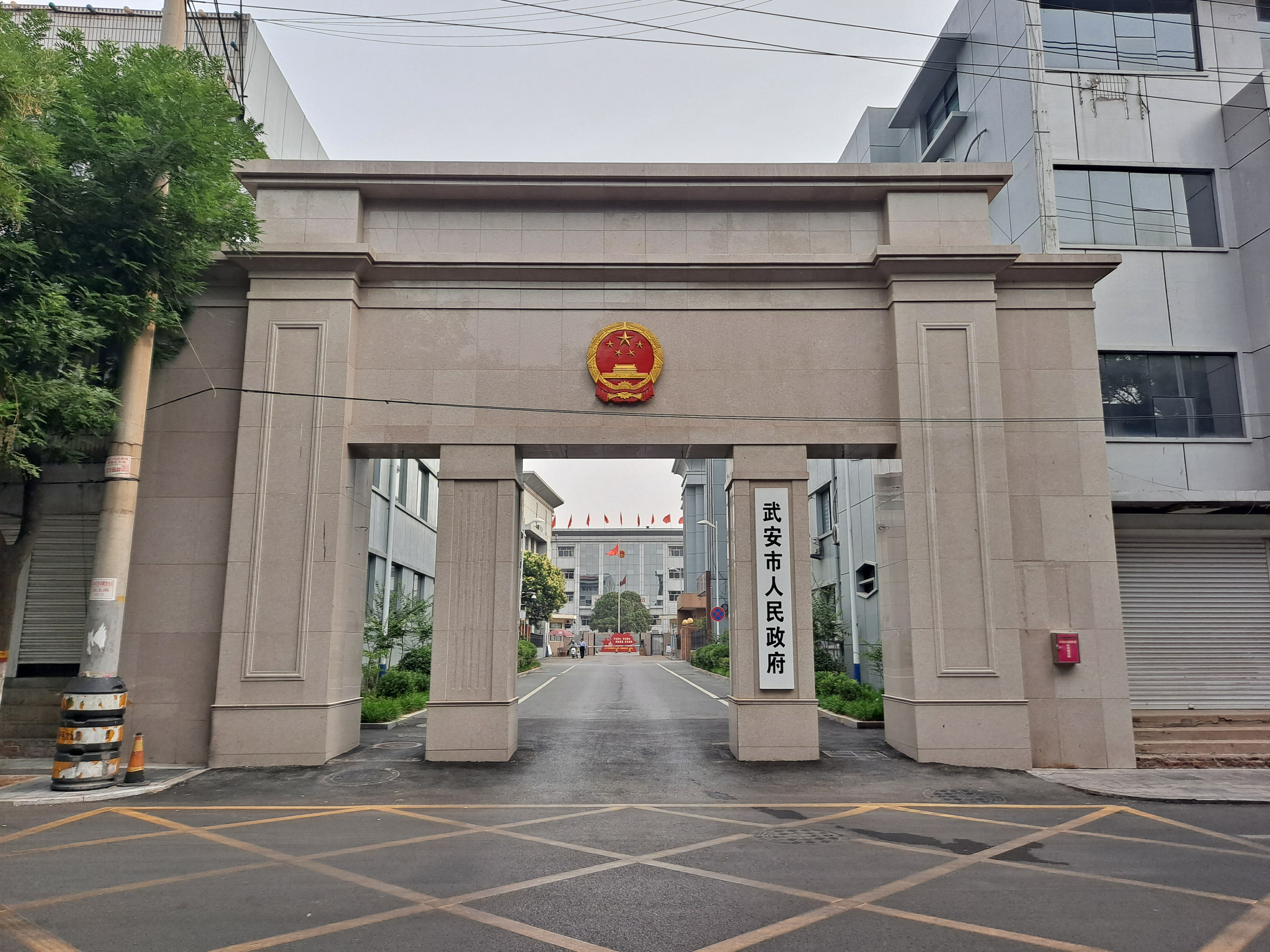
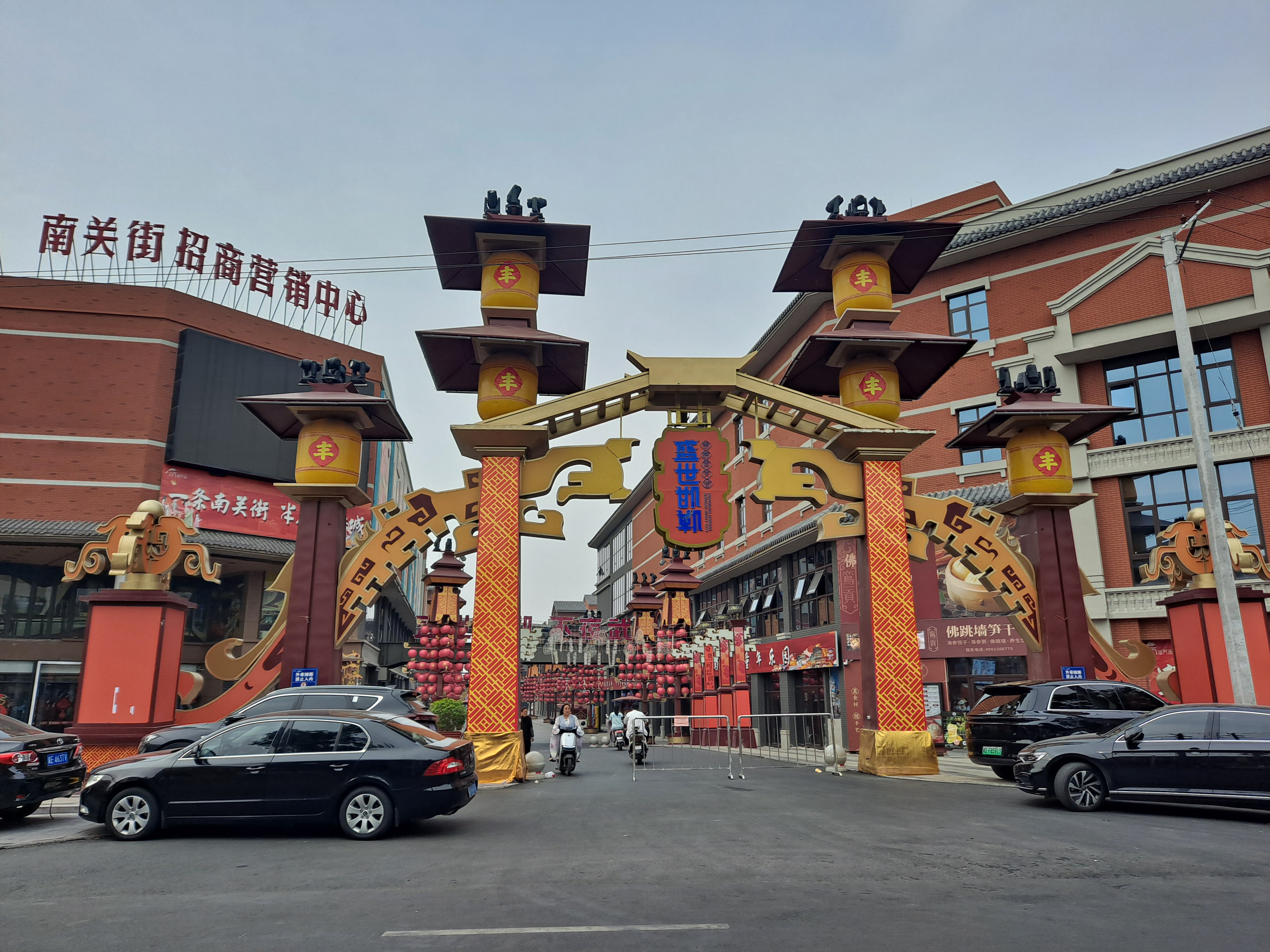
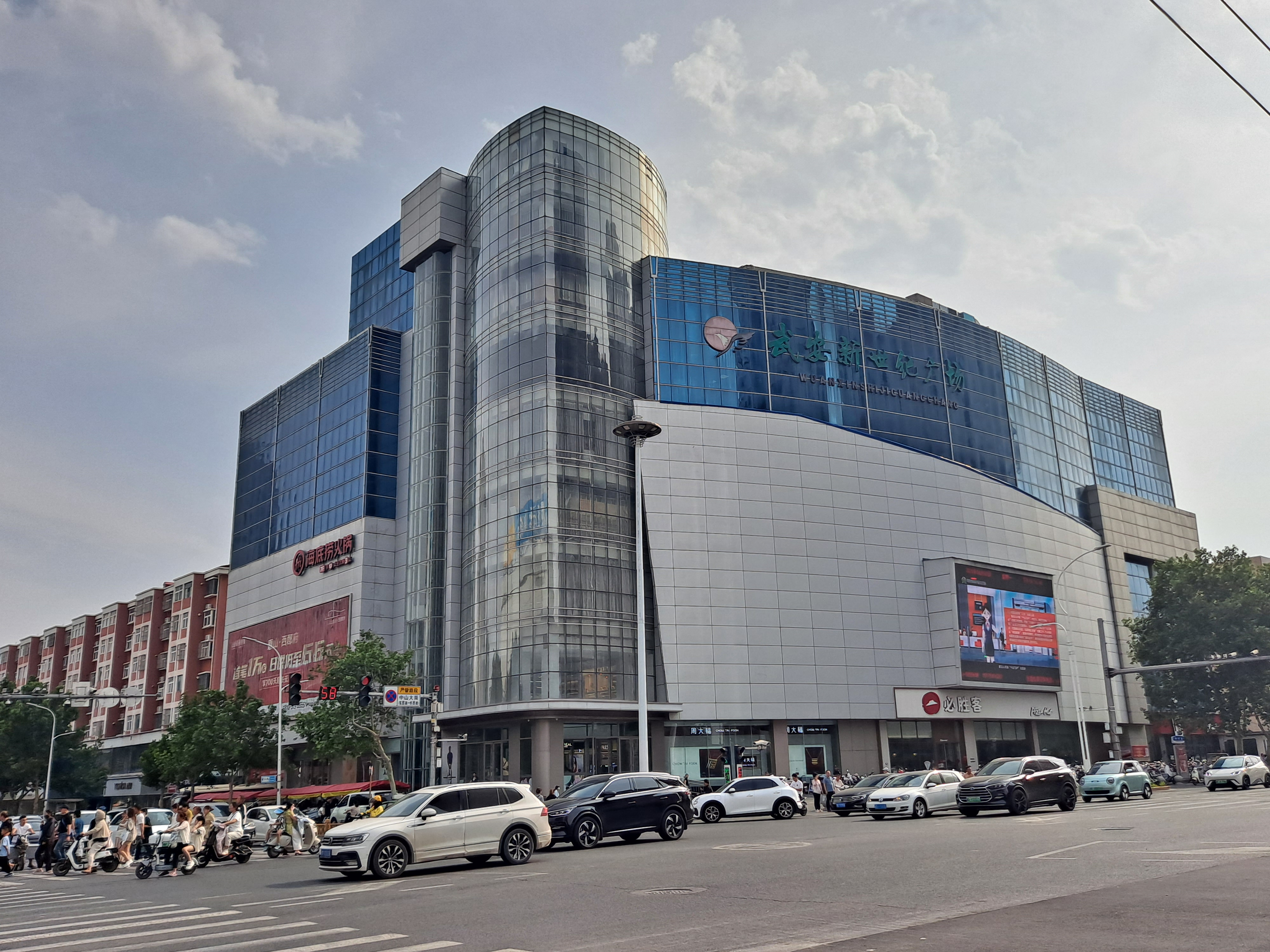
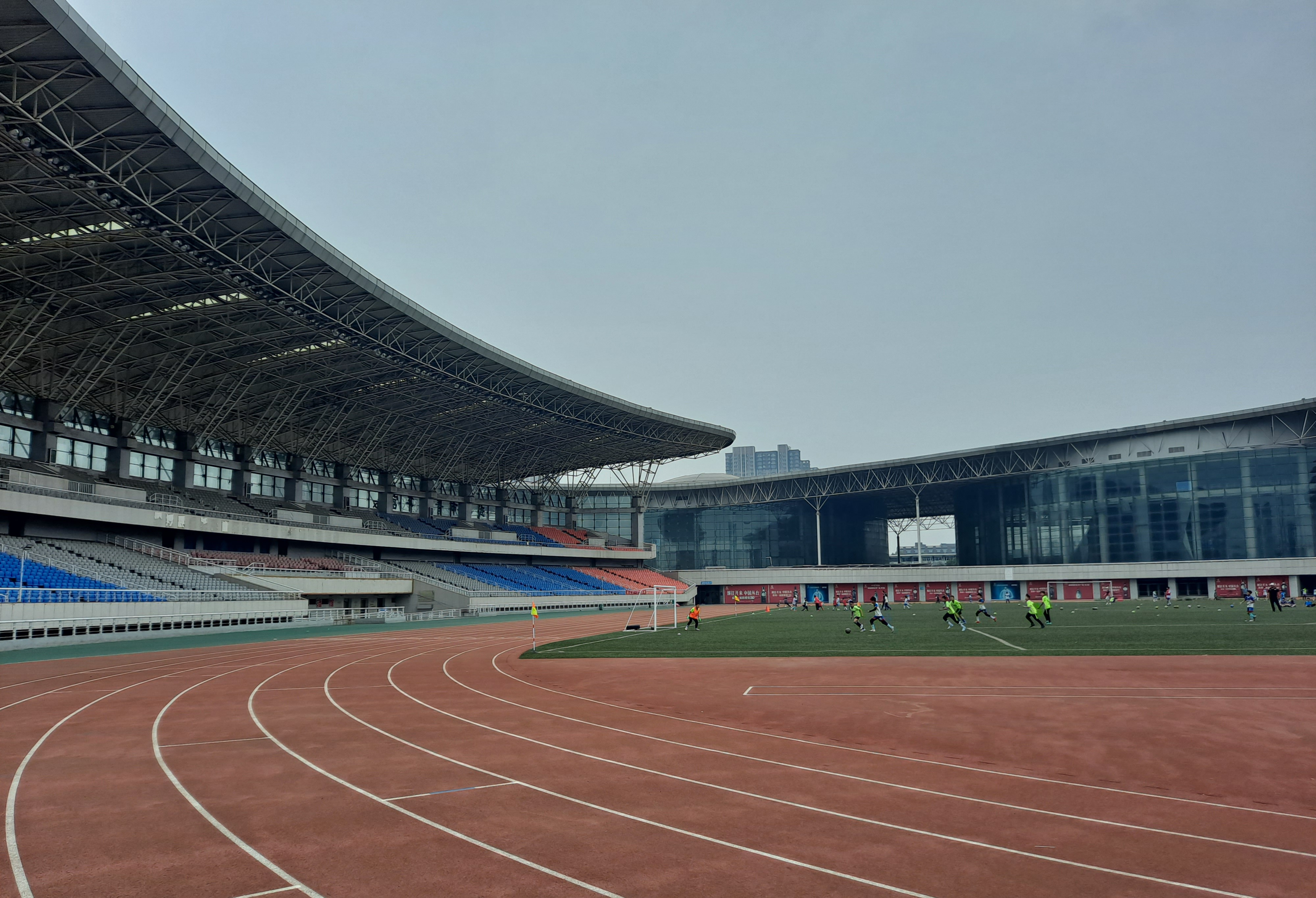
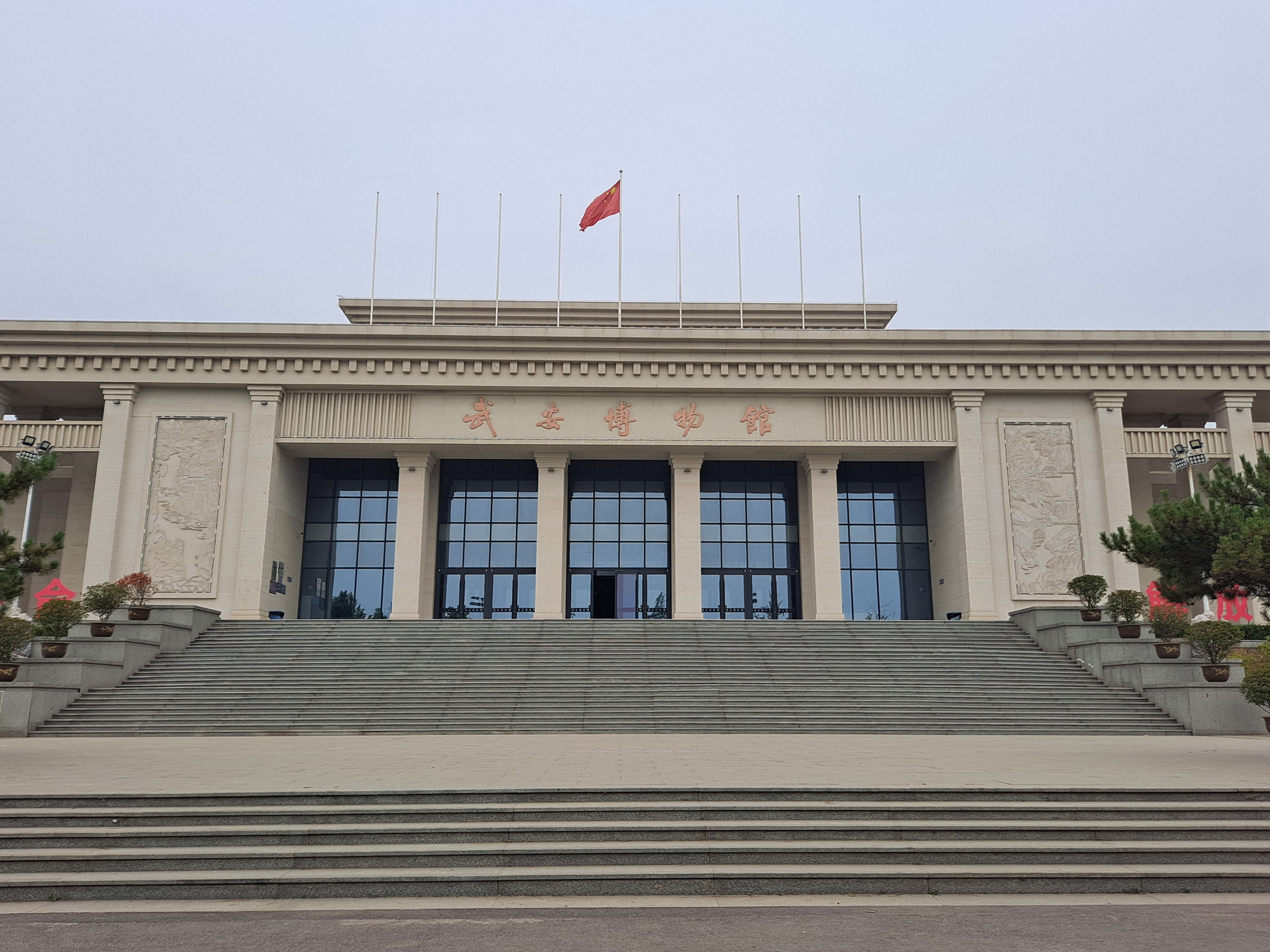
- Wu'an Square Wu'an City Government Nanguan Street, Wu'an Wu'an New Century Wu'an Sports Center Wu'an Museum

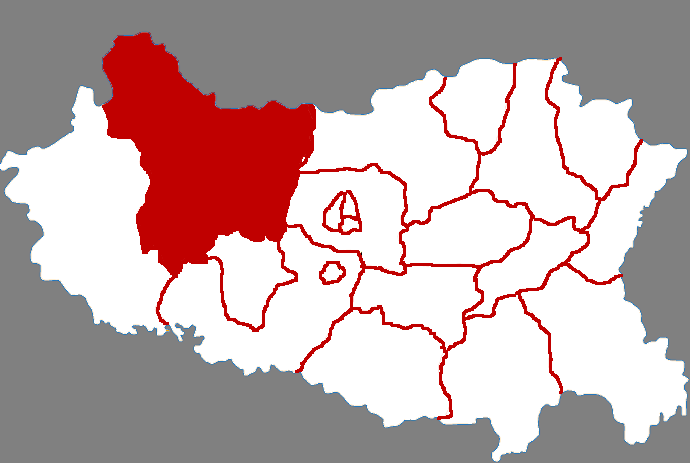
- Wu'an in Handan

- Location in Hebei
- Coordinates: 36°41′49″N 114°12′14″E
- Country: People's Republic of China
- Province: Hebei
- Prefecture-level city: Handan

Area
  - County-level city: 1,806.0 km^{2} (697.3 sq mi)

Population (2020)
  - County-level city: 811,631
  - Urban: 453,442
- Time zone: UTC+8 (China Standard)

Wu'an
- Chinese: 武安
- Literal meaning: War-&-Peace
Transcriptions
Standard Mandarin
- Hanyu Pinyin: Wǔ'ān
- Wade–Giles: Wu-an

Wu'an is a county-level city in the southwest of Hebei Province, China, bordering Shanxi Province to the west. It is under the administration of the prefecture-level city of Handan.

== History ==
=== People's Republic ===
In August 1949, Wu'an was one of three counties to be detached from Handan and attached to Pingyuan Province. In 1952, as Pingyuan dissolved, Wu'an returned to Handan.

== Administrative divisions ==
As of 2020, Wu'an had a population of approximately 812,000.

=== Towns ===
Wu'an Town (武安镇), Kang'ercheng (康二城镇), Niuji (午汲镇), Cishan (磁山镇), Baiyan (伯延镇), Shucun (淑村镇), Datong, Wu'an (大同镇), Yicheng (邑城镇), Kuangshan (矿山镇), Hejin (贺进镇), Yangyi (阳邑镇), Paihui (徘徊镇), Yetao (冶陶镇)

=== Townships ===
Shangtuancheng Township (上团城乡), Bei'anzhuang Township (北安庄乡), Bei'anle Township (北安乐乡), Xitushan Township (西土山乡), Xisizhuang Township (西寺庄乡), Huoshui Township (活水乡), Shidong Township (石洞乡), Guantao Township (管陶乡), Majiazhuang Township (马家庄乡)

== Climate ==
Climate data for Wu'an, elevation 280 m (920 ft), (1991–2020 normals, extremes 1981–present)
Month	Jan	Feb	Mar	Apr	May	Jun	Jul	Aug	Sep	Oct	Nov	Dec	Year
Record high °C (°F)	20.4 (68.7)	22.4 (72.3)	32.9 (91.2)	41.0 (105.8)	39.7 (103.5)	43.8 (110.8)	40.6 (105.1)	38.4 (101.1)	40.7 (105.3)	31.7 (89.1)	28.9 (84.0)	18.8 (65.8)	43.8 (110.8)
Mean daily maximum °C (°F)	4.1 (39.4)	8.1 (46.6)	15.7 (60.3)	22.4 (72.3)	28.1 (82.6)	31.9 (89.4)	31.6 (88.9)	29.9 (85.8)	26.3 (79.3)	20.9 (69.6)	13.0 (55.4)	6.2 (43.2)	19.9 (67.7)
Daily mean °C (°F)	−1.0 (30.2)	2.6 (36.7)	9.7 (49.5)	16.3 (61.3)	22.3 (72.1)	26.3 (79.3)	27.0 (80.6)	25.4 (77.7)	21.1 (70.0)	15.2 (59.4)	7.5 (45.5)	1.1 (34.0)	14.5 (58.0)
Mean daily minimum °C (°F)	−4.8 (23.4)	−1.7 (28.9)	4.6 (40.3)	10.7 (51.3)	16.8 (62.2)	21 (70)	22.9 (73.2)	21.5 (70.7)	16.8 (62.2)	10.7 (51.3)	3.3 (37.9)	−2.7 (27.1)	9.9 (49.9)
Record low °C (°F)	−15.0 (5.0)	−12.3 (9.9)	−6.0 (21.2)	−0.8 (30.6)	7.6 (45.7)	12.9 (55.2)	17.0 (62.6)	12.6 (54.7)	9.2 (48.6)	−1.0 (30.2)	−8.3 (17.1)	−12.9 (8.8)	−15.0 (5.0)
Average precipitation mm (inches)	3.6 (0.14)	8.3 (0.33)	9.4 (0.37)	27.9 (1.10)	48.2 (1.90)	53.4 (2.10)	167.9 (6.61)	123.6 (4.87)	57.6 (2.27)	26.8 (1.06)	15.3 (0.60)	3.5 (0.14)	545.5 (21.49)
Average precipitation days (≥ 0.1 mm)	2.3	3.2	3.0	5.5	7.2	9.3	12.4	10.9	8.0	6.1	4.3	2.3	74.5
Average snowy days	3.9	3.7	1.1	0.3	0	0	0	0	0	0	1.6	2.9	13.5
Average relative humidity (%)	55	52	48	51	53	55	72	77	70	62	60	56	59
Mean monthly sunshine hours	128.3	135.9	179.4	207.4	228.7	197.7	156.4	163.3	160.4	162.5	141.8	138.5	2,000.3
Percentage possible sunshine	42	44	48	52	52	45	35	39	44	47	47	46	45
Source: China Meteorological Administration all-time January high
