= Linzhou Steel =

State-owned Chinese steel company

Linzhou Steel Corporation (Chinese: 林州钢铁) is a state-owned Chinese enterprise established in 1969. It employs 5,122 workers and pensioners on the regular payroll and 2,995 workers on the job. It produces about 400,000 tonnes of pig iron and 100,000 tonnes of cement a year. Though it is in Anyang City, authorities in Puyang, which was formed from part of Anyang, administer its operations.
