= Huxi, Shandong =

Huxi (湖西) was a prefecture in Shandong until the 1949 establishment of the People's Republic of China, and then again from November 1952 for the better part of a year. Between 1949 and November 1952, Huxi was a prefecture in Pingyuan. It no longer exists.

== History ==
=== Early PRC ===
In August 1949 Huxi was transferred, along with Heze and Liaocheng prefectures, out from under the Shandong government and over to that of the experimental province of Pingyuan.

On November 15, 1952 the National Govt ended the experiment and restored all three prefectures to Shandong.

On July 20 of the following year, Huxi was dismantled; its western half was annexed by Heze and its eastern half—with the old prefecture's eponymous Nanyang Lakefront—was annexed by Jining.
