= Shanyin County =

Coordinates: 39.5262°N 112.817°E

Shanyin County 山阴县
- County
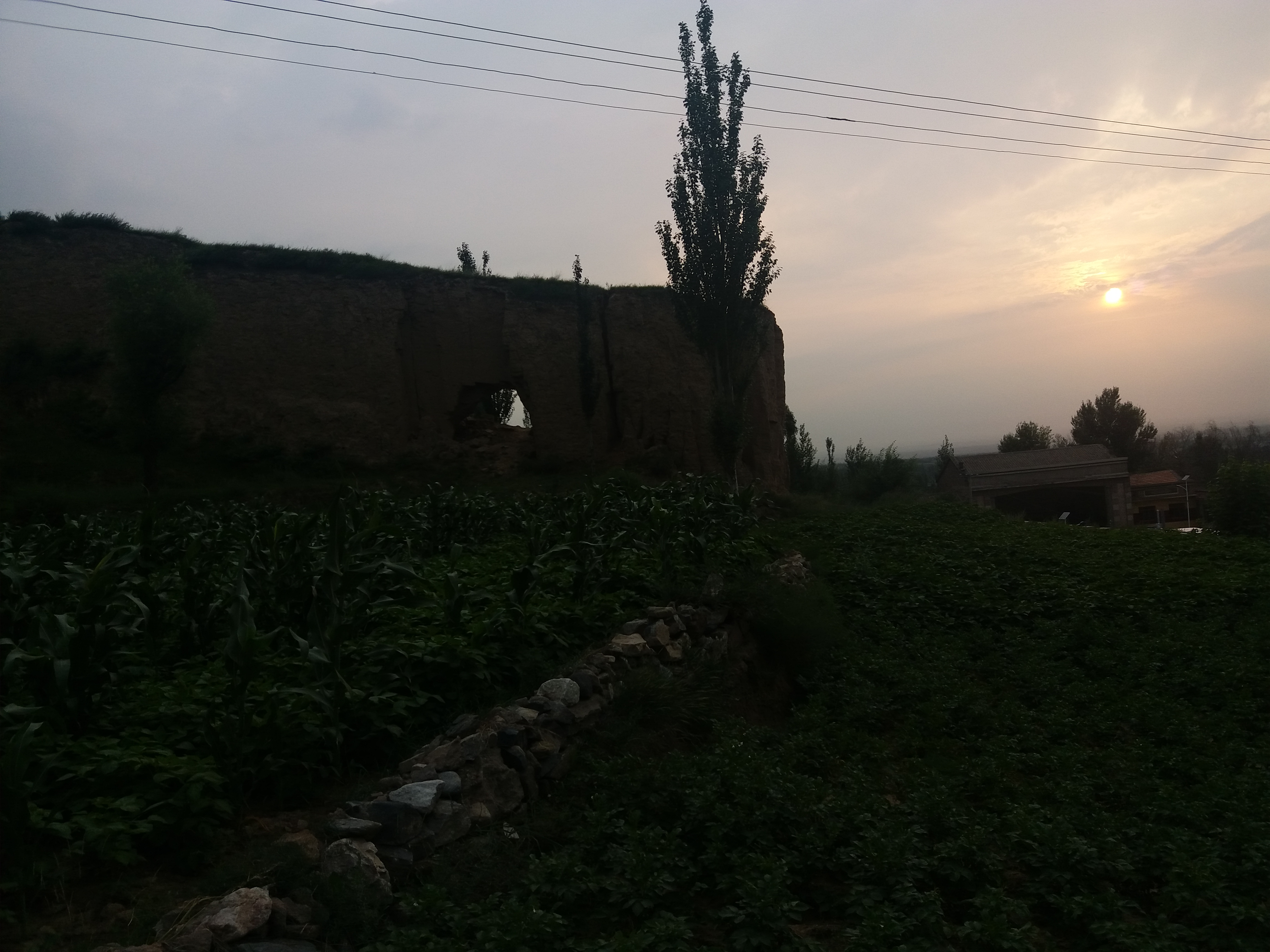

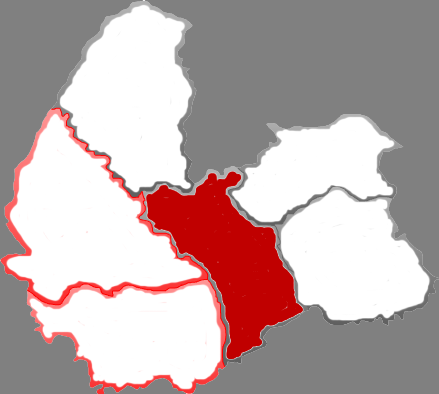
- Shanyin in Shuozhou

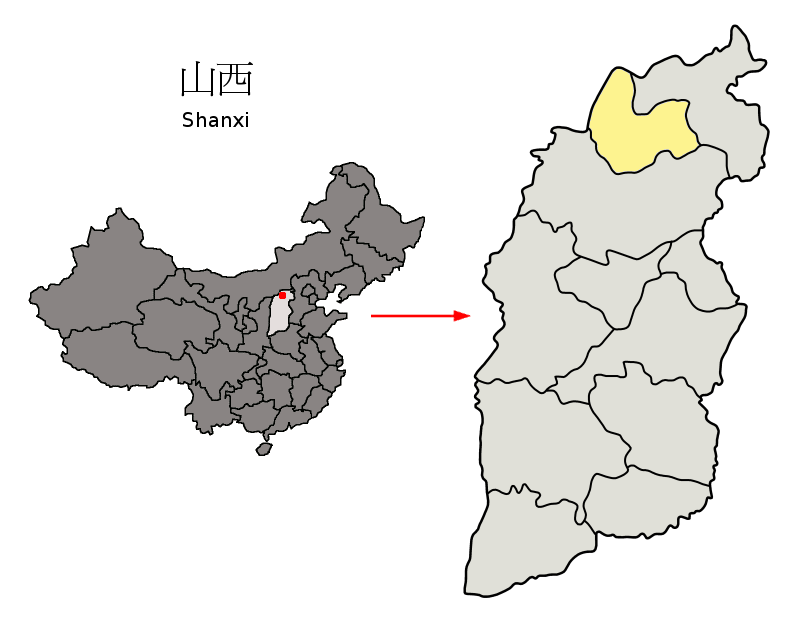
- Shuozhou in Shanxi
- Country: People's Republic of China
- Province: Shanxi
- Prefecture-level city: Shuozhou

Population (2020)
  - Total: 199,505
- Time zone: UTC+8 (China Standard)

Shanyin County (simplified Chinese: 山阴县; traditional Chinese: 山陰縣; pinyin: Shānyīn Xiàn) is a county in the northwest of Shanxi province, China. It is under the administration of Shuozhou City.

The Guangwu section of the Great Wall runs along the county. Near the section of the Great Wall are the historic villages of New Guangwu and Old Guangwu.

== Climate ==
Climate data for Shanyin, elevation 1,045 m (3,428 ft), (1991–2020 normals, extremes 1981–present)
Month	Jan	Feb	Mar	Apr	May	Jun	Jul	Aug	Sep	Oct	Nov	Dec	Year
Record high °C (°F)	12.6 (54.7)	19.7 (67.5)	26.3 (79.3)	36.5 (97.7)	35.9 (96.6)	38.9 (102.0)	39.4 (102.9)	35.6 (96.1)	35.0 (95.0)	28.3 (82.9)	23.0 (73.4)	16.9 (62.4)	39.4 (102.9)
Mean daily maximum °C (°F)	−1.6 (29.1)	3.5 (38.3)	10.3 (50.5)	18.3 (64.9)	24.4 (75.9)	28.2 (82.8)	28.9 (84.0)	27.2 (81.0)	22.8 (73.0)	16.2 (61.2)	7.5 (45.5)	0.2 (32.4)	15.5 (59.9)
Daily mean °C (°F)	−9.0 (15.8)	−4.3 (24.3)	2.9 (37.2)	10.9 (51.6)	17.4 (63.3)	21.4 (70.5)	22.8 (73.0)	20.9 (69.6)	15.6 (60.1)	8.8 (47.8)	0.4 (32.7)	−6.7 (19.9)	8.4 (47.2)
Mean daily minimum °C (°F)	−15.2 (4.6)	−10.9 (12.4)	−3.8 (25.2)	3.4 (38.1)	9.9 (49.8)	14.5 (58.1)	17.0 (62.6)	15.1 (59.2)	9.1 (48.4)	2.3 (36.1)	−5.5 (22.1)	−12.4 (9.7)	2.0 (35.5)
Record low °C (°F)	−28.4 (−19.1)	−26.6 (−15.9)	−23.1 (−9.6)	−11.2 (11.8)	−3.2 (26.2)	2.9 (37.2)	7.2 (45.0)	4.7 (40.5)	−1.3 (29.7)	−11.1 (12.0)	−24.0 (−11.2)	−28.3 (−18.9)	−28.4 (−19.1)
Average precipitation mm (inches)	1.7 (0.07)	3.2 (0.13)	9.3 (0.37)	20.2 (0.80)	31.6 (1.24)	48.0 (1.89)	95.7 (3.77)	77.1 (3.04)	54.7 (2.15)	21.6 (0.85)	8.8 (0.35)	1.6 (0.06)	373.5 (14.72)
Average precipitation days (≥ 0.1 mm)	2.0	2.4	3.6	4.6	7.0	10.0	11.8	11.1	9.4	5.7	3.5	1.6	72.7
Average snowy days	2.7	3.7	2.8	1.2	0	0	0	0	0	0.4	2.9	2.7	16.4
Average relative humidity (%)	51	44	40	38	39	50	65	69	64	56	53	51	52
Mean monthly sunshine hours	180.5	188.6	232.2	247.2	269.9	245.0	242.9	234.1	214.7	217.7	189.2	178.9	2,640.9
Percentage possible sunshine	60	62	62	62	60	55	54	56	58	64	64	62	60
Source: China Meteorological Administration all-time January high
