= Linzhou, Henan =

Linzhou 林州市
- County-level city
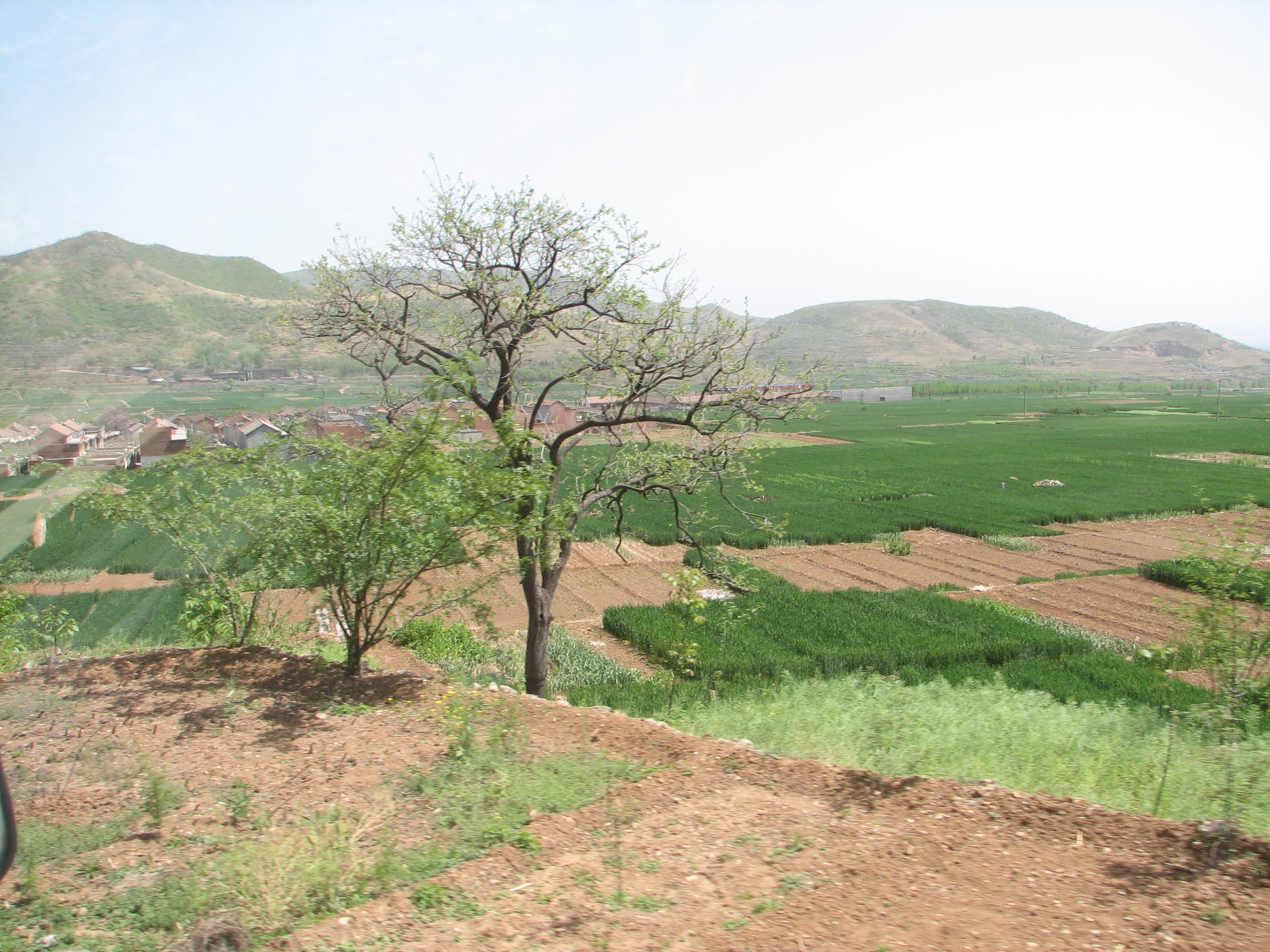
- Farms in Linzhou, Henan, irrigated by the Red Flag Canal

- Location in Henan
- Country: People's Republic of China
- Province: Henan
- Prefecture-level city: Anyang

Area
  - Total: 2,046 km^{2} (790 sq mi)

Population (2019)
  - Total: 815,000
- Time zone: UTC+8 (China Standard)
- Postal code: 456550
- Area code: (0)372

Linzhou (Chinese: 林州; pinyin: Línzhōu), formerly Lin County or Linxian (simplified Chinese: 林县; traditional Chinese: 林縣; pinyin: Lín Xiàn), is a county-level city in Anyang, Henan, China. Adjacent to Shanxi Province and Hebei Province, it is located in the northernmost part of Henan Province and at the eastern foot of the Taihang Mountains. It covers an area of 2046 square kilometers and has a population of about one million.

Linzhou is well known for its Red Flag Canal, which was constructed in the 1960s and visited by Italian film director Michelangelo Antonioni during the early 1970s.

== Administrative divisions ==
As of 2012, this city is divided into 20 township-level administrative divisions, including 4 subdistricts, 13 towns, and 3 townships.

Subdistricts

- Guiyuan Subdistrict (桂园街道)
- Longshan Subdistrict (龙山街道)
- Kaiyuan Subdistrict (开元街道)
- Zhenlin Subdistrict (振林街道)

Towns

- Caisang (采桑镇)
- Donggang (东岗镇)
- Dongyao (东姚镇)
- Guilin (桂林镇)
- Hejian (合涧镇)
- Hengshui (横水镇)
- Heshun (河顺镇)
- Lingyang (陵阳镇)
- Linqi (临淇镇)
- Rencun (任村镇)
- Wulong (五龙镇)
- Yaocun (姚村镇)
- Yuankang (原康镇)

Townships

- Chadian Township (茶店乡)
- Chengjiao Township (城郊乡)
- Shiban Township (石板岩乡)

== Climate ==
Climate data for Linzhou, elevation 307 m (1,007 ft), (1991–2020 normals, extremes 1976–present)
Month	Jan	Feb	Mar	Apr	May	Jun	Jul	Aug	Sep	Oct	Nov	Dec	Year
Record high °C (°F)	20.0 (68.0)	28.2 (82.8)	32.6 (90.7)	40.8 (105.4)	43.2 (109.8)	42.7 (108.9)	43.3 (109.9)	39.0 (102.2)	40.6 (105.1)	34.5 (94.1)	28.5 (83.3)	25.1 (77.2)	43.3 (109.9)
Mean daily maximum °C (°F)	5.0 (41.0)	8.8 (47.8)	14.8 (58.6)	22.0 (71.6)	27.5 (81.5)	31.5 (88.7)	31.4 (88.5)	29.8 (85.6)	26.0 (78.8)	21.1 (70.0)	13.4 (56.1)	6.9 (44.4)	19.9 (67.7)
Daily mean °C (°F)	−1.8 (28.8)	2.1 (35.8)	8.1 (46.6)	15.3 (59.5)	21.2 (70.2)	25.6 (78.1)	26.3 (79.3)	24.6 (76.3)	20.1 (68.2)	14.5 (58.1)	6.5 (43.7)	0.2 (32.4)	13.6 (56.4)
Mean daily minimum °C (°F)	−6.5 (20.3)	−2.8 (27.0)	2.4 (36.3)	8.8 (47.8)	14.7 (58.5)	19.6 (67.3)	21.8 (71.2)	20.3 (68.5)	15.1 (59.2)	9.1 (48.4)	1.5 (34.7)	−4.3 (24.3)	8.3 (47.0)
Record low °C (°F)	−21.5 (−6.7)	−20.5 (−4.9)	−8.8 (16.2)	−4.4 (24.1)	2.3 (36.1)	9.1 (48.4)	15.1 (59.2)	11.0 (51.8)	4.2 (39.6)	−3.1 (26.4)	−18.2 (−0.8)	−23.6 (−10.5)	−23.6 (−10.5)
Average precipitation mm (inches)	4.1 (0.16)	8.7 (0.34)	13.9 (0.55)	32.5 (1.28)	51.1 (2.01)	68.8 (2.71)	171.9 (6.77)	147.2 (5.80)	76.3 (3.00)	27.8 (1.09)	19.4 (0.76)	4.4 (0.17)	626.1 (24.64)
Average precipitation days (≥ 0.1 mm)	2.6	3.3	4.0	5.6	7.3	9.0	13.6	12.4	9.4	5.6	4.2	2.2	79.2
Average snowy days	3.7	3.9	1.6	0.3	0	0	0	0	0	0	1.8	2.9	14.2
Average relative humidity (%)	61	58	54	55	57	58	74	78	74	66	66	63	64
Mean monthly sunshine hours	141.4	140.0	187.3	212.0	235.5	203.8	173.5	170.6	161.1	174.6	153.2	143.7	2,096.7
Percentage possible sunshine	45	45	50	54	54	47	39	41	44	51	50	48	47
Source: China Meteorological Administration all-time extreme temperature all-time provincial May high all-time January high

== See also ==
- Linzhou Steel
