= 14th State Council of China =

Chinese government headed by Premier Li Qiang

Li Qiang government 李强政府
- 14th State Council of China
- Incumbent
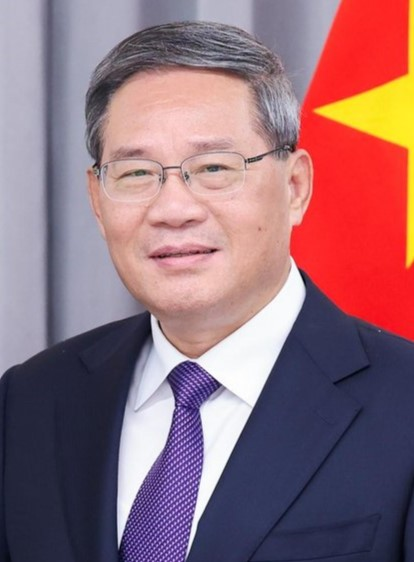
- Premier Li Qiang
- Date formed: 12 March 2023

People and organisations
- Premier: Li Qiang
- Vice Premiers: Ding Xuexiang; He Lifeng; Zhang Guoqing; Liu Guozhong
- Member party: Chinese Communist Party; Eight minor parties
- Status in legislature: One-party state

History
- Election: 2023 Congress
- Outgoing election: 2023 Congress
- Legislature term: 14th Congress
- Predecessor: Li Keqiang Government

Li Qiang Government
- Simplified Chinese: 李强政府
- Traditional Chinese: 李強政府
Transcriptions
Standard Mandarin
- Hanyu Pinyin: Lǐ Qiáng Zhèngfǔ

Li Qiang Cabinet
- Simplified Chinese: 李强内阁
- Traditional Chinese: 李強內閣
Transcriptions
Standard Mandarin
- Hanyu Pinyin: Lǐ Qiáng Nèigé

The Li Qiang government is the 14th and current State Council of China since March 2023, under the Li Qiang premiership. It succeeded the Li Keqiang government. Premier Li is ranked only second to General Secretary of the Chinese Communist Party Xi Jinping among 7 members of the 20th Politburo Standing Committee, the top decision-making body of the Chinese Communist Party (CCP).

During the 1st Session of the 14th National People's Congress in March 2023, Li Qiang was appointed by President Xi Jinping to replace Li Keqiang as Premier of the State Council, China's head of government, according to the approval of the National People's Congress.

According to the constitution of China, the President nominates the Premier of the State Council, and the Premier nominates the Vice-Premiers, State Councilors and Ministers. The nominations were approved by National People's Congress voting.

== Cabinet (14th State Council) ==
=== State Council leaders ===
Members of the Executive Meeting of the 14th State Council (March 2023 – present)
#	Office	Officeholder	Birth year	Party	Took office	Left office
1	Premier	Li Qiang 李强	1958	CCP (PSC)	11 March 2023	Incumbent
2	Vice Premier	Ding Xuexiang 丁薛祥	1961	CCP (PSC)	12 March 2023	Incumbent
3	Vice Premier	He Lifeng 何立峰	1955	CCP (Politburo)	12 March 2023	Incumbent
4	Vice Premier	Zhang Guoqing 张国清	1964	CCP (Politburo)	12 March 2023	Incumbent
5	Vice Premier	Liu Guozhong 刘国中	1962	CCP (Politburo)	12 March 2023	Incumbent
6	State Councilor	Li Shangfu 李尚福	1958	CCP	12 March 2023	24 October 2023
6	Minister of National Defense	Li Shangfu 李尚福	1958	CCP	12 March 2023	24 October 2023
7	State Councilor	Wang Xiaohong 王小洪	1957	CCP (Secretariat)	12 March 2023	Incumbent
7	Minister of Public Security	Wang Xiaohong 王小洪	1957	CCP (Secretariat)	24 June 2022	Incumbent
8	State Councilor	Wu Zhenglong 吴政隆	1964	CCP	12 March 2023	Incumbent
8	Secretary-General, General Office	Wu Zhenglong 吴政隆	1964	CCP	12 March 2023	Incumbent
9	State Councilor	Shen Yiqin 谌贻琴	1959	CCP	12 March 2023	Incumbent
10	State Councilor	Qin Gang 秦刚	1966	CCP	12 March 2023	24 October 2023
10	Minister of Foreign Affairs	Qin Gang 秦刚	1966	CCP	30 December 2022	25 July 2023

=== Cabinet-level departments ===
Constituent Departments of the 14th State Council (12 March 2023 – present)
#	Office	Officeholder	Birth year	Party	Took office	Left office
1	Minister of Foreign Affairs	Qin Gang 秦刚	1966	CCP	30 December 2022	25 July 2023
1	Minister of Foreign Affairs	Wang Yi 王毅	1953	CCP	25 July 2023	Incumbent
2	Minister of National Defense	Li Shangfu 李尚福	1958	CCP	12 March 2023	24 October 2023
2	Minister of National Defense	Dong Jun 董军	1961	CCP	29 December 2023	Incumbent
3	Chairman of the National Development and Reform Commission	Zheng Shanjie 郑栅洁	1961	CCP	12 March 2023	Incumbent
4	Minister of Education	Huai Jinpeng 怀进鹏	1962	CCP	20 August 2021	Incumbent
5	Minister of Science and Technology	Wang Zhigang 王志刚	1957	CCP	19 March 2018	24 October 2023
5	Minister of Science and Technology	Yin Hejun 阴和俊	1963	CCP	24 October 2023	Incumbent
6	Minister of Industry and Information Technology	Jin Zhuanglong 金壮龙	1964	CCP	2 September 2022	30 April 2025
6	Minister of Industry and Information Technology	Li Lecheng 李乐成	1965	CCP	30 April 2025	Incumbent
7	Director of the National Ethnic Affairs Commission	Pan Yue 潘岳	1960	CCP	24 June 2022	Incumbent
8	Minister of Public Security	Wang Xiaohong 王小洪	1957	CCP (Secretariat)	24 June 2022	Incumbent
9	Minister of State Security	Chen Yixin 陈一新	1959	CCP	30 October 2022	Incumbent
10	Minister of Civil Affairs	Tang Dengjie 唐登杰	1964	CCP	28 February 2022	29 December 2023
10	Minister of Civil Affairs	Lu Zhiyuan 陆治原	1964	CCP	29 December 2023	Incumbent
11	Minister of Justice	He Rong 贺荣	1962	CCP	24 February 2023	Incumbent
12	Minister of Finance	Liu Kun 刘昆	1956	CCP	19 March 2018	24 October 2023
12	Minister of Finance	Lan Fo'an 蓝佛安	1962	CCP	24 October 2023	Incumbent
13	Minister of Human Resources and Social Security	Wang Xiaoping 王晓萍	1964	CCP	30 December 2022	Incumbent
14	Minister of Natural Resources	Wang Guanghua 王广华	1963	CCP	24 June 2022	25 December 2024
14	Minister of Natural Resources	Guan Zhi'ou 关志鸥	1969	CCP	25 December 2024	Incumbent
15	Minister of Ecology and Environment	Huang Runqiu 黄润秋	1963	JS (vice chair)	29 April 2020	Incumbent
16	Minister of Housing and Urban–Rural Development	Ni Hong 倪虹	1962	CCP	24 June 2022	Incumbent
17	Minister of Transport	Li Xiaopeng 李小鹏	1959	CCP	3 September 2016	8 November 2024
17	Minister of Transport	Liu Wei 刘伟	1965	CCP	8 November 2024	Incumbent
18	Minister of Water Resources	Li Guoying 李国英	1963	CCP	28 February 2021	Incumbent
19	Minister of Agriculture and Rural Affairs	Tang Renjian 唐仁健	1962	CCP	26 September 2020	13 September 2024
19	Minister of Agriculture and Rural Affairs	Han Jun 韩俊	1963	CCP	13 September 2024	Incumbent
20	Minister of Commerce	Wang Wentao 王文涛	1964	CCP	26 September 2020	Incumbent
21	Minister of Culture and Tourism	Hu Heping 胡和平	1962	CCP	11 August 2020	29 December 2023
21	Minister of Culture and Tourism	Sun Yeli 孙业礼	1964	CCP	29 December 2023	Incumbent
22	Head of the National Health Commission	Ma Xiaowei 马晓伟	1959	CCP	19 March 2018	6 May 2024
22	Head of the National Health Commission	Lei Haichao 雷海潮	1968	CCP	6 May 2024	Incumbent
23	Minister of Veterans Affairs	Pei Jinjia 裴金佳	1963	CCP	24 June 2022	Incumbent
24	Minister of Emergency Management	Wang Xiangxi 王祥喜	1962	CCP	2 September 2022	26 February 2026
24	Minister of Emergency Management	Zhang Chengzhong 张成中	1970	CCP	30 April 2026	Incumbent
25	Governor of the People's Bank of China	Yi Gang 易纲	1958	CCP	19 March 2018	25 July 2023
25	Governor of the People's Bank of China	Pan Gongsheng 潘功胜	1963	CCP	25 July 2023	Incumbent
26	Auditor-General of the National Audit Office	Hou Kai 侯凯	1962	CCP	30 June 2022	Incumbent

== See also ==
- Government of China
- Generations of Chinese leadership
  - 20th National Congress of the Chinese Communist Party
- General secretaryship of Xi Jinping
  - New Zhijiang Army
