= Organic Law of the State Council =

1982 law in China

Organic Law of the State Council of the People's Republic of China

National People's Congress
- Passed by: National People's Congress
- Passed: 10 December 1982
- Signed by: Chairman Ye Jianying
- Signed: 10 December 1982
- Commenced: 10 December 1982
- Status: In force

Organic Law of the State Council
- Simplified Chinese: 中华人民共和国国务院组织法
- Traditional Chinese: 中華人民共和國國務院組織法
Transcriptions
Standard Mandarin
- Hanyu Pinyin: Zhōnghuá Rénmín Gònghéguó Guówùyuàn Zǔzhī Fǎ

The Organic Law of the State Council of the People's Republic of China is a law concerning the organization of the State Council. The law was first passed by the fifth session of the 5th National People's Congress, the national legislature, on 10 December 1982 and came into effect on that day. It was revised on 11 March 2024 by the second session of the 14th National People's Congress, including several provisions that strengthened the leadership role of the Chinese Communist Party over the State Council.

== Legislative history ==
The first session of the 1st National People's Congress passed the Organization Law of the State Council of the People's Republic of China in September 1954. The Organic Law of the State Council was adopted at the fifth session of the 5th National People's Congress on 10 December 1982, and promulgated and implemented on the same day by Chairman of the Standing Committee of the National People's Congress Ye Jianying.

On 25 December 2023, the "Draft Amendment to the Organic Law of the State Council" was submitted to the meeting for deliberation by the 7th session of the Standing Committee of the 14th National People's Congress. In December, the "Organic Law of the State Council of the People's Republic of China (Second Draft for Revision)" was released and public opinions were solicited. On 5 March 2024, at the second session of the 14th National People's Congress, NPCSC Vice Chairman Li Hongzhong made an explanation on the draft amendments. On 11 March 2024, President Xi Jinping signed Presidential Order No. 21, which stipulates that the Organic Law of the State Council has been revised and adopted at the Second Session of and will come into force on the date of promulgation. The drafts included several provisions that strengthened the leadership of the Chinese Communist Party.

== Content ==
With only 20 articles, it is the shortest state organ organic laws as well as one of the shortest laws in China. Articles 2, 3, 4, 8, 15, 16, 17, 18, 19 and 20 were added in the 2024 revision, which also amended articles 1, 6, 11, 12, 13 and 14.

Article 2 states that the "State Council of the People's Republic of China, that is, the Central People's Government, is the executive body of the highest organ of state power and is the highest organ of state administration." This section is copied from Article 95 of the Constitution.

Article 3 states the State Council will "uphold the leadership of the Chinese Communist Party" follow Marxism–Leninism, Mao Zedong Thought, Deng Xiaoping Theory, the Three Represents, the Scientific Outlook on Development, and Xi Jinping Thought on Socialism with Chinese Characteristics for a New Era and "resolutely uphold the Party Central Committee's authority and its centralized and unified leadership; resolutely implement the Party Central Committee's decisions and plans".

Article 4 states the State Council reports to the National People's Congress and its Standing Committee. It duplicates Article 92 of the Constitution.

Article 5 lays out the composition of the State Council, namely that it includes the premier, vice premiers, state councilors, ministers of the various ministries, directors of the various commissions, governor of the People's Bank of China, auditor-general, and secretary-general.

Articles 7 and 8 explain the composition and the main tasks of the plenary meetings and executive meetings of the State Council.

Article 12 explains the composition of State Council departments. Article 13 explains the role of subordinate bodies.

Article 18 states that "constituent members of the State Council shall resolutely uphold the Party Central Committee's authority and its centralized and unified leadership, obey the Constitution and laws in an exemplary manner, conscientiously discharge their responsibilities, take the lead in opposing pointless formalities and bureaucratism, serve the people and stay pragmatic, strictly observe discipline, and demonstrate diligence and integrity".

Article 19 states that the "constituent departments, directly subordinate bodies, and administrative bodies of the State Council shall perform their respective functions, bear their respective responsibilities, enhance coordination, and closely cooperate with one another to ensure that the Party Central Committee's and the State Council's work plans are implemented in all aspects".
