= Minister of Foreign Affairs (China) =

Minister of the People's Republic of China

Minister of Foreign Affairs of the People's Republic of China
- 中华人民共和国外交部部长
- National Emblem of China

- Flag of China

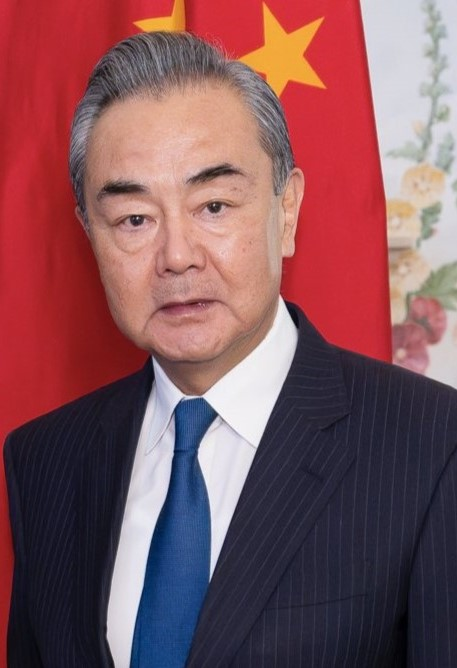
- Incumbent; Wang Yi since 25 July 2023
- Ministry of Foreign Affairs
- Status: Provincial and ministerial-level official
- Member of: Plenary Meeting of the State Council
- Reports to: Central Foreign Affairs Commission
- Seat: Ministry of Foreign Affairs Building, Chaoyang District, Beijing
- Nominator: Premier (chosen within the Chinese Communist Party)
- Appointer: President with the confirmation of the National People's Congress or its Standing Committee
- Precursor: Minister of Foreign Affairs of the Republic of China
- Formation: 1 October 1949; 76 years ago
- First holder: Zhou Enlai
- Deputy: Vice Minister of Foreign Affairs
- Website: www.mfa.gov.cn/web/wjbz_673089/

Minister of Foreign Affairs of the People's Republic of China
- Simplified Chinese: 中华人民共和国外交部部长
Transcriptions
Standard Mandarin
- Hanyu Pinyin: Zhōnghuá Rénmín Gònghéguó Wàijiāobù Bùzhǎng

Alternative Chinese name
- Simplified Chinese: 外交部部长
Transcriptions
Standard Mandarin
- Hanyu Pinyin: Wàijiāobù Bùzhǎng

The Minister of Foreign Affairs of the People's Republic of China is the head of the Ministry of Foreign Affairs of the People's Republic of China and one of the country's top and most important State Council posts. Officially, the minister is nominated by the premier of the State Council, who is then approved by the National People's Congress or its Standing Committee and appointed by the president.

The minister usually is also a member of the Central Committee of the Chinese Communist Party and a state councillor. The Minister is the second-highest ranking diplomat in China after the director of the Office of the Central Foreign Affairs Commission. The current minister is Wang Yi, who concurrently serves as the director of the Office of the Central Foreign Affairs Commission.

== History ==
The post was initially established after the proclamation of the People's Republic of China on 1 October 1949 as the minister of foreign affairs of the Central People's Government, with Zhou Enlai being appointed as both the minister and the premier.

== List of officeholders ==
No.	Portrait	Name (Birth–Death)	Term of office			Important offices held during tenure	Premier	Ref.
No.	Portrait	Name (Birth–Death)	Took office	Left office	Term	Important offices held during tenure	Premier	Ref.
Minister of Foreign Affairs of the Central People's Government
1		Zhou Enlai 周恩来 (1898–1976)	1 October 1949	28 September 1954	4 years, 362 days	Premier of the State Council	Zhou Enlai	
Minister of Foreign Affairs of the People's Republic of China
1		Zhou Enlai 周恩来 (1898–1976)	28 September 1954	11 February 1958	3 years, 136 days	Premier of the State Council; Chairman of the Chinese People's Political Consultative Conference; Vice Chairman of the Chinese Communist Party	Zhou Enlai	
2		Marshal; Chen Yi 陈毅 (1901–1972)	11 February 1958	6 January 1972	13 years, 329 days	Vice Premier of the State Council; Head of the Central Foreign Affairs Leading Group; Vice Chairman of the Chinese People's Political Consultative Conference; Vice Chairman of the CCP Central Military Commission	Zhou Enlai	
3		Ji Pengfei 姬鹏飞 (1910–2000)	6 January 1972	18 November 1973	1 year, 316 days	Head of the Party Core Group of the Ministry of Foreign Affairs	Zhou Enlai	
4		Qiao Guanhua 喬冠華 (1913–1983)	18 November 1973	2 December 1976	3 years, 14 days		Zhou Enlai; Hua Guofeng	
5		Huang Hua 黄华 (1913–2010)	2 December 1976	19 November 1982	5 years, 352 days	Vice Premier of the State Council; State Councillor	Hua Guofeng; Zhao Ziyang	
6		Wu Xueqian 吴学谦 (1921–2008)	19 November 1982	12 April 1988	5 years, 145 days	Secretary of the Party Leadership Group of the Ministry of Foreign Affairs; State Councillor; Deputy Head of the Central Foreign Affairs Leading Group	Zhao Ziyang	
7		Qian Qichen 钱其琛 (1928–2017)	12 April 1988	18 March 1998	9 years, 340 days	Vice Premier of the State Council; State Councillor	Li Peng	
8		Tang Jiaxuan 唐家璇 (born 1938)	18 March 1998	17 March 2003	4 years, 364 days	Secretary of the Party Committee of the Ministry of Foreign Affairs	Zhu Rongji	
9		Li Zhaoxing 李肇星 (born 1940)	17 March 2003	27 April 2007	4 years, 41 days		Wen Jiabao	
10		Yang Jiechi 杨洁篪 (born 1950)	27 April 2007	16 March 2013	5 years, 323 days	State Councillor	Wen Jiabao	
11		Wang Yi 王毅 (born 1953)	16 March 2013	30 December 2022	9 years, 289 days	State Councillor; Member of the CCP Politburo	Li Keqiang	
12		Qin Gang 秦刚 (born 1966)	30 December 2022	25 July 2023	207 days	Deputy Secretary of the Party Committee of the Ministry of Foreign Affairs; State Councillor		
12		Qin Gang 秦刚 (born 1966)	30 December 2022	25 July 2023	207 days	Deputy Secretary of the Party Committee of the Ministry of Foreign Affairs; State Councillor	Li Qiang	
13		Wang Yi 王毅 (born 1953)	25 July 2023	Incumbent	3 years, 44 days	Member of the CCP Politburo; Director of the Office of the Central Foreign Affairs Commission	Li Qiang	
