= Order from the State Council on the Imposition of Martial Law in Parts of Beijing =

1989 event in China

Order from the State Council of the People's Republic of China on the Imposition of Martial Law in Parts of Beijing

State Council of China
- Territorial extent: Beijing Municipality
- Passed by: State Council of China
- Passed: 20 May 1989
- Signed by: Premier Li Peng
- Signed: 20 May 1989
- Repealed: 11 January 1990
- Status: Repealed

The Order from the State Council of the People's Republic of China on the Imposition of Martial Law in Parts of Beijing was an order of the State Council of China issued by Premier Li Peng on 20 May 1989, after a meeting of the Central Committee of the Chinese Communist Party and the State Council on 19 May 1989.

== History ==
The order issued on 20 May 1989, after the Central Committee of the Chinese Communist Party and the State Council convened a meeting of central and Beijing municipal party, government and military cadres on the evening of May 19, 1989.

The order announced that martial law would be imposed in parts of Beijing starting at 10:00 a.m. that day. According to the first order of the Beijing Municipal People's Government, the areas under martial law were Dongcheng, Xicheng, Chongwen, Xuanwu, Shijingshan, Haidian, Fengtai and Chaoyang. The martial law on June 4 was an important part of the 1989 Tiananmen Square protests and massacre. Unlike the swift and strict enforcement in Lhasa, martial law was not fully enforced in parts of Beijing at first; after troops wearing only light clothing and carrying no weapons were blocked from entering the city on foot on June 2, broadcasts, propaganda vehicles, and helicopters began to repeatedly announce the martial law order. The martial law order was not officially lifted until 11 January 1990, when Premier Li Peng signed another State Council order.

=== The proclamation ===
In view of the serious unrest that has occurred in Beijing, disrupting social stability, the normal lives of the people, and social order, in order to resolutely stop the unrest, maintain social tranquility in Beijing, protect the lives and property of citizens, ensure that public property is not infringed upon, and ensure that the central government organs and the Beijing Municipal Government can perform their duties normally, in accordance with Article 89, Paragraph 16 of the Constitution of the People's Republic of China, the State Council has decided that martial law will be imposed in parts of Beijing starting at 10:00 a.m. on May 20, 1989. The Beijing Municipal People's Government will organize and implement the martial law measures and take specific measures as needed.

— Premier Li Peng, 20 May 1989

== Reactions ==
On May 22, the People's Daily published a headline in bold characters in the lower right corner of the front page: "No use of the army to solve domestic problems." Lu Chaoqi, then deputy editor-in-chief of the People's Daily, explained: "The news article 'No use of the army to solve domestic problems' by Hungarian Prime Minister Németh was originally placed in the international section by the Ministry of National Defense. When I looked at the proof, I saw in the text: 'One of the most hateful features of the Stalinist model is the arbitrary use of armed forces to suppress one's own people. We should break with this practice in the most resolute way...' This sentence is very relevant to us, so we decided to move this news to the front page. Some people may be unhappy after reading it."

Because Li Peng signed the martial law order without going through the process of Article 4 of the Organic Law of the State Council, which states that "major issues in the work of the State Council must be discussed and decided by the State Council Executive Meeting or the State Council Plenary Meeting," the order has been criticized by critics as a "major issue" that was not discussed at a meeting and therefore unconstitutional and illegal. In contrast, the State Council Order on the Implementation of Martial Law in Lhasa, Tibet Autonomous Region, issued on March 7 of the same year, was implemented only after a meeting of the State Council, while the martial law in Beijing was not.
