= Gov.cn =

Official website of the Government of China

gov.cn
- Native name: 中国政府网
- Website type: Government
- Available in: Mandarin Chinese (Simplified, Traditional); English
- Owner: State Council of China
- Parent: China Government Network Operation Center
- Website: www.gov.cn; english.www.gov.cn
- Commercial: No
- Registration: None
- Launched: January 1, 2006; 20 years ago
- Current status: Active

Gov.cn
- Simplified Chinese: 中华人民共和国中央人民政府门户网站
- Traditional Chinese: 中華人民共和國中央人民政府入口網站
Transcriptions
Standard Mandarin
- Hanyu Pinyin: Zhōnghuá Rénmín Gònghéguó Zhōngyāng Rénmín Zhèngfǔ Ménhù Wǎngzhàn

Alternative Chinese name
- Simplified Chinese: 中国政府网
- Traditional Chinese: 中國政府網
Transcriptions
Standard Mandarin
- Hanyu Pinyin: Zhōngguó Zhèngfǔ Wǎng

gov.cn is the official website of the State Council of the People's Republic of China. Hosted by the General Office of the State Council, gov.cn was launched on a trial basis on 1 October 2005 and officially launched on 1 January 2006. The website is available in Simplified Chinese, Traditional Chinese and English.

== History ==
gov.cn was launched on trial on 1 October 2005 and officially launched on 1 January 2006. On 11 October 2013, the official Xinhua Weibo, Tencent Weibo and WeChat accounts of the Chinese Government Website were launched, and on December 18, its Weibo account was launched. On 28 February 2014, the new version of the Chinese Government Website was launched, with a sky blue and white background, and a new set of simpler columns. In March, the Chinese Government Website launched the "I want to say something to the Premier" column, where netizens can send good opinions and suggestions directly to the Premier's desk. On 8 October, the new English version of the Chinese Government Website was also officially launched. The mobile client of the Chinese government website (State Council client) was launched on 26 February 2016.

== Content ==
The self-introduction and definition of the gov.cn is: "The Chinese Government Network is a comprehensive platform for the State Council and its departments, as well as the people's governments of provinces, autonomous regions, and municipalities directly under the central government, to publish government information and provide online services on the Internet."

== Domain name standard ==
China has a standard regulating the use of government domain names, including subdomains of gov.cn:

1. The domain names of provincial governments (and other ones at the same level, e.g., municipalities directly under the central government, autonomous regions) use the format www.abbreviatedname.gov.cn;
2. The domain names for the prefecture governments (also cities and leagues) use the format www.fullname.gov.cn;
3. The domain names for the county/district governments use the format www.abbreviatednameofprovince+fullnameofcounty.gov.cn

All domain name use geographical names expressed in Hanyu Pinyin, for the minority regions, the Pinyin translation from the minority language is used as approved by the Naming Department of the Ministry of Civil Affairs.

== Sources ==
- Shi, Y. (2007). Improving E-Government Services Should Start with Domain Names: A Longitudinal Study of Chinese E-Government Domain Names. 2007 IEEE International Conference on Service Operations and Logistics, and Informatics. doi:10.1109/SOLI.2007.4383938.
