= Tang Jiaxuan =

Chinese diplomat and politician

- 唐家璇
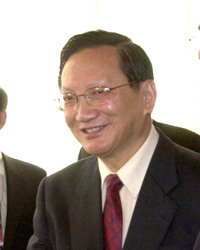
- Tang in 2002

State Councilor of China
- In office 17 March 2003 – 17 March 2008 Serving with Chen Zhili, Hua Jianmin, Cao Gangchuan, Zhou Yongkang
- Premier: Wen Jiabao

8th Minister of Foreign Affairs
- In office 17 March 1998 – 17 March 2003
- Premier: Zhu Rongji
- Preceded by: Qian Qichen
- Succeeded by: Li Zhaoxing

Personal details
- Born: 17 January 1938 (age 88) Zhenjiang, Jiangsu, Republic of China
- Party: Chinese Communist Party
- Education: Fudan University; Peking University
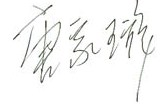
- Signature

Tang Jiaxuan (Chinese: 唐家璇; pinyin: Táng Jiāxuán; born January 17, 1938) is a Chinese diplomat and politician who was foreign minister of the People's Republic of China from 1998–2003. After various diplomatic postings in Japan, he became Assistant to the Minister of Foreign Affairs in 1991, Vice Minister of Foreign Affairs in 1993 and Minister of Foreign Affairs from 1998 to 2003. He continued to serve on the State Council until 2008.

== Early life and education ==
Tang was born on 17 January 1938 in Zhenjiang, Jiangsu. In 1955, he entered Fudan University to study English, and in 1958, he moved to Peking University to study Japanese under a Foreign Ministry programme, graduating in 1962.

== Early career ==
From 1962 to 1964, Tang was a trainee in the Japanese-language section of the foreign service department of the Broadcasting Administration. In 1964, he joined the translation department of the Ministry of Foreign Affairs. He later worked at the Chinese People's Association for Friendship with Foreign Countries and served on the council of the China-Japan Friendship Association. He joined the Chinese Communist Party in 1973.

From 1978, Tang served as second secretary and then first secretary at the Chinese embassy in Japan. In 1983, he became deputy director of the office of the party's leading group for rectification in the foreign affairs bodies of the state. From May 1985 to April 1988, he was deputy director-general of the Foreign Ministry's Department of Asian Affairs, and from April 1988 to December 1991, he was minister-counsellor and then minister at the embassy in Japan.

== Assistant and vice minister ==
Tang became assistant foreign minister in December 1991 and vice foreign minister in March 1993, with responsibility for Asian affairs, consular work and protocol. He led China's boundary talks with Vietnam, India and Bhutan. In September 1993, he signed an agreement with India on maintaining peace along the Line of Actual Control, and in October 1993, he signed an agreement with Vietnam on the basic principles for settling their boundary issues. He led the Chinese delegation to a ministerial meeting of the Non-Aligned Movement in Indonesia in April 1995, and from 1995 to 1997, he led China's vice-ministerial consultations with the Association of Southeast Asian Nations.

== Minister of Foreign Affairs ==
Tang meets President of Russia Vladimir Putin (2001)

On 18 March 1998, Tang succeeded Qian Qichen as China's eighth Minister of Foreign Affairs. He was a member of the 15th and 16th Central Committees. On 4 June 1998, he chaired a meeting of the foreign ministers of the five permanent members of the United Nations Security Council on the nuclear tests carried out by India and Pakistan. Later that year, he visited five African countries, attended the ASEAN Regional Forum in Manila, addressed the United Nations General Assembly and visited the United States and Canada. He held talks in Washington on 1 October 1998.

After NATO aircraft struck the Chinese embassy in Belgrade on 7 May 1999, the US Secretary of State Madeleine Albright wrote to Tang on 8 May with an apology. Tang demanded an official apology from NATO, an open and detailed inquiry and the punishment of those responsible. On 10 May, he lodged a serious protest and set out four demands to the US government. He met Albright on 25 July 1999, and the two governments later agreed on compensation for the bombing.

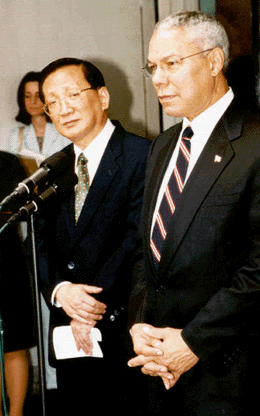
Tang with US Secretary of State Colin Powell (2001)

In March 2000, Tang told the US envoy Richard Holbrooke that the United States should recognise the "sensitivity and complexity" of the Taiwan problem and stay out of China's internal affairs. During his visit to Washington in September 2001, he said in a speech that China was "vigorously pushing forward the unification process", and that "as long as the Taiwan authorities agree to resolving the Taiwan question on the basis of 'one China', we can wait patiently". Powell denied reports that the United States had agreed to reduce its commitment to Taiwan in return for China's help against terrorism, saying, "There was no suggestion of a quid pro quo." In late February 2000, Tang held two days of talks in Moscow with the Russian Foreign Minister Igor Ivanov and the acting president Vladimir Putin, and the two sides signed two minor agreements on travel between their countries. Putin said that the relationship between the two countries had "a global nature". In April 2001, Tang returned to Moscow for talks with Ivanov on military cooperation and on the draft of the Treaty of Good-Neighbourliness and Friendly Cooperation, which was to be signed by President Jiang Zemin, and he attended a meeting of the foreign ministers of the Shanghai Five. In January 2003, Tang and Ivanov met at the United Nations, where they agreed on the need for a political solution to the Iraq issue within the framework of the UN and for a nuclear-free Korean Peninsula.

In April 2001, after a US Navy surveillance aircraft collided with a Chinese fighter jet near Hainan in the Hainan Island incident, the stand-off over the detained American crew ended after the US ambassador Joseph Prueher sent Tang a letter in which the United States said that it was "very sorry". In August 2001, Tang warned that a visit by the Japanese Prime Minister Junichiro Koizumi to the Yasukuni Shrine on 15 August would draw strong criticism from the Chinese people and could undermine the foundation of friendly relations between the two countries.

On 20 and 21 September 2001, shortly after the September 11 attacks, Tang visited Washington, where he met President George W. Bush and the US Secretary of State Colin Powell and promised China's cooperation against terrorism. After their meeting, Tang described his talks with Powell as "useful, constructive and successful". According to Powell, the talks covered the sharing of information but not military cooperation. China did not pledge to take part in US military action, and it urged that the United Nations be consulted before any such action was taken.

== State Councilor ==
Tang with Indian Minister of External Affairs Natwar Singh (2004)

In March 2003, Tang became a state councilor in the government of Premier Wen Jiabao, and he held the post until March 2008. In February 2006, the Japanese Chief Cabinet Secretary Shinzo Abe criticised remarks attributed to Tang, who was quoted as saying that China had "no longer any expectation" of Koizumi.

In October 2006, after North Korea's nuclear test, Tang met President George W. Bush in Washington and visited Moscow, and on 19 October, he visited Pyongyang as Hu Jintao's special envoy, where he met Kim Jong Il and delivered a personal message from Hu. According to the Chinese Foreign Ministry, Kim told Tang that North Korea was willing to return to the six-party talks but reserved the right to take further action if it faced pressure. Tang told the US Secretary of State Condoleezza Rice that his visit "has not been in vain".

== Later career ==
Minister of Foreign Affairs of Japan Kōichirō Genba meeting Tang (2012)

After leaving office, Tang became chairman of the Chinese side of the China-Japan Friendship Committee for the 21st Century, an advisory body to the two governments. Opening the first meeting of its fifth session in February 2010, he said that in his diplomatic career of more than 47 years, he had been involved with Japan more than with any other country. He also became an honorary adviser to the China-Japan Friendship Association, a senior adviser to the Chinese People's Institute of Foreign Affairs and honorary chairman of the Translators Association of China.

== Publications ==
Tang wrote a memoir of his diplomatic career, Jing Yu Xu Feng. An English translation was published by HarperCollins in 2011 as Heavy Storm and Gentle Breeze: A Memoir of China's Diplomacy.

Government offices
Preceded by Qian Qichen	Foreign Minister of the People's Republic of China; 1998–2003	Succeeded by Li Zhaoxing
