= Qian Qichen =

Chinese diplomat

- 钱其琛
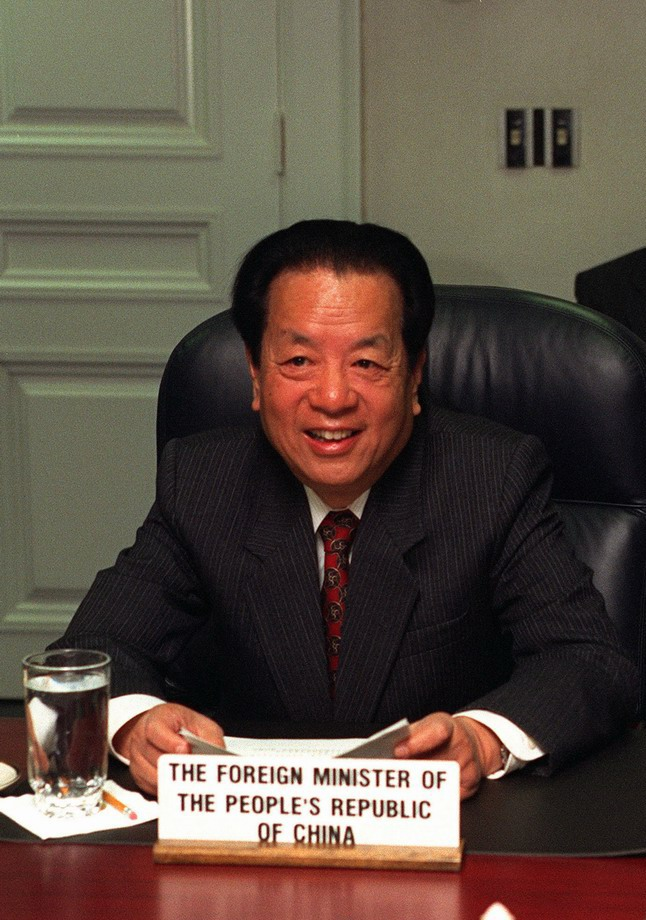
- Qian in 1997

Vice Premier of China
- In office 25 March 1993 – 17 March 2003
- Premier: Li Peng; Zhu Rongji

7th Minister of Foreign Affairs
- In office 12 April 1988 – 18 March 1998
- Premier: Li Peng
- Preceded by: Wu Xueqian
- Succeeded by: Tang Jiaxuan

Personal details
- Born: 5 January 1928 British Tianjin
- Died: 9 May 2017 (aged 89) Beijing, People's Republic of China
- Party: Chinese Communist Party (joined in 1942)
- Spouse: Zhou Hanqiong (周寒琼)
- Children: 2

Chinese name
- Traditional Chinese: 錢其琛
- Simplified Chinese: 钱其琛
Transcriptions
Standard Mandarin
- Hanyu Pinyin: Qián Qíchēn
- Wade–Giles: Ch'ien Ch'i-ch'en

Qian Qichen (Chinese: 钱其琛; pinyin: Qián Qíchēn; 5 January 1928 – 9 May 2017) was a Chinese diplomat and politician. He served as Chinese Communist Party (CCP) Politburo member from 1992 to 2002, China's Foreign Minister from April 1988 to March 1998, and as Vice Premier from March 1993 to March 2003. Since then, no other diplomat-turned-politician has attained such a lofty status in China's political hierarchy. Qian played a critical role in shaping China's foreign policy during CCP general secretary Jiang Zemin's administration, and was a key player handling the return to Chinese sovereignty of Hong Kong and Macau. He was in charge of border negotiations with the Soviet Union in the 1980s, resulting in a successful settlement of the border dispute and the thawing of the relations between China and Russia. He was also instrumental in handling China's normalization of relations with the West in the difficult period after the Tiananmen Square protests of 1989.

== Life and career ==
Qian Qichen hailed from a prominent scholarly family from Waigang (外冈), Jiading, Jiangsu province (now in Shanghai). He was a descendant of the celebrated Qing dynasty historian Qian Daxin. He was born in Tianjin on 5 January 1928.

From 1942 to 1945, Qian attended the Utopia University High School in Shanghai. He secretly joined the Chinese Communist Party in 1942 at the age of 14. From 1945 to 1949 he worked at the Ta Kung Pao newspaper. After the establishment of the People's Republic of China in 1949, he was member of the Party Committee and Secretary of the Communist Youth League Committees of the Xuhui, Changning, and Yangpu districts of Shanghai.

Qian left for the Soviet Union and studied at the Komsomol Central School in Moscow from 1954 to 1955. From 1955 to 1963, he worked as a diplomat in Moscow. He successively served as Second Secretary in the Chinese Embassy, Director of Department of Overseas Chinese Students and Deputy Director General of the Foreign Department of the Ministry of Higher Education, and Counsellor in the Chinese Embassy.

During the Cultural Revolution, Qian was persecuted and sent to perform hard labour at a May Seventh Cadre School from 1966 to 1972. After his political rehabilitation, he served as Ambassador to Guinea (1974–76) and concurrently Ambassador to Guinea-Bissau (1974–75). He went to work at the Ministry of Foreign Affairs in 1977 and was vice-minister of foreign affairs from 1982 to 1988 and minister from 1988 to 1998. He was Vice Premier of the State Council, under Premiers Li Peng and Zhu Rongji, from 1993 until his retirement in 2003.

While serving as Director of the Information Department of the Foreign Ministry from 1977 to 1982, he proposed establishing a spokesperson system and became the first spokesperson of the Ministry.

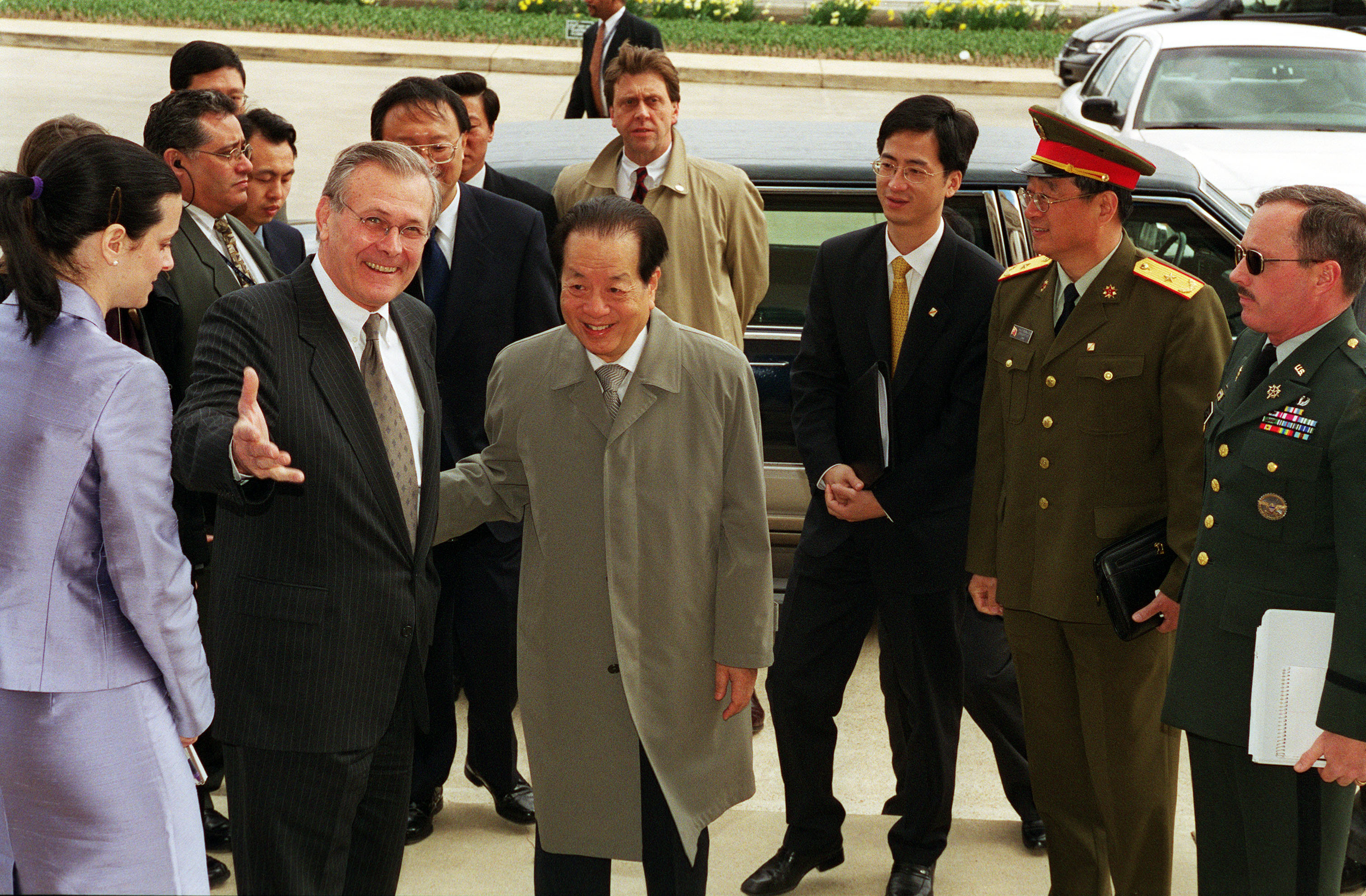
Donald Rumsfeld welcomes Vice Premier Qian Qichen as he arrives at the Pentagon on March 22, 2001

Qian became Foreign Minister in April 1988. As Foreign Minister, Qian played a critical role in shaping China's foreign policy during CCP general secretary Jiang Zemin's administration, and was a key player handling the return to Chinese sovereignty of Hong Kong and Macau. He was in charge of border negotiations with the Soviet Union in the 1980s, which resulted in a successful settlement of the border dispute and the thawing of the bilateral relations between China and Russia.

He was also instrumental in handling China's normalization of relations with the West in the difficult period after the Tiananmen Square protests of 1989; his meeting with then British Foreign Secretary John Major in July 1989 was the first such contact. In October 1989, Qian engaged in low-profile outreach when he attended the annual UN General Assembly in New York, seeking to reassure his listeners that China would proceed with reform.

He was the first Chinese diplomat to attend an ASEAN event, going to the 1991 ASEAN Foreign Ministers Meeting in Malaysia. This marked the first time China formally acknowledged ASEAN as an institution and laid the groundwork for future ASEAN-China cooperation, like the ASEAN+3 mechanism and the ASEAN-China Free Trade Area (ACFTA).

In 1992, he was tasked with traveling to Pyongyang, North Korea to inform Kim Il Sung that China would be establishing formal diplomatic relations with South Korea. In 1995, Qian proposed a seven point policy in regards to Hong Kong's relations with Taiwan after its handover to China.

Qian was a member of the 12th to 15th CCP Central Committee. He was a member of the 14th and 15th CCP Politburo.

In November 2005, Qian was awarded the Order of the Polar Star, the highest civilian award of Mongolia, for his contributions to China–Mongolia relations.

== Personal life ==
Qian was fluent in Russian and English, and understood some French. He was married to Zhou Hanqiong (周寒琼). They had a son and a daughter. He published a memoir in 2004, entitled Ten Episodes in China's Diplomacy (外交十记).

== Death ==
Qian died of illness on 9 May 2017 in Beijing, at the age of 89. His funeral and subsequent cremation at Babaoshan Revolutionary Cemetery was attended by CCP General Secretary Xi Jinping, former CCP General Secretary Hu Jintao, Premier Li Keqiang, former Premier Li Peng and other CCP Politburo Standing Committee members including Zhang Dejiang, Yu Zhengsheng, Liu Yunshan, Wang Qishan and Zhang Gaoli, and Chief Executive of Hong Kong Leung Chun-ying and Hong Kong and Hong Kong and Macau Affairs Office director Wang Guangya. Former CCP General Secretary Jiang Zemin did not attend Qian's funeral ceremony, but sent a wreath.

He was officially eulogized as "an excellent Communist Party member, a time-tested and loyal communist soldier, a proletarian revolutionist, and an outstanding diplomat."

Government offices
Preceded by Wu Xueqian	Foreign Minister of the People's Republic of China; 1988–1998	Succeeded by Tang Jiaxuan
