= Government work report =

Annual report of the People's Republic of China government

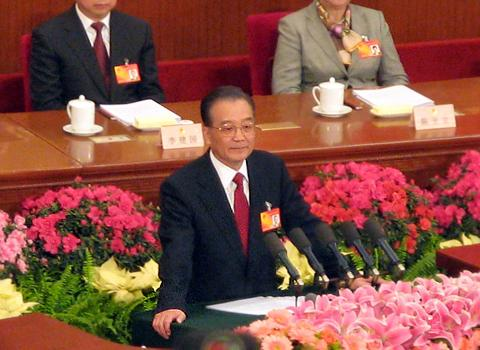
Premier Wen Jiabao delivering the government work report on behalf of the State Council at the third session of the 11th National People's Congress.

A government work report (Chinese: 政府工作报告; pinyin: Zhèngfǔ gōngzuò bàogào) is a type of government document in the People's Republic of China (PRC). People's governments at all levels issue this report to the presidium of the local people's congress, deputies to the people's congresses and members of the local committees of the Chinese People's Political Consultative Conference attending the meeting at the local people's congress held annually. At the national level, the premier delivers the government work report to the National People's Congress on behalf of the State Council.

== History ==
In September 1954, Premier Zhou Enlai delivered the first government work report to the first session of the 1st National People's Congress. Starting from the fourth session of the 5th National People's Congress in 1981, the premier started delivering the work report on behalf of the government. In 1978, with the beginning of reform and opening up, the government work report was translated into English for the first time. Since then, the report has also been translated to French, Spanish, Arabic, Russian, German, Japanese and other languages.

== Description ==
According to the Constitution, governments at all levels must report their work to the people's congresses at the same level.

=== Premier's government work report ===
The premier delivers a government work report at the annual session of the NPC during the Two Sessions. The report gives a comprehensive view of China's economic and social development in the previous year and lays out general guidelines for government policies for the current year. It is drafted under the leadership of the premier and mainly by the personnel within the State Council Research Office. Its preparation takes three stages: drafting and preparation, forming a discussion draft, soliciting opinions, revision and improvement, submission to the conference, and formal review The drafting of the government work report and soliciting opinions and making revisions generally takes two to three months before its submission to the NPC. The report generally includes the review of the previous year's work, overall deployment of this year's work, and key work tasks for this year. It also includes content on diplomacy and the international situation. In a year of the change of government every five years, the report also adds a section about the "Review of Work in the Past Five Years" section to summarize the overall work of the current government over the past five years. The NPC votes whether to approve the government work report.
