= Chen Junsheng =

Chinese politician (1927–2002)

- 陈俊生

State Councilor of China
- In office 1988–1998
- Premier: Li Peng

7th Secretary-General of the State Council
- In office 1985–1988
- Preceded by: Tian Jiyun
- Succeeded by: Luo Gan

Personal details
- Born: June 1927 Huanan County, Heilongjiang, China
- Died: 8 August 2002 (aged 75) Beijing
- Party: Chinese Communist Party

Chen Junsheng (Chinese: 陈俊生; June 1927 – 8 August 2002) was a Chinese politician. As a provincial official in Heilongjiang in the early 1980s, he distinguished himself as an advocate of the household responsibility system, resulting in the implementation of the reform in China's last bastion of collective agriculture. Consequently, he was elevated to the national government and served as Secretary-General of the State Council (1985–1988), State Councillor (1988–1998), and Vice Chairman of the Chinese People's Political Consultative Conference (1998–2002).

== Early life and career ==
Chen was born in June 1927 in Huanan County, Heilongjiang province. During the Chinese Civil War, he was a member of the Mass Movement Group in Yilan County from 1946 to 1948, and was in charge of organizational affairs in Yidong County.

After the founding of the People's Republic of China, from 1950 to 1957 he worked in the publicity department of Suihua, Fuyu, and Keshan counties, and became party secretary of Keshan. During the Cultural Revolution, he suffered from persecution between 1967 and 1973.

== Heilongjiang provincial committee ==
From 1973 to 1981, he served as deputy director and then director of the Heilongjiang Party Committee Policy Research Office, deputy director and director of the General Office of the Provincial Party Committee, member of the provincial party standing committee and secretary-general of Heilongjiang Party Committee, and party secretary of Qiqihar City.

From 1981 to 1984, Chen served as party secretary (then equivalent to deputy party chief) of Heilongjiang Province. In the early 1980s, when the rest of China was implementing the household responsibility system, Heilongjiang's party chief Yang Yichen resisted the reform and the province was the last bastion of collective agriculture. Chen, a supporter of the reform, conducted an investigation in Nenjiang Prefecture in 1982, and concluded in his report that peasants supported household contracts because they directly rewarded their work and prevented abuse by officials and egalitarianism. Chen's work, together with another official's investigation of conditions in other provinces, caused Yang to change his position. In a meeting in January 1983, Chen's report was approved by the provincial party committee and propagated as a policy guide. A month later, Yang lost his job as the province's party chief. He was later appointed procurator-general of the Supreme People's Procuratorate in an ostensible "promotion".

== National government ==
Because of his advocacy of the rural household responsibility reform, Yang was transferred to the central government in Beijing. From 1984 to 1985 Chen was vice president of the All-China Federation of Trade Unions and deputy director of the Rural Policy Research Office under the CPC Central Committee. He became Secretary-General of the State Council from 1985 to 1988, and served as a vice-premier-level State Councillor from 1988 to 1998. He became a Vice Chairman of the Chinese People's Political Consultative Conference in 1998, serving until his death in 2002. He was a member of the 13th and 14th Central Committees of the Chinese Communist Party.

Chen died in Beijing on 8 August 2002.
