= Party Group of the State Council Organs =

Chinese Communist Party body

- 中国共产党国务院机关党组
- Formation: 1955
- Type: Party group
- Location: Beijing
- Secretary: Wu Zhenglong
- Parent organization: Central Committee of the Chinese Communist Party

The Party Group of the State Council Organs is a party group of the Chinese Communist Party (CCP) within the State Council. It was established with the approval of the CCP Central Committee.

== History ==
In 1954, the State Council was established at the first session of the 1st National People's Congress. In October 1954, with the approval of the CCP Central Committee, the Party Group of the Secretariat of the State Council of the CCP was established. In January 1955, with the approval of the CCP Central Committee, the Party Group of the State Council of the CCP was established again. After the smashing of the Gang of Four, the central government system, the united front system and the mass organizations system successively restored and established party groups or party committees. The party group of the State Council of the CCP was also restored in August 1980.

== Functions ==
The Party Group of the State Council of the CCP works under the leadership of the Leading Party Members Group of the State Council.

== Members ==
=== Party Group of the State Council ===
Secretary

- Xi Zhongxun (January 1955 – June 1963)
- Zhou Rongxin (June 1963 – February 1965, acting; February 1965 – May 1966)

Deputy Secretary

- Qi Yanming (January 1955 – June 1963)
- Zeng Yifan (1960 – February 1965)
- Zhao Shougong (1960 – January 1965)
- Zhao Pengfei (February 1965 – May 1966)
- Tong Xiaopeng (February 1965 – May 1966)

=== Party Group of the General Office of the State Council ===
Secretary

- Chang Lifu (October 1954 – August 1959)
- Yang Fangzhi (August 1959 – May 1966)

=== Party Group of the State Council ===
;Secretary
- Ji Pengfei (August–November 1980, Secretary-General)
- Du Xingyuan (November 1980 – August 1983, Deputy Secretary-General and Secretary-General)
- Tian Jiyun (August 1983 – October 1985, Secretary-General)
- Chen Junsheng (October 1985 – July 1988, Secretary-General)
- Luo Gan (January 1991 – March 1998, Secretary-General)
- Wang Zhongyu (March 1998 – March 2003, Secretary-General)
- Hua Jianmin (March 2003 – March 2008, Secretary-General)
- Ma Kai (March 2008 – March 2013, Secretary General)
- Yang Jing (March 2013 – October 2017, Secretary-General)
- Xiao Jie (October 2017 – March 2023, Deputy Secretary-General, Secretary-General, and concurrently Secretary of the Working Committee of the Central Government Departments )
- Wu Zhenglong (March 2023 –, Secretary General)

Deputy Secretary

- Du Xingyuan (August–November 1980, Deputy Secretary-General)
- Song Yiping (August 1980 – August 1983, Deputy Secretary-General)
- Ai Zhisheng (December 1984 – April 1985, Deputy Secretary-General)
- Li Hao (December 1984 – August 1985, Deputy Secretary-General)
- Liu Suinian (August 1985 – January 1986, Deputy Secretary-General)
- Bai Meiqing (December 1985 – July 1988, Deputy Secretary-General)
- Ma Zhongchen (March–June 1987, Deputy Secretary-General, did not take office)
- Liu Zhongli (January 1991 – September 1992, Deputy Secretary-General)
- He Chunlin (January 1991 – March 1998, Deputy Secretary-General) (clearly designated as a ministerial-level official in 1991)
- Jin Renqing (March–October 1995, Deputy Secretary-General)
- Zhou Zhengqing (June 1995 – March 1998, Deputy Secretary-General)
- Zhang Kezhi (March 1998 – ?, Deputy Secretary-General)
- Ma Kai (Deputy Secretary-General, 2000–2003)
- Wang Yang (Deputy Secretary-General, 2003–2005) (Ministerial level)
- Zhang Ping (December 2005 – March 2008, Deputy Secretary-General) (Ministerial level)
- Jiao Huancheng (September 13, 2007 – October 2015, Deputy Secretary-General) (Ministerial level)
- Xiao Jie (Deputy Secretary-General, 2013–2016) (Ministerial level)
- Ding Xuedong (February 2017 – Deputy Secretary-General) (Ministerial level)

Members

- Wang Fulin (Deputy Secretary-General, 1980–1983)
- Tian Jiyun (1981–1983, Deputy Secretary-General)
- Zhang Wenshou (December 1984 – May 1988, Deputy Secretary-General)
- Wang Shuming (November 1985 – June 1993, Deputy Secretary-General)
- Li Chang'an (June 1987 – 1993, Deputy Secretary-General)
- Chang Jie (Deputy Secretary-General, 1987-September 1990)
- Xu Zhijian (?-1996, Deputy Secretary-General)
- An Chengxin (?-May 1993, Deputy Secretary-General)
- Xi Dehua (January 1991 – May 1995, Deputy Secretary-General)
- Zhang Kezhi (June 1993 – March 1998, Deputy Secretary-General)
- Liu Qibao (1994–2000, Deputy Secretary-General)
- Zhang Zuoji (November 1994 – March 1998, Deputy Secretary-General)
- Shi Xiushi (August 1996 – December 2000, Deputy Secretary-General)
- Cui Zhanfu (August 1996 – December 2002, Deputy Secretary-General)
- Xu Rongkai (March 1998 – May 2001, Deputy Secretary-General)
- Ma Kai (Deputy Secretary-General, 1998–2000)
- Xu Shaoshi (December 2000 – April 2007, Deputy Secretary-General)
- You Quan (Deputy Secretary-General, 2000–2006)
- Gao Qiang (Deputy Secretary-General, 2001–2003)
- Jiao Huancheng (February 2003 – September 2007, Deputy Secretary-General)
- Chen Jinyu (May 2003 – April 2008, Deputy Secretary-General)
- Zhang Yong (December 2003 – February 2010, Deputy Secretary-General)
- Li Shishi (December 2003 – February 2008, Deputy Secretary-General)
- Xiang Zhaolun (December 2006 – April 2013, Deputy Secretary-General)
- Lou Jiwei (March–October 2007, Deputy Secretary-General)
- Wang Yongqing (January 2008 – June 2012, Deputy Secretary-General; April 2013 – present, Deputy Secretary-General)
- Wang Yong (March–September 2008, Deputy Secretary-General)
- Qiu Xiaoxiong (March 2008 – May 2011, Deputy Secretary-General)
- Bi Jingquan (March 2008 – January 2015, Deputy Secretary-General)
- Wang Xuejun (July 2008 – March 2013, Deputy Secretary-General) (clearly designated as a ministerial-level official in September 2010)
- Xiao Yaqing (February 2009 – February 2016, Deputy Secretary-General)
- Yan Jinghua (December 2008 – June 2015, and served as the head of the Discipline Inspection Group of the Party Committee of the agency until March 2015)
- Jiang Xiaojuan (June 2011 – June 2018, Deputy Secretary-General)
- Ding Xiangyang (March 2013 – April 2021, Deputy Secretary-General)
- Shu Xiaoqin (April 2013 – April 2020, Deputy Secretary-General)
- Wang Zhongwei (April 2013 – September 2015, Deputy Secretary-General)
- Xin Weiguang (March 2015 – March 2020, Head of the Discipline Inspection Group of the Central Commission for Discipline Inspection stationed at the General Office of the State Council)
- Jiang Zelin (April 2015 – January 2018, Deputy Secretary-General)
- Meng Yang (May 2015 –, Deputy Secretary-General)
- Peng Shujie (December 2015 –, Deputy Secretary-General)
- Li Baorong (March 2017 – June 2022, Deputy Secretary-General)
- Gao Yu (July 2017 – November 2021, Director of the General Office of the State Council; Deputy Secretary-General since October 2019)
- Lu Junhua (June 2018 – August 2021, Deputy Secretary-General)
- Liu Shi (March 2020 –, Head of the Discipline Inspection and Supervision Group of the Central Commission for Discipline Inspection and the National Supervisory Commission stationed at the General Office of the State Council)
- Li Wenzhang (April 2020 –, Deputy Secretary-General)
- Liu Jianbo (May 2021 –, Deputy Secretary-General)
- Guo Wei (July 2021 –, Deputy Secretary-General)
- Wang Zhiqing (November 2021 –, Deputy Secretary-General)
