= Executive meeting of the State Council =

Statutory meeting of the People's Republic of China government

- Simplified Chinese: 国务院常务会议
- Traditional Chinese: 國務院常務會議
Transcriptions
Standard Mandarin
- Hanyu Pinyin: Guówùyuàn ChángwùHuìyì

An executive meeting is a meeting of the State Council of the People's Republic of China. It consists of the premier, vice premiers, state councilors, and the secretary-general and meets two to three times a month.

== Functions ==
The executive meeting consists of the premier, vice premiers, state councilors, and the secretary-general. It usually runs bi-annually and when necessary, non-members can be invited to participate. It is held two to three times a month, and can be called at the discretion of the premier. Before changes to the State Council Working Rules in 2023, the meeting was held weekly. According to the State Council Organic Law, the main tasks of the meeting are "discussing draft laws, deliberating draft administrative regulations, as well as discussing, deciding on, and circulating important matters in the State Council’s work".

== Current executive meeting ==
Members of the Executive Meeting of the 14th State Council (March 2023 – March 2028)
#	Office	Portrait	Name	Party	Party memberships
1	Premier		Li Qiang 李强	CCP	Politburo Standing Committee Secretary, Leading Party Members Group
2	Vice Premier (first-ranked)		Ding Xuexiang 丁薛祥	CCP	Politburo Standing Committee Deputy Secretary, Leading Party Members Group
3	Vice Premier		He Lifeng 何立峰	CCP	Politburo Leading Party Members Group
4	Vice Premier		Zhang Guoqing 张国清	CCP	Politburo Leading Party Members Group
5	Vice Premier		Liu Guozhong 刘国中	CCP	Politburo Leading Party Members Group
6	State Councillor Minister of Public Security		Wang Xiaohong 王小洪	CCP	Secretariat Deputy Secretary, Central Political and Legal Affairs Commission Leading Party Members Group
7	State Councillor Secretary-General of the State Council		Wu Zhenglong 吴政隆	CCP	Leading Party Members Group Secretary, Party Group of the State Council Organs
8	State Councillor		Shen Yiqin 谌贻琴	CCP	Leading Party Members Group
