= Leading Party Members Group of the State Council =

Organization of the Chinese Communist Party

- 中国共产党国务院党组
- Formation: 1998
- Type: Party group
- Location: Beijing
- Leader: Li Qiang
- Deputy Leader: Ding Xuexiang
- Members: He Lifeng, Zhang Guoqing, Liu Guozhong, Wang Xiaohong, Wu Zhenglong, Shen Yiqin
- Parent organization: Central Committee of the Chinese Communist Party

Leading Party Members Group of the State Council
- Simplified Chinese: 中国共产党中国人民政治协商会议全国委员会党组
Transcriptions
Standard Mandarin
- Hanyu Pinyin: Zhōngguó Gòngchǎndǎng Zhōngguó Rénmín Zhèngzhì Xiéshāng Huìyì Guánguó Wěiyuánhuì Dǎngzǔ

The Leading Party Members Group of the State Council is a party group set up under the Central Committee of the Chinese Communist Party in the State Council of the People's Republic of China.

== History ==
The Leading Party Members Group of the State Council was established in 1998.

== Functions ==
The Party Group is responsible for overseeing the implementation of CCP Central Committee policies in the State Council. A Politburo meeting in October 2017 after the first plenary session of the 19th CCP Central Committee stipulated that the Leading Party Members Group must report its work to the Politburo and its Standing Committee every year. The Party Group is generally led by the premier, with vice premiers and state councillors serving as members.

== See also ==
- Organization of the Chinese Communist Party
