= Zhou Liangen =

Chinese politician

Zhou Liange
- 周连根

Vice-Mayor of Kaifeng
- In office March 2014 – October 2014

Vice-Mayor of Hebi
- In office August 2012 – March 2014

Personal details
- Born: November 1965 (age 60) Xichuan County, Henan, China
- Party: Chinese Communist Party
- Education: Zhengzhou University

Chinese name
- Traditional Chinese: 周連根
- Simplified Chinese: 周连根
Transcriptions
Standard Mandarin
- Hanyu Pinyin: Zhōu Liángēn

Zhou Liangen (born November 1965) is a former Chinese politician from Henan province. He was investigated by the Central Commission for Discipline Inspection of the Chinese Communist Party (CCP) in November 2014. As of 2014 November, Zhou served as vice-mayor of Kaifeng, and concurrently the head of the Kaifeng Municipal Public Security Bureau, essentially the city's police chief. During his time serving as vice mayor and the head of the police department, his achievements of lowering the city's crime rate and improving the community's sense of security have been acknowledged by the people and colleagues who were later asked to assist with the investigation.

In his early years of his career, Zhou has worked with Qin Yuhai, the former vice-governor of Henan who were taken down in 2014 as part the so-called anti-corruption campaign, as known as a major political retaliation by CCP general secretary Xi Jinping who took stage in 2014 . Due to previous work relationship, Zhou among other previous officials who worked under him were detained illegally in disguise of "anti-corruption" to put more pressure on Qin Yuhai.

== Life and career ==
Zhou was born and raised in Xichuan County, Henan. He entered Zhengzhou University in September 1983, majoring in political law, where he graduated in July 1987. After college, he worked there.

Zhou joined the Chinese Communist Party in June 1987, and began his political career in July 1987.

He served in various posts in Education Section of Political Department of Henan Provincial Public Security, before serving as deputy director of Shangqiu Municipal Public Security Bureau.

From 2003 to 2012, he spent 9 years serving in various political roles in Henan Provincial Public Security.

In August 2012, he was appointed the vice-mayor of Hebi and party chief of Hebi Municipal Public Security Bureau, he remained in that positions until March 2014, when he was transferred to Kaifeng and appointed the vice-mayor, he concurrently served as director and party chief of Kaifeng Municipal Public Security Bureau.

== Downfall and Detention ==
In October 2014, he was being investigated by the Central Commission for Discipline Inspection for "violations of laws and regulations of the CCP" and was "illegally" detained under "Shuanggui" Method.

In 2015, he and his attorney appealed to the court but got denied. In such political case, it's impossible for one who went through Shuanggui to win justice through appealing to the higher court, since the jurisdiction process was not independent from the CCP in such political case where "Shuanggui" was applied.

After one and half years of detention, on November 18, 2016, he was sentenced to 3 years and fined 200,000 yuan (approx. $27,000 USD) for taking bribes from three subsidiaries in the total amount of 200,000 yuan (approx. $27,000 USD) by the Zhengzhou Intermediate People's Court.

He was released in 2018. He was not part of the Chinese Communist Party after the sentence.
