= Chinese Communist Party Committee Secretary =

Political title

- Simplified Chinese: 党委书记
- Traditional Chinese: 黨委書記
Transcriptions
Standard Mandarin
- Hanyu Pinyin: dǎngwěi shūjì

Short form
- Simplified Chinese: 书记
- Traditional Chinese: 書記
Transcriptions
Standard Mandarin
- Hanyu Pinyin: shūjì

A Party Committee Secretary is the leader of the Chinese Communist Party (CCP) organization in a province, city, village, or other administrative unit. In most cases, it is the de facto highest political office of its area of jurisdiction. The term can also be used for the leadership position of CCP organizations in state-owned enterprises, private companies, foreign-owned companies, universities, research institutes, hospitals, as well as other institutions of the state.

Post-Cultural Revolution, the CCP is responsible for the formulation of policies and the government is responsible for its day-to-day execution. At every level of jurisdiction, a government leader serves alongside the party secretary. For example, in the case of a province, the provincial Party Secretary is the de facto highest office, but the government is headed by a government leader called a "Governor" (simplified Chinese: 省长; traditional Chinese: 省長; pinyin: shěng zhǎng). The Governor is usually the second-highest-ranking official in the party's Provincial Committee, and holds the concurrent title of "Deputy Party Committee Secretary" (simplified Chinese: 省委副书记; traditional Chinese: 省委副書記; pinyin: shěng wěi fù shū jì). A similar comparison can be made for municipal Party Secretaries and Mayors in city-level, or even for the general secretary of CCP and the Premier of State Council in state-level.

There have been rare instances where both Party Secretary and Governor (or Mayor) positions were held by the same person, though this is not the common practice since the end of the Cultural Revolution. The Party Secretary is usually assisted by numerous Deputy Party Secretaries.

Until the 1980s, the leading position of a local party organization was called the First Secretary, its deputy the "Second Secretary". The local party organizations each had its own Secretariat with numerous secretaries.

Under the general secretaryship of Xi Jinping, party secretaries have gained particular prominence in private enterprises, sometimes doubling as company president or chairman of the board.

== Party-government organization hierarchy ==
Beginning at the provincial level, China's party-government dual administrative system arranges a hierarchy by which the party chief is in charge of determining the direction of policy as well as personnel changes, and the corresponding government leader is responsible for implementing party policy and arranging the annual budget, as well as other everyday government matters and ceremonial tasks. The list of party chief levels is as follows:

- At the central level, the party chief is known as CCP Central Committee General Secretary (中央总书记), while the corresponding government positions are known as President and Premier.
- At the provincial level, the party chief is known as CCP Provincial Committee Secretary (省委书记), while the corresponding government position is known as Governor.
- At the prefecture or municipal level, the party chief is known as CCP Municipal Committee Secretary (市委书记), while the corresponding government position is known as Mayor.
- At the county level, the party chief is known as CCP County Committee Secretary (县委书记), while the corresponding government position is known as the County Governor.
- At the township level, the party chief is known as CCP Township/Town Committee Secretary (乡委书记), while the corresponding government position is known as the Magistrate.
- At the village level, the local party chief, known as the Village Party Branch Secretary (村支部书记) heads a committee of around ten people to make executive decisions related to the village. The process is not entirely formal, and therefore the party chief at this level is not considered part of the Chinese civil service.

The CCP secretaries at the provincial level also often serve as the chair of the provincial people's congress. Generally, a top government official (the mayor, governor) will also hold the first deputy party chief position.

=== Deputy Party Committee Secretary ===
A Deputy Party Secretary (党委副书记) assists in the work of the Party Secretary. In provincial and most prefecture-level jurisdictions, there are two deputy party chiefs. The higher-ranked deputy party chief is generally also concurrently the head of the government of the party committee's area of jurisdiction. The other deputy party chief is known as the zhuanzhi fushuji (专职副书记), literally, "Specifically-designated Deputy Party Secretary." Generally, the zhuanzhi deputy party chief is also the head of the party school of any given jurisdiction. For example, in Sichuan province, the Party Secretary heads the party committee, while the Governor of Sichuan serves as the top ranked deputy party chief, and the "specifically-designated" deputy party chief ranks immediately next to the governor in precedence.

=== Party Branch Secretary ===
A "Party Branch" or "Party Group" (党组; dangzu) exists in almost all institutions of state which are not formally part of the Communist Party organization. These include government organs, People's Congresses, ministries, provincial and municipal departments and so on. These organizations are created by mandate of a Party Committee, serve to ensure that the general policy guidelines of the party is followed at each respective institution. They may gather for ad hoc meetings to study party documents or speeches or carry out "party life meetings" at their respective institutions, but they do not serve as an executive body in the domains which they reside.

The Party Branch Secretary or Party Group Secretary (党组书记; dangzu shuji) is a distinct office from that of the Party Committee Secretary. They do not have the elaborate organization and bureaucracy that is commonplace with a Party Committee. Unlike Party Committees, which report to parent Party Committees at a higher level of jurisdiction, Party Branches are responsible to the Party Committee that mandated its creation.

== See also ==
- Chinese Communist Party Deputy Committee Secretary
- Chinese Communist Party Provincial Standing Committee
- General Secretary of the Chinese Communist Party
