= Party group =

Chinese Communist Party structure

- Simplified Chinese: 党组
- Traditional Chinese: 黨組
Transcriptions
Standard Mandarin
- Hanyu Pinyin: dǎngzǔ

A party group (Note: Other English translations exist such as leading party group, party core group, and party fraction.) is a formal group within an organization that works to ensure democratic centralism as led by the Chinese Communist Party (CCP). Party groups ensure the control of formally non-CCP public institutions like government organizations, people's organizations, people's congresses, and state-owned enterprises by the CCP. The concept of party group was first formalized in the 1945 party constitution during the 7th National Congress.

== Operation ==
As an example, the party's Organization Department controlled the Ministry of Human Resources and Social Security through an eleven-member party group as of 2010.

== List of Party Groups ==
- Leading Party Members Group of the Standing Committee of the National People's Congress
- Leading Party Members Group of the Chinese People's Political Consultative Conference
- Leading Party Members Group of the State Council

== Usage outside of the Chinese Communist Party ==
Party groups were organized within the short-lived Workers' Party of North Korea.

== See also ==
- Party Committee led by the Committee Secretary
