= Qian's Seven Points =

Concept proposed by Qian Qichen

Qian's Seven Points (Chinese: 钱七条; pinyin: Qián Qītiáo), officially the Basic Principles and Policies of the Central People's Government in Handling Hong Kong and Taiwan-Related Issues after 1997, is a concept proposed by Qian Qichen, Vice Premier and Minister of Foreign Affairs of China, in 1995 with regards to Hong Kong's relations with Taiwan.

== Content ==
The content is:

1. The various existing non-governmental exchanges and interactions between Hong Kong and Taiwan, including economic and cultural exchanges and personnel exchanges, remain basically unchanged.
2. Taiwan residents and all kinds of Taiwan capital are encouraged and welcomed to engage in investment, trade and other industrial and commercial activities in Hong Kong. The legitimate rights and interests of Taiwan residents and all kinds of Taiwan capital in Hong Kong are protected by law.
3. In accordance with the " One China " principle, air routes and sea transport routes between the Hong Kong Special Administrative Region and Taiwan are managed as "regional special routes". Maritime and shipping traffic between the Hong Kong Special Administrative Region and Taiwan is conducted on the principle of two-way reciprocity.
4. Taiwan residents may enter and leave Hong Kong in accordance with the laws of the Hong Kong Special Administrative Region, or study, work or settle down there. To facilitate Taiwan residents' entry and exit from Hong Kong, the Central People's Government will make arrangements regarding the documents they hold.
5. Civil society groups and religious organizations in the fields of education, science, technology, culture, art, sports, professions, health care, labour, social welfare, social work, etc. in the Hong Kong Special Administrative Region may maintain and develop relations with the relevant civil society groups and organizations in the Taiwan area on the basis of the principles of non-subordination, non-interference and mutual respect.
6. All official contacts, exchanges, negotiations, signing of agreements and establishment of institutions between the Hong Kong Special Administrative Region and the Taiwan region under any name must be reported to the Central People's Government for approval, or, with specific authorization from the Central People's Government, approved by the Chief Executive of the Special Administrative Region.
7. Taiwan's existing institutions and personnel in Hong Kong can continue to stay, and they must strictly abide by the Basic Law of the Hong Kong Special Administrative Region of the People's Republic of China in their actions, must not violate the "One China" principle, and must not engage in activities that undermine Hong Kong's stability and prosperity or are inconsistent with their registered nature. We encourage and welcome them to contribute to national reunification and maintaining Hong Kong's prosperity and stability.
