= Huanan County =

Huanan County 桦南县
- County
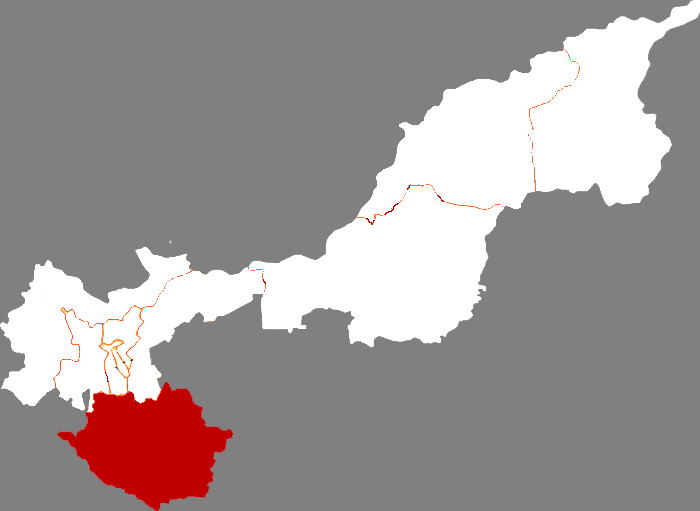

- Location in Heilongjiang
- Coordinates: 46°19′N 130°39′E
- Country: People's Republic of China
- Province: Heilongjiang
- Prefecture-level city: Jiamusi

Area
  - Total: 4,416 km^{2} (1,705 sq mi)

Population (2010)
  - Total: 468,698
  - Density: 106.1/km^{2} (274.9/sq mi)
- Time zone: UTC+8 (China Standard)

Huanan County (simplified Chinese: 桦南县; traditional Chinese: 樺南縣; pinyin: Huànán Xiàn) is a county of eastern Heilongjiang province, People's Republic of China. It is under the jurisdiction of the prefecture-level city of Jiamusi.

== Administrative divisions ==
Huanan County is divided into 7 towns and 5 townships.

7 towns

- Tuoyaozi (驼腰子镇), Shitouhezi (石头河子镇), Huanan (桦南镇), Tulongshan (土龙山镇), Mengjiagang (孟家岗镇), Yanjia (闫家镇), Liumaohe (柳毛河镇)

5 townships

- Jinsha (金沙乡), Lishu (梨树乡), Mingyi (明义乡), Dabalang (大八浪乡), Wudaogang (五道岗乡)

== Climate ==
The climate of Hunan Province is subtropical with seasonal humidity, with four distinct seasons. The region is characterized by an abundance of sunshine, long frost-free periods, and significant precipitation. The average temperature ranges between 16 °C and 18 °C, and the number of days without frost ranges from 253 to 311. Annual precipitation, which varies from 1200 to 1700 mm, creates favorable conditions for agriculture.

Climate data for Huanan, elevation 187 m (614 ft), (1991–2020 normals, extremes 1981–2010)
Month	Jan	Feb	Mar	Apr	May	Jun	Jul	Aug	Sep	Oct	Nov	Dec	Year
Record high °C (°F)	1.4 (34.5)	8.1 (46.6)	19.4 (66.9)	30.7 (87.3)	33.6 (92.5)	36.7 (98.1)	37.4 (99.3)	35.8 (96.4)	31.6 (88.9)	27.5 (81.5)	16.8 (62.2)	5.2 (41.4)	37.4 (99.3)
Mean daily maximum °C (°F)	−12.6 (9.3)	−7.0 (19.4)	1.6 (34.9)	12.2 (54.0)	20.1 (68.2)	25.0 (77.0)	27.2 (81.0)	25.5 (77.9)	20.7 (69.3)	11.6 (52.9)	−1.1 (30.0)	−11.0 (12.2)	9.4 (48.8)
Daily mean °C (°F)	−17.3 (0.9)	−12.6 (9.3)	−3.8 (25.2)	6.3 (43.3)	14.1 (57.4)	19.6 (67.3)	22.3 (72.1)	20.6 (69.1)	14.6 (58.3)	5.9 (42.6)	−5.7 (21.7)	−15.3 (4.5)	4.1 (39.3)
Mean daily minimum °C (°F)	−21.4 (−6.5)	−17.8 (0.0)	−9.1 (15.6)	0.6 (33.1)	8.2 (46.8)	14.4 (57.9)	17.9 (64.2)	16.1 (61.0)	9.0 (48.2)	0.6 (33.1)	−9.9 (14.2)	−19.1 (−2.4)	−0.9 (30.4)
Record low °C (°F)	−35.1 (−31.2)	−30.7 (−23.3)	−25.3 (−13.5)	−10.4 (13.3)	−4.3 (24.3)	4.4 (39.9)	9.4 (48.9)	5.9 (42.6)	−2.6 (27.3)	−13.8 (7.2)	−25.7 (−14.3)	−32.0 (−25.6)	−35.1 (−31.2)
Average precipitation mm (inches)	5.3 (0.21)	3.9 (0.15)	11.1 (0.44)	23.6 (0.93)	55.9 (2.20)	90.6 (3.57)	125.7 (4.95)	110.6 (4.35)	60.5 (2.38)	32.7 (1.29)	13.8 (0.54)	8.4 (0.33)	542.1 (21.34)
Average precipitation days (≥ 0.1 mm)	5.0	4.5	6.6	8.8	12.5	13.9	13.5	13.1	10.4	8.2	6.6	7.2	110.3
Average snowy days	9.2	7.0	9.2	4.3	0.2	0	0	0	0.1	2.6	8.7	10.6	51.9
Average relative humidity (%)	72	66	60	56	60	71	79	82	74	65	67	73	69
Mean monthly sunshine hours	163.2	189.7	225.3	215.4	225.1	223.9	216.8	211.7	214.0	184.5	151.7	142.2	2,363.5
Percentage possible sunshine	58	65	61	53	48	48	46	49	58	55	54	53	54
Source: China Meteorological Administration

== Tea industry ==
The Huangan region is famous for its red soils, which are formed in the warm, temperate and humid climate of China's tropical and subtropical zones. These soils, rich in iron and aluminum, have high acidity, heavy clay, and low organic matter content. Thanks to these conditions, high-quality teas, including black and oolong, are grown in Huangan.

In the Huangan region, the main range of teas includes black and oolong, and occasionally jasmine and white tea. The latter two types are mostly produced for the tourist market and export.

The most famous varieties of tea from Huangan are:

- Liu Bao (Guangxi, black)
- Tieguanyin (Fujian, oolong)
- Da Hong Pao (Wuyi Mountains, Fujian, oolong)

Among these three varieties, the most popular is Da Hong Pao, which is mainly produced in the Wishan mountainous region of Fujian Province. Da Hong Pao tea is characterized by a unique orchid aroma and a long sweet aftertaste. It has gained popularity not only for its taste, but also because of a record case in 2002, when 20 grams of this tea were sold at auction for 22,000 USD, which is 30 times more expensive than its weight in gold. Although this batch of tea was harvested from Da Hong Pao mother trees, there are also more affordable versions made from young plants that come from these mother trees.
