= Qin Yuhai =

Chinese politician and photographer

- 秦玉海

Vice Chairman of the Henan Provincial People's Congress
- In office January 2013 – September 2014
- Chairman: Lu Zhangong; Guo Gengmao

Vice-Governor of Henan
- In office January 2004 – January 2013
- Governor: Li Chengyu; Guo Gengmao

Head of the Department of Public Security of Henan
- In office January 2004 – January 2013
- Preceded by: Zhang Chengfeng
- Succeeded by: Wang Xiaohong

Communist Party Secretary of Jiaozuo
- In office January 2001 – January 2004
- Preceded by: Liu Qiwen
- Succeeded by: Tie Daisheng

Mayor of Jiaozuo
- In office December 1998 – January 2001
- Preceded by: Liu Qiwen
- Succeeded by: Mao Chaofeng

Mayor of Hegang
- In office February 1997 – December 1998
- Preceded by: Feng Yuehua
- Succeeded by: Zhang Xingfu

Personal details
- Born: March 1953 (age 73) Tailai County, Heilongjiang, China
- Party: Chinese Communist Party (1976–2015; expelled)

Qin Yuhai (Chinese: 秦玉海; pinyin: Qín Yùhaǐ; born March 1953) is a Chinese politician and photographer. Born in Heilongjiang, Qin rose to high office in the province of Henan, where he successfully served as the Mayor and Communist Party Secretary of the city of Jiaozuo, the Vice-Governor of Henan, the provincial director of Public Security, First Political Commissar of the Henan Division of the People's Armed Police, and the vice-chairman of the Henan Provincial People's Congress. Qin was investigated for corruption-related offenses and expelled from the Chinese Communist Party (CCP) in early 2015. He faces criminal charges related to taking bribes related to his photography hobby during his time in office.

== Biography ==
Qin was born and raised in Tailai County, Heilongjiang in March 1953. He began work in February 1971 and joined the CCP in March 1976.

From February 1997 to December 1998, he served as the deputy party chief and mayor of Hegang, in Heilongjiang. Then he was transferred to Jiaozuo and appointed the deputy party chief and mayor, he was re-elected in January 1999. In February 2001, he was promoted to become the party chief, a position he held until January 2004.

He became the vice-governor of He'nan in January 2004, and concurrently the head of the Department of Public Security, effectively the top police chief of the province. He served in the post until January 2013.

In January 2013, he was appointed as vice chairman of He'nan Provincial People's Congress. He also held the post of party branch secretary of the provincial People's Congress.

== Downfall ==
On September 21, 2014, state media reported that Qin would undergo investigation by the Central Commission for Discipline Inspection for "serious disciplinary violations".

On February 13, 2015, at the conclusion of the internal party investigation, Qin was expelled from the Communist Party and detained by prosecution authorities. The party investigation concluded that Qin had taken massive bribes, cash gifts, and wasted public resources. It also said he sought illicit benefits for his associates and gave favorable treatment to certain businesses, and "committed adultery". Qin was sentenced for 13 years and 6 months in prison on November 28, 2016.

== Photography ==
Qin Yuhai was the honorary chairman of the Photographers' Association of Henan Province, his albums included Mountains and Rivers of Jiaozuo, Mount Yuntai Landscapes, Mount Phoenix in October, Glimpses of Wuda Lianchi Volcanic Field, The Dreamland, Wu Xiang – Water, and the Real and China – Mount Phoenix.

At the time of the investigation into Qin in September 2014, Qin's photographic work Mount Yuntai Landscapes can be seen at various station platforms in the Beijing Subway, including Jianguomen, Dawanglu, and Sihui East stations. In response to Qin's corruption investigation, Beijing Subway agreed to remove his works from the platforms.

The South China Morning Post reported that Qin used his power to give a company massive government contracts to promote a local mountain and tourist destination on billboards in the Beijing, Nanjing, and Shanghai subways, worth tens of millions of dollars. It was said that Qin had received bribes from the company in the form of cameras and assistance in promoting his work in China and abroad. In addition, Qin was said to have been so engrossed in his photography hobby that he spent almost all of his free time taking pictures of the Yuntai Mountain while holding the office of the Mayor of Jiaozuo, and neglected some of his official duties.

== Awards ==
Year	Award	Result	Notes
2004	Sixth China Photography Awards – Gold prize	Won	
2006	Prize for Outstanding Contribution at the China Photographers' Association Jubilee	Won	
2007	Seventh China Photography Awards – Gold prize	Won	

== See also ==
- List of members of the 11th National People's Congress

Civic offices
Preceded by Song Enhua (宋恩华)	Secretary of Heilongjiang Provincial Party Committee of the Communist Youth League; 1994–1997	Succeeded by Gao Zhijie (高志杰)
Government offices
Preceded by Feng Yuehua (冯悦华)	Mayor of Hegang; 1997–1998	Succeeded by Zhang Xingfu (张兴福)
Preceded by Liu Qiwen (刘其文)	Mayor of Jiaozuo; 1998–2001	Succeeded by Mao Chaofeng
Preceded by Zhang Chengfeng (张程锋)	Head of Public Security of Henan Province; 2004–2013	Succeeded by Wang Xiaohong
Party political offices
Preceded by Liu Qiwen (刘其文)	Communist Party Secretary of Jiaozuo; 2001–2004	Succeeded by Tie Daisheng (铁代生)
