= General Office of the State Council =

Chinese government body, founded 1949

General Office of the State Council of the People's Republic of China
- 中华人民共和国国务院办公厅

Agency overview
- Formed: 27 September 1949
- Jurisdiction: State Council of China
- Headquarters: 2 Fuyou Street, Zhongnanhai, Xicheng District, Beijing
- Agency executives: Wu Zhenglong, Secretary-General of the State Council; Wang Zhijun, Executive Deputy Secretary-General of the State Council (minister-level)
- Website: www.gov.cn/xxgk/pub/govpublic/

General Office of the State Council of the People's Republic of China
- Simplified Chinese: 中华人民共和国国务院办公厅
- Traditional Chinese: 中華人民共和國國務院辦公廳
Transcriptions
Standard Mandarin
- Hanyu Pinyin: Zhōnghuá Rénmín Gònghéguó Guówùyuàn Bàngōngtīng

Alternative Chinese name
- Simplified Chinese: 国务院办公厅
- Traditional Chinese: 國務院辦公廳
Transcriptions
Standard Mandarin
- Hanyu Pinyin: Guówùyuàn Bàngōngtīng

Second alternative Chinese name
- Simplified Chinese: 国办
- Traditional Chinese: 國辦
Transcriptions
Standard Mandarin
- Hanyu Pinyin: Zhōngbàn

The General Office of the State Council of the People's Republic of China is an administrative agency of the State Council which assists the leaders with the day to day administrative operations of the Chinese government.

== Functions ==
The main powers of the State Council General Office:

1. Preparation of the State Council meeting to help the leadership and organization of the State Council meeting make decisions on state matters
2. To help the leadership and council in the preparation or implement audit and releasing documents
3. To consult and report to the leaders of the State Council for approval in regards to audits carried out at the State Council level departments, municipalities, provinces, autonomous region, autonomous region.
4. Advise the state council on sensitive issues between the departments under the State Council.
5. Manage the relationship between the central government and local government authorities on the implementation on state council directives.
6. Help the State Council coordinate in national emergencies and major crises.
7. Public relations from the people directly.

The General Office assists in the preparation of State Council meetings, assists State Council leadership in reviewing or drafting State Council documents, studies government issues, and makes recommendations to the State Council.

The General Office also helps regulate the overseas stock market listings of Chinese companies.

The General Office runs gov.cn, the official website of the State Council.

== Organization ==
The General Office has the following institutions:

=== Internal organization ===
- Secretary Bureau 1 (General Duty Office of the State Council)
- Secretary Bureau 2
- Secretary Bureau 3
- Secretary Bureau 4
- Secretary Bureau 5
- Secretary Bureau 6
- Government Office
- Inspection Room
- Personnel Department
- Administrative Division
- Party Committee
- Retired Cadres Bureau

=== Directly affiliated institutions ===
- China Government Network Operation Center

== See also ==
- General Offices
  - General Office of the Chinese Communist Party
  - General Office of the Central Military Commission
- Secretary-General of the State Council
- Deputy Secretary-General of the State Council
- Office of the Premier of China
