= Hua Jianmin =

Chinese politician

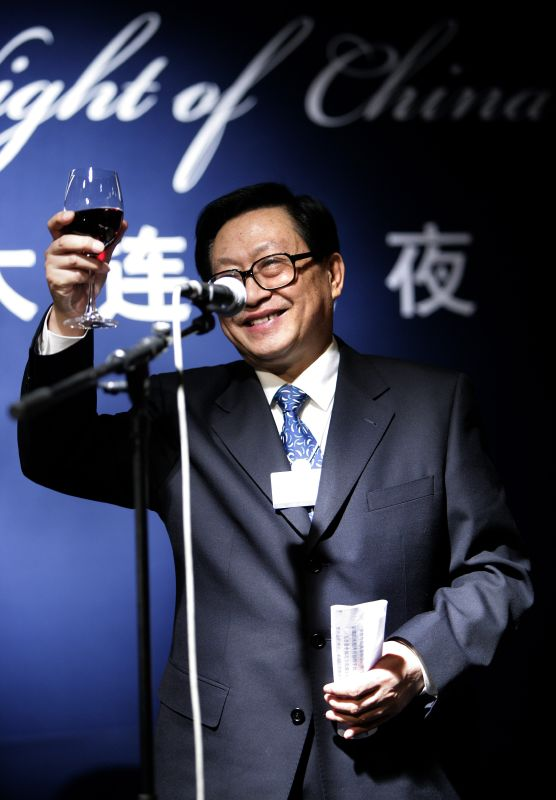
- Hua Jianmin at the World Economic Forum in Davos, Switzerland, 25 January 2007.
- Born: January 1940 (age 86); Shanghai, China
- Education: Tsinghua University
- Occupation: Politician

Chinese name
- Traditional Chinese: 華建敏
- Simplified Chinese: 华建敏
Transcriptions
Standard Mandarin
- Hanyu Pinyin: Huá Jiànmǐn

Hua Jianmin (born January 1940) is a Chinese politician. He served as state councillor and secretary general of the State Council, president of the China National School of Administration, and vice chairman of the standing committee of the 11th National People's Congress.

== Biography ==
Born in Shanghai, Hua Jianmin graduated from department of dynamics of Tsinghua University. He joined the Chinese Communist Party (CCP) in 1961. In 1994, he was elected to the standing committee of the CCP Shanghai committee, and was appointed vice mayor of Shanghai. He was a member of the 16th and 17th Central Committees of the Chinese Communist Party.
