= Wang Xiaohong =

Chinese politician (born 1957)

- 王小洪
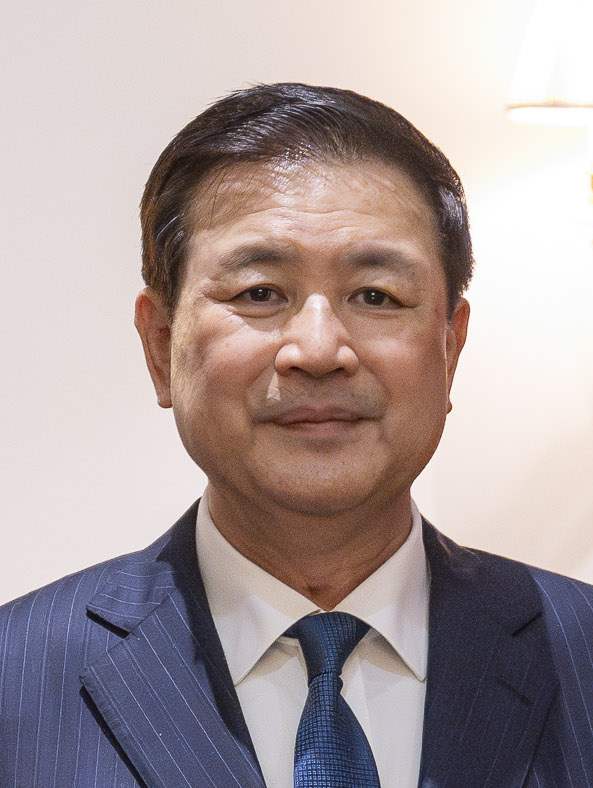
- Wang in 2024

Deputy Secretary of the Central Political and Legal Affairs Commission
- Incumbent
- Assumed office 24 June 2022
- Secretary: Guo Shengkun; Chen Wenqing
- Preceded by: Zhao Kezhi

State Councilor of China
- Incumbent
- Assumed office 12 March 2023 Serving with Wu Zhenglong and Shen Yiqin
- Premier: Li Qiang

Minister of Public Security
- Incumbent
- Assumed office 24 June 2022
- Premier: Li Keqiang; Li Qiang
- Preceded by: Zhao Kezhi

Party Secretary of the Ministry of Public Security
- Incumbent
- Assumed office 19 November 2021
- General secretary: Xi Jinping
- Minister: Guo Shengkun; Zhao Kezhi
- Preceded by: Zhao Kezhi

Chief of Beijing Municipal Public Security Bureau
- In office March 2015 – April 2020
- Mayor: Wang Anshun; Chen Jining
- Preceded by: Fu Zhenghua
- Succeeded by: Qi Yanjun

Personal details
- Born: 11 July 1957 (age 69) Fuzhou, Fujian
- Party: Chinese Communist Party
- Education: Central Party School

Wang Xiaohong (Chinese: 王小洪; pinyin: Wáng Xiǎohóng; born 11 July 1957) is a Chinese politician who has been serving as the minister of public security of China and deputy secretary of the Central Political and Legal Affairs Commission of the Chinese Communist Party (CCP) since June 2022. Wang has also been serving as a member of the CCP Secretariat under CCP General Secretary Xi Jinping since October 2022 and he is believed to be a political ally of Xi.

== Early life and education ==
Wang Xiaohong was born in Fuzhou, Fujian. He joined the workforce in July 1974 and joined the Chinese Communist Party (CCP) in December 1982. He graduated from the People's Public Security University of China and the Central Party School.

== Career ==
=== Fujian ===
In December 1979, he assumed the role of cadre and secretary of the Minhou County Public Security Bureau. In May 1984, he became the deputy director of the Minhou County Public Security Bureau. In January 1989, he assumed the roles of head of the Minhou County Public Security Bureau and director of the Suburban Subdistrict Branch of the Fuzhou Municipal Public Security Bureau.

In August 1993, he was appointed deputy chief and deputy party secretary of Fuzhou Municipal Public Security Bureau. Since February 1998, he was promoted to chief of Fuzhou Municipal Public Security Bureau and then chief of Zhangzhou Municipal Public Security Bureau. While serving as the director of the Zhangzhou Municipal Public Security Bureau, Wang Xiaohong employed external police forces to dismantle a triad organization headed by Lü Qitai in Xiangcheng District.

In May 2002, he became deputy director of Fujian Provincial Public Security Department. In September 2011, he was appointed as the deputy mayor of Xiamen and chief of Xiamen Municipal Public Security Bureau. During that period, he oversaw the investigation of the 2013 Xiamen bus fire case.

=== Henan ===
In August 2013, he became assistant governor of Henan and director of Henan Provincial Public Security Department. In November 2013, he was appointed as the political commissar of the Armed Police Force of Henan Province and the first secretary of the Party Committee. In December 2014, he became deputy governor of Henan.

Three months subsequent to his arrival in Henan, Wang Xiaohong commenced an investigation into Royal No. 1 Club, recognized as the "premier nightclub in the Central Plains," which employed a minimum of 4,500 prostitutes at its zenith. On the evening of November 1, 2013, Wang employed the "off-site police, raid and search" strategy, mobilizing over 1,000 police officers from Xinxiang and notifying the majority of authorities at the Henan Public Security Bureau until after the operation commenced. The police effectively encircled the Royal No. 1 Club in Zhengzhou, the provincial capital, and conducted an investigation involving Zhou Tingxin, the former deputy director of the Zhengzhou Public Security Bureau. On September 21, 2016, Qin Yuhai, the former director of the Henan Provincial Public Security Bureau, was investigated by the CCP Central Commission for Discipline Inspection for his association with Royal No. 1 Club. On February 26, 2016, officials notified that over 260 criminal suspects are implicated in the Royal No. 1 case, comprising 152 public security police officers and three prosecutors. This episode fundamentally transformed the Henan police and enhanced their public character. On January 15, 2015, the State Council awarded him the rank of Deputy Chief Superintendent of Police.

=== Beijing ===
In March 2015, he was appointed deputy mayor of Beijing and chief of Beijing Municipal Public Security Bureau. In May 2016, he was appointed as deputy minister of Ministry of Public Security and concurrently deputy mayor of Beijing and Bureau Chief of Beijing Municipal Public Security Bureau. In May 2017, he was confirmed as a minister-level official. On October 24, 2017, at 19th National Congress of the Chinese Communist Party, he was elected as a member of the 19th CCP Central Committee. On January 30, 2018, he resigned from his post as deputy mayor of Beijing.

=== Ministry of Public Security ===
In March 2018, Wang Xiaohong became deputy party secretary and deputy minister of the Ministry of Public Security, person in charge work day-to-day (minister-level official). On April 24, 2020, Wang Xiaohong was no longer chief of Beijing Municipal Public Security Bureau. On 19 November 2021, he rose to become party secretary of the Ministry of Public Security, succeeding Zhao Kezhi. On 24 June 2022, he was appointed as the minister of public security and deputy secretary of the CCP Central Political and Legal Affairs Commission. He remained a full member of the 20th CCP Central Committee after the 20th CCP National Congress, where he was also appointed as a member of the CCP Secretariat. He was also appointed as a state councilor on 12 March 2023 in the Li Qiang Government. In 2024, Wang issued a call for the police to upgrade their equipment and move towards predictive policing by integrating more advanced artificial intelligence systems into surveillance technology. In September 2026, he attended the China-Central Asia Public Security and Interior Ministers’ mechanism in Beijing, meeting with his counterparts from Kazakhstan, Kyrgyzstan, Tajikistan, Turkmenistan and Uzbekistan, where he called on the nations to fight the Three Evils.

Government offices
Preceded by Lu Shigang (卢士钢)	Chief of Xiamen Municipal Public Security Bureau; 2011–2013	Succeeded by Lin Rui
Preceded by Qin Yuhai	Chief of Henan Provincial Public Security Department; 2013–2015	Succeeded by Xu Ganlu
Preceded by Fu Zhenghua	Chief of Beijing Municipal Public Security Bureau; 2015–2020	Succeeded by Qi Yanjun
Preceded by Fu Zhenghua	Executive Vice Minister of Public Security; 2018–2022	Succeeded by TBD
Preceded by Zhao Kezhi	Minister of Public Security; 2022–present	Incumbent
Party political offices
Preceded by Zhao Kezhi	Deputy Secretary of the Central Political and Legal Affairs Commission; 2022–present	Incumbent
Preceded by Zhao Kezhi	Communist Party Secretary of the Ministry of Public Security; 2021–present	Incumbent
