= State councillor =

Senior position in the State Council of China

State Councillor of the People's Republic of China
- 中华人民共和国国务委员
- National Emblem of China

- Flag of China
- Incumbent; Wang Xiaohong; Wu Zhenglong; Shen Yiqin since 12 March 2023
- State Council of the People's Republic of China
- Status: Deputy national-level official
- Member of: Plenary Meeting of the State Council; Executive Meeting of the State Council
- Reports to: Premier of the State Council
- Residence: Zhongnanhai
- Seat: Beijing
- Nominator: Premier of the State Council
- Appointer: President; pursuant to a National People's Congress decision
- Term length: Five years, renewable once consecutively
- Constituting instrument: Constitution of China
- Formation: 4 May 1982; 44 years ago
- Website: State Council

A State Councillor of the People's Republic of China (Chinese: 中华人民共和国国务委员; pinyin: guówù wěiyuán) serves as a senior vice leader within the State Council and shares responsibilities with the Vice Premiers in assisting the Premier in the administration and coordination of governmental affairs.

== History ==
The position was created during the May 1982 restructuring of the State Council, when eleven state councillors were appointed, ten of whom were vice premiers until then.

== Role ==
The state councillors are nominated by the premier, who are then approved by the National People's Congress and appointed by the president. Candidates for top positions including the state councillors are first approved by the CCP's Politburo Standing Committee, and then by its Politburo, then approved in a special plenary session the Central Committee just before the NPC session for vote by the Congress, with the premier nominating the candidates during the NPC session.

State councillors are members of the executive meetings of the State Council, along with the premier, vice premiers, and the secretary-general. The state councilors selected once every five years and are limited to two terms. The state councillors are tasked with assisting the premier, as well as be entrusted by the premier to take charge of work in certain fields or take certain special tasks. State councillors can also represent the State Council on foreign visits.

State councillors often accompany China's higher dignitaries on trips abroad, as was the case with State Councillor Tang Jiaxuan from 2003 to 2008, and Dai Bingguo from 2008 to 2013. Dai also became China's representative at the 2009 G8 summit in Italy when President Hu Jintao decided to cut short his attendance to return to China in order to deal with the July 2009 Ürümqi riots.

== List of state councillors ==
5th State Council (1982–1983)

The position was created during the May 1982 restructuring of the State Council. Eleven state councillors were appointed, ten of whom were vice premiers until then, the only exception being Zhang Jingfu.

1. Yu Qiuli
2. Geng Biao
3. Fang Yi
4. Gu Mu
5. Kang Shi'en
6. Chen Muhua
7. Bo Yibo
8. Ji Pengfei
9. Huang Hua
10. Zhang Jingfu
11. Zhang Aiping

6th State Council (1983–1988)

1. Fang Yi
2. Gu Mu
3. Kang Shi'en
4. Chen Muhua
5. Ji Pengfei
6. Zhang Jingfu
7. Zhang Aiping
8. Wu Xueqian
9. Wang Bingqian
10. Song Ping
11. Song Jian

7th State Council (1988–1993)

1. Li Tieying
2. Qin Jiwei
3. Wang Bingqian
4. Song Jian
5. Wang Fang
6. Zou Jiahua
7. Li Guixian
8. Chen Xitong
9. Chen Junsheng
10. Qian Qichen

8th State Council (1993–1998)

1. Li Tieying
2. Chi Haotian
3. Song Jian
4. Li Guixian
5. Chen Junsheng
6. Ismail Amat
7. Peng Peiyun
8. Luo Gan - Secretary-General of the State Council

9th State Council (1998–2003)

Chi Haotian	Luo Gan	Ismail Amat	Wu Yi	Wang Zhongyu
Minister of National Defence	Minister of Public Security	Ethnic affairs, etc.	Trade, etc.	Secretary-General of the State Council

10th State Council (2003–2008)

Zhou Yongkang	Cao Gangchuan	Tang Jiaxuan	Hua Jianmin	Chen Zhili
Minister of Public Security	Minister of National Defence	Foreign affairs	Secretary-General of the State Council	Education, sci-tech, culture, health, sport

11th State Council (2008–2013)

Liu Yandong	Ma Kai	Liang Guanglie	Meng Jianzhu	Dai Bingguo
Education, sci-tech, culture, sport	Secretary-General of the State Council	Minister of National Defence	Minister of Public Security	Foreign affairs

12th State Council (2013–2018)

Yang Jing	Chang Wanquan	Yang Jiechi	Guo Shengkun	Wang Yong
Secretary-General of the State Council until 24 February 2018	Minister of National Defence	Foreign affairs	Minister of Public Security	Disaster response, etc.

13th State Council (2018–2023)

Wei Fenghe	Wang Yong	Wang Yi	Xiao Jie	Zhao Kezhi
Minister of National Defence	Disaster response, etc.	Minister of Foreign Affairs	Secretary-General of the State Council	Minister of Public Security

14th State Council (2023–present)

From the 1st Session of the 14th National People's Congress to the 6th Session of the Standing Committee of the 14th National People's Congress

Li Shangfu	Wang Xiaohong	Wu Zhenglong	Shen Yiqin	Qin Gang
Minister of National Defence until 25 October 2023	Minister of Public Security	Secretary-General of the State Council	Civil affairs, human resources, etc.	Minister of Foreign Affairs until 25 July 2023

Since the 6th Session of the Standing Committee of the 14th National People's Congress

Wang Xiaohong	Wu Zhenglong	Shen Yiqin
Minister of Public Security	Secretary-General of the State Council	Civil affairs, human resources, etc.
