= Plenary meeting of the State Council =

Periodic gathering of the Chinese government

- Simplified Chinese: 国务院全体会议
- Traditional Chinese: 國務院全體會議
Transcriptions
Standard Mandarin
- Hanyu Pinyin: Guówùyuàn Quántǐ Huìyì

A plenary meeting is a periodic gathering of all members of the State Council of the People's Republic of China every six months.

== Functions ==
The plenary meeting is chaired by the Premier, joined by Vice Premiers, State Councillors, Ministers in charge of Ministries and Commissions, the Governor of the People's Bank, the Auditor-General, and the Secretary-General. It usually runs bi-annually and when necessary, non-members can be invited to participate. According to the Organic Law of the State Council, the main tasks of the meeting are "discussing and deciding on major matters in the State Council’s work, such as government work reports and plans for national economic and social development, and making arrangements for the State Council’s important work". It is generally held every six months.
