= Premier of China =

Head of government of China

Premier of the State Council of the People's Republic of China
- 中华人民共和国国务院总理
- National Emblem of China

- Flag of China

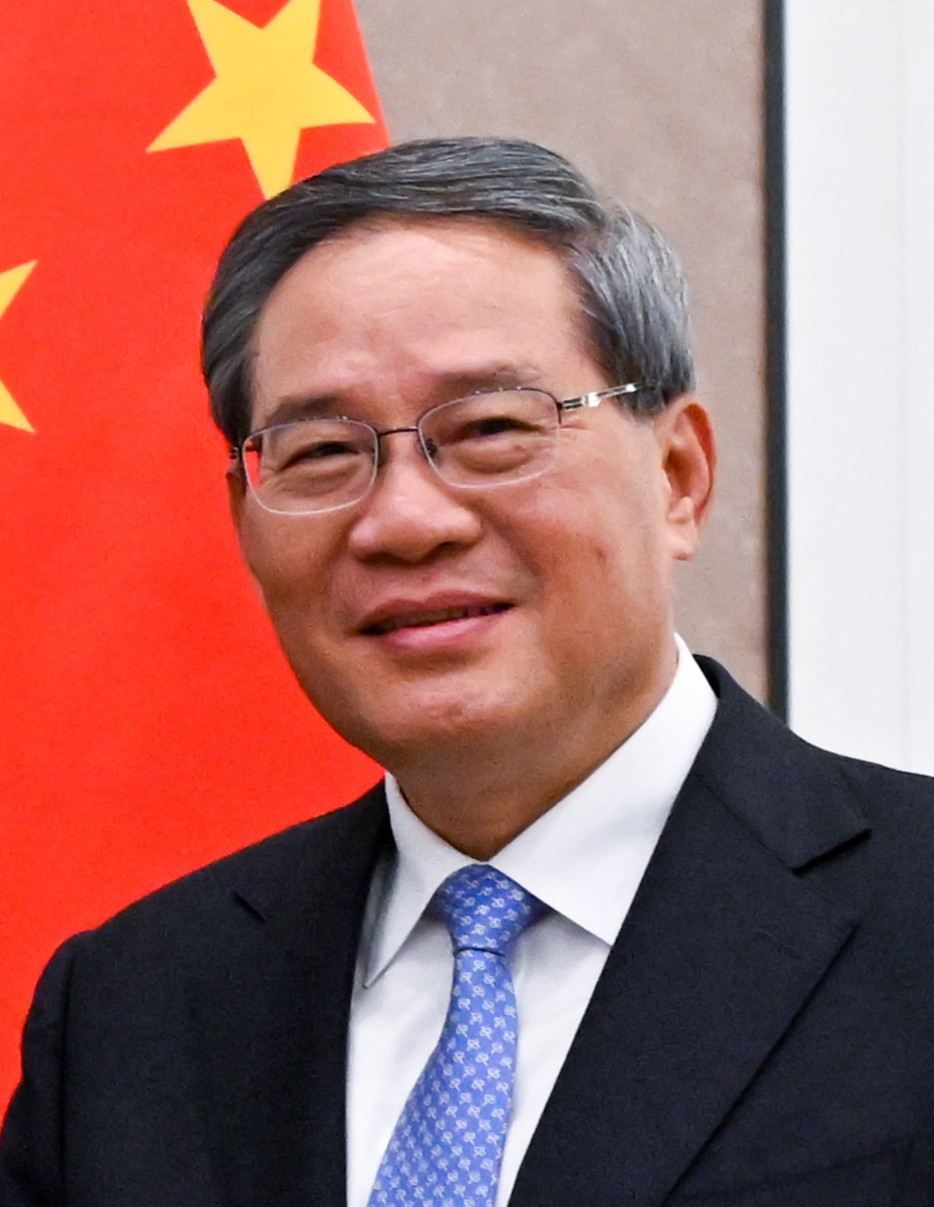
- Incumbent; Li Qiang since 11 March 2023
- State Council of the People's Republic of China
- Style: Comrade (同志) (formal); His Excellency (阁下) (diplomatic)
- Type: Head of government
- Status: National-level official
- Member of: Plenary Meeting of the State Council; Executive Meeting of the State Council
- Reports to: National People's Congress and its Standing Committee
- Residence: Premier's Office, Zhongnanhai, Beijing
- Seat: Beijing
- Nominator: President (chosen within the Chinese Communist Party)
- Appointer: National People's Congress
- Term length: Five years, renewable once consecutively
- Constituting instrument: Constitution of China
- Precursor: Premier of the Government Administration Council of the Central People's Government
- Inaugural holder: Yikuang (Qing dynasty); Zhou Enlai (current form)
- Formation: 8 May 1911; 115 years ago (Premier of the Imperial Cabinet); 12 March 1912; 114 years ago (Republican era); 1 October 1949; 76 years ago (Premier of the Government Administration Council of the Central People's Government); 27 September 1954; 71 years ago (Premier of the State Council)
- Unofficial names: Prime Minister
- Deputy: Vice Premier; State councillor
- Salary: CN¥150,000 per annum est. (2015)

Premier of the State Council of the People's Republic of China
- Simplified Chinese: 中华人民共和国国务院总理
- Traditional Chinese: 中華人民共和國國務院總理
Transcriptions
Standard Mandarin
- Hanyu Pinyin: Zhōnghuá Rénmín Gònghéguó Guówùyuàn Zǒnglǐ

Alternative Chinese name
- Simplified Chinese: 国务院总理
- Traditional Chinese: 國務院總理
Transcriptions
Standard Mandarin
- Hanyu Pinyin: Guówùyuàn Zǒnglǐ

The premier of the State Council of the People's Republic of China is the head of government of the People's Republic of China (PRC) and leader of the State Council, the executive organ of the National People's Congress (NPC) and highest administrative organ of state power.

The post of prime minister was established in 1911 near the end of the Qing dynasty. Following the establishment of the Republic of China, the premier of the Cabinet was established, which was renamed to the Premier of State Council in 1916 and the president of the Executive Yuan in 1928. The ROC post has continued to exist in Taiwan following the government's retreat to the island. After the establishment of the People's Republic of China in 1949, the premier of the Government Administration Council of the Central People's Government was established. With the adoption of a constitution in 1954, the post was renamed into the premier of the State Council. The premier is the third-highest-ranking official in China's political system after the general secretary of the Chinese Communist Party (party leader) and the president (state representative), and holds the highest rank in the civil service of the central government. Since 1993, the positions of general secretary and president have been held by the same person, making the premier effectively the second-highest-ranking official in practice.

The premier presides over the plenary and executive meetings of the State Council, and assumes overall leadership over the State Council's work. The premier delivers a government work report at the annual session of the NPC. The premier also signs administrative regulations passed by the State Council and signs the orders approving the appointment and removal of vice-ministerial level officials of the State Council, as well as chief executives of Hong Kong and of Macau. The premier additionally has the authority to impose martial law. The premier is assisted by vice premiers and state councillors in their duties. The premier heads the Leading Party Members Group of the State Council. In China's political system, the premier is generally considered to be the one responsible for managing the economy. The premier is appointed by the NPC after being nominated by the president, and responsible to NPC and its Standing Committee. The premier serves for a five-year term, renewable once consecutively. Every premier has been a member of the CCP Politburo Standing Committee since the PRC's founding in 1949, except during brief transition periods. The incumbent premier is Li Qiang, who took office on 11 March 2023, succeeding Li Keqiang.

== History ==
=== Background ===
In the early 1900s, the Qing dynasty began implementing constitutional reform in China in order to prevent a revolution. The reforms included the Principles of the Constitution passed in 1908, which ordered that elections for provincial assemblies must be held within a year. On 8 May 1911, the government replaced the Grand Council, which had the role of a privy council, with a thirteen-member cabinet, led by Prince Qing, who was appointed Prime Minister of the Imperial Cabinet. However, the cabinet included nine Manchus, seven of whom were members of the imperial clan. This "Princes' Cabinet" was unpopular among the people and was viewed as a reactionary measure, being described at one point as "the old Grand Council under the name of a cabinet, autocracy under the name of constitutionalism."

When the Wuchang Uprising broke out in November 1911, the imperial court summoned the general Yuan Shikai to command the Beiyang Army and put down the revolution. He was named Prime Minister on 2 November 1911, shortly after Prince Qing stepped down. He remained in that office until March 1912, when he negotiated with Empress Dowager Longyu the abdication of the Xuantong Emperor. However, the post was briefly revived in July 1917 during Zhang Xun's attempt to restore the Qing monarchy, but he only held it for several days before Beijing was retaken by Republican forces.

Following the collapse of the Qing dynasty, the premier of the Republic of China was created as Premier of the Cabinet (內閣總理) in 1912. It was changed to the Secretary of State (國務卿) in 1914 and Premier of State Council (國務總理) in 1916 in the Beiyang government. In 1928, the Kuomintang (KMT) government established the Executive Yuan and Tan Yankai served as the first president of the Executive Yuan. It was formalized in 1947 after the Constitution of the Republic of China was passed. The post was abolished in mainland China, but continued on Taiwan since 1949.

=== People's Republic of China ===
The Organic Law of the Central People's Government, passed by the first plenary session of the Chinese People's Political Consultative Conference on 29 September 1949, established the premier of the Government Administration Council of the Central People's Government. Zhou Enlai was appointed as premier immediately after the proclamation of the People's Republic of China on 1 October 1949. With the adoption of a constitution in 1954, the post was renamed into the premier of the State Council of the People's Republic of China.

Since the 1990s, there has been a division of responsibilities between the premier and the Chinese Communist Party (CCP) general secretary wherein the premier is responsible for the economy and the technical details of implementing government policy while the general secretary gathers the political support necessary for government policy. However, this was seen by observers to be overturned under the leadership of CCP general secretary Xi Jinping, who has centralized power around himself, and has taken responsibility over areas that were traditionally the domain of Premier Li Keqiang, including the economy.

The premier was historically chosen within the CCP through deliberations by incumbent Politburo members and retired CCP Politburo members as part of the process of determining membership in the incoming new Politburo Standing Committee. Under this informal process, the eventual future premier is initially chosen as a vice premier before assuming the position of premier during a subsequent round of leadership transitions. This changed under Xi, with his ally and current premier Li Qiang never having served as vice premier. Under Li Qiang's tenure, the premier's political status was seen as having risen again.

== Selection ==
The premier is appointed by the National People's Congress (NPC) upon being nominated by the president. The NPC also has the power to remove the premier and other state officers from office. Elections and removals are decided by majority vote. In practice, the premier is chosen within the CCP leadership, including the Politburo Standing Committee. Candidates for top positions including the premier are first approved first by the CCP's Politburo Standing Committee, and then by its Politburo, then approved in a plenary session the Central Committee just before the NPC session for vote by the Congress, with the president nominating the candidate during the NPC session. Immediately after the premier's election, the president signs the presidential order formalizing the premier's appointment. Since 2018, the premier is required to recite the constitutional oath of office before assuming office. The length of the premier's term of office is the same as the NPC, which is 5 years, and the premier is restricted to two consecutive terms.

== Powers and duties ==
The premier is the highest administrative position in the government of China. The premier heads the State Council and is responsible for organizing and administering the Chinese civil bureaucracy. For example, the premier is tasked with planning and implementing national economic and social development and the state budget. The premier has always been a member of the Politburo Standing Committee of the Chinese Communist Party. The premier leads the Leading Party Members Group of the State Council, which is responsible for overseeing the implementation of CCP Central Committee policies in the State Council.

The premier's duties include overseeing the various ministries, departments, commissions and statutory agencies of the State Council. The premier can also propose the establishment, merger or dissolution of ministries, which would then be decided upon by the National People's Congress or its Standing Committee. The premier nominates the candidates for vice premiers, state councillors, ministerial offices and the secretary-general of the State Council for appointment by the NPC. The vice premiers assist the premier in their duties. The first-ranked vice premier acts in the premier's capacity in their absence. The premier also signs the order approving the appointments or removals of State Council officials at the deputy-ministerial level, as well as the Chief Executive of Hong Kong and the Chief Executive of Macau. The premier chairs the plenary and executive meetings of the State Council. The executive meetings include the premier, vice premiers, state councillors and the secretary-general of the State Council, and are held two or three times a month, and can be held in any time if necessary. The premier can call Work Meetings in order to issue instructions; these meetings were abolished in 2003 but were reintroduced in 2023. The premier also chairs the bimonthly special study sessions, which highlight an area for the State Council to study. The State Council has the authority to issue proposals to the NPC and its Standing Committee, which must be approved by the premier. It can also draft or abolish administrative regulations, which are then signed into order and promulgated by the premier. The premier delivers a government work report at the annual session of the NPC.

The premier does not have command authority over the armed forces, but is generally the head of the National Defense Mobilization Commission which is a department of the armed forces. The State Council has the authority to impose martial law in subdivisions below the provincial-level administrative divisions, which the premier then proclaims in an order; premier Li Peng once used the authority to impose martial law in parts of Beijing and to order the military crackdown of the Tiananmen Square protests in 1989.

== See also ==
- List of leaders of the People's Republic of China
- Politics of China
