= Secretary-General of the State Council =

Political office in the People's Republic of China

Secretary-General of the State Council of the People's Republic of China
- 中华人民共和国国务院秘书长
- Emblem of the People's Republic of China
- Incumbent; Wu Zhenglong since 12 March 2023
- General Office of the State Council
- Status: Provincial and ministerial-level official
- Member of: Plenary Meeting of the State Council; Executive Meeting of the State Council
- Seat: Beijing
- Appointer: President with the confirmation of the National People's Congress or its Standing Committee
- Term length: Five years, renewable
- Inaugural holder: Li Weihan
- Formation: 19 October 1949; 76 years ago

Secretary-General of the State Council
- Simplified Chinese: 中华人民共和国国务院秘书长
- Traditional Chinese: 中華人民共和國國務院秘書長
Transcriptions
Standard Mandarin
- Hanyu Pinyin: Zhōnghuá Rénmín Gònghéguó Guówùyuàn Mìshūzhǎng

Officially abbreviated as
- Simplified Chinese: 国务院秘书长
- Traditional Chinese: 國務院秘書長
Transcriptions
Standard Mandarin
- Hanyu Pinyin: Guówùyuàn Mìshūzhǎng

The Secretary-General of the State Council is an executive position within the State Council of the People's Republic of China. The secretary-general also leads the General Office of the State Council. The office ranks below the premier and above the ministers of various ministries and departments. The equivalent position in other political systems is the cabinet secretary.

The current secretary-general is Wu Zhenglong, who has been serving in the position since 12 March 2023. The officeholder is supported by a few deputy Secretaries-general of the State Council.

== Role ==
The secretary-general is nominated by the premier, who is then approved by the National People's Congress or its Standing Committee and appointed by the president. The secretary-general is responsible for the day-to-day work of the State Council and is in charge of the General Office of the State Council. The office ranks below the premier and above the ministers of various ministries and departments. The officeholder is supported by a few deputy secretaries-general of the State Council. The secretary-general is a member of the plenary meetings and the executive meetings of the State Council.

== List of secretaries-general ==
No.	Officeholder	Took office	Left office	Ref.
Secretary-General of the Government Administration Council of the Central People's Government
1	Li Weihan	October 1949	September 1953	
2	Xi Zhongxun	September 1953	September 1954	
Secretary-General of the State Council of the People's Republic of China
1	Xi Zhongxun	September 1954	January 1965	
2	Zhou Rongxin	January 1965	January 1975	
Post abolished (1975–1979)
3	Jin Ming	June 1979	February 1980	
4	Ji Pengfei	February 1980	May 1982	
5	Du Xingyuan (杜星垣)	May 1982	June 1983	
6	Tian Jiyun	June 1983	September 1985	
7	Chen Junsheng	September 1985	December 1988	
8	Luo Gan	December 1988	March 1998	
9	Wang Zhongyu	March 1998	March 2003	
10	Hua Jianmin	March 2003	March 2008	
11	Ma Kai	March 2008	March 2013	
12	Yang Jing	March 2013	March 2018	
13	Xiao Jie	March 2018	March 2023	
14	Wu Zhenglong	March 2023	Incumbent	
