= Vice Premier of China =

Senior official position in the government of China

Vice Premier of the State Council of the People's Republic of China
- 中华人民共和国国务院副总理
- National Emblem of China

- Flag of China

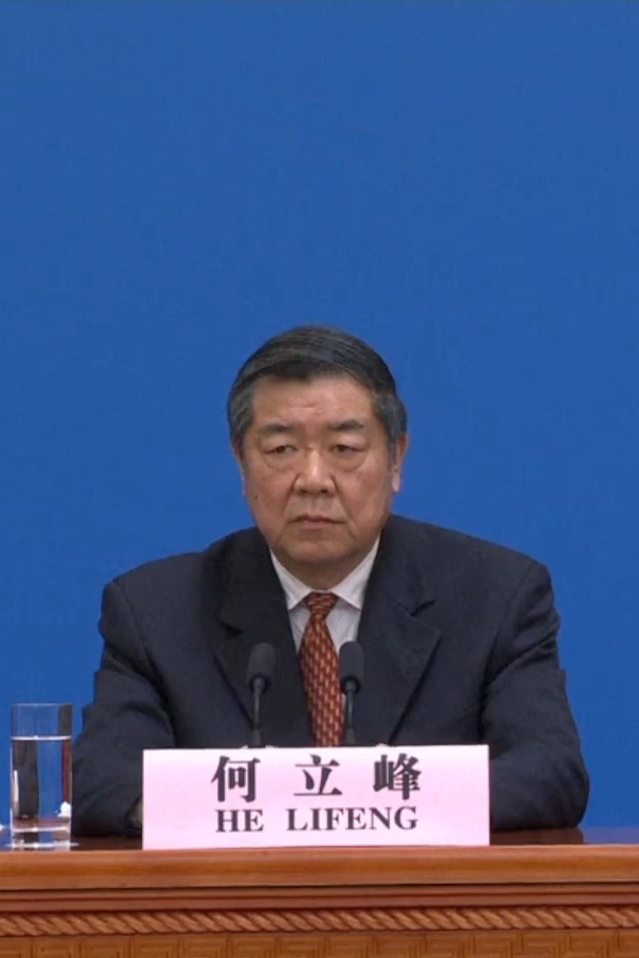
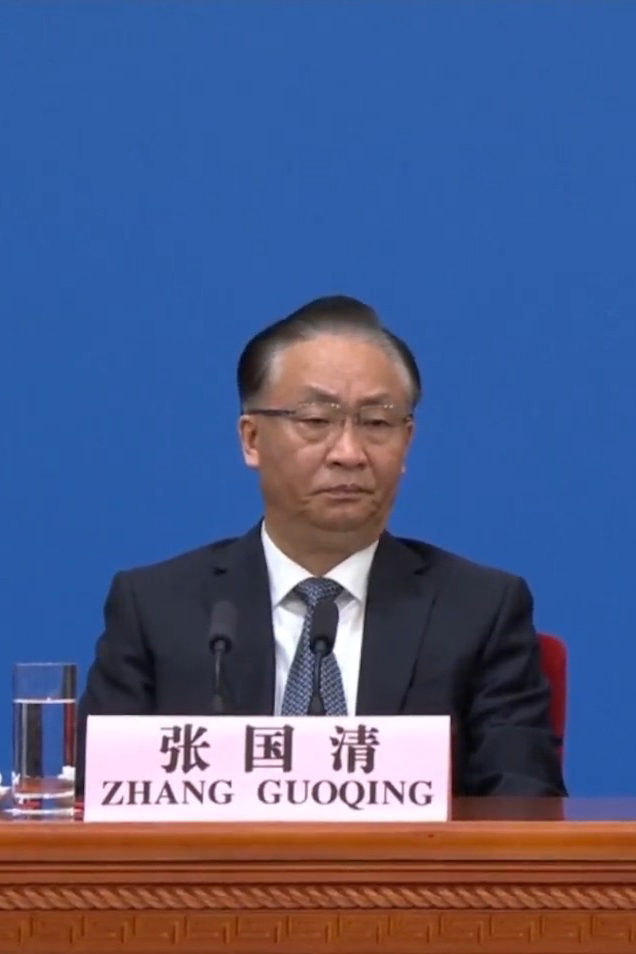
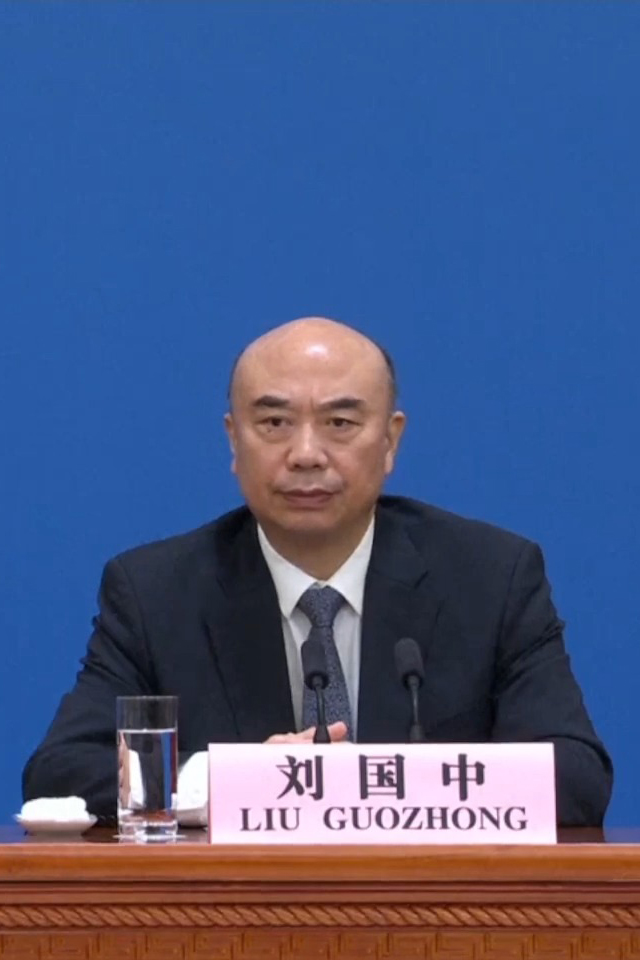
- Incumbent; Ding Xuexiang; He Lifeng; Zhang Guoqing; Liu Guozhong since 12 March 2023
- State Council of the People's Republic of China
- Style: Vice Premier (副总理) (informal)
- Status: Deputy national-level official
- Member of: Plenary Meeting of the State Council; Executive Meeting of the State Council; Politburo of the Chinese Communist Party
- Reports to: Premier of the State Council
- Residence: Premier's Office, Zhongnanhai
- Seat: Beijing
- Nominator: Premier of the State Council
- Appointer: President; pursuant to a National People's Congress decision
- Term length: Five years, renewable once consecutively
- Constituting instrument: Constitution of China
- Precursor: Vice Premier of the Government Administration Council of the Central People's Government
- Inaugural holder: Chen Yun
- Formation: September 1954; 72 years ago
- Website: State Council

Vice Premier of the State Council of the People's Republic of China
- Simplified Chinese: 中华人民共和国国务院副总理
- Traditional Chinese: 中華人民共和國國務院副總理
Transcriptions
Standard Mandarin
- Hanyu Pinyin: Zhōnghuá Rénmín Gònghéguó Guówùyuàn Fùzǒnglǐ
- Wade–Giles: Chung^{1}-hua^{2} Jên^{2}-min^{2} Kung^{4}-ho^{2}-kuo^{2} Kuo^{2}-wu^{4}-yüan^{4} Fu^{4}-tsung^{3}-li^{3}

Alternative Chinese name
- Simplified Chinese: 国务院副总理
- Traditional Chinese: 國務院副總理
Transcriptions
Standard Mandarin
- Hanyu Pinyin: Guówùyuàn Fùzǒnglǐ
- Wade–Giles: Kuo^{2}-wu^{4}-yüan^{4} Fu^{4}-tsung^{3}-li^{3}

The vice premier of the State Council of the People's Republic of China is the deputy leader within the State Council that assist the premier of the State Council in their duties.

In terms of administrative hierarchy, the vice premier holds a position superior to that of ministers, commission directors, and the Secretary-General of the State Council, while remaining subordinate to the Premier and holding a rank equivalent to that of state councillors. Generally, the title is held by multiple individuals at any given time, with each vice premier holding a broad portfolio of responsibilities. The first-ranking vice premier takes over duties of the premier at the time of the latter's incapacity. The incumbent vice premiers, in order of rank, are Ding Xuexiang, He Lifeng, Zhang Guoqing and Liu Guozhong.

The highest-ranked office holder is informally called the Senior Vice Premier or First Vice Premier (Chinese: 第一副总理) or Executive Vice Premier (Chinese: 常务副总理), a most prominent case being Deng Xiaoping in the mid-to-late 1970s. In irregular instances, the position of a senior vice premier has been named either to indicate degree of power, nominal power, or when the premier is incapacitated and requires a full-time deputy to carry out his regular duties.

== Selection ==
Officially, the vice premiers are appointed by the National People's Congress (NPC) upon the nomination of the premier. The NPC also has the power to remove the vice premiers and other state officers from office. Elections and removals are decided by majority vote. In practice, the vice premiers are chosen within the Chinese Communist Party (CCP) leadership, including the Politburo Standing Committee. Candidates for top positions including the vice premier are first approved first by the CCP's Politburo Standing Committee, and then by its Politburo, then approved in a special plenary session the Central Committee just before the NPC session for vote by the Congress, with the premier nominating the candidates during the NPC session.

The length of the vice premier's term of office is the same as the NPC, which is 5 years, and the vice premiers are restricted to two consecutive terms. Immediately after the election, the president signs the presidential order formalizing the appointment of the vice premiers. Since 2018, the vice premiers are required to collectively recite the constitutional oath of office before assuming office.

== Powers and authority ==
Vice premiers are the deputies to the premier, with each vice premier overseeing a certain area of administration. Vice premiers are members of the executive meetings of the State Council, along with the premier, secretary-general and state councillors. Additionally, all vice premiers have been members of the Politburo of the Chinese Communist Party in recent decades, with the first-ranked vice premier being a member of the Politburo Standing Committee.

== Current vice premiers ==
Portrait	Information		Posts
Ding Xuexiang	Rank	1st	Member of the Politburo Standing Committee (6th Ranked) Development and reform, education, science and technology, finance, ecology and environment, statistics, and intellectual property
Ding Xuexiang	Name	Ding Xuexiang	Member of the Politburo Standing Committee (6th Ranked) Development and reform, education, science and technology, finance, ecology and environment, statistics, and intellectual property
Ding Xuexiang	Constituency	Liaoning At-large	Member of the Politburo Standing Committee (6th Ranked) Development and reform, education, science and technology, finance, ecology and environment, statistics, and intellectual property
Ding Xuexiang	Birthplace	Nantong, Jiangsu	Member of the Politburo Standing Committee (6th Ranked) Development and reform, education, science and technology, finance, ecology and environment, statistics, and intellectual property
Ding Xuexiang	Took office	12 March 2023	Member of the Politburo Standing Committee (6th Ranked) Development and reform, education, science and technology, finance, ecology and environment, statistics, and intellectual property
He Lifeng	Rank	2nd	Member of the Politburo Public finance, natural resource management, housing and urban development, transportation, commerce
He Lifeng	Name	He Lifeng	Member of the Politburo Public finance, natural resource management, housing and urban development, transportation, commerce
He Lifeng	Constituency	Inner Mongolia At-large	Member of the Politburo Public finance, natural resource management, housing and urban development, transportation, commerce
He Lifeng	Birthplace	Xingning, Guangdong	Member of the Politburo Public finance, natural resource management, housing and urban development, transportation, commerce
He Lifeng	Took office	12 March 2023	Member of the Politburo Public finance, natural resource management, housing and urban development, transportation, commerce
Zhang Guoqing	Rank	3rd	Member of the Politburo Industry and information technology, emergency management, and state-owned enterprises
Zhang Guoqing	Name	Zhang Guoqing	Member of the Politburo Industry and information technology, emergency management, and state-owned enterprises
Zhang Guoqing	Constituency	Tibet At-large	Member of the Politburo Industry and information technology, emergency management, and state-owned enterprises
Zhang Guoqing	Birthplace	Luoshan County, Henan	Member of the Politburo Industry and information technology, emergency management, and state-owned enterprises
Zhang Guoqing	Took office	12 March 2023	Member of the Politburo Industry and information technology, emergency management, and state-owned enterprises
Liu Guozhong	Rank	4th	Member of the Politburo Agriculture and rural affairs, health, poverty alleviation, and meteorology
Liu Guozhong	Name	Liu Guozhong	Member of the Politburo Agriculture and rural affairs, health, poverty alleviation, and meteorology
Liu Guozhong	Constituency	Henan At-large	Member of the Politburo Agriculture and rural affairs, health, poverty alleviation, and meteorology
Liu Guozhong	Birthplace	Wangkui County, Heilongjiang	Member of the Politburo Agriculture and rural affairs, health, poverty alleviation, and meteorology
Liu Guozhong	Took office	12 March 2023	Member of the Politburo Agriculture and rural affairs, health, poverty alleviation, and meteorology

== See also ==
- Orders of precedence in China
- Politics of China
