= State Council of China =

Chief administrative authority

State Council of the People's Republic of China
- 中华人民共和国国务院
- Central government
- Emblem

Overview
- Established: 27 September 1954; 72 years ago
- Country: China
- Leader: Premier
- Leader Name: Li Qiang
- Appointed by: President
- Main organ: General Office
- Ministries: 26 cabinet-level constituent departments
- Responsible to: National People's Congress and its Standing Committee
- Annual budget: $4.35 trillion (2026)
- Headquarters: State Council Office Secretariat, Zhongnanhai, Beijing
- Website: english.www.gov.cn

State Council of China
- Simplified Chinese: 中华人民共和国国务院
- Traditional Chinese: 中華人民共和國國務院
- Literal meaning: "People's Republic of China State Affairs Court"
Transcriptions
Standard Mandarin
- Hanyu Pinyin: Zhōnghuá Rénmín Gònghéguó Guówùyuàn

State Council (commonly used abbreviation)
- Simplified Chinese: 国务院
- Traditional Chinese: 國務院
- Literal meaning: "The Court of State Affairs"
Transcriptions
Standard Mandarin
- Hanyu Pinyin: Guówùyuàn
- IPA: [kwǒ.û.ɥɛ̂n]

Central People's Government (Constitutional synonym)
- Chinese: 中央人民政府
- Literal meaning: Central People Government
Transcriptions
Standard Mandarin
- Hanyu Pinyin: Zhōngyāng Rénmín Zhèngfǔ

The State Council of the People's Republic of China, synonymous with Central People's Government, is the supreme administrative organ of the country's unified state apparatus and the executive organ of the National People's Congress (NPC), the supreme organ of state power. It is composed of a premier, vice premiers, state councilors, ministers, chairpersons of commissions, an auditor-general, the governor of the People's Bank of China, and a secretary-general.

The Government Administration Council of the Central People's Government was established in 1949 with the proclamation of the People's Republic of China. Under the 1954 constitution, the Government Administration Council was succeeded by the State Council, which became the supreme administrative organ of the state. Since 1982, the State Council has undergone institutional reforms every five years. The main functions of the State Council are to formulate administrative measures, issue decisions and orders, and monitor their implementation; draft legislative bills for submission to the NPC or its Standing Committee; and prepare the economic plan and the state budget for deliberation and approval by the NPC.

The premier of the State Council is responsible for the State Council and exercises overall leadership of its work. The secretary-general of the State Council, under the leadership of the premier, is responsible for handling the daily work of the State Council and heads the General Office of the State Council. The premier is appointed by the NPC after a nomination from the president; the premier then nominates members of the State Council for appointment by the NPC or its Standing Committee. The executive meeting of the State Council, consisting of the premier, vice premiers, state councilors, and the secretary-general, is held two to three times a month, while the plenary meeting, consisting of all members of the State Council, is held every six months.

The State Council directly oversees provincial-level People's Governments, and in practice maintains membership with top levels of the Chinese Communist Party (CCP). The State Council is constitutionally accountable to the NPC and its Standing Committee. The Organic Law of the State Council outlines that the State Council is led by the CCP Central Committee and follows CCP ideology. Aside from a few, members of the State Council are also members of the CCP Central Committee.

== Terminology ==
The current state constitution states that the State Council of the People's Republic of China and the Central People's Government are synonymous. The State Council also uses the term Government of the People's Republic of China when concluding treaties with foreign countries. The term can refer to the Central People's Government in a narrow sense and to the Central People's Government and local governments at all levels in a broad sense.

== History ==
The predecessor of the State Council was the Government Administration Council of the Central People's Government, which was established on 1 October 1949 with the proclamation of the People's Republic of China. However, the Government Administration Council was lower in status and had a smaller scope of authority than the State Council; the State Council is equal to the Central People's Government, while the Government Administration Council was only a constituent body of the Central People's Government. The Government Administration Council did not have the authority to manage military affairs, so it did not have a Ministry of National Defense under it.

In September 1954, the first session of the 1st National People's Congress adopted the 1954 state constitution and the Organic Law of the State Council, among other things. According to the constitution, the National People's Congress (NPC) is the supreme organ of state power; the State Council is the executive organ of the NPC and the highest administrative organ of the state. Since 1982, the State Council has undergone several institutional reforms, with adjustments made on average every five years to coincide with each change of government. The most recent adjustment was in 2023. The number of departments under the State Council has been reduced from 100 before 1982 to 26 today.

== Organization ==
The State Council is described by the Chinese constitution as the executive organ of the National People's Congress (NPC), as well as the "highest state administrative organ". Constitutionally, the main functions of the State Council are to formulate administrative measures, issue decisions and orders, and monitor their implementation; draft legislative bills for submission to the NPC or its Standing Committee; and prepare the economic plan and the state budget for deliberation and approval by the NPC. The State Council has flexibility in decision-making, especially with regard to economic matters, but the Politburo has ultimate authority. According to the Organic Law of the State Council, the CCP Central Committee exercises leadership over the State Council. The law also stipulates the State Council must follow the CCP's ideology and policies.

=== Composition ===
The State Council is composed of the premier, several vice premiers, several state councillors, ministers of ministries, directors of committees, the auditor general, and the secretary-general. The premier leads the State Council and is appointed by the NPC upon the nomination by the president, though in practice the premier is chosen within the CCP leadership, including the Politburo Standing Committee. The vice premiers (one executive and generally three others), state councillors, and a secretary-general (who normally also serves as a state councillor) all assist the premier. The premier leads the Leading Party Members Group, which responsible for overseeing the implementation of CCP Central Committee policies in the State Council.

Each vice premier oversees certain areas of administration in support of the premier. In practice, the vice premiers and State Councillors assume responsibility for one or more sectors or issues, and remain in contact with the various bodies responsible for policy related to that area. This allows the Standing Committee to oversee a wide range of government functions. Each State Councillor performs duties as designated by the Premier. The secretary-general heads the General Office which handles the day-to-day work of the State Council.

The State Council includes 26 constituent departments, and oversees the province-level governments throughout China. Each ministry supervises one sector. Commissions outrank ministries and set policies for and coordinate the related activities of different administrative organs. Offices deal with matters of ongoing concern. The establishment, dissolution, or merger of the constituent departments are proposed by the premier and decided by the NPC or its Standing Committee. Bureaus and administrations rank below ministries. In addition to the ministries, there are 38 centrally administered government organizations that report directly to the state council. The heads of these organizations attend full meetings of the state committee on an irregular basis.

The State Council controls the Ministry for National Defense but does not control the People's Liberation Army, which is instead controlled by the Central Military Commission (CMC). The State Council previously had joint command over the People's Armed Police (PAP) together with the CMC, principally through the Ministry of Public Security, though 2018 reforms placed the PAP solely under CMC command.

=== Meetings ===
The plenary meeting of the State Council meets every six months, composed of all members of the State Council. Between meetings it is guided by an executive meeting of the State Council which is held two to three times a month, and can be called at the discretion of the premier. The Executive Meeting is composed of the premier, vice premiers, state councilors, and the secretary-general.

== Members ==
=== Executive Meeting ===
Members of the Executive Meeting of the 14th State Council (March 2023 – March 2028)
| # | Office | Portrait | Name | Party | Party memberships |
|---|---|---|---|---|---|
| 1 | Premier | | Li Qiang 李强 | CCP | Politburo Standing Committee Secretary, Leading Party Members Group |
| 2 | Vice Premier (first-ranked) | | Ding Xuexiang 丁薛祥 | CCP | Politburo Standing Committee Deputy Secretary, Leading Party Members Group |
| 3 | Vice Premier | | He Lifeng 何立峰 | CCP | Politburo Leading Party Members Group |
| 4 | Vice Premier | | Zhang Guoqing 张国清 | CCP | Politburo Leading Party Members Group |
| 5 | Vice Premier | | Liu Guozhong 刘国中 | CCP | Politburo Leading Party Members Group |
| 6 | State Councillor Minister of Public Security | | Wang Xiaohong 王小洪 | CCP | Secretariat Deputy Secretary, Central Political and Legal Affairs Commission Leading Party Members Group |
| 7 | State Councillor Secretary-General of the State Council | | Wu Zhenglong 吴政隆 | CCP | Leading Party Members Group Secretary, Party Group of the State Council Organs |
| 8 | State Councillor | | Shen Yiqin 谌贻琴 | CCP | Leading Party Members Group |

=== Constituent departments ===
The 14th State Council has 26 constituent departments.

Constituent Departments of the 14th State Council (March 2023 – March 2028)
| # | Logo | Name of department | Year established | Incumbent chief | Party | Reports to |
|---|---|---|---|---|---|---|
| 1 | | Ministry of Foreign Affairs 外交部 | 1949 (CPG); 1954 (PRC) | Wang Yi 王毅; Minister of Foreign Affairs | CCP | General Secretary Xi Jinping ∟ Director of the Office of the Central Foreign Affairs Commission Wang Yi (himself) |
| 2 | | Ministry of National Defense 国防部 | 1954 | Dong Jun 董军; Minister of National Defense | CCP | General Secretary Xi Jinping (Chairman of the Central Military Commission) |
| 3 | | National Development and Reform Commission 国家发展和改革委员会 | 2003 | Zheng Shanjie 郑栅洁; Chairman of the National Development and Reform Commission | CCP | Vice Premier Ding Xuexiang |
| 4 | | Ministry of Education 教育部 | 1949 (CPG); 1954 (PRC) | Huai Jinpeng 怀进鹏; Minister of Education | CCP | Vice Premier Ding Xuexiang |
| 5 | | Ministry of Science and Technology 科学技术部 | 1998 | Yin Hejun 阴和俊; Minister of Science and Technology | CCP | Vice Premier Ding Xuexiang |
| 6 | | Ministry of Industry and Information Technology 工业和信息化部 | 2008 | Li Lecheng 李乐成; Minister of Industry and Information Technology | CCP | Vice Premier Zhang Guoqing |
| 7 | | National Ethnic Affairs Commission 国家民族事务委员会 | 1949 (CPG); 1954 (PRC) | Pan Yue 潘岳; Director of the National Ethnic Affairs Commission | CCP | Shi Taifeng (Head of the CCP Central Committee United Front Work Department) |
| 8 | | Ministry of Public Security 公安部 | 1949 (CPG); 1954 (PRC) | Police Commissioner-General; Wang Xiaohong 王小洪 State Councillor; Minister of Public Security | CCP | Chen Wenqing (Secretary of the CCP Central Political and Legal Affairs Commission) |
| 9 | | Ministry of State Security 国家安全部 | 1983 | Chen Yixin 陈一新; Minister of State Security | CCP | Chen Wenqing (Secretary of the CCP Central Political and Legal Affairs Commission) |
| 10 | | Ministry of Civil Affairs 民政部 | 1978 | Lu Zhiyuan 陆治原; Minister of Civil Affairs | CCP | State Councillor Shen Yiqin |
| 11 | | Ministry of Justice 司法部 | 1949 (CPG); 1954 (PRC); 1979 (re-established) | He Rong 贺荣; Minister of Justice | CCP | Chen Wenqing (Secretary of the CCP Central Political and Legal Affairs Commission) |
| 12 | | Ministry of Finance 财政部 | 1949 (CPG); 1954 (PRC) | Lan Fo'an 蓝佛安; Minister of Finance | CCP | Vice Premier Ding Xuexiang |
| 13 | | Ministry of Human Resources and Social Security 人力资源和社会保障部 | 2008 | Wang Xiaoping 王晓萍; Ministry of Human Resources and Social Security | CCP | State Councillor Shen Yiqin |
| 14 | | Ministry of Natural Resources 自然资源部 | 2018 | Guan Zhi'ou 关志鸥; Minister of Natural Resources | CCP | Vice Premier Ding Xuexiang |
| 15 | | Ministry of Ecology and Environment 生态环境部 | 2018 | Huang Runqiu 黄润秋; Minister of Ecology and Environment | JS | Vice Premier Ding Xuexiang |
| 16 | | Ministry of Housing and Urban–Rural Development 住房和城乡建设部 | 2008 | Ni Hong 倪虹; Minister of Housing and Urban–Rural Development | CCP | Vice Premier He Lifeng |
| 17 | | Ministry of Transport 交通运输部 | 2008 | Liu Wei 李小鹏; Minister of Transport | CCP | Vice Premier He Lifeng |
| 18 | | Ministry of Water Resources 水利部 | 1949 (CPG); 1954 (PRC) | Li Guoying 李国英; Minister of Water Resources | CCP | Vice Premier Liu Guozhong |
| 19 | | Ministry of Agriculture and Rural Affairs 农业农村部 | 2018 | Han Jun 韩俊; Minister of Agriculture and Rural Affairs | CCP | Vice Premier Liu Guozhong |
| 20 | | Ministry of Commerce 商务部 | 2003 | Wang Wentao 王文涛; Minister of Commerce | CCP | Vice Premier He Lifeng |
| 21 | | Ministry of Culture and Tourism 文化和旅游部 | 2018 | Sun Yeli 孙业礼; Minister of Culture and Tourism | CCP | Li Shulei (Head of the CCP Central Committee Publicity Department) |
| 22 | | National Health Commission 国家卫生健康委员会 | 2018 | Lei Haichao 雷海潮; Head of the National Health Commission | CCP | Vice Premier Liu Guozhong |
| 23 | | Ministry of Veterans Affairs 退役军人事务部 | 2018 | Pei Jinjia 裴金佳; Minister of Veterans Affairs | CCP | State Councillor Shen Yiqin |
| 24 | | Ministry of Emergency Management 应急管理部 | 2018 | Zhang Chengzhong 张成中; Minister of Emergency Management | CCP | Vice Premier Zhang Guoqing |
| 25 | | People's Bank of China 中国人民银行 | 1948 | Pan Gongsheng 潘功胜; Governor of the People's Bank of China | CCP | Vice Premier He Lifeng (Director of the Central Financial and Economic Affairs Commission Office) |
| 26 | | National Audit Office 审计署 | 1983 | Hou Kai 侯凯; Auditor-General of the National Audit Office | CCP | Premier Li Qiang ∟ Vice Premier Ding Xuexiang |

The Ministry of Education retains the external nameplate of the National Language Working Committee. The Ministry of Industry and Information Technology retains the external nameplates of China National Space Administration and of China Atomic Energy Authority. The Ministry of Human Resources and Social Security is supplemented with the nameplate of the State Administration of Foreign Experts Affairs. The Ministry of Natural Resources retains the external nameplate of the State Oceanic Administration. The Ministry of Ecology and Environment retains the external nameplate of the National Nuclear Safety Administration. The Ministry of Agriculture and Rural Affairs is supplemented with the nameplate of the National Rural Revitalization Administration.

== See also ==
- Department of State Affairs in the Three Departments and Six Ministries system
- Ming dynasty: Central Secretariat → Grand Secretariat
- Qing dynasty: Grand Secretariat → Grand Council → Cabinet
- Republic of China: State Council (1912–28) → Executive Yuan (1928–present)
- People's Republic of China: Government Administration Council of the Central People's Government (1949–54); Constituent departments of the PRC
- Government of Hong Kong
- Government of Macau
