= 12th State Council of China =

Chinese government headed by Premier Li Keqiang

Li Keqiang government 李克强政府
- 12th State Council of China

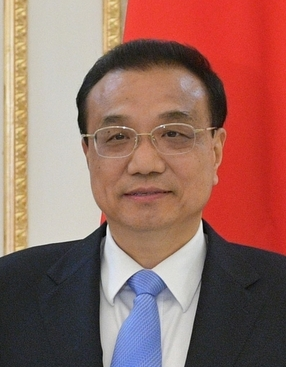
- Li Keqiang in November 2019
- Date formed: 15 March 2013
- Date dissolved: 18 March 2018

People and organisations
- Premier: Li Keqiang
- Vice Premiers: 1st: Zhang Gaoli; 2nd: Liu Yandong; 3rd: Wang Yang; 4th: Ma Kai
- No. of ministers: 35
- Ministers removed: 16
- Total no. of members: 49
- Member party: Chinese Communist Party; Eight minor parties
- Status in legislature: One-party state

History
- Election: First session of the 12th National People's Congress
- Legislature term: 12th National People's Congress
- Predecessor: 11th State Council of China
- Successor: 13th State Council of China

Li Keqiang Government
- Simplified Chinese: 李克强政府
- Traditional Chinese: 李克強政府
Transcriptions
Standard Mandarin
- Hanyu Pinyin: Lǐ Kèqiáng Zhèngfǔ

Li Keqiang Cabinet
- Simplified Chinese: 李克强内阁
- Traditional Chinese: 李克強內閣
Transcriptions
Standard Mandarin
- Hanyu Pinyin: Lǐ Kèqiáng Nèigé

The 12th State Council of China lasted from March 2013 to March 2018, under the Li Keqiang premiership. It succeeded the Wen Jiabao government. Premier Li was ranked only second to CCP general secretary Xi Jinping among 7 members of the 18th and 19th Politburo Standing Committee, top decision-making body of the Chinese Communist Party (CCP).

During the 1st Session of the 12th National People's Congress in March 2013, Li Keqiang was appointed by new President Xi Jinping to replace Wen Jiabao as Premier of the State Council, China's head of government, according to the approval of the National People's Congress.

== 12th State Council ==
Li Keqiang Cabinet I (Members of the 12th State Council) March 2013 – March 2018
Office	Officeholder	Birth year	Party	Took office	Left office
Premier	Li Keqiang 李克强	1955	CCP (PSC)	2013	2018
First Vice Premier	Zhang Gaoli 张高丽	1947	CCP (PSC)	2013	2018
Vice Premier	Liu Yandong 刘延东 (female)	1945	CCP (Politburo)	2013	2018
Vice Premier	Wang Yang 汪洋	1955	CCP (Politburo)	2013	2018
Vice Premier	Ma Kai 马凯	1946	CCP (Politburo)	2013	2018
State Councilor; Secretary-General (General Office); Chinese Academy of Governance	Yang Jing 杨晶 (Mongol)	1953	CCP	2013	2018 (dismissed)
State Councilor; Minister of National Defense	General Chang Wanquan 常万全	1949	CCP	2013	2018
State Councilor	Yang Jiechi 杨洁篪	1950	CCP	2013	2018
State Councilor; Ministry of Public Security	PCG (Note: Police Commissioner-General) Guo Shengkun 郭声琨	1954	CCP	2013	2017
Ministry of Public Security	PCG Zhao Kezhi 赵克志	1953	CCP	2017	2018
State Councilor	Wang Yong 王勇	1955	CCP	2013	2018
Ministry of Foreign Affairs	Wang Yi 王毅	1953	CCP	2013	2018
National Development and Reform Commission	He Lifeng 何立峰	1955	CCP	2017	2018
Ministry of Education	Chen Baosheng 陈宝生	1956	CCP	2016	2018
Ministry of Science and Technology	Wan Gang 万钢	1952	Zhi Gong Party (chairman)	2007	2018
Ministry of Industry and Information Technology	Miao Wei 苗圩	1955	CCP	2010	2018
State Ethnic Affairs Commission	Bagatur ᠪᠠᠭᠠᠲᠤᠷ 巴特尔 (Mongol)	1955	CCP	2016	2018
Ministry of State Security	PCG Chen Wenqing 陈文清	1960	CCP	2016	2018
Ministry of Supervision; National Bureau of Corruption Prevention	Yang Xiaodu 杨晓渡	1953	CCP	2016	2018
Ministry of Civil Affairs	Huang Shuxian 黄树贤	1954	CCP	2016	2018
Ministry of Justice	Zhang Jun 张军	1956	CCP	2017	2018
Ministry of Finance	Xiao Jie 肖捷	1957	CCP	2016	2018
Ministry of Human Resources and Social Security	Yin Weimin 尹蔚民	1953	CCP	2007	2018
Ministry of Land and Resources	CIL (Note: Chief Inspector of Land) Jiang Daming 姜大明	1953	CCP	2013	2018
Ministry of Environmental Protection	Li Ganjie 李干杰	1964	CCP	2017	2018
Ministry of Housing and Urban-Rural Development	Wang Menghui 王蒙徽	1960	CCP	2017	2018
Ministry of Transport	Li Xiaopeng 李小鹏	1959	CCP	2016	2018
Ministry of Water Resources	Chen Lei 陈雷	1954	CCP	2007	2018
Ministry of Agriculture	Han Changfu 韩长赋	1954	CCP	2009	2018
Ministry of Commerce	Zhong Shan 钟山	1955	CCP	2017	2018
Ministry of Culture	Luo Shugang 雒树刚	1955	CCP	2014	2018
National Health and Family Planning Commission	Li Bin 李斌 (female)	1954	CCP	2013	2018
People's Bank of China	Zhou Xiaochuan 周小川	1948	CCP	2002	2018
National Audit Office	Hu Zejun 胡泽君 (female)	1955	CCP	2017	2018

== Other ministry-level and sub-ministry-level agencies ==
=== Special organization directly under the State Council ===
Ministry-level

Logo	Agency	Chief	Birth year	Party	Took office	Left office
	State-owned Assets Supervision and Administration Commission of the State Council 国务院国有资产监督管理委员会	Jiang Jiemin 蒋洁敏	1954	CCP	March 2013	December 2013
	State-owned Assets Supervision and Administration Commission of the State Council 国务院国有资产监督管理委员会	Zhang Yi 张毅	1950	CCP	December 2013	February 2016
	State-owned Assets Supervision and Administration Commission of the State Council 国务院国有资产监督管理委员会	Xiao Yaqing 肖亚庆	1959	CCP	February 2016	March 2023

=== Organizations directly under the State Council ===
Ministry-level

Agency	Chief	Birth year	Party	Took office	Left office
General Administration of Customs of the People's Republic of China 中华人民共和国海关总署	CCG (Note: Customs Commissioner-General) Ni Yuefeng 倪岳峰	1964	CCP	2018	March 2023
State Administration of Taxation 国家税务总局	Wang Jun 王军	1958	CCP	2013	2018
State Administration for Industry and Commerce of the People's Republic of China (SAIC) 中华人民共和国国家工商行政管理总局	Zhang Mao 张茅	1954	CCP	2013	2018 (agency abolished)
General Administration of Quality Supervision, Inspection and Quarantine of the People's Republic of China (AQSIQ) 中华人民共和国国家质量监督检验检疫总局	Zhi Shuping 支树平	1953	CCP	2010	2018 (agency abolished)
State Administration of Press, Publication, Radio, Film and Television of the People's Republic of China (SAPPRFT) 中华人民共和国国家新闻出版广电总局	Nie Chenxi 聂辰席	1957	CCP	2016	2018 (agency abolished)
State General Administration of Sports 国家体育总局	Gou Zhongwen 苟仲文	1957	CCP	2016	
State Administration of Work Safety 国家安全生产监督管理总局	Wang Yupu 王玉普	1956	CCP	2017	2018 (agency abolished)
China Food and Drug Administration 国家食品药品监督管理总局	Bi Jingquan 毕井泉	1955	CCP	2015	2018 (agency abolished)
Counselor's Office of the State Council 国务院参事室	Wang Zhongwei 王仲伟	1955	CCP	2015	

Sub-ministry-level

Agency	Chief	Birth year	Party	Took office	Left office
National Bureau of Statistics of the People's Republic of China 中华人民共和国国家统计局	Ning Jizhe 宁吉喆	1956	CCP	2016	2018
State Forestry Administration 国家林业局	Zhang Jianlong 张建龙	1957	CCP	2015	2018 (agency abolished)
State Intellectual Property Office of the People's Republic of China 中华人民共和国国家知识产权局 under the State Market Regulatory Administration from 2018	Shen Changyu 申长雨	1963	CCP	2013	2018
China National Tourism Administration 中华人民共和国国家旅游局	Li Jinzao 李金早	1958	CCP	2014	2018 (agency abolished)
State Administration for Religious Affairs 国家宗教事务局 absorbed into the United Front Work Department of the CCP Central Committee from 2018	Wang Zuoan 王作安	1958	CCP	2009	
National Government Offices Administration 国家机关事务管理局	Li Baorong 李宝荣	1958	CCP	2015	

=== Administrative Offices under the State Council ===
Ministry-level

Agency	Chief	Birth year	Party	Took office	Left office
Hong Kong and Macao Affairs Office of the State Council 国务院港澳事务办公室	Wang Guangya 王光亚	1950	CCP	2010	2017
Hong Kong and Macao Affairs Office of the State Council 国务院港澳事务办公室	Zhang Xiaoming 张晓明	1963	CCP	2017	March 2023
State Council Research Office 国务院研究室	Ning Jizhe 宁吉喆	1956	CCP	2013	2015
State Council Research Office 国务院研究室	Huang Shouhong 黄守宏	1964	CCP	2016	March 2023
Legislative Affairs Office of the State Council 国务院法制办公室	Song Dahan 宋大涵	1952	CCP	2010	2018 (agency abolished)
Overseas Chinese Affairs Office of the State Council 国务院侨务办公室 absorbed into the United Front Work Department of the CCP Central Committee from 2018	Qiu Yuanping 裘援平 (female)	1953	CCP	2013	2018
Taiwan Affairs Office of the State Council 国务院台湾事务办公室; Taiwan Work Office of the CCP Central Committee 中共中央台湾工作办公室	Liu Jieyi 刘结一	1957	CCP	2018	March 2023
State Council Information Office 国务院新闻办公室; Foreign Publicity Office of the CCP Central Committee 中共中央对外宣传办公室	Jiang Jianguo 蒋建国	1956	CCP	2013	March 2023
Cyberspace Administration of China 国家互联网信息办公室; Office of the Central Cyberspace Affairs Commission 中央网络安全和信息化委员会办公室	Xu Lin 徐麟	1963	CCP	2016	March 2023

=== Institutions directly under the State Council ===
Ministry-level

Agency	Chief	Birth year	Party	Took office	Left office
Xinhua News Agency 新华通讯社	Cai Mingzhao 蔡名照	1955	CCP	2014	March 2023
Chinese Academy of Sciences (CAS) 中国科学院	Bai Chunli 白春礼	1953	CCP	2011	March 2023
Chinese Academy of Social Sciences (CASS) 中国社会科学院	Wang Weiguang 王伟光	1950	CCP	2013	2018
Chinese Academy of Social Sciences (CASS) 中国社会科学院	Xie Fuzhan 谢伏瞻	1954	CCP	2018	March 2023
Chinese Academy of Engineering (CAE) 中国工程院	Zhou Ji 周济	1946	CCP	2010	2018
Chinese Academy of Engineering (CAE) 中国工程院	Li Xiaohong 李晓红	1959	CCP	2018	March 2023
Development Research Center of the State Council 国务院发展研究中心	Li Wei 李伟	1953	CCP	2011	March 2023
China Media Group (CMG or Voice of China) 中央广播电视总台	Shen Haixiong 慎海雄	1967	CCP	2018	March 2023
China Banking and Insurance Regulatory Commission (CBIRC) 中国银行保险监督管理委员会	Guo Shuqing 郭树清	1956	CCP	2018	March 2023
China Banking Regulatory Commission (CBRC) 中国银行业监督管理委员会	Guo Shuqing 郭树清	1956	CCP	2017	2018 (agency abolished)
China Insurance Regulatory Commission (CIRC) 中国保险监督管理委员会	Xiang Junbo 项俊波	1957	CCP (expelled 2017)	2011	2017 (dismissed)
China Securities Regulatory Commission (CSRC) 中国证券监督管理委员会	Liu Shiyu 刘士余	1961	CCP	2016	March 2023
National Council for Social Security Fund 全国社会保障基金理事会 under the Ministry of Finance from 2018	Lou Jiwei 楼继伟	1950	CCP	2016	March 2023
National Natural Science Foundation 国家自然科学基金委员会 under the Ministry of Science and Technology from 2018	Li Jinghai 李静海	1956	CCP	2018	March 2023
Chinese Academy of Governance 国家行政学院 absorbed into the Central Party School from 2018	Yang Jing 杨晶	1953	CCP	2013	2018

Sub-ministry-level

Logo	Agency	Chief	Birth year	Party	Took office	Left office
	China Meteorological Administration 中国气象局	Liu Yaming 刘雅鸣 (female)	1957	CCP	2016	March 2023
	China Meteorological Administration 中国气象局	Zheng Guoguang 郑国光	1959	CCP	2007	2016
	China Earthquake Administration 中国地震局 under the Ministry of Emergency Management from 2018	Zheng Guoguang 郑国光	1959	CCP	2016	March 2023

=== National Administrations administered by ministry-level agencies ===
Sub-ministry-level

Agency	Ministered by	Chief	Birth year	Party	Took office	Left office
State Bureau for Letters and Calls 国家信访局	State Council General Office	Shu Xiaoqin 舒晓琴 (female)	1956	CCP	2013	March 2023
State Administration of Grain 国家粮食局	National Development and Reform Commission	Zhang Wufeng 张务锋	1960	CCP	2017	2018 (agency abolished)
State Administration of Grain and Reserves 国家粮食和物资储备局	National Development and Reform Commission	Zhang Wufeng 张务锋	1960	CCP	2018	March 2023
National Energy Administration 国家能源局	National Development and Reform Commission	Nur Bekri 努尔·白克力 نۇر بەكرى	1961	CCP	2014	March 2023
State Administration of Science, Technology and Industry for National Defence 国家国防科技工业局	Ministry of Industry and Information Technology	Xu Dazhe 许达哲	1956	CCP	2013	2016
State Administration of Science, Technology and Industry for National Defence 国家国防科技工业局	Ministry of Industry and Information Technology	Tang Dengjie 唐登杰	1964	CCP	2017	2018
State Administration of Science, Technology and Industry for National Defence 国家国防科技工业局	Ministry of Industry and Information Technology	Zhang Kejian 张克俭	1961	CCP	2018	March 2023
State Tobacco Monopoly Administration 国家烟草专卖局	Ministry of Industry and Information Technology	Ling Chengxing 凌成兴	1957	CCP	2013	2018
State Tobacco Monopoly Administration 国家烟草专卖局	Ministry of Industry and Information Technology	Zhang Jianmin 张建民	1964	CCP	2018	March 2023
State Immigration Administration 国家移民管理局; Entry-Exit Administration of the People's Republic of China 中华人民共和国出入境管理局	Ministry of Public Security	Xu Ganlu 许甘露	1962	CCP	2018	March 2023
State Forestry and Grassland Administration 国家林业和草原局; State Administration For National Parks 国家公园管理局	Ministry of Natural Resources	Zhang Jianlong 张建龙	1957	CCP	2018	March 2023
State Administration of Foreign Experts Affairs 国家外国专家局 absorbed into the Ministry of Science and Technology from 2018	Ministry of Human Resources and Social Security	Zhang Jianguo 张建国	1957	CCP	2011	
State Bureau of Civil Servants 国家公务员局 absorbed into the Organization Department of the CCP Central Committee from 2018	Ministry of Human Resources and Social Security	Fu Xingguo 傅兴国	1960	CCP	2016	
State Oceanic Administration 国家海洋局 absorbed into the Ministry of Natural Resources from 2018	Ministry of Land and Resources (abolished 2018)	Wang Hong 王宏	1963	CCP	2015	2018
State Bureau of Surveying and Mapping 国家测绘地理信息局 absorbed into the Ministry of Natural Resources from 2018	Ministry of Land and Resources (abolished 2018)	Kurexi Maihesuti 库热西·买合苏提 كۈرەش مەخسۇت	1960	CCP	2014	2018 (agency abolished)
Civil Aviation Administration of China 中国民用航空局	Ministry of Transport	Feng Zhenglin 冯正霖	1957	CCP	2015	
National Railway Administration 国家铁路局	Ministry of Transport	Yang Yudong 杨宇栋	1968	CCP	2016	
State Post Bureau 国家邮政局	Ministry of Transport	Ma Junsheng 马军胜	1961	CCP	2006	
State Administration of Cultural Heritage 国家文物局	Ministry of Culture (abolished 2018); Ministry of Culture and Tourism (established 2018)	Liu Yuzhu 刘玉珠	1957	CCP	2015	
State Administration of Traditional Chinese Medicine 国家中医药管理局	National Health and Family Planning Commission	Wang Guoqiang 王国强	1955	CCP	2007	2018
State Administration of Traditional Chinese Medicine 国家中医药管理局	National Health Commission	Zeng Yixin 曾益新	1962	CCP	2018	2018
State Administration of Traditional Chinese Medicine 国家中医药管理局	National Health Commission	Yu Wenming 于文明	1963	CPWDP (Vice-chairman)	2018	March 2023
National Bureau of Disease Control and Prevention 国家疾病预防控制局	National Health Commission	Wang Hesheng 王贺胜	1961	CCP	2021	March 2023
State Administration of Foreign Exchange 国家外汇管理局	People's Bank of China	Yi Gang 易纲	1958	CCP	2009	2018
State Administration of Foreign Exchange 国家外汇管理局	People's Bank of China	Pan Gongsheng 潘功胜	1963	CCP	2018	March 2023
State Administration of Coal Mine Safety 国家煤矿安全监察局 (abolished 2020)	State Administration of Work Safety (abolished 2018)	Huang Yuzhi 黄玉治	1960	CCP	2014	2020
State Administration of Coal Mine Safety 国家煤矿安全监察局 (abolished 2020)	Ministry of Emergency Management (established 2018)	Huang Yuzhi 黄玉治	1960	CCP	2014	2020
National Mine Safety Administration 国家矿山安全监察局 (established 2020)	Ministry of Emergency Management (established 2018)	Huang Yuzhi 黄玉治	1960	CCP	2020	March 2023
China Drug Administration 国家药品监督管理局 (established 2018)	State Market Regulatory Administration (established 2018)	Jiao Hong 焦红 (female)	1963	CPWDP (Vice-chairwoman)	2018	March 2023
China National Intellectual Property Administration 国家知识产权局 (directly under the State Council by 2018)	State Market Regulatory Administration (established 2018)	Shen Changyu 申长雨	1963	CCP	2013	March 2023
National Administration for the Protection of State Secrets 国家保密局; Office of the Central Secrecy Commission 中央保密委员会办公室	General Office of the CCP Central Committee	Tian Jing 田静	1960	CCP	2015	
State Cryptography Administration 国家密码管理局; Office of the Central Leading Group for Cryptography Work 中央密码工作领导小组办公室	General Office of the CCP Central Committee	Li Zhaozong 李兆宗		CCP	2016	
State Archives Administration 国家档案局; Central Archives 中央档案馆	General Office of the CCP Central Committee	Li Minghua 李明华	1959	CCP	2015	

=== Interdepartmental coordinating agencies ===
- National Defense Mobilization Commission (NDMC)
- Financial Stability and Development Committee (FSDC) (国务院金融稳定发展委员会), established in 2017

and many more...

=== Agencies dispatched by the State Council ===
Ministry-level

1. Liaison Office of the Central People's Government in the Hong Kong Special Administrative Region (中央人民政府驻香港特别行政区联络办公室), established on 18 January 2000.
2. Liaison Office of the Central People's Government in the Macao Special Administrative Region (中央人民政府驻澳门特别行政区联络办公室), established on 18 January 2000.

Sub-ministry-level

1. Office for Safeguarding National Security of the Central People's Government in the Hong Kong Special Administrative Region (中央人民政府驻香港特别行政区维护国家安全公署), established on 1 July 2020.

== See also ==
- Generations of Chinese leadership
  - Hu–Wen Administration (2002–2012)
  - Xi–Li Administration (2012–2017)
  - General secretaryship of Xi Jinping
