= 13th State Council of China =

Chinese government headed by Premier Li Keqiang

Li Keqiang government 李克强政府
- 13th State Council of China

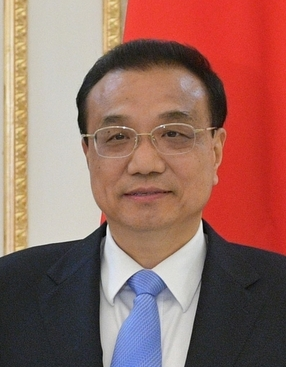
- Li Keqiang in November 2019
- Date formed: 19 March 2018
- Date dissolved: 12 March 2023

People and organisations
- Premier: Li Keqiang
- Vice Premiers: 1st: Han Zheng; 2nd: Sun Chunlan; 3rd: Hu Chunhua; 4th: Liu He
- No. of ministers: 35
- Ministers removed: 16
- Total no. of members: 49
- Member party: Chinese Communist Party; Eight minor parties
- Status in legislature: One-party state

History
- Election: First session of the 13th National People's Congress
- Legislature term: 13th National People's Congress
- Budgets: Income: ¥80,245 billion Expenses: ¥95,745 billion Different: ▼¥15,500 billion
- Predecessor: 12th State Council of China
- Successor: 14th State Council of China

Li Keqiang Government
- Simplified Chinese: 李克强政府
- Traditional Chinese: 李克強政府
Transcriptions
Standard Mandarin
- Hanyu Pinyin: Lǐ Kèqiáng Zhèngfǔ

Li Keqiang Cabinet
- Simplified Chinese: 李克强内阁
- Traditional Chinese: 李克強內閣
Transcriptions
Standard Mandarin
- Hanyu Pinyin: Lǐ Kèqiáng Nèigé

The 13th State Council of China lasted from March 2018 to March 2023, under the Li Keqiang premiership. It succeeded the 12th State Council. Premier Li was ranked only second to CCP general secretary Xi Jinping among 7 members of the 19th Politburo Standing Committee, top decision-making body of the Chinese Communist Party (CCP). During the 1st Session of the 13th National People's Congress in March 2018, Li Keqiang was appointed by President Xi according to the approval of the National People's Congress to re-serve as the Premier.

== 13th State Council ==
=== State Council leaders ===
Members of the Executive Meeting of the 13th State Council (March 2018 – March 2023)
#	Portrait Name	Birth year	Government posts	Duties	Party	Party positions	Functional roles
1	Li Keqiang 李克强	1955	Premier of the State Council	Overall work of the State Council	CCP	Member, 19th Politburo Standing Committee; Secretary, Leading Party Members' Group of the State Council	Vice Chairman, National Security Commission; Director, Central Institutional Organization Commission; Director, National Defense Mobilization Commission; Director, National Energy Commission
2	Han Zheng 韩正	1955	Vice Premier of the State Council (first-ranked)	Develop & reform, institutional reform, etc.	CCP	Member, 19th Politburo Standing Committee; Deputy Secretary, Leading Party Members' Group of the State Council	
3	Sun Chunlan 孙春兰 (female)	1950	Vice Premier of the State Council	Education, health, sport, etc.	CCP	Member, 19th Politburo; Member, Leading Party Members' Group of the State Council	
4	Hu Chunhua 胡春华	1963	Vice Premier of the State Council	Agricultural and rural affairs, poverty alleviation, water resources, foreign trade	CCP	Member, 19th Politburo; Member, Leading Party Members' Group of the State Council	
5	Liu He 刘鹤	1952	Vice Premier of the State Council	Finance, science and technology, industry and transport	CCP	Member, 19th Politburo; Member, Leading Party Members' Group of the State Council	Director of the Central Financial and Economic Affairs Commission Office
6	General; Wei Fenghe 魏凤和	1954	State Councilor and Minister of National Defense; Member of the PRC Central Military Commission	National defense mobilization, etc.	CCP	Member, 19th Central Committee; Member, Leading Party Members' Group of the State Council; Member, CCP Central Military Commission	Member, Central Foreign Affairs Commission; Director
7	Wang Yong 王勇	1955	State Councilor	Emergency management, etc.	CCP	Member, 19th Central Committee; Member, Leading Party Members' Group of the State Council	
8	Wang Yi 王毅	1953	State Councilor and Minister of Foreign Affairs	Foreign affairs	CCP	Member, 19th Central Committee; Member, Leading Party Members' Group of the State Council	Member, Central Foreign Affairs Commission
9	Xiao Jie 肖捷	1957	State Councillor and Secretary-General of the State Council	In charge of the State Council General Office	CCP	Member, 19th Central Committee; Member, Leading Party Members' Group of the State Council; Secretary, Leading Party Members' Group Under the State Council	
10	PCG (Note: Police Commissioner-General); Zhao Kezhi 赵克志	1953	State Councillor and Minister of Public Security	Public security, etc.	CCP	Member, 19th Central Committee; Member, Leading Party Members' Group of the State Council	Member, Central Political and Legal Affairs Commission; Member, Central National Security Commission

=== Cabinet-level departments ===
Constituent Departments of the 13th State Council (March 2018 – March 2023)
#	Logo	Name of Department	Chief	Birth year	Party	Took office	Left office	Reports To
1		Ministry of Foreign Affairs 外交部	Wang Yi 王毅; State Councilor and Minister of Foreign Affairs	1953	CCP	2018	March 2023	Xi Jinping (Party General Secretary and Director of the Central Foreign Affairs Commission) ∟ Yang Jiechi (Director of the CFAC Office)
2		Minister of National Defense 国防部	General Wei Fenghe 魏凤和 (Member of the Central Military Commission); State Councilor and Minister of National Defense	1954	CCP	2018	March 2023	Xi Jinping (Party General Secretary and Chairman of the Central Military Commission)
3		National Development and Reform Commission (NDRC) 国家发展和改革委员会	He Lifeng 何立峰 (Vice-chairman of the CPPCC National Committee); Minister in charge of the National Development and Reform Commission	1955	CCP	2018	March 2023	Vice-Premier Han Zheng
4		Ministry of Education (MOE) 教育部	Chen Baosheng 陈宝生; Minister of Education	1956	CCP	2018	March 2023	Vice-Premier Sun Chunlan
5		Ministry of Science and Technology 科学技术部	Wang Zhigang 王志刚; Minister of Science and Technology	1957	CCP	2018	March 2023	Vice-Premier Liu He
6		Ministry of Industry and Information Technology (MIIT) 工业和信息化部	Miao Wei 苗圩; Minister of Industry and Information Technology	1955	CCP	2018	March 2023	Vice-Premier Liu He
7		National Ethnic Affairs Commission (NEAC) 国家民族事务委员会	Bagaturᠪᠠᠭᠠᠲᠤᠷ 巴特尔 (Mongol) (Vice-chairman of the CPPCC National Committee); Minister in charge of the National Ethnic Affairs Commission	1955	CCP	2018	2020	You Quan (Head of the CCP Central Committee United Front Work Department)
7		National Ethnic Affairs Commission (NEAC) 国家民族事务委员会	Chen Xiaojiang 陈小江; Minister in charge of the National Ethnic Affairs Commission	1962	CCP	2020-12-26	March 2023	You Quan (Head of the CCP Central Committee United Front Work Department)
8		Ministry of Public Security (MPS) 公安部	PCG Zhao Kezhi 赵克志; State Councilor and Minister of Public Security	1953	CCP	2018	March 2023	Guo Shengkun (Secretary of the CCP Central Political and Legal Affairs Commission)
9		Ministry of State Security (MSS) 国家安全部	PCG Chen Wenqing 陈文清; Minister of State Security	1960	CCP	2018		Guo Shengkun (Secretary of the CCP Central Political and Legal Affairs Commission)
10		Ministry of Civil Affairs (MCA) 民政部	Huang Shuxian 黄树贤; Minister of Civil Affairs	1954	CCP	2016	2019-10-26	State Councilor Wang Yong
10		Ministry of Civil Affairs (MCA) 民政部	Li Jiheng 李纪恒; Minister of Civil Affairs	1957	CCP	2019-10-26	March 2023	State Councilor Wang Yong
11		Ministry of Justice 司法部	Fu Zhenghua 傅政华; Minister of Justice	1955	CCP	2018	April 2020	Guo Shengkun (Secretary of the CCP Central Political and Legal Affairs Commission)
11		Ministry of Justice 司法部	Tang Yijun 唐一军; Minister of Justice	1961	CCP	April 2020	March 2023	Guo Shengkun (Secretary of the CCP Central Political and Legal Affairs Commission)
12		Ministry of Finance 财政部	Liu Kun 刘昆; Minister of Finance	1956	CCP	2018	March 2023	Vice-Premier Han Zheng
13		Ministry of Human Resources and Social Security (MOHRSS) 人力资源和社会保障部	Zhang Jinan 张纪南; Ministry of Human Resources and Social Security	1957	CCP	2018	March 2023	Premier Li Keqiang
14		Ministry Natural Resources 自然资源部	Lu Hao 陆昊; Minister of Natural Resources	1967	CCP	2018	March 2023	Vice-Premier Han Zheng
15		Ministry of Ecology and Environment 生态环境部	Li Ganjie 李干杰; Minister of Ecology and Environment	1964	CCP	2018	April 2020	Vice-Premier Han Zheng
15		Ministry of Ecology and Environment 生态环境部	Huang Runqiu 黄润秋; Minister of Ecology and Environment	1963	JS (vice-president)	April 2020	March 2023	Vice-Premier Han Zheng
16		Ministry of Housing and Urban-Rural Development 住房和城乡建设部	Wang Menghui 王蒙徽; Minister of Housing and Urban-Rural Development	1960	CCP	2018	March 2023	Vice-Premier Han Zheng
17		Ministry of Transport (MOT) 交通运输部	Li Xiaopeng 李小鹏; Minister of Transport	1959	CCP	2018	March 2023	Vice-Premier Liu He
18		Ministry of Water Resources 水利部	E Jingping 鄂竟平; Minister of Water Resources	1956	CCP	2018	March 2023	Vice-Premier Hu Chunhua
19		Ministry of Agriculture and Rural Affairs 农业农村部	Han Changfu 韩长赋; Minister of Agriculture and Rural Affairs	1954	CCP	2018	December 2020	Vice-Premier Hu Chunhua
19		Ministry of Agriculture and Rural Affairs 农业农村部	Tang Renjian 唐仁健; Minister of Agriculture and Rural Affairs	1962	CCP	December 2020	March 2023	Vice-Premier Hu Chunhua
20		Ministry of Commerce (MOFCOM) 商务部	Zhong Shan 钟山; Minister of Commerce	1955	CCP	2018	December 2020	Vice-Premier Hu Chunhua
20		Ministry of Commerce (MOFCOM) 商务部	Wang Wentao 王文涛; Minister of Commerce	1964	CCP	December 2020	March 2023	Vice-Premier Hu Chunhua
21		Ministry of Culture and Tourism 文化和旅游部	Luo Shugang 雒树刚; Minister of Culture and Tourism	1955	CCP	2018	March 2023	Huang Kunming (Head of the Publicity Department of the Chinese Communist Party)
21		Ministry of Culture and Tourism 文化和旅游部	Hu Heping 胡和平; Minister of Culture and Tourism	1962	CCP	August 2020	March 2023	Huang Kunming (Head of the Publicity Department of the Chinese Communist Party)
22		National Health Commission 国家卫生健康委员会	Ma Xiaowei 马晓伟; Minister in charge of the National Health Commission	1959	CCP	2018	March 2023	Vice-Premier Sun Chunlan
23		Ministry of Veterans Affairs 退役军人事务部	Sun Shaocheng 孙绍骋; Minister of Veterans Affairs	1960	CCP	2018	March 2023	Vice-Premier Sun Chunlan
24		Ministry of Emergency Management 应急管理部	Wang Yupu 王玉普; Minister of Emergency Management	1956	CCP	March 2018	2020-12-08 (died of cancer)	State Councilor Wang Yong
24		Ministry of Emergency Management 应急管理部	Huang Ming 黄明; Minister of Emergency Management	1957	CCP	April 2021	March 2023	State Councilor Wang Yong
25		People's Bank of China (PBC) 中国人民银行	Yi Gang 易纲; Governor of the People's Bank of China	1958	CCP	2018	March 2023	Vice-Premier Liu He (Director of the Central Financial and Economic Affairs Commission Office)
26		National Audit Office 审计署	Hu Zejun 胡泽君 (female); Auditor-General of the National Audit Office	1955	CCP	2018	March 2023	Premier Li Keqiang ∟ Vice-Premier Han Zheng

== Other ministry-level and sub-ministry-level agencies ==
=== Special organization directly under the State Council ===
Ministry-level

Logo	Agency	Chief	Birth year	Party	Took office	Left office
	State-owned Assets Supervision and Administration Commission of the State Council 国务院国有资产监督管理委员会	Xiao Yaqing 肖亚庆	1959	CCP	March 2018	March 2023

=== Organizations directly under the State Council ===
Ministry-level

Agency	Chief	Birth year	Party	Took office	Left office
General Administration of Customs of the People's Republic of China 中华人民共和国海关总署	CCG (Note: Customs Commissioner-General) Ni Yuefeng 倪岳峰	1964	CCP	2018	March 2023
State Administration of Taxation 国家税务总局	Wang Jun 王军	1958	CCP	2018	March 2023
State Administration for Market Regulation (SAMR) 国家市场监督管理总局	Zhang Mao 张茅	1954	CCP	2018	March 2023
State Administration of Radio and Television (SART) 国家广播电视总局	Nie Chenxi 聂辰席	1957	CCP	2018	March 2023
State General Administration of Sports 国家体育总局	Gou Zhongwen 苟仲文	1957	CCP	2018	
Counselor's Office of the State Council 国务院参事室	Wang Zhongwei 王仲伟	1955	CCP	2015	

Sub-ministry-level

Agency	Chief	Birth year	Party	Took office	Left office
National Bureau of Statistics of the People's Republic of China 中华人民共和国国家统计局	Ning Jizhe 宁吉喆	1956	CCP	2018	March 2023
China International Development Cooperation Agency 国家国际发展合作署	Wang Xiaotao 王晓涛	1960	CCP	2018	March 2023
State Administration of Medical Insurance 国家医疗保障局	Hu Jinglin 胡静林	1964	CCP	2018	March 2023
State Intellectual Property Office of the People's Republic of China 中华人民共和国国家知识产权局 under the State Market Regulatory Administration from 2018	Shen Changyu 申长雨	1963	CCP	2013	March 2023
State Administration for Religious Affairs 国家宗教事务局 absorbed into the United Front Work Department of the CCP Central Committee from 2018	Wang Zuoan 王作安	1958	CCP	2009	
National Government Offices Administration 国家机关事务管理局	Li Baorong 李宝荣	1958	CCP	2015	

=== Administrative Offices under the State Council ===
Ministry-level

Agency	Chief	Birth year	Party	Took office	Left office
Hong Kong and Macao Affairs Office of the State Council 国务院港澳事务办公室	Zhang Xiaoming 张晓明	1963	CCP	2017	March 2023
State Council Research Office 国务院研究室	Huang Shouhong 黄守宏	1964	CCP	2016	March 2023
Overseas Chinese Affairs Office of the State Council 国务院侨务办公室 absorbed into the United Front Work Department of the CCP Central Committee from 2018	Xu Yousheng 许又声	1957	CCP	2018	March 2023
Taiwan Affairs Office of the State Council 国务院台湾事务办公室; Taiwan Work Office of the CCP Central Committee 中共中央台湾工作办公室	Liu Jieyi 刘结一	1957	CCP	2018	March 2023
State Council Information Office 国务院新闻办公室; Foreign Publicity Office of the CCP Central Committee 中共中央对外宣传办公室	Jiang Jianguo 蒋建国	1956	CCP	2013	March 2023
Cyberspace Administration of China 国家互联网信息办公室; Office of the Central Cyberspace Affairs Commission 中央网络安全和信息化委员会办公室	Xu Lin 徐麟	1963	CCP	2016	March 2023

=== Institutions directly under the State Council ===
Ministry-level

Agency	Chief	Birth year	Party	Took office	Left office
Xinhua News Agency 新华通讯社	Cai Mingzhao 蔡名照	1955	CCP	2014	March 2023
Chinese Academy of Sciences (CAS) 中国科学院	Bai Chunli 白春礼	1953	CCP	2011	March 2023
Chinese Academy of Social Sciences (CASS) 中国社会科学院	Xie Fuzhan 谢伏瞻	1954	CCP	2018	March 2023
Chinese Academy of Engineering (CAE) 中国工程院	Li Xiaohong 李晓红	1959	CCP	2018	March 2023
Development Research Center of the State Council 国务院发展研究中心	Li Wei 李伟	1953	CCP	2011	March 2023
China Media Group (CMG or Voice of China) 中央广播电视总台	Shen Haixiong 慎海雄	1967	CCP	2018	March 2023
China Banking and Insurance Regulatory Commission (CBIRC) 中国银行保险监督管理委员会	Guo Shuqing 郭树清	1956	CCP	2018	March 2023
China Securities Regulatory Commission (CSRC) 中国证券监督管理委员会	Liu Shiyu 刘士余	1961	CCP	2016	March 2023
National Council for Social Security Fund 全国社会保障基金理事会 under the Ministry of Finance from 2018	Lou Jiwei 楼继伟	1950	CCP	2016	March 2023
National Natural Science Foundation 国家自然科学基金委员会 under the Ministry of Science and Technology from 2018	Li Jinghai 李静海	1956	CCP	2018	March 2023

Sub-ministry-level

Logo	Agency	Chief	Birth year	Party	Took office	Left office
	China Meteorological Administration 中国气象局	Liu Yaming 刘雅鸣 (female)	1957	CCP	2016	March 2023
	China Earthquake Administration 中国地震局 under the Ministry of Emergency Management from 2018	Zheng Guoguang 郑国光	1959	CCP	2016	March 2023

=== National Administrations administered by ministry-level agencies ===
Sub-ministry-level

Agency	Ministered by	Chief	Birth year	Party	Took office	Left office
State Bureau for Letters and Calls 国家信访局	State Council General Office	Shu Xiaoqin 舒晓琴 (female)	1956	CCP	2013	March 2023
State Administration of Grain and Reserves 国家粮食和物资储备局	National Development and Reform Commission	Zhang Wufeng 张务锋	1960	CCP	2018	March 2023
National Energy Administration 国家能源局	National Development and Reform Commission	Nur Bekri 努尔·白克力 نۇر بەكرى	1961	CCP	2014	March 2023
State Administration of Science, Technology and Industry for National Defence 国家国防科技工业局	Ministry of Industry and Information Technology	Zhang Kejian 张克俭	1961	CCP	2018	March 2023
State Tobacco Monopoly Administration 国家烟草专卖局	Ministry of Industry and Information Technology	Zhang Jianmin 张建民	1964	CCP	2018	March 2023
State Immigration Administration 国家移民管理局; Entry-Exit Administration of the People's Republic of China 中华人民共和国出入境管理局	Ministry of Public Security	Xu Ganlu 许甘露	1962	CCP	2018	March 2023
State Forestry and Grassland Administration 国家林业和草原局; State Administration For National Parks 国家公园管理局	Ministry of Natural Resources	Zhang Jianlong 张建龙	1957	CCP	2018	March 2023
State Administration of Foreign Experts Affairs 国家外国专家局 absorbed into the Ministry of Science and Technology from 2018	Ministry of Human Resources and Social Security	Zhang Jianguo 张建国	1957	CCP	2011	
State Bureau of Civil Servants 国家公务员局 absorbed into the Organization Department of the CCP Central Committee from 2018	Ministry of Human Resources and Social Security	Fu Xingguo 傅兴国	1960	CCP	2016	
Civil Aviation Administration of China 中国民用航空局	Ministry of Transport	Feng Zhenglin 冯正霖	1957	CCP	2015	
National Railway Administration 国家铁路局	Ministry of Transport	Yang Yudong 杨宇栋	1968	CCP	2016	
State Post Bureau 国家邮政局	Ministry of Transport	Ma Junsheng 马军胜	1961	CCP	2006	
State Administration of Cultural Heritage 国家文物局	Ministry of Culture (abolished 2018); Ministry of Culture and Tourism (established 2018)	Liu Yuzhu 刘玉珠	1957	CCP	2015	
State Administration of Traditional Chinese Medicine 国家中医药管理局	National Health Commission	Yu Wenming 于文明	1963	CPWDP (Vice-chairman)	2018	March 2023
National Bureau of Disease Control and Prevention 国家疾病预防控制局	National Health Commission	Wang Hesheng 王贺胜	1961	CCP	2021	March 2023
State Administration of Foreign Exchange 国家外汇管理局	People's Bank of China	Pan Gongsheng 潘功胜	1963	CCP	2018	March 2023
State Administration of Coal Mine Safety 国家煤矿安全监察局 (abolished 2020)	State Administration of Work Safety (abolished 2018)	Huang Yuzhi 黄玉治	1960	CCP	2014	2020
State Administration of Coal Mine Safety 国家煤矿安全监察局 (abolished 2020)	Ministry of Emergency Management (established 2018)	Huang Yuzhi 黄玉治	1960	CCP	2014	2020
National Mine Safety Administration 国家矿山安全监察局 (established 2020)	Ministry of Emergency Management (established 2018)	Huang Yuzhi 黄玉治	1960	CCP	2020	March 2023
China Drug Administration 国家药品监督管理局 (established 2018)	State Market Regulatory Administration (established 2018)	Jiao Hong 焦红 (female)	1963	CPWDP (Vice-chairwoman)	2018	March 2023
China National Intellectual Property Administration 国家知识产权局 (directly under the State Council by 2018)	State Market Regulatory Administration (established 2018)	Shen Changyu 申长雨	1963	CCP	2013	March 2023
National Administration for the Protection of State Secrets 国家保密局; Office of the Central Secrecy Commission 中央保密委员会办公室	General Office of the CCP Central Committee	Tian Jing 田静	1960	CCP	2015	
State Cryptography Administration 国家密码管理局; Office of the Central Leading Group for Cryptography Work 中央密码工作领导小组办公室	General Office of the CCP Central Committee	Li Zhaozong 李兆宗		CCP	2016	
State Archives Administration 国家档案局; Central Archives 中央档案馆	General Office of the CCP Central Committee	Li Minghua 李明华	1959	CCP	2015	

=== Interdepartmental coordinating agencies ===
- National Defense Mobilization Commission (NDMC)
- Financial Stability and Development Committee (FSDC) (国务院金融稳定发展委员会), established in 2017

and many more...

=== Agencies dispatched by the State Council ===
Ministry-level

1. Liaison Office of the Central People's Government in the Hong Kong Special Administrative Region (中央人民政府驻香港特别行政区联络办公室), established on 18 January 2000.
2. Liaison Office of the Central People's Government in the Macao Special Administrative Region (中央人民政府驻澳门特别行政区联络办公室), established on 18 January 2000.

Sub-ministry-level

1. Office for Safeguarding National Security of the Central People's Government in the Hong Kong Special Administrative Region (中央人民政府驻香港特别行政区维护国家安全公署), established on 1 July 2020.

== See also ==
- Generations of Chinese leadership
  - Hu–Wen Administration (2002–2012)
  - Xi–Li Administration (2012–2017)
  - General secretaryship of Xi Jinping
