= Classified information in China =

In the People's Republic of China, a system of state secrets (Chinese: 国家机密; pinyin: guójiā jīmì) governs classified information. While only the government can formally classify materials, sensitive matters of the Chinese Communist Party (CCP) are also protected. State secrets are divided into three main categories (in descending order of sensitivity): Top Secret, Highly Secret, and Secret. Each label confers distinct handling and access control requirements consistent with the level of sensitivity. The practices of state secrecy are enforced by the National Administration of State Secrets Protection / CCP Central Secrecy Commission and governed primarily by the Law on the Protection of State Secrets. A 2024 revision of the law codified an additional broad classification category called "work secret." While the legislation offers a robust framework for classification management, some question the authority of China's formal classification policy, arguing that the party-state often applies classification arbitrarily as an ad-hoc tool to suppress politically inconvenient information.

== Classification levels ==
- Top Secret (绝密, Juémì) – defined as "vital state secrets whose disclosure would cause extremely serious harm to state security and national interests"
- Highly Secret (机密, Jīmì) – defined as "important state secrets whose disclosure would cause serious harm to state security and national interests"
- Secret (秘密, Mìmì) – defined as "ordinary state secrets whose disclosure would cause harm to state security and national interests"

=== Work Secret ===
Work Secret (工作秘密, Gōngzuò Mìmì) is a category of classification distinguishing information that is not an official state secret, but "will cause certain adverse effects if leaked." Introduced in 2024, it may be analogous to a "sensitive but unclassified" designation, but with expansive, poorly defined authorities. International law firm WilmerHale describes the new law as "not clear" and "vulnerable to being subject to arbitrary, inconsistent or expansive interpretation". According to The New York Times, it makes the definition of state secret "so broad that it could include anything that the party-state decides it should." Ryan Mitchell of the University of Hong Kong Law School told Reuters the change was likely intended to cover information regarding the organizational structure and decision-making hierarchy of state institutions.

== Legal definitions ==
Article 13 of the Law on the Protection of State Secrets (2024) describes state secrets as:

1. Secret matters in major decision-making on state affairs.
2. Secret matters in national defense construction and armed forces activities.
3. Secret matters in diplomacy and foreign affairs activities, as well as secret matters that are subject to external confidentiality obligations.
4. Secret matters in national economic and social development.
5. Secret matters in science and technology.
6. Secret matters in activities for preserving national security and the investigation of crimes.
7. Other secret matters as designated by the state secrecy administration department.

Matters of the Communist Party that meet these categories are also state secrets under Article 13.

=== Original classification authorities ===
- Organs of the national government and provincial governments, and their designees, are authorized to classify information up to the top secret level.
- District or city governments and their designees are authorized to classify information up to the secret level.
- The Ministry of State Security (MSS) and Ministry of Public Security (MPS) have authority to determine the classification level of any information.

=== Declassification timelines ===
By default, the classification period for state secrets is 30 years for top secret information, 20 years for secret information, and 10 years for confidential information, after which each is supposed to be reviewed for declassification.

== Criminal offenses ==
Article 28 of the Law on the Protection of State Secrets (2024) proscribes the following as criminal offenses under the Criminal Law of the People's Republic of China:

1. Illegally obtaining or possessing state secret media.
2. Buying, selling, transferring, or privately destroying state secret media.
3. Delivering state secret media through ordinary postal service, courier service, or other channels without secrecy measures.
4. Sending or transporting state secrets media out of the mainland.
5. Carrying or transmitting state secrets media out of the mainland without the approval of the relevant departments in charge.
6. Other conduct that violates secrecy provisions for state secret media.

== History ==
Classification legislation in China began with the Interim Regulations on the Protection of State Secrets, approved by Chairman Mao Zedong on June 7, 1951. The interim regulation was abolished on September 5, 1988, replaced by the new Law on Guarding State Secrets, which was finalized by President Yang Shangkun through Presidential Decree No. 6. The law was amended 25 years later, when the Standing Committee of the 11th National People's Congress introduced revisions which went into force October 1, 2010. The current version of the law was introduced by the Standing Committee of the 14th National People's Congress on February 27, 2024, as the law's second revision. It was adopted and went into effect May 1, 2024.

== See also ==
- Neican
