= Xu Ying (politician, born 1964) =

Chinese politician

- 徐㼆

Deputy Director of the State Tobacco Monopoly Administration
- In office March 2014 – May 2024
- Director: Ling Chengxing; Zhang Jianmin

Personal details
- Born: October 1964 (age 61) China
- Party: Chinese Communist Party (expelled in 2024)

Xu Ying (Chinese: 徐㼆; pinyin: Xú Yíng; born October 1964) is a former Chinese politician who served as deputy director of the State Tobacco Monopoly Administration from 2014 to 2024. He was investigated by China's top anti-graft agency in May 2024.

== Career ==
Xu was born in October 1964.

Beginning in July 1988, Xu served in several posts in the State Tobacco Monopoly Administration, including official of the Office, staff member of the Policy and Regulations Department, deputy director of the Comprehensive Division of the Policy and Regulations Department, deputy director and director of the Institutional Reform Division of the Policy and Regulations Department, and deputy director of Policy, Regulations and System Reform Department.

Xu was deputy general manager of Yunnan Tobacco Industry Company in January 2004, in addition to serving as chairman of Hongyun Group.

In October 2007, Xu was appointed as chairman of the branches of Zhejiang, Hubei, Hunan and Guangdong of China Tobacco. In August of the following year, he concurrently served as chairman of the Guangxi branch. He also served as director of the Working Office of the Board of Directors of the Provincial Industrial Company of the State Tobacco Monopoly Administration since April 2009.

Xu was party branch secretary, director, and general manager of Jiangxi Provincial Tobacco Monopoly Bureau in June 2010 and subsequently party branch secretary, director, and general manager of Beijing Municipal Tobacco Monopoly Bureau in July 2012.

In March 2014, Xu was promoted to deputy director of the State Tobacco Monopoly Administration, responsible for the Development Planning Department, Financial Management and Supervision Department (Audit Department), Office of the Leading Group for Electronic Cigarette Supervision and Management, Tobacco Economic Information Center, China Tobacco Leaf Company, China Cigarette Sales Company, and China Tobacco Business Logistics Co., Ltd..

== Downfall ==
On 25 May 2024, Xu was put under investigation for alleged "serious violations of discipline and laws" by the Central Commission for Discipline Inspection (CCDI), the party's internal disciplinary body, and the National Supervisory Commission, the highest anti-corruption agency of China. Xu is the fifth senior official in the tobacco system to be targeted since the 18th National Congress of the Chinese Communist Party's anti-corruption campaign. The other four are: Zhao Hongshun, Pan Jiahua (潘家华), He Zehua, and Ling Chengxing. On November 20, he was stripped of his posts within the CCP and in the public office. On December 6, he was arrested by the Supreme People's Procuratorate.

On 16 March 2025, Xu was indicted on suspicion of accepting bribes. On August 12, he was sentenced to 15 years in prison for accepting bribes and fined a sum of 5 million yuan (about 700,104 U.S. dollars) by the Anyang Intermediate People's Court in Henan province.
