= China National =

China National may refer to:

- China National Heavy Duty Truck Group, a truck manufacturing state-owned enterprise in People's Republic of China
- China National Petroleum Corporation, a state-owned oil and gas corporation
- China National Tobacco Corporation, a state-owned manufacturer of tobacco products
