= Han Zhanwu =

Chinese politician (born 1966)

- 韩占武

Deputy Director of the State Tobacco Monopoly Administration
- In office April 2020 – 12 October 2025

Personal details
- Born: October 1966 (age 59)
- Party: Chinese Communist Party (expelled in 2026)

Han Zhanwu (Chinese: 韩占武; born October 1966) is a former Chinese politician, who served as the deputy director of the State Tobacco Monopoly Administration from 2020 to 2025.

== Career ==
Han was appointed as the deputy director of the personnel department of the State Development Planning Commission, Division of Affiliated Units in 2000, and he was moved to general affairs department in 2006. In 2008, he was moved to the personnel and education department of the Ministry of Industry and Information Technology.

In 2010, Han was appointed as the director of China Machinery and Equipment Bidding Center. He returned to the personnel and education department of the MIIT in 2016, as a director. In 2019, Han was appointed as the director of the general office and deputy secretary of the Party Committee of the MIIT.

In April 2020, Han was appointed as the deputy director of the State Tobacco Monopoly Administration.

== Investigation ==
On 12 October 2025, Han was put under investigation for alleged "serious violations of discipline and laws" by the Central Commission for Discipline Inspection (CCDI), the party's internal disciplinary body, and the National Supervisory Commission, the highest anti-corruption agency of China. Han was expelled from the party and dismissed from the public offices on 13 April 2026.
