= Gold Wall Press =

State-owned publishing house in China

Gold Wall Press (Chinese: 金城出版社) is a publishing house in Beijing, China. It is sponsored by the National Administration of State Secrets Protection and was established in June 1989 in Beijing. It publishes materials related to national security and translations of works related to secrets.

== See also ==
- Publishing industry in China
