= Xu Ying =

Xu Ying, may refer to:

- Xu Ying (librettist), Chinese librettist.
- Xu Ying (politician, born 1964), Chinese politician, deputy director of the State Tobacco Monopoly Administration from 2014 to 2024.
- Xu Ying (politician, born 1967), Chinese politician, Standing Member of the CCP Jiangsu Provincial Committee.
