= Zhao Chongjiu =

Chinese politician (born 1965)

- 赵冲久

Director-General of the State Post Bureau
- Incumbent
- Assumed office 29 September 2022
- Preceded by: Ma Junsheng

Personal details
- Born: May 1965 (age 61) Panshan County, Liaoning, China
- Party: Chinese Communist Party
- Education: Tianjin University

Chinese name
- Simplified Chinese: 赵冲久
- Traditional Chinese: 趙衝久
Transcriptions
Standard Mandarin
- Hanyu Pinyin: Zhào Chōngjiǔ

Zhao Chongjiu (Chinese: 赵冲久; born May 1965) is a Chinese politician who is party branch secretary of the State Post Bureau, in office since September 2022.

== Biography ==
Zhao was born in Panshan County (now Panjin), Liaoning, in May 1965. In 1983, he entered Tianjin University, majoring in port and waterway engineering.

He joined the Chinese Communist Party (CCP) in June 1986. After graduating in 1990, he was despatched to the Tianjin Water Transport Engineering Research Institute, Ministry of Communications, where he moved up the ranks to become deputy director in November 1997 and director in November 1999. He was party secretary and vice president of China Communications Press in August 2009, and held that office until October 2011. He was assigned to the Ministry of Transport in October 2011 and worked successively as director of the Science and Technology Department (2011–2014), chief engineer (2014–2016), and director of Integrated Planning Department (2016–2017).

In February 2017, he was transferred to northwest China's Xinjiang Uygur Autonomous Region and appointed vice chairman, a position he held until May 2021.

He was appointed vice minister of transport in June 2021, concurrently serving as director of China Maritime Search and Rescue Center.

On 2 September 2022, he was appointed party branch secretary of the State Post Bureau, succeeding Ma Junsheng.

Government offices
Preceded by Ma Junsheng	Director-General of the State Post Bureau; 2022–present	Incumbent
