= Second Historical Archives of China =

National archive in Nanjing, Jiangsu, China

The Second Historical Archives of China
- 中国第二历史档案馆

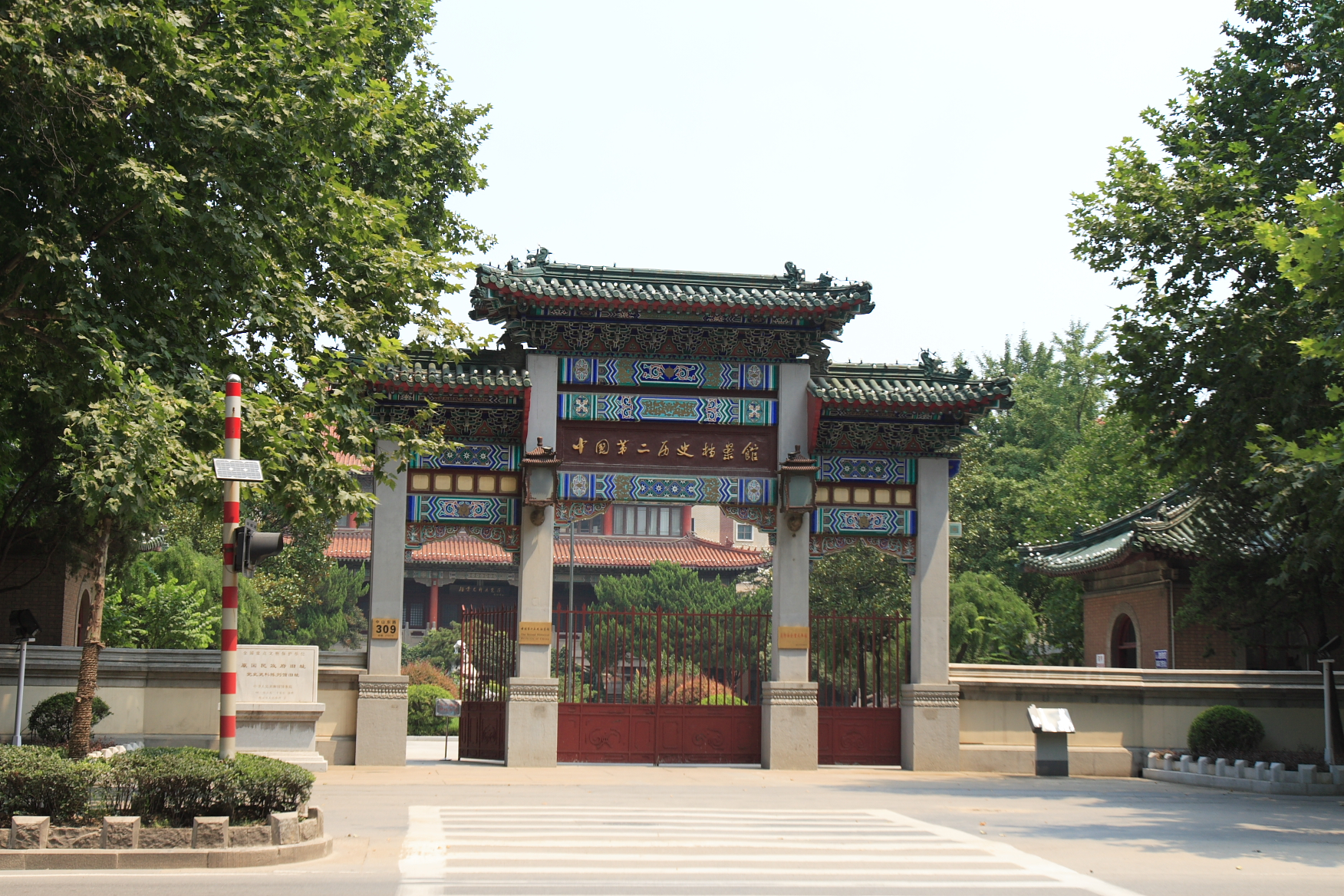
- Interactive map of The Second Historical Archives of China
- 32°02′32″N 118°48′32″E
- Location: 309 Zhongshan E Rd, Xuanwu, Nanjing, Jiangsu, China
- Established: February 1951
- Website: shac.net.cn

The Second Historical Archives of China (SHAC; 中国第二历史档案馆) is a central-level national archive located in Nanjing, Jiangsu, under the National Archives Administration of China. Established in February 1951, it is responsible for collecting and managing archives of central government agencies during the Republic of China period, from 1912 to 1949.

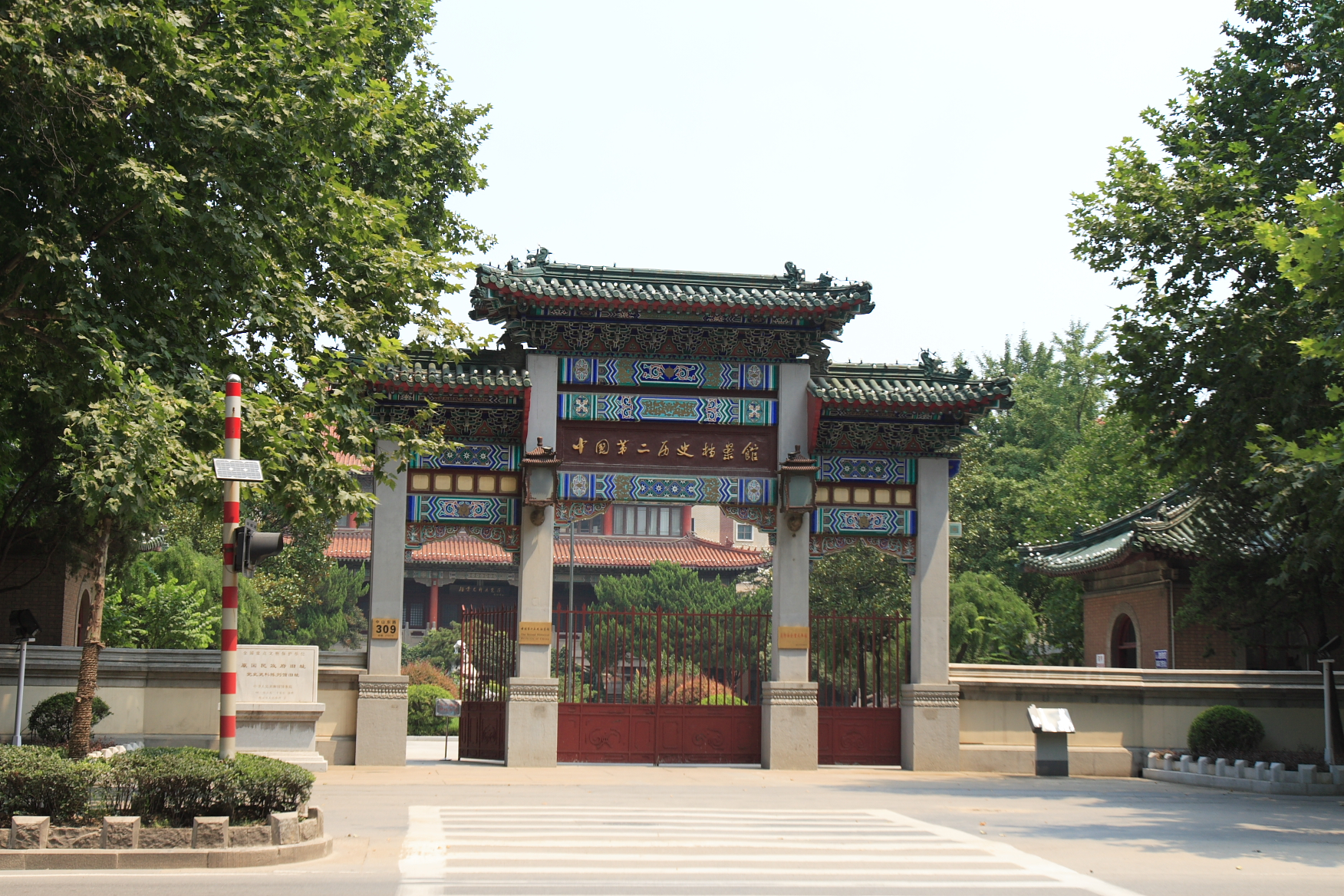
The Second Historical Archives of China

As of 2024, the archive held more than 2.58 million volumes, with shelves more than 50 thousand meters long cumulatively. The archive cover major historical events and figures in various historical stages of the Republic of China, including archives of the Nanjing Provisional Government, the Guangzhou and Wuhan Nationalist Governments, the Beijing Government of the Republic of China, the Nanjing Nationalist Government, and the Wang Jingwei regime.

The Second Historical Archives of China is in contrast to the First Historical Archives of China, which is responsible for collecting and managing archives formed by central government institutions during the Ming and Qing dynasties and earlier dynasties.

On 9 June 2017, the Second Historical Archives of China opened to the public for the first time.
