= Meng Xiangfeng =

Chinese politician (born 1964)

- 孟祥锋
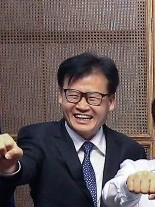

Executive Deputy Director of the General Office of the Chinese Communist Party
- Incumbent
- Assumed office October 2020
- Director: Ding Xuexiang; Cai Qi
- Preceded by: Ding Xuexiang

Personal details
- Born: 17 December 1964 (age 61) Pingxiang County, Henan, China
- Party: Chinese Communist Party
- Education: Jilin University; Central Party School of the Chinese Communist Party

Chinese name
- Simplified Chinese: 孟祥锋
- Traditional Chinese: 孟祥鋒
Transcriptions
Standard Mandarin
- Hanyu Pinyin: Mèng Xiángfēng

Meng Xiangfeng (Note: Chinese: 孟祥锋; pinyin: Mèng Xiángfēng) (born 17 December 1964) is a Chinese politician who is currently the executive deputy director of the General Office of the Chinese Communist Party.

He is a representative of the 19th and 20th National Congress of the Chinese Communist Party and a member of the 19th and 20th Central Committee of the Chinese Communist Party.

== Biography ==
Meng was born in Pingxiang County, Henan, on 17 December 1964.

He entered the workforce in August 1986, and joined the Chinese Communist Party (CCP) in January 1986. He worked in the Central Commission for Discipline Inspection (CCDI) for a long time. He was promoted to be deputy secretary of Liaoning Provincial Commission for Discipline Inspection in May 2008, concurrently serving as head of the Liaoning Provincial Supervision Department since November 2011. In March 2013, he was appointed director of the National Administration for the Protection of State Secrets and director of the Research Office of General Office of the Chinese Communist Party, but having held the position for only two years. In April 2017, he was promoted to become executive deputy secretary of the Work Committee of Departments under the Central Committee, a position he held until March 2018, when he was made executive deputy secretary of the Working Committee of the Central Committee and State Organs of the Central Committee of the Chinese Communist Party. In October 2020, he took office as executive deputy director of the General Office of the Chinese Communist Party.

== Notes ==
Government offices
| Preceded by Cheng Gang (成刚) | Director of Liaoning Provincial Supervision Department; 2011–2013 | Succeeded by Wang Yue (王悦) |
| Preceded by Xia Yong (夏勇) | Director of the National Administration for the Protection of State Secrets; 2013–2015 | Succeeded by Tian Jing (田静) |
Party political offices
| Preceded by Zhang Jianping (张建平) | Executive Deputy Secretary of the Work Committee for Departments Directly Under the Central Committee; 2017–2018 | Succeeded by Himself as Executive Deputy Secretary of the Central Party and State Organs Working Committee |
| Preceded by Himself as Executive Deputy Secretary of the Work Committee for Departments Directly Under the Central Committee | Executive Deputy Secretary of the Central Party and State Organs Working Committee; 2018–2020 | Succeeded by Liang Yanshun |
| Preceded by Li Zhiyong as Executive Deputy Secretary of the State Organs Work Committee of the Central Committee | Executive Deputy Secretary of the Central Party and State Organs Working Committee; 2018–2020 | Succeeded by Liang Yanshun |
| Preceded by Ding Xuexiang | Executive Deputy Director of the General Office of the Chinese Communist Party; 2020–present | Incumbent |
