= First Historical Archives of China =

National archive in Dongcheng, Beijing, China

The First Historical Archives of China
- 中国第一历史档案馆
- Established: 1925
- Location: 9 Qi'nian St, Dongcheng, Beijing, China
- Owner: National Archives Administration of China
- Public transit access: Tian'anmenxi station, Beijing Subway
- Website: fhac.com.cn

The First Historical Archives of China (FHAC; 中国第一历史档案馆) is a central-level national archive located in Dongcheng, Beijing, under the National Archives Administration of China. Originally established in 1925, it is responsible for collecting and managing archives of central government agencies during the Ming and Qing dynasties and earlier dynasties. It holds about 10 million historical documents.

The First Historical Archives of China is in contrast to the Second Historical Archives of China, which is responsible for collecting and managing archives of central government agencies during the Republic of China period, from 1912 to 1949.

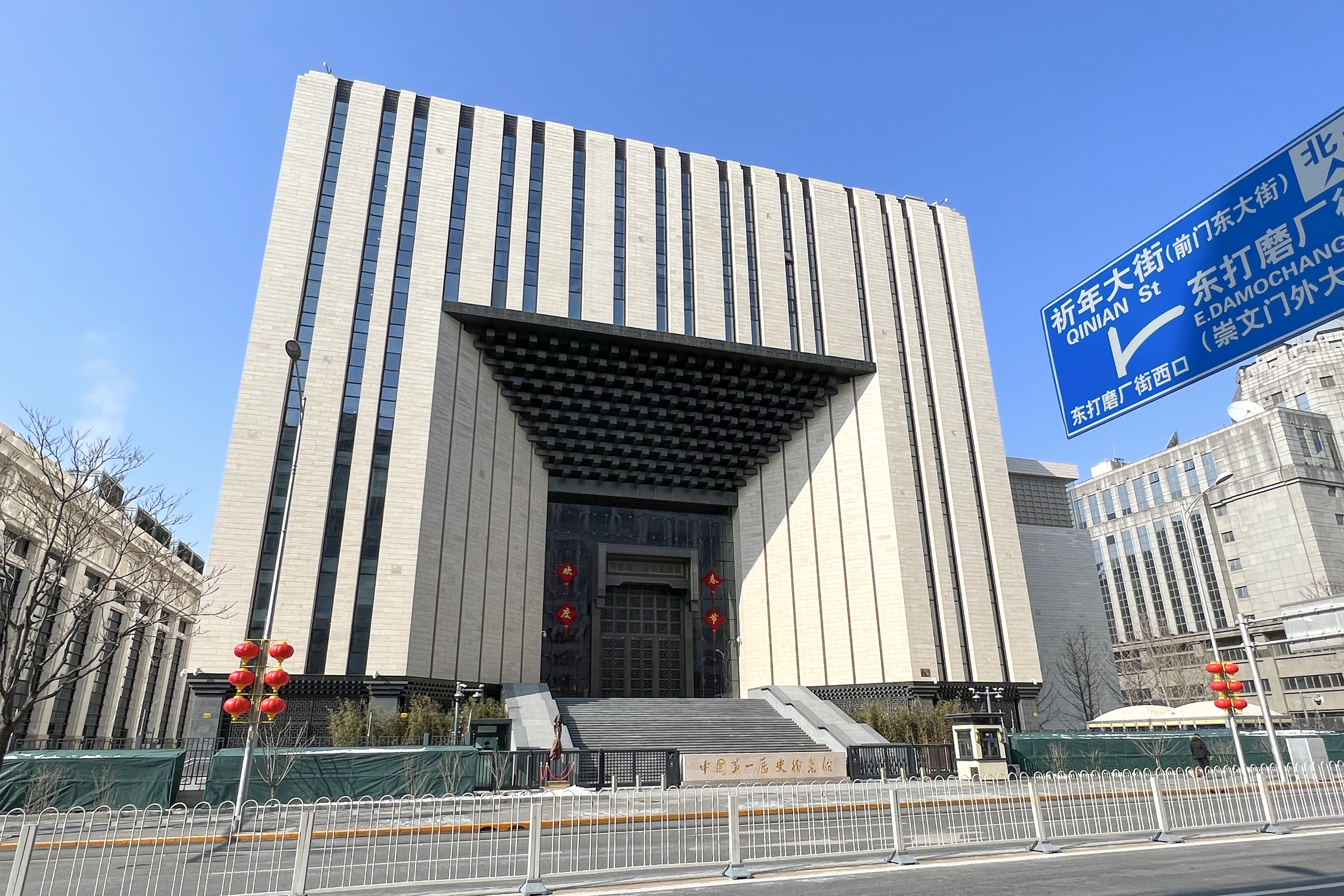
Headquarters of the FHAC

== History ==
On October 10, 1925, the Palace Museum was established in Beijing, with its Library Department responsible for historical documents of the Ming and Qing Dynasties.

After the Communist takeover in 1949, the historical documents of the Palace Museum were placed under the control of the National Archives Administration of China and became part of the Central Archives in 1955. The archives was renamed as the First Historical Archive of China.

By the 1980s, the First Historical Archives became the first in China to fully sort and create preliminary catalogs for the collection. Around 1980, historical archives in China began allowing foreign researchers access. That year, the first group of American researchers was granted access to the First Historical Archives for long-term study.

The First Archives have also worked on digitizing their archival materials since 2006.

The old building of the archives is located within the Palace Museum in Beijing. In 2021, a new building was constructed at No. 9 Qinian Street, Dongcheng District, Beijing. The new facility was completed and opened to the public on July 6, 2022.

The Archives also created a new emblem in 2021. The new emblem, which integrates the Chinese characters “史” (history) and “宬” (ancient archives), symbolizes the preservation, inheritance, and imprinting of history, resembling the form of traditional Chinese seals.

The Archives now holds a total of 77 collections of Ming and Qing archives. As of now, 44 of these collections are available for online catalog searches.

== Open hours ==
Monday to Friday: 8:30 a.m. – 4:30 p.m. Entry stops at 4:00 p.m., and the facility closes at 4:30 p.m.

Saturday: 9:00 a.m. – 5:00 p.m. Entry stops at 4:30 p.m., and the facility closes at 5:00 p.m.

Closed on Sundays and national public holidays.

== Collections ==
The First Historical Archives of China holds about 10 million Ming and Qing historical documents, with the majority being Qing dynasty records, and they consist of nearly half of the estimated 20 million historical files stored across mainland China. Among the collection, about 80% are in Chinese, 20% in Manchu, and over 50,000 in Mongolian. There are also a small number of documents in other minority languages, as well as records in foreign languages such as English, French, German, Russian, and Japanese.

The First Archives is open to international researchers. Most of the collection is accessible to both Chinese and foreign scholars, with only a few exceptions—related to borders, nationalities, and medicinal prescriptions—remaining restricted.
