= Zhuangzi yi =

Ming commentary on Zhuangzi

Zhuangzi yi (simplified Chinese: 庄子翼; traditional Chinese: 莊子翼; pinyin: Zhuāngzǐ yì; Wade–Giles: Chuang-tzu i "Wings to the Zhuangzi") is a work by the Ming philosopher and scholar Jiao Hong 焦竑 (1541–1620).

== Introduction ==
The work, comprising 10 juan and dating from the year 1588, represents the most important interpretative Zhuangzi study of the Ming period; it includes the commentaries of 22 Song and Ming scholars.

The article "Zhuangzi yi" in the Zhongguo zhexue da cidian (Dictionary of Chinese Philosophy) summarizes that the first part discusses the works listed in earlier catalogues, from the commentary of Guo Xiang 郭象 to the writings of 22 other scholars. The second part quotes the so-called mutual explanations (互相发明), from Zhi Daolin (支道林) up to 16 other scholars. In addition, explanations of sections and words (zhangju yinyi 章句音义) are presented, from Guo Xiang up to a total of 11 scholars. Upon examination of the cited sources, it is found that the opinions of Guo Xiang 郭象, Lü Huiqing 吕惠卿, Chu Boxiu 褚伯秀, Luo Mianxue 罗勉学 and Lu Xixing 陆西星 are used most often; the remaining scholars only appear occasionally, to complement the number of sources represented.

Chinaknowledge underlines that Jiao Hong argued in his Zhuangzi yi that the Inner Chapters (neipian) of the Zhuangzi were quite probably written by one person, but the Outer (waipian) and Miscellaneous Chapters (zapian) were additions of later times, especially the Han period.

Guan Feng 关锋 in his translation and commentary of the Inner Chapters of the Zhuangzi (in his Zhuangzi neipian yijie he pipan 庄子内篇译解和批判) concludes his remarks on the work with the following words

采集广博.亦较义海精粹, 可谓集宋、明注庄之大成; 而其筆乘亦多有发明.

The collection is extremely extensive. Compared with the Yihai 义海 [by Chu Boxiu] it is especially precise and concentrated and can be called the great compendium of Song- and Ming-annotations on the Zhuangzi. At the same time the editors' notes contain many original insights and explanations.

Jiao Hong added his own commentary as well, according to Brook Ziporyn "reflecting a learned and syncretic perspective on the text combining Buddhist, Daoist, and Confucian ideas".

The work includes at the end also a volume Zhuangzi quewu 庄子阙误 ("Errors in the Zhuangzi") as well as an appendix in 1 juan. An edition exists, among others, in the Jinling congshu 金陵丛书.

The work is contained in the Daoist Canon (Zhengtong Daozang 正統道藏).

== Works cited (in selection) ==
- Chu Boxiu 褚伯秀, Nanhua zhenjing yihai zuanwei 南华真经义海纂微 (Zhuangzi yihai zuanwei)
- Luo Miandao 罗勉道, Nanhua zhenjing xunben 南华真经循本
- Liu Xuxi 刘须溪, Pingdian Zhuangzi 评点庄子
- Tang Shunzhi 唐顺之, Jingchuan shilüe 荆川释略
- Lu Changgeng 陆长庚, Nanhua fumo 南华副墨
- Zhu Dezhi 朱得之, Zhuangzi tongyi 庄子通义
- Zhang Xueshi 张学士, Buzhu 补注
- Yang Sishan 杨思善, Zhuangyi yaoshan 庄义要删

== Miscellaneous ==
Jiao Hong is also the author of a Laozi yi (Chinese: 老子翼; Wade–Giles: Lao-tzŭ i), in 8 juan, being combined notes on the Daodejing.

== See also ==
- Glossary of Zhuangzi exegesis
- Zhuangzi yi 庄子义, interpretation of the Zhuangzi by Lü Huiqing 吕惠卿

== Bibliography ==
- "Zhuangzi yi" 庄子翼, in: Zhongguo zhexue da cidian 中国哲学大辞典. Zhang Dainian 张岱年 (Hrsg.). Shanghai 上海: Shanghai cishu chubanshe 上海辞书出版社 2010.
- Tu Lien-chê: "Chiao Hung" (in: ECCP: 145)
- Harold D. Roth: "Chuang tzu", in: M. Loewe (ed.): Early Chinese Texts: A Bibliographical Guide. 1993 (abb. ECT)
