= Neican =

Chinese government system of classified reporting

Internal Reference (Chinese: 内部参考), commonly abbreviated as neican (Chinese: 内参), is a multi-level system of classified reports prepared for Chinese Communist Party (CCP) and government officials in the People's Republic of China. Some Chinese journalists, including Xinhua News Agency correspondents in foreign countries, write for both the mass media and neican.

== Content ==
In the internal reference system of Xinhua News Agency, the internal reference reports are divided into four levels. The highest level is the Domestic Dynamics Proof Attachment (Chinese: 国内动态清样附页), which is specifically provided for members of the CCP Politburo Standing Committee and relevant officials, usually reflecting highly significant and urgent situations. The second level includes the Domestic Dynamics Proof (Chinese: 国内动态清样) and the international-news Reference Proof (Chinese: 参考清样), which are provided to provincial- and ministerial-level leaders and their deputies, mainly covering important developments, sensitive issues, and key recommendations. Additionally, the third-level Internal Reference (Chinese: 内部参考) is directed at prefectural and departmental levels, with a lower sensitivity level than the Domestic Dynamics Proof. The fourth level (lowest tier) is the Internal Reference Selection (Chinese: 内参选编), which compiles less sensitive content from the Internal Reference and the Domestic Dynamics Proof; issued weekly, it is distributed to county- and regiment-level grassroots cadres for internal reading and discussion, although it still allows more leeway than publicly available materials.

Xinhua reporters file certain internal reports to the CCP leadership from secure rooms in some Chinese embassies.

In addition to Xinhua News Agency, other state-run media outlets also publish internal publications in various formats. These include the Compilation of Public Letters (Chinese: 群众来信摘编), the Situation Compilation (Chinese: 情况汇编), and the Special Issue of the Situation Compilation (Chinese: 情况汇编特刊) by the People's Daily; the Situation Report (Chinese: 情况反映) by the Guangming Daily; the Compilation of Youth Letters (Chinese: 青年来信摘编) by the China Youth Daily; and the Situation Briefing (Chinese: 情况简报) by the Shanghai Jiefang Daily, among others.

According to the media censorship regulations, certain matters that media outlets believe would harm the image of the Chinese government, threaten social stability and unity, or other matters not suitable for open publication, such as certain events of corruption, social unrest, and large-scale business swindles, should be reported internally rather than publicly. Neican serves to keep CCP leaders informed about the issues that are seen as too sensitive be reported and discussed in the public publications. Thus, the internal reference is supposed to offer more realistic and less censored version of events. They are often similar in form to investigative reporting, and are prepared by the journalists working for the official media such as Xinhua News Agency and the People's Daily. As such, certain information collected by the Chinese media is published in the internal reference, not in the public publications. Some government-affiliated think tanks also produce neican, such as Grandview Institution.

The popularity of neican has been on the rise in recent years, with some estimates suggesting a several-fold increase in the last decade from 2000.

Since CCP general secretary Xi Jinping has consolidated power, neican have been subject to censorship previously applied only to media for the general public.

== Assessment ==
According to academic Wen-Hsuan Tsai, neican, in theory, aims to overcome information asymmetries common in authoritarian political systems where certain information may not reach top leadership. Neican has served as an early warning system for "mass incidents" and other protest in the service of maintaining stability of the CCP's political system.

Neican has been criticized for being slow and inefficient. Often, it focuses on information already available in the Internet, but not in Chinese traditional printed mainstream media, both of which are censored by the government and entail self-censorship of sensitive items. They are also seen as biased (produced by CCP members for other party members), often saying what the writers expect the superiors want to hear, and downplaying or omitting unpleasant news. It has also been noted to exhibit echo chamber effects given the censorship of the Internet in China. Like mass media in China, neican has been vulnerable to corruption in which business elites pay to bury stories. Criticism of Xi Jinping's policies is avoided in neican. As Hu Xingdou, a professor of social science at the Beijing Institute of Technology, notes: "[...] there are some issues that even neican won't touch", for example, military affairs and high-level corruption. In 2010, The Economist noted that neican had grown in importance, saying that "in the realm of the censored, half-censored content is king."

Some lower-level neican by lower-level non-popular media turn into profit centers for their publishers, which try to increase their subscription base. Sometimes, the term neican is used to refer to banned literature (books available only to individuals with certain clearances). Some have stated that the neican system "blurs the line between journalism and intelligence gathering."

== See also ==
- Classified information in China
- Chinese intelligence activity abroad
- Dibao (ancient Chinese gazette)
