= Li Jinzao =

Chinese politician

- 李金早
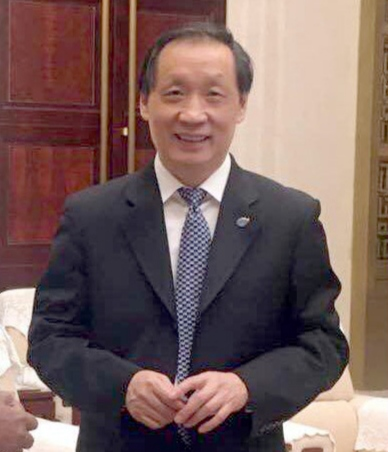
- Li in 2018

Vice-Minister of Culture and Tourism of China
- In office March 2018 – 4 September 2020
- Premier: Li Keqiang
- Minister: Luo Shugang

Chairman of the China National Tourism Administration
- In office October 2014 – March 2018
- Premier: Li Keqiang
- Preceded by: Shao Qiwei
- Succeeded by: Position revoked

Vice-Minister of Commerce
- In office October 2011 – October 2014
- Premier: Li Keqiang
- Minister: Chen Deming→Gao Hucheng

Executive Vice-Governor of Guangxi
- In office January 2008 – October 2011
- Governor: Ma Biao
- Preceded by: Guo Shengkun
- Succeeded by: Huang Daowei

Vice-Governor of Guangxi
- In office September 2003 – January 2008
- Governor: Lu Bing→Ma Biao

Director of the Development and Reform Commission of Guangxi Zhuang Autonomous Region
- In office April 2003 – November 2004

Communist Party Secretary of Guilin
- In office December 2001 – October 2002
- Preceded by: Jiang Xinghe
- Succeeded by: Mo Yongqing

Mayor of Guilin
- In office October 1998 – February 2002
- Preceded by: Cai Yonglun
- Succeeded by: Mo Yongqing

Personal details
- Born: January 1958 (age 68) Xiantao, Hubei, China
- Party: Chinese Communist Party (expelled; 1976-2021)
- Education: Zhongnan University of Economics and Law

Li Jinzao (Chinese: 李金早; pinyin: Lǐ Jīnzǎo; born January 1958) is a former Chinese politician. As of July 2020 he was under investigation by the Communist Party's anti-graft body. Previously he served as vice-minister of Culture and Tourism of China.

He was a delegate to the 16th and 17th and is a delegate to the 19th National Congress of the Chinese Communist Party. He was a deputy to the 9th and 10th and is a deputy to the 11th National People's Congress. He is a member of the 13th Standing Committee of the Chinese People's Political Consultative Conference.

== Biography ==
Li was born in January 1958 in Xiantao, Hubei. After the Cultural Revolution, he studied, then taught, at what is now Zhongnan University of Economics and Law. In 1984 he earned a master's degree in economic from Wuhan University. After university, he was assigned to the Ministry of Finance. In October 1988 he received his doctor's degree in economic from the Graduate School of Chinese Academy of Social Sciences. In October 1988, he joined the State Planning Commission.

In August 1996, he was transferred to Guilin, capital of Guangxi, where he was appointed vice-mayor, party chief of Qixing District and party chief of Guilin High-Tech Development Zone. He was promoted to mayor in October 1998. In December 2001 he was promoted again to become party chief. He became vice-governor of Guangxi in September 2003, and served until January 2008.

In October 2011 he was transferred to Beijing and appointed vice-minister of Commerce. In October 2014 he became chairman and party branch secretary of the China National Tourism Administration. After the institutional reform, he served as the vice-minister of vice-minister of Culture and Tourism in March 2018.

=== Investigation ===
On July 29, 2020, he has been placed under investigation for serious violations of laws and regulations by the party's disciplinary body. The Central Commission for Discipline Inspection said in a statement on its website, without elaborating. On September 4, he has been removed from the post of vice minister of Culture and Tourism.

On January 25, 2021, he was expelled from the Chinese Communist Party and removed from public office. On 21 October, he stood trial at the Intermediate People's Court of Shenyang on charges of taking bribes. Prosecutors accused Li of taking advantage of his different positions in both Guangxi and Beijing between 1996 and 2020 to seek profits for various companies and individuals in qualification approval, platform preparation, project contracting and job promotion. In return, he accepted money and property worth over 65.5 million yuan ($10.24 million).

On April 26, 2022, he was eventually sentenced to a 15-year jail and fined 6 million yuan for taking bribes.

Government offices
Preceded by Cai Yonglun (蔡永伦)	Mayor of Guilin; 1998-2002	Succeeded by Mo Yongqing (莫永清)
Preceded by Yang Daoxi (杨道喜)	Director of the Development and Reform Commission of Guangxi Zhuang Autonomous Region; 2003-2004	Succeeded by Mu Hong
Preceded by Guo Shengkun	Executive Vice-Governor of Guangxi; 2008-2011	Succeeded by Huang Daowei (黄道伟)
Preceded by Shao Qiwei (邵琪伟)	Chairman of the China National Tourism Administration; 2014-2018	Succeeded by Position revoked
Party political offices
Preceded by Jiang Xinghe (姜兴和)	Communist Party Secretary of Guilin; 2001-2002	Succeeded by Mo Yongqing (莫永清)
