= Ling Chengxing =

Chinese politician (born 1957)

- 凌成兴

Director of China Tobacco
- In office May 2013 – July 2018
- Preceded by: Jiang Chengkang
- Succeeded by: Zhang Jianmin

Personal details
- Born: October 1957 (age 68–69) Shanggao County, Jiangxi, China
- Party: Chinese Communist Party (1977–2024; expelled)
- Education: Huazhong Agricultural University; Central Party School of the Chinese Communist Party

Chinese name
- Simplified Chinese: 凌成兴
- Traditional Chinese: 凌成興
Transcriptions
Standard Mandarin
- Hanyu Pinyin: Líng Chéngxīng

Ling Chengxing (Chinese: 凌成兴; born October 1957) is a former Chinese politician who spent most of his career in his home-province, Jiangxi. He was investigated by China's top anti-graft agency in October 2023. He has been retired for 5 years. Previously he served as director of China Tobacco.

He was a representative of the 17th National Congress of the Chinese Communist Party. He was a delegate to the 12th National People's Congress.

== Career ==
Ling was born in Shanggao County, Jiangxi, in October 1957. He joined the Chinese Communist Party (CCP) in January 1977, and entered the workforce in December 1980.

He was appointed vice magistrate of Shanggao County in February 1984 and was admitted to member of the CCP Shanggao County Committee, the county's top authority. He was elevated to deputy party secretary and mayor of Fengcheng in March 1987.

He was made deputy director of the Jiangxi Provincial Economic Commission (later was reshuffled as Jiangxi Provincial Economic and Trade Commission) in August 1990 and subsequently director of the Jiangxi Provincial Tobacco Monopoly Bureau in August 1992. He became assistant to the governor of Jiangxi in July 1995, in addition to serving as director of the Jiangxi Provincial Economic Commission. He rose to become vice governor in December 2001, concurrently serving as director of Jiangxi Provincial State owned Assets Supervision and Administration Commission. He was promoted again to become executive vice governor in December that same year and was admitted to member of the CCP Jiangxi Provincial Committee, the province's top authority.

In May 2013, he was transferred to Beijing and appointed director and party group secretary of China Tobacco and general manager of China National Tobacco Corporation. He was also admitted to a member of the Party Group of the Ministry of Industry and Information Technology.

== Downfall ==
On 23 October 2023, he was suspected of "serious violations of laws and regulations" by the Central Commission for Discipline Inspection (CCDI), the party's internal disciplinary body, and the National Supervisory Commission, the highest anti-corruption agency of China. His deputies He Zehua (何泽华) and Zhao Hongshun (赵洪顺) were sacked for graft. Zhao was sentenced to life imprisonment in June 2020.

On 22 April 2024, he was expelled from the CCP and dismissed from public office.

On 7 May 2024, the Supreme People's Procuratorate announced that it had arrested Ling Chengxing on suspicion of bribery and abuse of power.

On 21 May 2025, Ling sentenced to 16 years in prison over corruption and fined 4 million yuan ($555,156) by the Changchun Intermediate People's Court.

Government offices
Preceded by ?	Director of Jiangxi Provincial Economic and Trade Commission; 1997	Succeeded by Yu Zhongyi (虞中一)
Preceded by Wu Minghui (吴明辉)	Director of Jiangxi Provincial State owned Assets Supervision and Administration Commission; 2006–2007	Succeeded by Li Tian'ou (李天鸥)
Preceded by Wu Xinxiong	Executive Vice Governor of Jiangxi; 2006–2013	Succeeded by Mo Jiancheng
Preceded by Jiang Chengkang	Director of China Tobacco; 2013–2018	Succeeded by Zhang Jianmin
