= Mo Yongqing =

Chinese politician

Mo Yongqing (Chinese: 莫永清; pinyin: Mò Yǒngqīng) (born October 1952) is a Chinese Communist Party (CCP) politician. Han Chinese, he is a native of Hepu, Guangxi. He began working in August 1971 and joined the CCP in June 1972. He graduated from the Correspondence Institute of the Central Party School of the CCP as a Research Associate. Later, he served as vice Director of the Standing Committee of the People's Congress of Guangxi Zhuang Autonomous Region.

== Early work ==
Mo was a teacher in the early 1970s and then the Deputy Secretary of the Committee of the Communist Youth League of Hepu County. From November 1974 to October 1985, he worked in the Committee of the Communist Youth League of the Guangxi Zhuang Autonomous Region.

== Career in politics ==
- October 1985 – January 1991: A secretary in the office of the Committee of the Communist party of Guangxi Zhuang Autonomous Region.
- January 1991 – August 1995: Secretary-General of the Nanning Municipal Committee of CCP.
- August – December 1995: Deputy Secretary of the Nanning Municipal Committee of CCP.
- December 1995 to February 2002: Deputy Secretary of the Disciplinary Commission of the Communist Party of Guangxi.
- April 1998 to February 2002: Director of supervision Department of the Government of Guangxi.
- February to October 2002: Deputy Secretary of the Guilin Municipal Committee of CCP and the Mayor of Guilin.
- October 2002 to April 2007: Secretary of the Guilin Municipal Committee of CCP.
- November 2006 to April 2007: Director of the Standing Committee of the People's Congress of Guilin.
- April 2007 to January 2008: Deputy Secretary of the People's Procuratorate of Guangxi, and then the Vice Director.
- January 2008 to present: Deputy director of the Eleventh Standing Committee of the People's Congress of Guangxi Zhuang Autonomous Region.
