= State Post Bureau =

Chinese government body regulating the national postal service of the PRC

- 国家邮政局; Guójiā Yóuzhèng Jú
- Emblem of the People's Republic of China

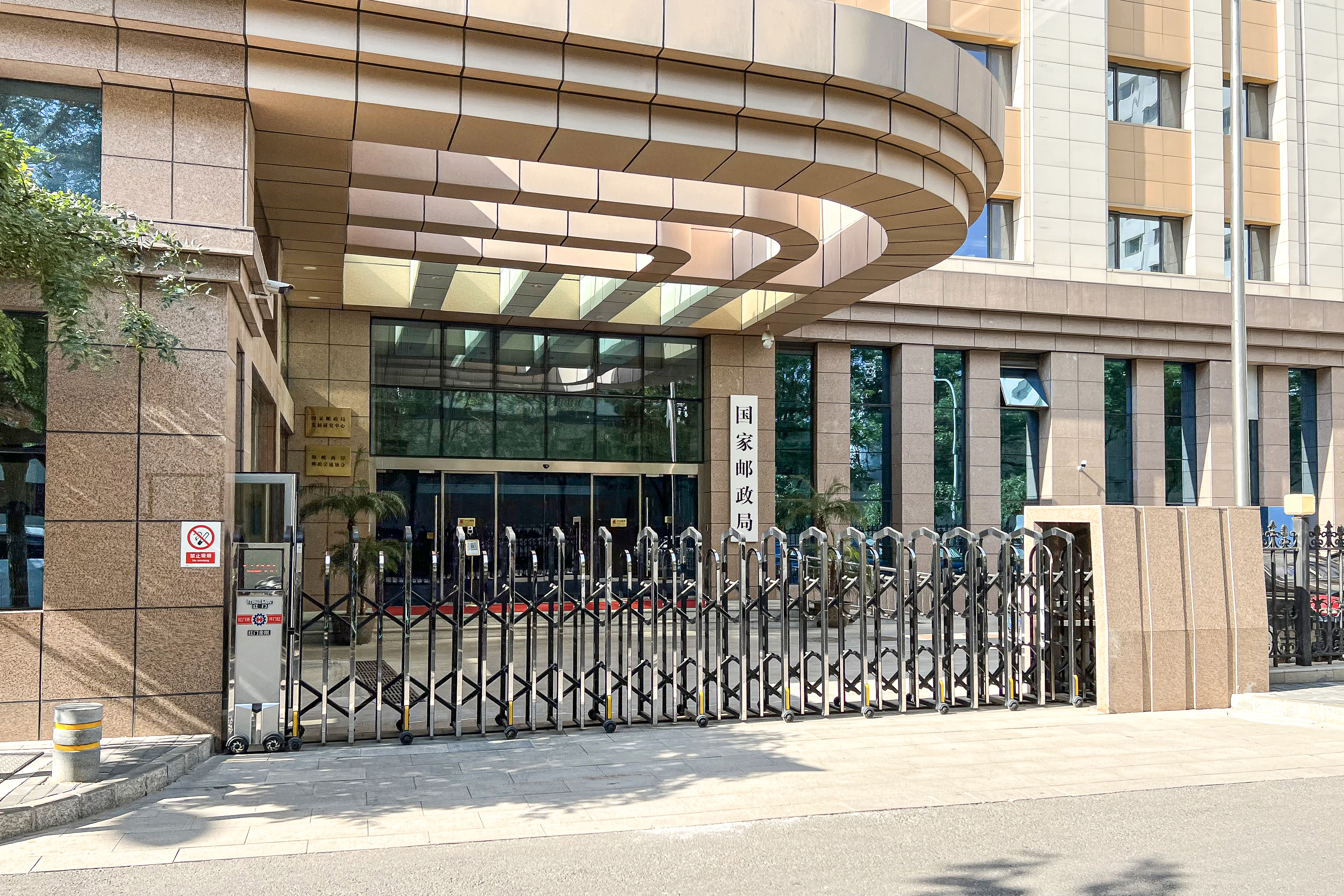
- Headquarters

Agency overview
- Formed: March 1998
- Preceding agency: Ministry of Post and Telecommunications
- Jurisdiction: People's Republic of China
- Headquarters: Beijing
- Agency executives: Zhao Chongjiu, Director General; Sheng Huiping, Deputy Director-General
- Parent agency: State Council via the Ministry of Transport
- Website: www.spb.gov.cn

State Post Bureau
- Simplified Chinese: 国家邮政局
- Traditional Chinese: 國家郵政局
Transcriptions
Standard Mandarin
- Hanyu Pinyin: Guójiā Yóuzhèng Jú
- IPA: [kwǒtɕjá jǒʊʈʂə̂ŋ tɕy̌]

The State Post Bureau is the government agency that regulates postal and express industry in Mainland China, including not only the state-owned China Post but also the express enterprises. The agency was created in 1998 as a successor to the Ministry of Post and Telecommunications in postal path. The agency used to report to the Ministry of Industry and Information Technology and is now under the administration of the Ministry of Transport. The bureau is headed by the Director-General. The current Director-General is Zhao Chongjiu (Chinese: 赵冲久).

== Functions ==
The SPB oversees the national postal industry, national postal enterprises, and helps formulate relevant laws and regulations in these areas. Its responsibilities includes protecting state interests and consumer rights, the development of the national postal network and universal postal delivery services.

== Administration ==
The SPB used to have post bureaus in all the administrative divisions of the country which serve as public utility enterprises. But since 2007, these post services has been divided to China Post, a state-owned enterprise.

=== Management ===
The agency is directed by a Director General and four Deputy Directors General.

Position	Name	Chinese
Director-General	Zhao Chongjiu	赵冲久
Deputy Director-General	Dai Yingjun	戴应军
Deputy Director-General	Liu Jun	刘君
Deputy Director-General	Zhao Min	赵民
Deputy Director-General	Liao Jinrong	廖进荣
Deputy Director-General	Chen Kai	陈凯

=== Directors ===
Name	Chinese name	Took office	Left office
Liu Liqing	刘立清	April 1998	April 2003
Liu Andong	刘安东	April 2003	November 2006
Ma Junsheng	马军胜	November 2006	September 2022
Zhao Chongjiu	赵冲久	29 September 2022	

=== Departmental structure ===
The agency is organized into the following departments.

- Department of General Affairs (Department of External Affairs)
- Department of Policies and Legal Affairs
- Department of Universal Services
- Department of Market Supervision & Inspection
- Department of Personnel
- Discipline Inspection Office (Party) and Supervision Bureau (executive)
- Administrative Service Center

== See also ==
- China Post (Mainland Area, People's Republic of China)
- Chunghwa Post (Taiwan Area, Republic of China)

Postal service in Hong Kong and Macau are not handled by the State Bureau nor China Post but by separate entities:

- Hongkong Post (Hong Kong SAR, People's Republic of China)
- Macau Post (Macau SAR, People's Republic of China)
