= Liu Yuzhu =

Chinese politician

- 刘玉珠

Director of the National Cultural Heritage Administration
- In office October 2015 – March 2021
- Premier: Li Keqiang
- Preceded by: Li Xiaojie
- Succeeded by: Li Qun

Personal details
- Born: December 1957 (age 68) Huaiyuan County, Anhui, China
- Party: Chinese Communist Party
- Education: East China University of Political Science and Law

Chinese name
- Traditional Chinese: 劉玉珠
- Simplified Chinese: 刘玉珠
Transcriptions
Standard Mandarin
- Hanyu Pinyin: Liǘ Yùzhū

Liu Yuzhu (Chinese: 刘玉珠; born December 1957) is a Chinese politician who was the director of the National Cultural Heritage Administration from October 2015 to July 2021.

He was a delegate to the 19th National Congress of the Chinese Communist Party.

== Biography ==
Liu was born in Huaiyuan County, Anhui, in December 1957. After the Resumption of College Entrance Examination in September 1979, he entered the East China University of Political Science and Law, where he majored in law. After university in 1983, he was assigned to the Ministry of Culture and over a period of 30 years worked his way up to the position of Assistant Minister. In October 2015 he was appointed director of the National Cultural Heritage Administration, replacing Li Xiaojie.

Government offices
Preceded by Li Xiaojie (励小捷)	Director of the National Cultural Heritage Administration; 2015	Incumbent
