= National Administration of Disease Control and Prevention =

Government agency of China

- 国家疾病预防控制局
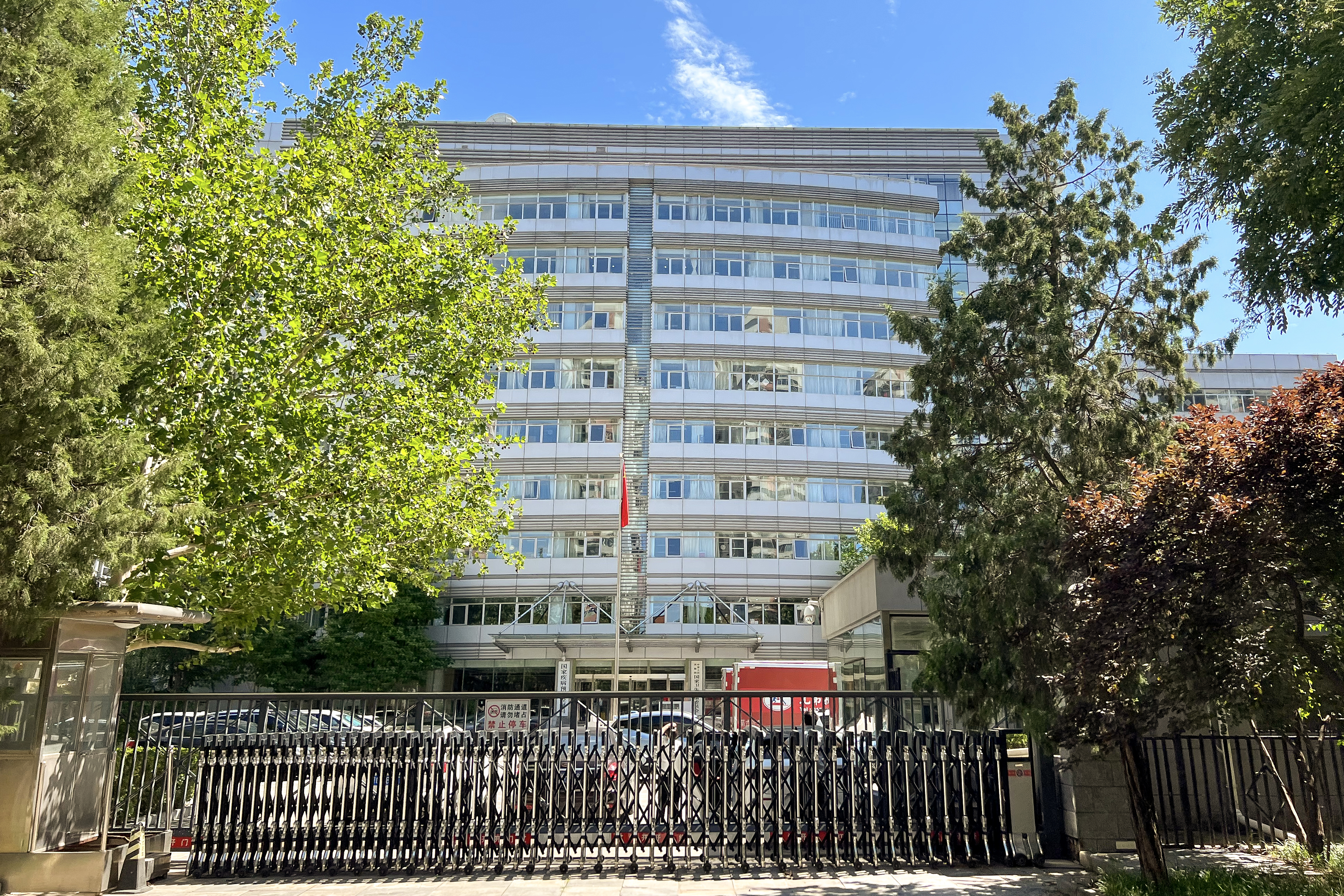
- Headquarters of the National Administration of Disease Control and Prevention

Agency overview
- Formed: April 2021; 5 years ago
- Jurisdiction: China
- Headquarters: 14 Zhichun Road, Haidian District, Beijing
- Agency executive: Wang Hesheng, Director
- Parent agency: National Health Commission
- Website: www.ndcpa.gov.cn

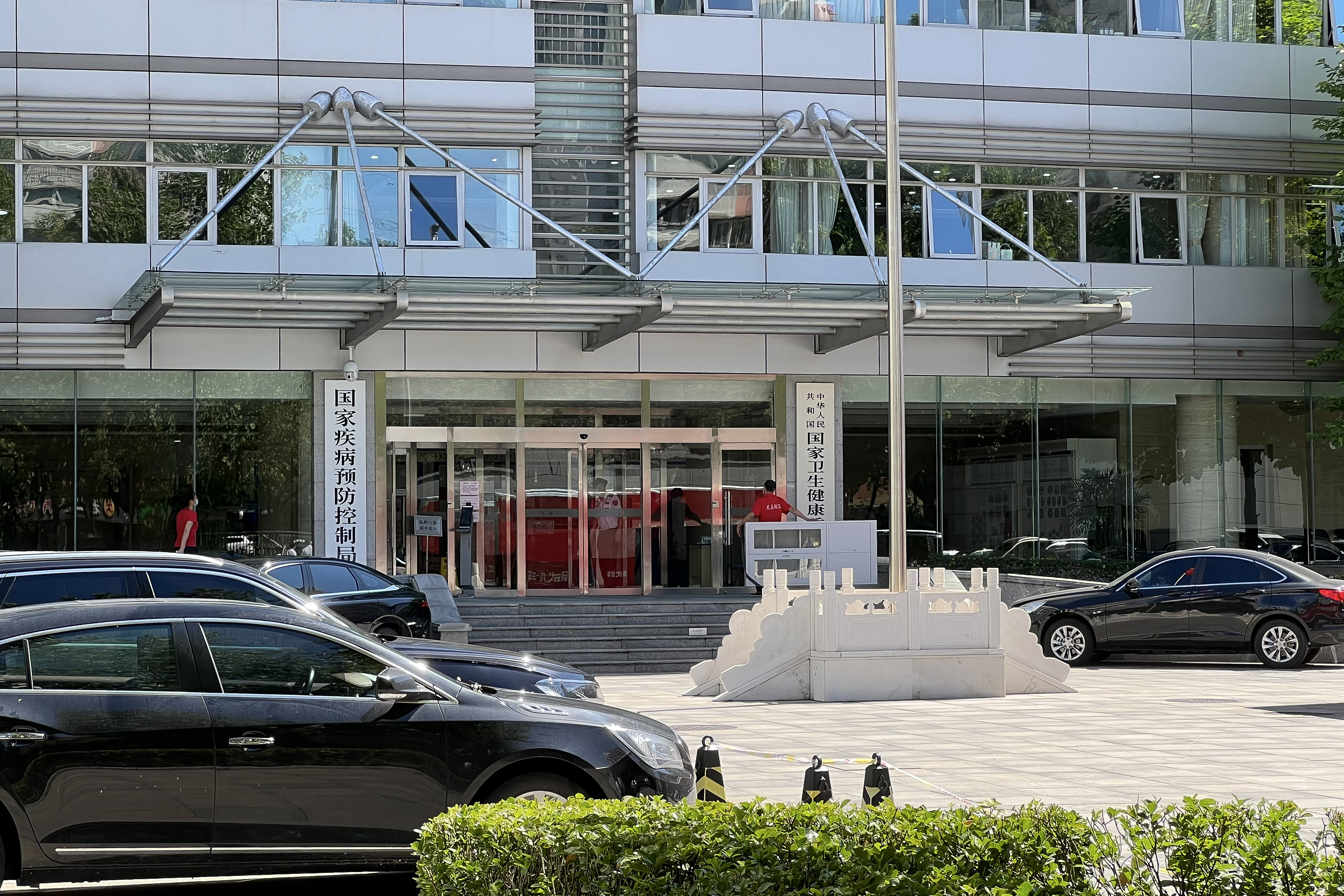
Gate of National Administration of Disease Control and Prevention.

The National Administration of Disease Control and Prevention (Chinese: 国家疾病预防控制局) is a deputy-ministerial-level agency under the National Health Commission of China. On May 13, 2021, the National Administration was officially listed at No. 14, Zhichun Road, Haidian District, Beijing.

== Development history ==
=== Internal bureau period ===
On October 27, 1949, in order to counter a plague in Chabei, the Government Affairs Council of the Central People's Government passed a resolution to establish the Central Epidemic Prevention Committee to uniformly lead the epidemic prevention work. Appointed were Nie Rongzhen (Deputy Chief of General Staff of the People's Liberation Army and Commander of the North China Military Region), Li Dequan (Minister of Health), and He Cheng (Vice Minister of Health) as chairman members. After the Chabei plague was deemed eradicated in December 1949, the Central Epidemic Prevention Committee was abolished, but most local epidemic prevention agencies were retained.

In 1954, the Ministry of Health of the People's Republic of China was established, and the Ministry of Health established the Department of Health and Epidemic Prevention of the Ministry of Health. In June 1968, the Military Control Committee of the Ministry of Health of the Chinese People's Liberation Army was stationed in the Ministry of Health. All departments and bureaus of the Ministry of Health were abolished, and the business group of the Ministry of Health was in charge of national health operations.

In 1981, the Ministry of Health established the Epidemic Prevention Bureau of the Ministry of Health. In July 1982, it was reorganized into the Health and Epidemic Prevention Department of the Ministry of Health. In 1986, the Bureau of Endemic Disease Prevention and Control of the Ministry of Health was added. In 1988, the Bureau of Endemic Disease Prevention and Control of the Ministry of Health was changed into the department. After the institutional reform of the State Council in 1993, the Department of Health and Epidemic Prevention and the Department of Endemic Disease Prevention and Control of the Ministry of Health merged to form the Department of Disease Control of the Ministry of Health. In 2005, the Department of Disease Control of the Ministry of Health was renamed the Bureau of Disease Control and Prevention of the Ministry of Health.

In 2013, the Ministry of Health was abolished and the National Health and Family Planning Commission was established. The bureau was accordingly renamed the National Bureau of Disease Control and Prevention of the National Health and Family Planning Commission. In 2018, the National Health and Family Planning Commission was abolished and the National Health Commission was established. The bureau was accordingly renamed the National Bureau of Disease Control and Prevention of the National Health Commission.

=== National Bureau period ===
On April 28, 2021, the State Council of China appoints Wang Hesheng, vice minister of the National Health Commission, as the director of the National Administration of Disease Control and Prevention. Chang Jile, director of the National Administration of Disease Control and Prevention of the National Health Commission of China, Shen Hongbing, President of Nanjing Medical University Academician and Sun Yang of the Emergency Office of the National Health Commission of China (Emergency Command Center for Public Health Emergencies) were appointed as deputy directors.

At 10:00 on May 13, 2021, the National Administration of Disease Control and Prevention of China was officially listed at No. 14, Zhichun Road, Haidian District, Beijing. The establishment of the National Administration of Disease Control and Prevention of China means that the functions of the disease control agency have shifted from simply preventing and controlling diseases to comprehensively maintaining and promoting the health of the entire population. The new agency will assume five major functions, including formulating policies for the prevention and control of infectious diseases.

== Leaders ==
=== Directors ===
Name	Chinese name	Took office	Left office	Ref.
Wang Hesheng	王贺胜	28 April 2021	Incumbent	

=== Deputy Directors ===
1. Chang Jile (April 28, 2021 – present)
2. Sun Yang (孙阳) (April 28, 2021 – present)
3. Lu Jiang (卢江) (June 10, 2021 – present)
