= National Mine Safety Administration =

Chinese state regulatory body

- 国家矿山安全监察局
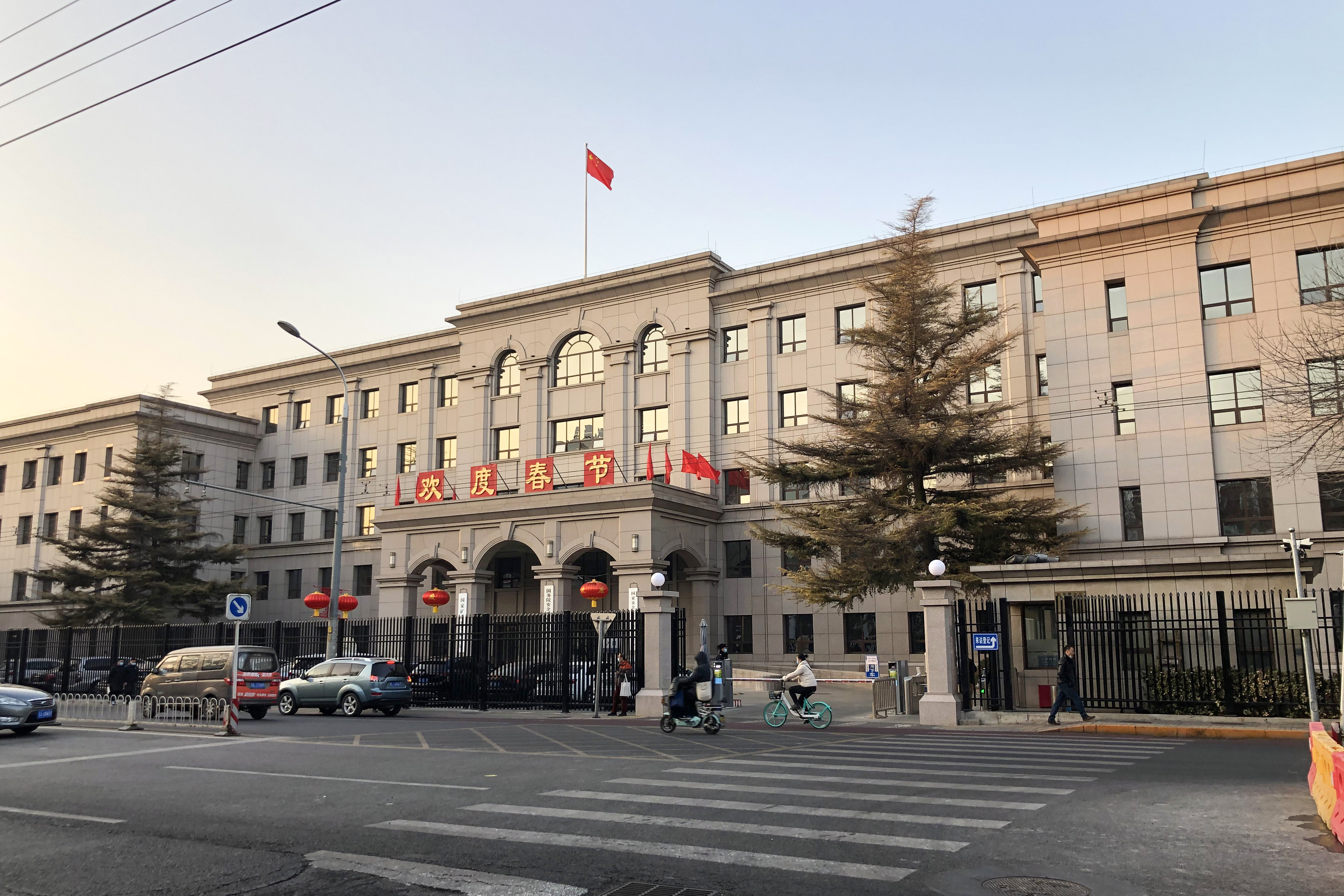
- National Mine Safety Administration housed at the former Ministry of Coal Industry

Agency overview
- Formed: September 22, 2020; 5 years ago
- Jurisdiction: China
- Headquarters: 21 Hepingli North Street, Dongcheng, Beijing
- Agency executive: Huang Jinsheng, Director
- Parent agency: Ministry of Emergency Management
- Website: www.chinamine-safety.gov.cn

National Mine Safety Administration
- Simplified Chinese: 国家矿山安全监察局
- Traditional Chinese: 國家礦山安全監察局
Transcriptions
Standard Mandarin
- Hanyu Pinyin: Guójiā kuàngshān ānquán jiānchá jú

The National Mine Safety Administration (NMSA) is a national bureau under the Ministry of Emergency Management of the State Council of China in charge of safety supervision and inspection of coal and non-coal mines.

== History ==
On 22 September 2020, the General Office of the Central Committee of the Chinese Communist Party and the General Office of the State Council released a notice transferring the safety supervision responsibilities of the Ministry of Emergency Management for non-coal mines (including geological exploration) to the National Mine Safety Administration. The National Mine Safety Administration was unveiled on 10 December 2020.

== Leadership ==
=== Directors ===
| Name | Chinese name | Took office | Left office | Ref. |
|---|---|---|---|---|
| Huang Yuzhi | 黄玉治 | 1 December 2020 | 14 May 2023 | |
| Huang Jinsheng | 黄锦生 | 14 May 2023 | Incumbent | |
