= Ma Junsheng =

Chinese politician

- 马军胜
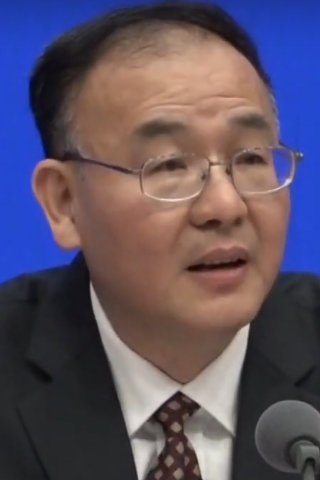
- Ma in September 2019

Director of the State Post Bureau
- Incumbent
- Assumed office November 2006
- Preceded by: Liu Andong

Personal details
- Born: 15 August 1961 (age 65) Ningyang County, Shandong, China
- Party: Chinese Communist Party
- Education: Nanjing University of Posts and Telecommunications

Chinese name
- Simplified Chinese: 马军胜
- Traditional Chinese: 馬軍勝
Transcriptions
Standard Mandarin
- Hanyu Pinyin: Mǎ Jūnshèng

Ma Junsheng (Chinese: 马军胜; born 15 August 1961) is a Chinese politician who was the director of the State Post Bureau from November 2006 to September 2022.

He was a member of the 11th and 12th National Committee of the Chinese People's Political Consultative Conference.

== Biography ==
Ma was born in Ningyang County, Shandong, on 15 August 1961, and graduated from Nanjing University of Posts and Telecommunications. He joined the Chinese Communist Party (CCP) in July 1991. He was assigned to the Ministry of Posts and Telecommunications in April 1996. In September 1998, he became deputy director of the State Post Bureau in September 1998, rising to director in November 2006.

Government offices
Preceded by Liu Andong	Director of the State Post Bureau; 2006–2022	Succeeded by Zhao Chongjiu
