= Wang Hesheng (politician) =

Chinese politician

- 王贺胜
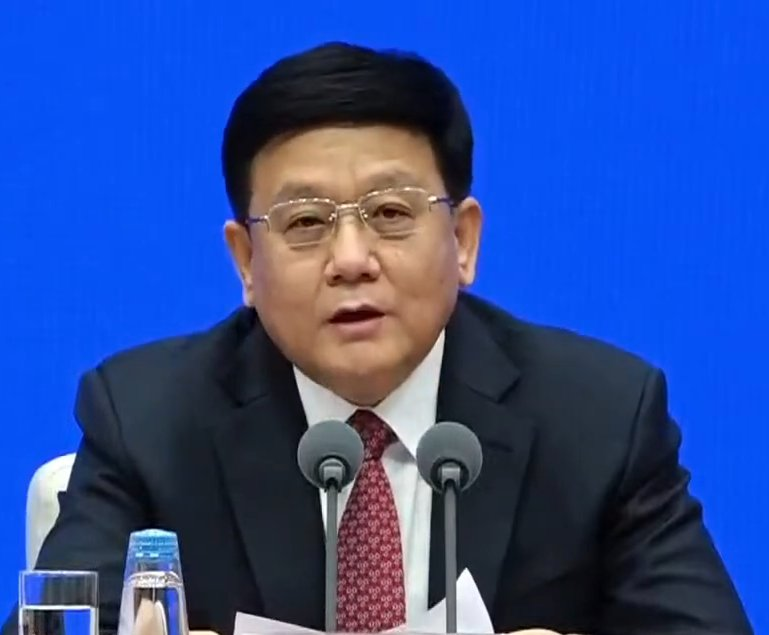

Vice Minister of the National Health Commission
- Incumbent
- Assumed office March 2018
- Leader: Ma Xiaowei (director)

Personal details
- Born: June 1961 (age 65) Qingyuan District, Baoding, Hebei, China
- Party: Chinese Communist Party
- Education: Tianjin Medical University

Chinese name
- Traditional Chinese: 王賀勝
- Simplified Chinese: 王贺胜
Transcriptions
Standard Mandarin
- Hanyu Pinyin: Wáng Hèshèng

Wang Hesheng (Chinese: 王贺胜; born June 1961) is a Chinese politician currently serves as a vice minister of the National Health Commission and the inaugural director of the National Bureau of Disease Control and Prevention.

== Biography ==
Wang was born in Qingyuan District, Baoding, Hebei, in June 1961. After the resumption of National College Entrance Examination, he studied, then worked, at what is now Tianjin Medical University. He joined the Chinese Communist Party (CCP) in June 1984.

He had a brief assignment to the Tianjin Municipal Education Commission and the CCP Tianjin Municipal Education and Health Committee. In August 2005 he was promoted to become Party secretary of Tianjin Academy of Fine Arts, a position he held until May 2008, when he was appointed Party secretary of Tianjin Health Bureau, which was renamed Tianjin Municipal Health and Family Planning Commission in 2014. In December 2014 he became deputy leader of the CCP Tianjin Municipal Propaganda Department, rising to the leader position half a year later.

In August 2016 he was appointed deputy director and member of the Party Leadership Group, the National Health and Family Planning Commission, heading healthcare reform, medical administration and primary health. He also served as director of the Health Care Reform Office under the State Council.

In early February 2020, Wang was transferred to central China's Hubei province and appointed standing committee member of the CCP Hubei Provincial Committee on February 8. On February 10, Zhang Jin, Party branch secretary of the Hubei Provincial Health Commission and its director Liu Yingzhi, were removed from their posts, the two posts were both shouldered by Wang Hesheng.

Party political offices
Preceded by Cheng Qisheng	Leader of the CPC Tianjin Municipal Propaganda Department; 2015–2016	Succeeded by Chen Zhemin
Preceded by Zhang Jin (张晋)	Party Branch Secretary of the Hubei Provincial Health Commission; 2020	Incumbent
Government offices
Preceded by Liu Yingzi (刘英姿)	Director of the Hubei Provincial Health Commission; 2020	Incumbent
