= Central Secrecy Commission =

Chinese Communist Party body

- 中央保密委员会
- Emblem of the Chinese Communist Party

Agency overview
- Type: Policy coordination and consultation body
- Jurisdiction: Chinese Communist Party
- Headquarters: Beijing
- Agency executives: Cai Qi, Director; Meng Xiangfeng, Deputy Director; Li Zhaozong, Office Director
- Parent agency: Central Committee of the Chinese Communist Party
- Child agency: Office

Central Secrecy Commission
- Simplified Chinese: 中央保密委员会
Transcriptions
Standard Mandarin
- Hanyu Pinyin: Zhōngyāng Bǎomì Wěiyuánhuì

The Central Secrecy Commission is an agency of the Central Committee of the Chinese Communist Party responsible for work related to classified information.

== History ==
In June 1946, the CCP Central Committee decided to change the Central Confidentiality Commission (中共中央机要委员会) to the Central Secrecy Commission (中共中央保密委员会) On 19 May 1948, the Central Committee issued a charter defining the nature, tasks, members and working methods of the committee. In May 1953, per the instructions of Premier Zhou Enlai, the Office of the Central Secrecy Commission was established. On 20 April 1956, the commission was abolished. It was re-established on 5 May 1960. The work of the commission was disrupted during the Cultural Revolution. On 9 July 1978, after the end of the Cultural Revolution, the commission was restored.

== Role ==
The commission is responsible for work related to classified information, The Office of the Central Secrecy Commission, also known as the National Administration of State Secrets Protection, is responsible for safeguarding classified information.
