= Ministry of Transport (China) =

People's Republic of China government ministry overseeing air and land travel

Ministry of Transport of the People's Republic of China
- 中华人民共和国交通运输部; Zhōnghuá Rénmín Gònghéguó Jiāotōng Yùnshūbù
- Emblem of the People's Republic of China

- Sign of the Traffic Law Enforcement of the PRC

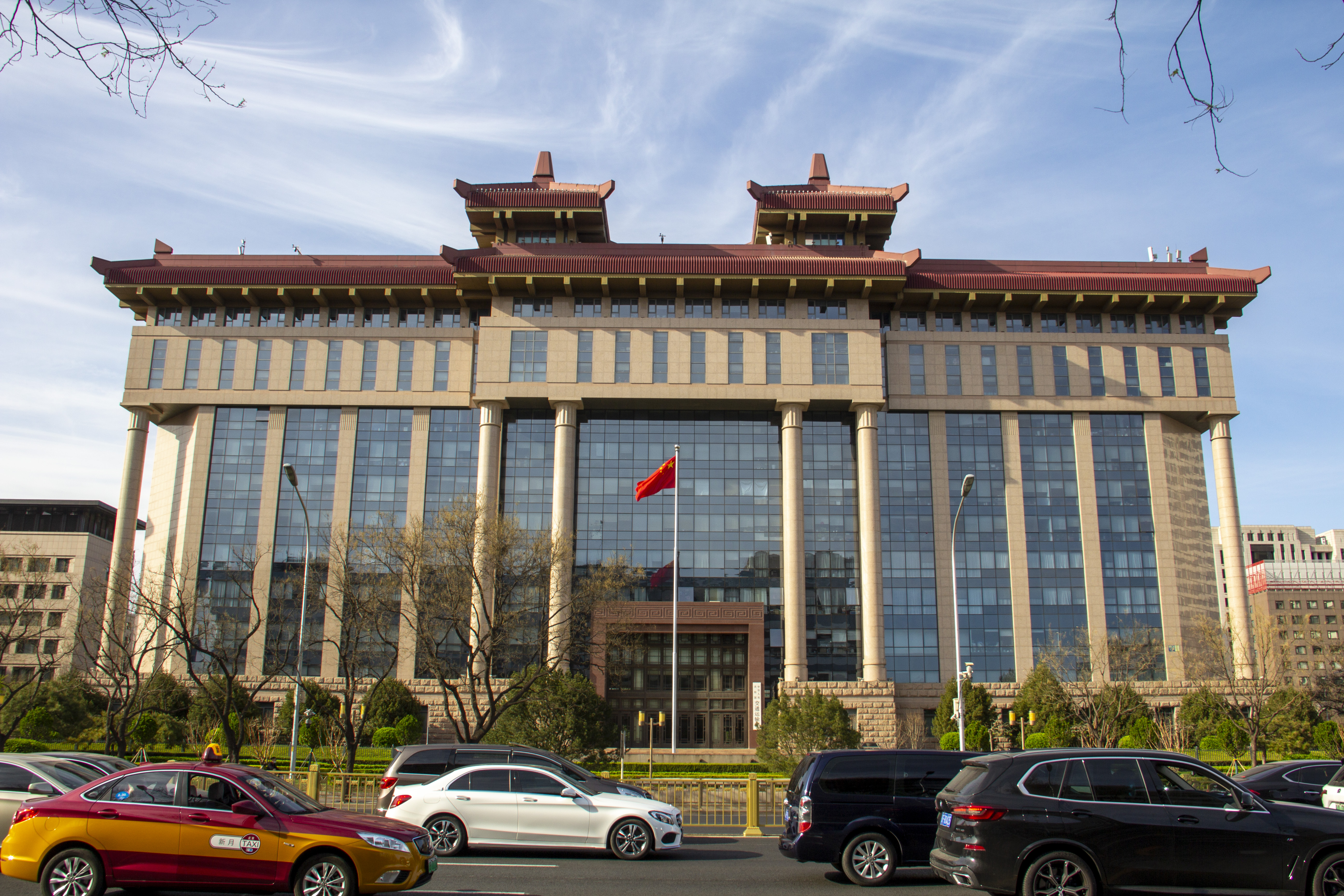
- Headquarters on Jian'guomennei Dajie

Agency overview
- Formed: 1954; 72 years ago
- Preceding agencies: Ministry of Communications of the People's Republic of China; Civil Aviation Administration; State Postal Bureau; Ministry of Railways
- Jurisdiction: Government of China
- Headquarters: Beijing
- Minister responsible: Liu Wei, Ministry
- Deputy Ministers responsible: Xu Chengguang, Chief Planner; Fu Xuyin, Administrator of Maritime Safety Administration; Wang Gang; Li Yang
- Agency executives: Zou Tianjing, Leader of Discipline and Inspection & Supervision Team; Zhao Chongjiu, Director-General of State Post Bureau; Song Zhiyong, Administrator of Civil Aviation Administration; Fei Dongbin, Administrator of National Railway Administration; Li Tianbi, Chief Engineer
- Parent agency: State Council
- Website: www.mot.gov.cn

The Ministry of Transport of the People's Republic of China (Chinese: 中华人民共和国交通运输部) is an agency responsible for railway, road, air and water transportation regulations in China. It is a constituent department of the State Council.

== Function ==
The Ministry of Transport's functions include coordinating the transport system, guiding and planning the management of transport hubs, and implementing policies and standards for highways, waterways, and civil aviation.

== History ==
The MOT's origins date back to 1912 when the Ministry of Transportation and Communications of the Republic of China was established.

In early March 2008, the National People's Congress announced the creation of a combined ministry for road, air and water transport. The Ministry of Communications, Civil Aviation Administration and the State Postal Bureau were merged into the new Ministry of Transportation. This excluded rail transport, which was administered by the Ministry of Railways until its regulatory function passed to the MOT in March 2013.

Several agencies reporting to the Ministry. These include:

- Civil Aviation Administration of China
- State Post Bureau, which regulates China Post
- China Maritime Safety Administration

=== Former English name ===
One predecessor to the current ministry was the Ministry of Communications (MOC). In other countries, a Ministry of Communications is responsible for telecommunications and broadcasting. However, the Chinese MOC supervised road and water transport, with other ministries overseeing telecommunications and broadcasting. This discrepancy was caused by changes in the English language that took place after the Ministry was first created.

One definition of the English word communication is the linking of two points by a means of transport. Roads, railways, and waterways were all considered to be forms of communication. When the Qing Dynasty established the Ministry of Posts and Communications in 1906, the English word communication still carried this meaning. After the People's Republic of China was established, other ministries were created to oversee railways, airlines, postal services, and telecommunications. The remaining transportation functions remained with the Ministry of Communications.

However, the English language moved in the opposite direction. By 1907, communication had begun to acquire a different meaning: a system of transmitting information over a distance. This eventually became the primary meaning of the word communication, while transport and transportation became the preferred terms for the linking of two points. As a result, the Chinese Ministry of Communications ended up with a different set of responsibilities from the Ministry of Communications in other countries.

== See also ==
- Ministries of the People's Republic of China
- Ministry of Transportation and Communications, parallel ministry of the Republic of China
