= State Cryptography Administration =

Institution of the State Council of the People's Republic of China

- 国家密码管理局
- National emblem of China

Agency overview
- Formed: March 25, 2005
- Jurisdiction: China
- Headquarters: 7 Dianchang Road, Fengtai District, Beijing
- Agency executive: Liu Dongfang, Director
- Parent agency: Central Cryptography Leading Group
- Website: www.sca.gov.cn

State Cryptography Administration
- Simplified Chinese: 国家密码管理局
Transcriptions
Standard Mandarin
- Hanyu Pinyin: Guójiā Mìmǎ Guǎnlǐ Jú

Office of the Central Leading Group for Cryptography
- Simplified Chinese: 中央密码工作领导小组办公室
Transcriptions
Standard Mandarin
- Hanyu Pinyin: Zhōngyāng Mìmǎ Gōngzuò Lǐngdǎo Xiǎozǔ Bàngōngshì

The State Cryptography Administration (SCA) is a national bureau of the State Council of China that is responsible for cryptography. It is under the Chinese Communist Party's Central Cryptography Leading Group.

Under the "one institution with two names" arrangement, it is also the Office of the Central Cryptography Leading Group under the General Office of the CCP Central Committee.

== History ==
The SCA was established on 25 March 2005.

== Functions ==
The SCA is responsible for work related to cryptography. It implements CCP and state policies in regard to cryptography, proposes suggestions about cryptography work, investigates illegal development and use of cryptography, is responsible for cryptographic work relating to foreign entities, develops plans on cryptographic work, drafts and is responsible for the implementation of cryptographic work regulations, is responsible for managing cryptography research, production, sales, evaluation, and application, plans and manages of cryptographic systems in China, and guides professional cryptography education.
