= Jiao Hong =

Chinese philosopher (1540–1620)

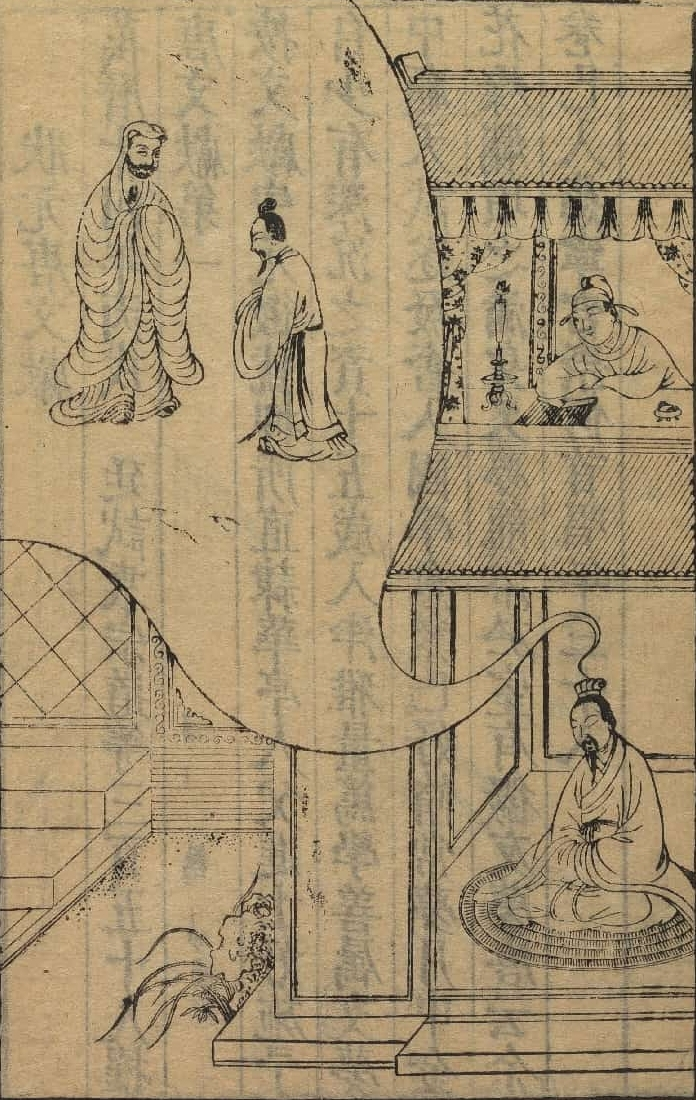
Jiao Hong

Jiao Hong (Chinese: 焦竑; 1540–1620), courtesy name Ruohou (Chinese: 弱侯; pinyin: Ruòhóu), pseudonym Zhanyuan (Chinese: 澹園; pinyin: Zhānyuán) was a Chinese philosopher and historian of the late Ming dynasty.

Jiao Hong was a native of Nanjing. At the age of 25, he passed the provincial examination and got the Juren degree. However, it would take him another 25 years to pass the imperial examination in 1589. He obtained the first rank (Zhuangyuan) and was appointed Xiuzhuan (修撰) of the Hanlin Academy.

Jiao Hong had the opinion that man was the most important factor in history. He therefore compiled volumes of biographies of Ming period persons, named Guochao xianzheng lu (國朝獻征錄), which is considered as an important addendum to the official History of Ming (明史). Other important writings of him include Danyuan ji (澹園集), Danyuan xuji (澹園續集), Jiaoshi bicheng (焦氏筆乘), Jiaoshi leilin (焦氏類林), Yutang congyu (玉堂叢語), Laozi yi (老子翼), Zhuangzi yi (莊子翼), and Sushu kanwu (俗書刊誤).
