= National Archives Administration of China =

National archives of China

National Archives Administration (of the People's Republic of China) Central Archives (of the Chinese Communist Party)
- 国家档案局 中央档案馆

Administrative agency overview
- Formed: 1954
- Jurisdiction: China
- Headquarters: Beijing
- Administrative agency executive: Lu Guoqiang, Secretary / Curator
- Parent department: General Office of the Chinese Communist Party
- Parent administrative agency: State Council of the People's Republic of China
- Child agencies: First Historical Archives of China; Second Historical Archives of China
- Website: www.saac.gov.cn

The National Archives Administration of China (国家档案局) is the national administrative agency responsible for historical records of the state dating back to imperial times in China. The archive collections include more than 800,000 records. There are more than 80 million items of information in documents, records, files, manuscripts on important political figures. The agency also concurrently holds records for the Central Committee of the Chinese Communist Party. Hence it is also known as the Central Archives (中央档案馆).

== History ==
The National Archives Agency was established in November 1954, as a national agency subordinated to the State Council of the People's Republic of China. In 1959, CCP Central Committee decided the National Archives was not just an archive agency for the communist party and it should be also a state agency for repository of state official records.

In 1970, the National Archives was made defunct. In 1979, the National Archives was reestablished. In 1985, the CCP Central Committee and State Council decided to change the National Archives owned by the State Council of the People's Republic of China leadership to manage all the archival work of the State Council executive government departments, all subordinated agencies administered by or reporting to the State Council.

Central Archives agency was established separately in June 1959 by the CCP Central Committee to archive important documents for the party central committee and the central authorities.

In 1993, the National Archives and Central Archives agency were merged into one unified agency called the State Archives Administration operating two archives, one for the state and one for the ruling political party.

== Subordinate archives ==
1. First Historical Archives of China in Beijing, holds document of the Ming and Qing dynasties and all dynasties before.
2. Second Historical Archives of China in Nanjing, holds document of the Republic of China (1912–1949), including both Beijing (Beiyang) and Nanjing (Kuomintang) governments.

== Administration ==
The agency is structured in the following departments.

=== Internal units ===
- Office
- Archival storage Department
- Archival Use Department
- Finance Department
- Policies and regulations Research Department
- Foreign Affairs Office
- Information Management Centre

=== Affiliations ===
- China Archives Newspaper
- China Archives Press
- Archives of Science and Technology Institute
- Archival cadres and Education Centre
- Chinese Archives magazine

=== Secretary for the National Archives ===
- Zeng San (1954.11 - 1966.11)
- Yang Qing (1966.07 - 1967.01)
- Zhang Zhong (1979.06 - 1983.01)
- Han Yuhu (1983.02 - 1988.11)
- Feng Zizhi (1988.11 - 1994.01)
- Wang Gang (1994.01 - 2000.01)
- Mao Fumin (2000.01 - 2006.07)
- Yang Dongquan (2006.07 - 2015.08)
- Li Minghua (2015.08 - 2020.06)
- Lu Guoqiang (2020.06 - present)

=== Curator of the Central Archives ===
- Zeng San (1959.06 - 1966)
- Xiao Guang (1970.01 - 1979.06, curator of the CCP Central Committee archives)
- Zeng San (1979.06 – 1982.02)
- Wang Mingzhe (1982.02 - 1993.12)
- Wang Gang (1993.12 - 1999.12)
- Mao Fumin (1999.12 - 2006.07)
- Yang Dongquan (2006.07 - 2015.07)
- Li Minghua (2015.07 - 2020.05)
- Lu Guoqiang (2020.05 - present)

== See also ==
- List of national archives
- Archives of Yuhuan
