= National Administration of State Secrets Protection =

Institution of the State Council of the People's Republic of China

- 国家保密局
- National Emblem of China

Agency overview
- Formed: March 1988
- Jurisdiction: China
- Headquarters: 49 Dongrongxian Hutong, Xicheng District, Beijing
- Agency executive: Li Zhaozong, Director
- Parent agency: Central Secrecy Commission; General Office
- Website: www.gjbmj.gov.cn

National Administration of State Secrets Protection
- Simplified Chinese: 国家保密局
- Literal meaning: State Secret-Protecting Bureau
Transcriptions
Standard Mandarin
- Hanyu Pinyin: Guójiā Bǎomì Jú

Office of the Central Secrecy Commission
- Simplified Chinese: 中央保密委员会办公室
- Literal meaning: Central Secret-Protecting Commission Office
Transcriptions
Standard Mandarin
- Hanyu Pinyin: Zhōngyāng Bǎomì Wěiyuánhuì Bàngōngshì

The National Administration of State Secret Protection is an institution of the State Council of the People's Republic of China that is responsible for the protection of classified information. It is under the Chinese Communist Party's Central Secrecy Commission.

Under the "one institution with two names" arrangement, it is also the Office of the Central Secrecy Commission under the General Office of the CCP Central Committee.

== Overview ==
The administration is responsible for the protection of classified information. The Criminal Law of the People's Republic of China (which is not operative in the Special Administrative Regions of Hong Kong and Macao) makes it a crime to release a state secret. Under the 1989 "Law on Guarding State Secrets," state secrets are defined as those that concern:

1. Major policy decisions on state affairs;
2. The building of national defence and in the activities of the armed forces;
3. Diplomatic activities and in activities related to foreign countries and those to be maintained as commitments to foreign countries;
4. National economic and social development;
5. Science and technology;
6. Activities for preserving state security and the investigation of criminal offences; and
7. Any other matters classified as "state secrets" by the national State Secrets Bureau.

Secrets can be classified into one of three categories:

- Top secret (绝密): Defined as "vital state secrets whose disclosure would cause extremely serious harm to state security and national interests";
- Highly secret (机密): Defined as "important state secrets whose disclosure would cause serious harm to state security and national interests"; and
- Secret (秘密): Defined as "ordinary state secrets whose disclosure would cause harm to state security and national interests".
