= China Tobacco =

Chinese state-owned company and regulation agency

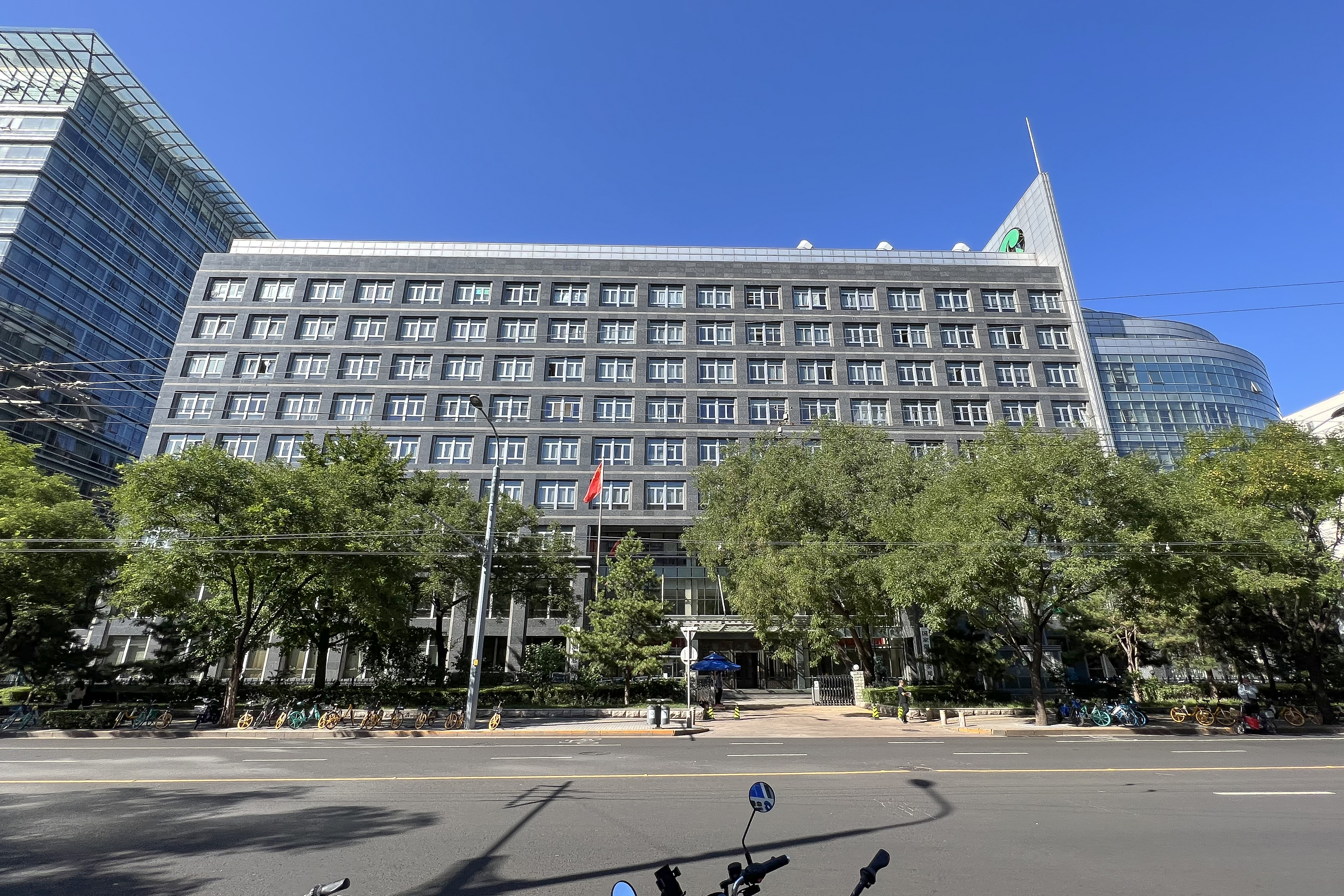
- China Tobacco headquarters in Beijing
- Native name: 中国烟草
- Type: Government agency and Central government-owned corporation (one institution with two names)
- Industry: Tobacco
- Founded: January 1982
- Headquarters: 55 South Yuetan Street, Xicheng District, Beijing, China, 100045
- Area served: China
- Key people: Zhang Jianmin (张建民; Director of State Tobacco Monopoly Administration, President of China National Tobacco Corporation)
- Products: Cigarettes
- Owner: Chinese Central Government
- Parent: Ministry of Industry and Information Technology
- Website: www.tobacco.gov.cn

China Tobacco
- Simplified Chinese: 中国烟草
- Traditional Chinese: 中國煙草
Transcriptions

China National Tobacco Corporation
- Simplified Chinese: 中国烟草总公司
- Traditional Chinese: 中國煙草總公司
Transcriptions

Second alternative Chinese name
- Simplified Chinese: 国家烟草专卖局
- Traditional Chinese: 國家菸草專賣局
Transcriptions
Standard Mandarin
- Hanyu Pinyin: Guójiā Yāncǎo Zhuānmài Jú

Third alternative Chinese name
- Simplified Chinese: 国家烟草局
- Traditional Chinese: 國家煙草局
Transcriptions

China National Tobacco Corporation (CNTC; Chinese: 中国烟草总公司), branded as China Tobacco (中国烟草), is a Chinese central government-owned corporation with nationally chartered monopoly status to manufacture and sell tobacco products in China since 1981.

The State Tobacco Monopoly Administration (STMA; 国家烟草专卖局) is a Chinese central government agency responsible for national tobacco monopoly regulation, under the Ministry of Industry and Information Technology. Chartered in 1984 through the policy of one institution with two names, the two agencies are co-located in the same office and share the same website.

China Tobacco enjoys a legal monopoly in the country, accounting for 96% of cigarette sales in the country, and is the world's largest manufacturer of tobacco products by revenue.

== History ==
In 1981, Chinese leader Deng Xiaoping established the China National Tobacco Corporation in order to modernize the previously fragmented tobacco market; the corporation received nationally chartered monopoly status to manufacture and sell tobacco products in the country. In January 1984, the State Council approved the transformation of the Tobacco Monopoly Bureau of the Ministry of Light Industry into the State Tobacco Monopoly Administration, which operated under the same organization and two names as the China National Tobacco Corporation; both the corporation and the administration agency were under the management of the Ministry of Light Industry.

CNTC originally oversaw a decentralized system of provincial companies and factories. During the 1990s and 2000s, reforms consolidated hundreds of small plants into larger enterprises under central coordination, creating a more unified national monopoly. A major objective was modernization: as late as the 1980s, many factories used outdated manual equipment. The monopoly allowed limited entry of foreign firms in exchange for modern machinery, while protecting the domestic market. By the early 2000s, China Tobacco was producing one-third of the world's cigarettes, employing over half a million people nationwide, and contributing between 7% and 11% of government revenue.

== Organization and functions ==
The China National Tobacco Corporation and the State Tobacco Monopoly Administration are one institution with two names. The STMA is an agency of the Ministry of Industry and Information Technology. The organization enforces the state tobacco monopoly and operates as China Tobacco for production, marketing, distribution, and sales. China Tobacco remains deeply integrated with government, creating what scholars have described as a conflict of interest between economic interests and public health regulation. Local bureaus and factories remain important actors under provincial monopoly administrations, though central authorities increasingly direct consolidation and brand strategy. China Tobacco oversees a large portfolio of cigarette brands, historically numbering in the hundreds across provincial factories. Since the 1990s, the company has pursued a strategy of consolidation, reducing the number of small regional labels and promoting stronger national brands.

== Global expansion ==
Although historically inward-looking, CNTC has adopted strategies for internationalization since the 2000s, motivated by market saturation at home and rising public health regulation. These include promoting export brands, acquiring overseas operations, and forming partnerships with foreign tobacco firms. Scholars note, however, that despite its status as the world's largest cigarette producer, CNTC's global presence remains limited compared to other multinational tobacco corporations.

One notable overseas contribution has been in Zimbabwe, where CNTC subsidiary Tian Ze Tobacco has played a key role in revitalizing the country's tobacco sector. Following the collapse of production in the 2000s following land reforms, Tian Ze introduced contract farming, offering farmers favorable loans, technical assistance, and higher purchase prices compared to competitors. As a result, Zimbabwe's tobacco harvest rebounded to record levels, with China now purchasing about 40% of the country's annual output.

== See also ==
- Smoking in China
