= Institutional reform of the State Council =

Governmental reforms in China

Since its establishment on September 27, 1954, the State Council of the People's Republic of China has undergone several major institutional reforms.

== Government Administration Council ==
=== Zhou Enlai (1952) ===
The Resolution of the Central People's Government Committee on Adjusting the Central People's Government Institutions was adopted at the 17th meeting of the Central People 's Government Committee on August 7, 1952, and promulgated by the Central People's Government on August 10, 1952:

1. The Central People's Government General Intelligence Bureau and the Central People's Government General Information Bureau were abolished;
2. The Ministry of Foreign Trade of the Central People's Government and the Ministry of Commerce of the Central People's Government were established, and the Ministry of Trade of the Central People's Government was abolished;
3. The First Ministry of Machine Building Industry of the Central People's Government, the Second Ministry of Machine Building Industry of the Central People's Government, the Ministry of Construction Engineering of the Central People's Government, the Ministry of Geology of the Central People's Government, and the Ministry of Food of the Central People's Government were established.

The Resolution of the Central People's Government Committee on the Establishment of Central People's Government Institutions was adopted at the 19th meeting of the Central People's Government Committee on November 15, 1952, and promulgated by the Central People's Government on November 16, 1952:

1. The State Planning Commission of the Central People's Government was established;
2. The Ministry of Higher Education of the Central People's Government was established;
3. The Central People's Government Committee for Eradicating Illiteracy was established;
4. The Central People's Government Sports Commission is established.

== 1954 to 1978 ==
=== Zhou Enlai (1956) ===
On May 12, 1956, the fortieth session of the Standing Committee of the 1st National People's Congress discussed the proposal put forward by Premier Zhou Enlai on adjusting the organizational structure of the State Council and passed the "Resolution of the Standing Committee of the National People's Congress on Adjusting the Organizational Structure of the State Council."

Decision to revoke:

1. Ministry of Heavy Industry
2. The Third Ministry of Machinery Industry
3. Ministry of Local Industry

Decision to establish:

1. State Economic Commission
2. State Technical Committee
3. Ministry of Metallurgical Industry
4. Ministry of Chemical Industry
5. Ministry of Building Materials Industry
6. Ministry of Electric Machinery Manufacturing Industry
7. Ministry of Food Industry
8. Ministry of Fisheries
9. Ministry of Agriculture and Reclamation
10. Ministry of Forestry Industry
11. Ministry of Urban and Rural Construction
12. Ministry of Urban Services.

The State Council approved the abolition of the Urban Construction Bureau and the establishment of the Material Supply Bureau and the Expert Bureau as agencies directly under the State Council. The former Expert Bureau was renamed to the Foreign Experts Bureau.

=== Zhou Enlai (1958) ===
On February 11, 1958, the fifth session of the 1st National People's Congress adopted the "Decision of the Fifth Session of the First National People's Congress on Adjusting the Organizations and Institutions of the State Council" based on the "Proposal on Adjusting the Organizations and Institutions of the State Council" submitted by Premier Zhou Enlai on February 6, 1958.

1. The State Construction Commission was abolished. The work under the State Construction Commission was transferred to the State Planning Commission, the State Economic Commission and the Ministry of Construction.
2. The Department of Commerce was renamed the First Department of Commerce. The Department of Urban Services was renamed the Second Department of Commerce .
3. The First Ministry of Machinery Industry, the Second Ministry of Machinery Industry and the Ministry of Electric Machinery Manufacturing Industry were merged into the First Ministry of Machinery Industry. The Third Ministry of Machinery Industry was renamed the Second Ministry of Machinery Industry.
4. The Ministry of Electric Power Industry and the Ministry of Water Resources were merged into the Ministry of Water Resources and Electric Power.
5. The Ministry of Building Materials Industry, the Ministry of Construction Engineering and the Ministry of Urban Construction were merged into the Ministry of Construction Engineering.
6. The Ministry of Light Industry and the Ministry of Food Industry were merged into the Ministry of Light Industry.
7. The Ministry of Forestry and the Ministry of Forest Industries were merged into the Ministry of Forestry.
8. A Foreign Cultural Liaison Committee was established and the Foreign Cultural Liaison Bureau was abolished.
9. The Ministry of Higher Education and the Ministry of Education were merged into the Ministry of Education.

=== Zhou Enlai (1964) ===
On June 9, 1964, the 119th meeting of the Standing Committee of the Second National People's Congress adopted the "Resolution of the Standing Committee of the National People's Congress on the Establishment of the Foreign Economic Liaison Committee":

- Foreign Economic Liaison Committee was established and the General Administration of Foreign Economic Liaison was abolished.

== Reform and opening up period ==
=== Hua Guofeng (1979) ===
- On March 4, 1979, the State Council approved the report of the State Construction Commission and decided to separate the Equipment Complete Set General Administration under the First Ministry of Machine Building and put the State Machinery Equipment Complete Set General Administration, a State Council-affiliated agency, under the State Construction Commission.
- On October 9, 1979, the State Council approved Yu Qiuli's proposal to separate the General Administration of Instruments and Meters Industry under the First Ministry of Machine Building from the State Administration of Instruments and Meters Industry, and set up the State Instruments and Meters Industry General Administration, which would be managed by the First Ministry of Machine Building.

=== Zhao Ziyang (1982) ===
- On May 4, 1982, the twenty second session of the Standing Committee of the 5th National People's Congress passed a resolution to merge the First Ministry of Machine Building, the Ministry of Agricultural Machinery, the State Administration of Instrument Industry and the State Administration of Complete Machinery and Equipment into the Ministry of Machinery Industry.

=== Li Peng (1988) ===
The first session of the 7th National People's Congress reviewed the State Council's institutional reform plan and State Councilor Song Ping's explanation of the plan, and decided to approve the State Council's institutional reform plan.

=== Li Peng (1993) ===
The first session of the 8th National People's Congress reviewed the State Council's institutional reform plan and the explanation of the plan by Luo Gan, the Secretary-General of the State Council, and decided to approve the State Council's institutional reform plan.

=== Zhu Rongji (1998) ===
On March 10, 1998, the first session of the 9th National People's Congress listened to the explanation of the State Councilor and Secretary-General of the State Council Luo Gan on the State Council's institutional reform plan reviewed the State Council's institutional reform plan, and decided to approve it.

1. 15 ministries and commissions were abolished
  1. Ministry of Electric Power Industry
  2. Ministry of Coal Industry
  3. Ministry of Metallurgical Industry
  4. Ministry of Machinery Industry
  5. Ministry of Electronics Industry
  6. Ministry of Chemical Industry
  7. Ministry of Domestic Trade
  8. Ministry of Posts and Telecommunications
  9. Ministry of Labor
  10. Ministry of Radio, Film and Television
  11. Ministry of Geology and Mineral Resources
  12. Ministry of Forestry
  13. State Sports Commission
  14. Commission of Science, Technology and Industry for National Defense
  15. State Economic System Reform Commission
2. There are 4 new ministries and commissions
  1. Commission for Science, Technology and Industry for National Defense
  2. Ministry of Information Industry
  3. Ministry of Labor and Social Security
  4. Ministry of Land and Resources
3. Three ministries and commissions were renamed
  1. The State Planning Commission was renamed the State Development Planning Commission
  2. The Science and Technology Commission was renamed the Ministry of Science and Technology
  3. The State Education Commission was renamed the Ministry of Education

=== Wen Jiabao (2003) ===
On March 10, 2003, the third plenary meeting of the first session of the 10th National People's Congress adopted the "Decision of the Tenth National People's Congress on the Plan for the Reform of the State Council's Institutions" with an absolute majority . The plan specifically proposed the requirement of coordinating the three powers of "decision-making, execution and supervision".

1. The State-owned Assets Supervision and Administration Commission of the State Council was established.
2. The National Development Planning Commission was reorganized into the National Development and Reform Commission.
3. The China Banking Regulatory Commission was established.
4. The Ministry of Commerce was established.
5. The State Food and Drug Administration was established based on the State Drug Administration, and the State Administration of Work Safety was transferred from the State Economic and Trade Commission to the State Council.
6. The National Family Planning Commission was renamed the National Population and Family Planning Commission.
7. The State Economic and Trade Commission and the Ministry of Foreign Trade and Economic Cooperation were abolished.

=== Wen Jiabao (2008) ===
On March 15, 2008, the fifth plenary meeting of the first session of the 11th National People's Congress adopted the "Decision of the First Session of the Eleventh National People's Congress on the Plan for the Reform of the State Council's Institutions" with 2,744 votes in favor, 117 votes against and 99 abstentions, approving the "Plan for the Reform of the State Council's Institutions":

1. The National Energy Commission was established and put under the National Development and Reform Commission.
2. The Ministry of Industry and Information Technology was established and the Commission for Science, Technology and Industry for National Defense, the Ministry of Information Industry and the National Informatization Leading Group were abolished. The State Administration of Science, Technology and Industry for National Defense was established and put under the Ministry of Industry and Information Technology. The State Tobacco Monopoly Administration was put under the Ministry of Industry and Information Technology.
3. The Ministry of Transport was established, replacing the Ministry of Communications. The Civil Aviation Administration of China was put under the Ministry of Transport.
4. The Ministry of Human Resources and Social Security was established, replacing the Ministry of Personnel and the Ministry of Labor and Social Security. The National Civil Service Bureau was put under the Ministry of Human Resources and Social Security.
5. The Ministry of Environmental Protection was established, replacing the State Environmental Protection Administration.
6. The Ministry of Housing and Urban-Rural Development was established, replacing the Ministry of Construction.
7. The State Food and Drug Administration was established by the Ministry of Health.

=== Li Keqiang (2013) ===
On March 15, 2013, the second plenary meeting of the first session of the 12th National People's Congress adopted by an absolute majority the "Decision of the First Session of the 12th National People's Congress on the Plan for the Reform of the State Council's Institutions and Functions". This reform reduced the number of ministerial-level institutions of the State Council by four, including two constituent departments, while the number of vice-ministerial-level institutions remained unchanged. After the reform, in addition to the General Office of the State Council, the State Council had 25 constituent departments:

1. The National Railway Administration was established under the Ministry of Transport, replacing the Ministry of Railways.The China Railway Corporation was established, which assumed the enterprise responsibilities of the Ministry of Railways.
2. The National Health and Family Planning Commission was established, replacing the Ministry of Health and the National Population and Family Planning Commission. The National Population and Family Planning Commission's responsibilities for researching and formulating population development strategies, plans, and population policies were transferred to the National Development and Reform Commission. The National Administration of Traditional Chinese Medicine was put under the National Health and Family Planning Commission.
3. The State Food and Drug Administration was established, replacing the State Food and Drug Administration and the separate Office of the State Council Food Safety Committee. The General Administration of Quality Supervision, Inspection and Quarantine's responsibilities for food safety supervision and management in the production link, and the State Administration for Industry and Commerce's responsibilities for food safety supervision and management in the circulation link as well as the corresponding food safety supervision and management teams and inspection and testing institutions of the industrial and commercial administration and quality and technical supervision departments were transferred to the State Food and Drug Administration. The State Council Food Safety Committee was retained. The State Food and Drug Administration was also named the Office of the State Council Food Safety Committee.
4. The State Administration of Press, Publication, Radio, Film and Television was established, replacing the State Administration of Radio, Film and Television and the State Administration of Press, Publication and Television.
5. The State Oceanic Administration was reorganized. The State Oceanic Administration and its China Marine Surveillance, the Ministry of Public Security's Border and Coast Guard, the Ministry of Agriculture's China Fisheries Administration, and the General Administration of Customs' Maritime Anti-Smuggling Police will be integrated into a new State Oceanic Administration, which was managed by the Ministry of Land and Resources .
6. The National Energy Administration was reorganized. The responsibilities of the National Energy Administration and the State Electricity Regulatory Commission were integrated, and the National Energy Administration was put under the National Development and Reform Commission.

=== Li Keqiang (2018) ===
On March 17, 2018, the first session of the 13th National People's Congress adopted the "Decision of the First Session of the 13th National People's Congress on the Plan for the Reform of the State Council's Institutions" and approved the "Plan for the Reform of the State Council's Institutions". According to this reform plan, the number of ministerial-level institutions of the State Council was reduced by 8, and the number of vice-ministerial-level institutions was reduced by 7. In addition to the General Office of the State Council, the State Council now had 26 constituent departments. These reforms were part of the deepening the reform of the Party and state institutions.

1. The Ministry of Natural Resources was established, and the Ministry of Land and Resources, State Oceanic Administration and State Bureau of Surveying and Mapping were abolished. The responsibilities of the National Development and Reform Commission for organizing and compiling the main functional area planning, the Ministry of Housing and Urban-Rural Development for urban and rural planning management, the Ministry of Water Resources for water resources survey and title confirmation and registration management, the Ministry of Agriculture for grassland resources survey and title confirmation and registration management, the State Forestry Administration for forest, wetland and other resources survey and title confirmation and registration management, were transferred to the Ministry of Natural Resources.
2. The Ministry of Ecology and Environment was established, replacing the Ministry of Environmental Protection. The responsibilities of the National Development and Reform Commission for addressing climate change and reducing emissions, the Ministry of Land and Resources for supervising and preventing groundwater pollution, the Ministry of Water Resources for compiling water function zoning, setting up sewage outlets and protecting river basin water environments, the Ministry of Agriculture for supervising and guiding agricultural non-point source pollution control, the State Oceanic Administration for protecting the marine environment, and the State Council's South-to-North Water Diversion Project Construction Committee Office for protecting the environment in the South–North Water Transfer Project areas were transferred to the Ministry of Ecology and Environment. The National Nuclear Safety Administration became an external name.
3. The Ministry of Agriculture and Rural Affairs was established, replacing the Ministry of Agriculture. The relevant agricultural investment project management responsibilities of the National Development and Reform Commission, the Ministry of Finance, the Ministry of Land and Resources, and the Ministry of Water Resources and the fishing vessel inspection and supervision and management responsibilities of the Ministry of Agriculture to the Ministry of Transport were transferred to the Ministry of Agriculture and Rural Affairs.
4. The Ministry of Culture and Tourism was established, replacing the Ministry of Culture and the China National Tourism Administration.
5. The National Health Commission was established, replacing the National Health and Family Planning Commission and the Office of the Leading Group for Deepening Reform of the Medical and Health System of the State Council. The responsibilities of the National Health and Family Planning Commission, the Office of the Leading Group for Deepening Reform of the Medical and Health System of the State Council, the Office of the National Working Committee on Aging, the Ministry of Industry and Information Technology's role in fulfilling the WHO Framework Convention on Tobacco Control, and the State Administration of Work Safety's occupational safety and health supervision and management were transferred to the National Health Commission. The China Association of Geriatrics was transferred from the Ministry of Civil Affairs to the NHC. The National Working Committee on Aging and the National Administration of Traditional Chinese Medicine were transferred to the NHC.
6. The Ministry of Veterans Affairs was established. The responsibilities of the Ministry of Civil Affairs for veterans' preferential treatment and resettlement, the Ministry of Human Resources and Social Security for the resettlement of retired officers, and the relevant responsibilities of the Central Military Commission's Political Work Department and the Logistic Support Department were transferred to the Ministry of Veterans Affairs.
7. The Ministry of Emergency Management was established and the State Administration of Work Safety was abolished. The emergency management responsibilities of the General Office of the State Council, the fire management responsibilities of the Ministry of Public Security, the disaster relief responsibilities of the Ministry of Civil Affairs, the geological disaster prevention and control of the Ministry of Land and Resources, the flood and drought disaster prevention and control of the Ministry of Water Resources, the grassland fire prevention of the Ministry of Agriculture, the forest fire prevention-related responsibilities of the State Forestry Administration, the earthquake emergency rescue responsibilities of the China Earthquake Administration, and the responsibilities of the State Flood Control and Drought Relief Headquarters, the National Disaster Reduction Committee, the State Council Earthquake Relief Headquarters, and the National Forest Fire Prevention Headquarters were transferred to the Ministry of Emergency Management. The China Earthquake Administration and the State Administration of Coal Mine Safety was put under the Ministry.
8. The State Administration of Foreign Experts Affairs was merged into the Ministry of Science and Technology. The names of the former agency were retained by the Ministry as external names under the "one institution with two names".
9. The Legislative Affairs Office was merged into the Ministry of Justice.
10. The State Council Three Gorges Project Construction Committee and its office, the State Council South-to-North Water Diversion Project Construction Committee and its office were merged into the Ministry of Water Resources.
11. The duties of the National Development and Reform Commission's major project inspections, the Ministry of Finance's supervision and inspection of the implementation of the central budget and other fiscal revenue and expenditure, the State-owned Assets Supervision and Administration Commission of the State Council's economic responsibility audit of state-owned enterprise leaders and the supervisory board of key state-owned enterprises were transferred to the National Audit Office. Supervisory boards of key state-owned enterprises were abolished.
12. The Ministry of Supervision and the National Bureau of Corruption Prevention were merged into the National Supervisory Commission.
13. The State Administration for Market Regulation was established and the State Administration for Industry and Commerce, the General Administration of Quality Supervision, Inspection and Quarantine, and the State Food and Drug Administration were abolished. The responsibilities of the National Development and Reform Commission regarding price supervision and inspection and anti-monopoly law enforcement, the Ministry of Commerce regarding anti-monopoly law enforcement for concentration of operators, and the Office of the State Council Anti-Monopoly Commission were transferred to the State Administration for Market Regulation. The State Drug Administration was replaced with the National Medical Products Administration, which was put under the State Administration for Market Regulation. The entry-exit inspection and quarantine management responsibilities and teams of the General Administration of Quality Supervision, Inspection and Quarantine were transferred to the General Administration of Customs. The State Council Food Safety Committee and the State Council Anti-Monopoly Committee were retained. The National Certification and Accreditation Administration and the Standardization Administration of China were merged to the State Administration for Market Regulation were retained by the Ministry as external names under the "one institution with two names".
14. The National Radio and Television Administration was established, replacing the State Administration of Press, Publication, Radio, Film and Television.
15. The China Media Group was established under the leadership of the Publicity Department. The China Central Television (China Global Television Network), China National Radio, and China Radio International were put under the CMG. The original call signs were retained internally, and the external call sign was unified as "Voice of China".
16. The China Banking and Insurance Regulatory Commission was established and the China Banking Regulatory Commission and the China Insurance Regulatory Commission were abolished.
17. The China International Development Cooperation Agency was established. The Ministry of Commerce's foreign aid responsibilities and the Ministry of Foreign Affairs' foreign aid coordination responsibilities were transferred to the agency.
18. The National Healthcare Security Administration was established. The basic medical insurance and maternity insurance responsibilities of urban employees and urban residents of the Ministry of Human Resources and Social Security, the new rural cooperative medical responsibilities of the National Health and Family Planning Commission, the drug and medical service price management responsibilities of the National Development and Reform Commission, and the medical assistance responsibilities of the Ministry of Civil Affairs were transferred to the administration.
19. The National Food and Strategic Reserves Administration was established and the State Grain Bureau was abolished. The responsibilities of the National Development and Reform Commission for organizing and implementing the collection, storage, rotation and management of national strategic materials, and managing national grain, cotton and sugar reserves, as well as the Ministry of Civil Affairs, the Ministry of Commerce, the National Energy Administration and other departments' responsibilities for organizing and implementing the collection, storage, rotation and daily management of strategic and emergency reserve materials were transferred to the administration.
20. The National Immigration Administration was established under the Ministry of Public Security. The entry and exit management and border inspection responsibilities of the Ministry of Public Security were transferred to the administration, which established and improved a visa management coordination mechanism.
21. The National Forestry and Grassland Administration was established, replacing the State Forestry Administration. The grassland supervision and management responsibilities of the Ministry of Agriculture, and the management responsibilities of the Ministry of Land and Resources, the Ministry of Housing and Urban-Rural Development, the Ministry of Water Resources, the Ministry of Agriculture, the State Oceanic Administration and other departments for nature reserves, scenic spots, natural heritage, geological parks, etc. were transferred to the administration.
22. The China National Intellectual Property Administration was put under the State Administration for Market Regulation. The trademark management responsibilities of the State Administration for Industry and Commerce, and the geographical indication management responsibilities of the General Administration of Quality Supervision, Inspection and Quarantine were transferred to the State Administration for Market Regulation.
23. The National Council for Social Security Fund was transferred from the State Council to the Ministry of Finance instead of the State Council and assumed the main responsibility for the safety and value preservation and appreciation of the fund.
24. The national and local tax agencies at the provincial level and below were merged. After the merger, a dual leadership and management system was implemented with the State Administration of Taxation as the main body and the province-level people's governments.

=== Li Qiang (2023) ===
1. The Ministry of Science and Technology was reorganized, and its responsibilities for organizing and formulating science and technology plans and policies to promote agricultural and rural development, and guiding rural scientific and technological progress were transferred to the Ministry of Agriculture and Rural Affairs. The Ministry of Science and Technology's responsibilities for organizing and formulating science and technology plans and policies to promote social development were assigned to the National Development and Reform Commission, the Ministry of Ecology and Environment, the National Health Commission and other departments. The Ministry of Science and Technology's responsibilities for organizing and formulating high-tech development and industrialization plans and policies, guiding the construction of science and technology parks such as national independent innovation demonstration zones and national high-tech industrial development zones, and guiding the development of science and technology services, technology markets, and science and technology intermediary organizations were transferred to the Ministry of Industry and Information Technology. The Ministry of Science and Technology's responsibilities for introducing foreign intelligence were transferred to the Ministry of Human Resources and Social Security, and the Ministry of Human Resources and Social Security was given the name of the State Administration of Foreign Experts Affairs. The China Rural Technology Development Center under the Ministry of Science and Technology was transferred to the Ministry of Agriculture and Rural Affairs, the China Biotechnology Development Center to the National Health Commission, and the China 21st Century Agenda Management Center and the High Technology Research and Development Center of the Ministry of Science and Technology to the National Natural Science Foundation of China.
2. The National Financial Regulatory Administration was established.
3. Deepening the reform of local financial regulatory system.
4. The China Securities Regulatory Commission was adjusted to be an agency directly under the State Council.
5. Coordinated promotion of the reform of the People's Bank of China branches.
6. Improve the management system of state-owned financial capital.
7. Strengthen unified and standardized management of financial management department staff.
8. The National Data Administration was established under the National Development and Reform Commission. The responsibilities of the Office of the Central Cyberspace Affairs Commission for researching and formulating plans for the construction of Digital China, coordinating the promotion of informatization of public services and social governance, coordinating the promotion of smart city construction, coordinating the development, utilization and sharing of important national information resources, and promoting the interconnection and interoperability of information resources across industries and departments was transferred to the National Data Bureau. The responsibilities of the National Development and Reform Commission for coordinating the promotion of digital economic development, organizing and implementing the national big data strategy, promoting the construction of basic systems for data elements, and promoting the layout and construction of digital infrastructure was transferred to the National Data Bureau.
9. Optimizing the responsibilities of the Ministry of Agriculture and Rural Affairs.
10. Improve the work system for the elderly.
11. Improve the intellectual property management system.
12. The National Public Complaints and Proposals Administration was restructured into an agency directly under the State Council.
13. The staffing of the central state organs were streamlined. The staffing of each department of the central state organs were uniformly reduced by 5%. The recovered staff were mainly used to strengthen key areas and important tasks.
