= Deepening the reform of the Party and state institutions =

2018 institutional reforms in China

Deepening the reform of the Party and state institutions (Chinese: 深化党和国家机构改革; pinyin: Shēnhuà dǎng hé guójiā jīgòu gǎigé) was a large-scale reform of the institutions of the Chinese Communist Party (CCP) and the People's Republic of China (PRC) that was initiated by the 19th CCP Central Committee in 2018. The biggest focus of this reform was to "perfect the system of upholding the overall leadership of the Party", establishing the National Supervisory Commission, and make changes to State Council, with the actual responsibilities of some agencies assumed by the Party organizations. In addition, the organizational structure and functions of the State Council changed greatly, with the national and local tax agencies below the provincial level merged, the administrative law enforcement team integrated, and the armed police streamlined. The institutional reform of the central and state organs were implemented by the end of 2018, and the reform of local institutions was completed by the end of March 2019.

== Background ==
From February 26 to 28, 2018, the 3rd plenary session of the 19th CCP Central Committee was held in Beijing. The session reviewed and approved the "Decision of the CPC Central Committee on Deepening the Reform of Party and State Institutions" and the "Plan for Deepening the Reform of Party and State Institutions", and stressed that "in the face of new requirements from the new era and new tasks, the establishment and function allocation of party and state institutions are not yet fully adapted to the requirements of promoting the 'five-in-one' overall layout and the strategic layout of four comprehensives, and are not yet fully adapted to the requirements of realizing the modernization of the national governance system and governance capacity." The plenary session stated that that "deepening the reform of party and state institutions is a profound change in promoting the modernization of the national governance system and governance capacity", and the goal is to "fully improve the national governance capacity and governance level", and the key is to "ensure full coverage of the party's leadership and ensure that the party's leadership is stronger and more powerful", continuing by saying that "we should straighten out the relationship between the responsibilities of the central and local governments and give better play to the initiative of both the central and local governments". This institutional reform is much broader, deeper and more influential than the previous institutional reforms limited to the State Council system and the government system.

In March 2018, the Central Committee issued the "Plan for Deepening the Reform of Party and State Institutions", which required that "the reform of the central and state institutions should be fully implemented by the end of 2018. The provincial-level party and government institutional reform plan should be submitted to the CCP Central Committee for approval by the end of September 2018, and the institutional adjustments should be basically completed by the end of 2018. The reform of party and government institutions below the provincial level should be led by the provincial party committee and reported to the CCP Central Committee for record by the end of 2018. All local institutional reform tasks should be basically completed by the end of March 2019."

== Content of the decisions ==
=== Improve the system of upholding the Party's overall leadership ===
"Strengthening the Party's leadership over all areas and aspects of work is the primary task of deepening the reform of the Party and state institutions." Improving the system of upholding the Party's overall leadership requires:

1. Establish and improve the Party's leadership system and mechanism for major work.
2. Strengthen the leadership of the Party organization among organizations at the same level.
3. Better play the role of the party's functional departments.
4. Coordinate the establishment of party and government institutions.
5. Promote the reform of the party's disciplinary inspection system and the national supervision system.

=== Optimize the establishment and function allocation of government agencies ===
"Transforming government functions is an important task in deepening the reform of the Party and state institutions." Optimizing the establishment and function allocation of government institutions requires:

1. Rationally allocate the functions of macro-management departments.
2. Deepen the reform of streamlining administration and delegating power.
3. Improve the market supervision and law enforcement system.
4. Reform the natural resources and ecological environment management system.
5. Improve the public service management system.
6. Strengthen supervision during and after the event.
7. Improve administrative efficiency.

=== Coordinate the reform of party, government, military and mass organizations ===
"Coordinating the reform of the Party, government, military and mass organizations is an inevitable requirement for strengthening the Party's centralized and unified leadership and achieving optimized, coordinated and efficient functions of organizations." Coordinating the reform of the Party, government, military and mass organizations requires:

1. Improve the layout of party and government institutions.
2. Deepen the reform of the National People's Congress, the Chinese People's Political Consultative Conference and the judicial institutions.
3. Deepen the reform of mass organizations.
4. Promote the reform of social organizations.
5. Accelerate the reform of public institutions .
6. Deepen cross-military and local reforms.

=== Reasonable establishment of local institutions ===
"Coordinate and optimize the establishment and function allocation of local institutions, and build a work system that runs smoothly, is full of vitality, and is strictly enforced from the central to the local level." Reasonable establishment of local institutions requires:

1. Ensure centralized and unified leadership.
2. Grant more autonomy to provincial and lower-level institutions.
3. Build a simple and efficient grassroots management system.
4. Standardize the vertical management system and the local hierarchical management system.

=== Promoting the legalization of institutional establishment ===
"The legalization of institutional establishment is an important guarantee for deepening the reform of the Party and state institutions." Promoting the legalization of institutional establishment requires:

1. Improve the laws and regulations of Party and state institutions.
2. Strengthen the rigid constraints on institutional staffing management.
3. Increase the intensity of investigation and punishment of violations of discipline and law in organizational structure.

== Specific measures ==
=== Central Committee of the Chinese Communist Party ===
1. The National Supervisory Commission was established. The Ministry of Supervision, the National Bureau of Corruption Prevention, and the Supreme People's Procuratorate's General Administration of Anti-Corruption and Bribery were merged into the new commission.
2. The Central Comprehensive Law-based Governance Commission was established, with its office located in the Ministry of Justice.
3. The Central Auditing Commission was established as the decision-making and coordination body of the Party Central Committee, with its office located in the National Audit Office.
4. The Central Leading Group for Comprehensively Deepening Reform, the Central Leading Group for Cybersecurity and Informatization, the Central Leading Group for Finance and Economics, and the Central Leading Group for Foreign Affairs were changed to the Central Comprehensively Deepening Reform Commission, the Central Cyberspace Affairs Commission, the Central Financial and Economic Affairs Commission, and the Central Foreign Affairs Commission.
5. The Central Education Work Leading Group was established with its secretariat located in the Ministry of Education.
6. The Working Committee of Central and State Organs was established and the Work Committee for Offices Directly under the Central Committee and the State Organs Work Committee were abolished.
7. The National Academy of Governance was merged into the Central Party School and became one institution with two names.
8. The Institute of Party History and Literature was established and the Party History Research Center, Party Documents Research Office, and the Compilation and Translation Bureau were abolished.
9. The Office of the Central Institutional Organization Commission was put under the management of the Organization Department.
10. The State Administration of Civil Service was merged into the Organization Department and became a one institution with two names.
11. The news and publication management responsibilities of the State Administration of Press, Publication, Radio, Film and Television was transferred to the Publicity Department, which also uses the name of the National Press and Publication Administration and the National Copyright Administration as a one institution with two names.
12. The film management responsibilities of the State Administration of Press, Publication, Radio, Film and Television were transferred to the Publicity Department, which now started to use the name of the China Film Administration.
13. The National Ethnic Affairs Commission, which remained a component department of the State Council, was put under the leadership of the United Front Work Department.
14. The State Administration for Religious Affairs was merged into the United Front Work Department. The names of the former agency were retained by the UFWD as external names under the "one institution with two names".
15. The Overseas Chinese Affairs Office was merged into the United Front Work Department. The names of the former agency were retained by the UFWD as external names under the "one institution with two names".
16. The National Computer Network and Information Security Management Center was transferred from the Ministry of Industry and Information Technology to the Office of the Central Cyberspace Affairs Commission.
17. The central leading group for safeguarding maritime rights and interests was abolished, with its duties being taken by the Central Foreign Affairs Commission and its office. An office for safeguarding maritime rights and interests was set up within the Office of the Central Foreign Affairs Commission.
18. The Central Public Security Comprehensive Management Commission and its office were abolished, with its duties being taken by the Central Political and Legal Affairs Commission.
19. The Central Leading Group for Maintaining Stability and its office were abolished, with its duties being taken by the Central Political and Legal Affairs Commission.
20. The responsibilities of the Central Leading Group for Preventing and Handling Cults and its Office were transferred to the Central Political and Legal Affairs Commission and the Ministry of Public Security.

=== National People's Congress ===
1. The Social Development Affairs Committee of the National People's Congress was established.
2. The Internal and Judicial Affairs Committee was renamed to the Supervisory and Judicial Affairs Committee.
3. The Law Committee was renamed to the Constitution and Law Committee.

=== State Council ===
1. The Ministry of Natural Resources was established, and the Ministry of Land and Resources, State Oceanic Administration and State Bureau of Surveying and Mapping were abolished. The responsibilities of the National Development and Reform Commission for organizing and compiling the main functional area planning, the Ministry of Housing and Urban-Rural Development for urban and rural planning management, the Ministry of Water Resources for water resources survey and title confirmation and registration management, the Ministry of Agriculture for grassland resources survey and title confirmation and registration management, the State Forestry Administration for forest, wetland and other resources survey and title confirmation and registration management, were transferred to the Ministry of Natural Resources.
2. The Ministry of Ecology and Environment was established, replacing the Ministry of Environmental Protection. The responsibilities of the National Development and Reform Commission for addressing climate change and reducing emissions, the Ministry of Land and Resources for supervising and preventing groundwater pollution, the Ministry of Water Resources for compiling water function zoning, setting up sewage outlets and protecting river basin water environments, the Ministry of Agriculture for supervising and guiding agricultural non-point source pollution control, the State Oceanic Administration for protecting the marine environment, and the State Council's South-to-North Water Diversion Project Construction Committee Office for protecting the environment in the South–North Water Transfer Project areas were transferred to the Ministry of Ecology and Environment. The National Nuclear Safety Administration became an external name.
3. The Ministry of Agriculture and Rural Affairs was established, replacing the Ministry of Agriculture. The relevant agricultural investment project management responsibilities of the National Development and Reform Commission, the Ministry of Finance, the Ministry of Land and Resources, and the Ministry of Water Resources and the fishing vessel inspection and supervision and management responsibilities of the Ministry of Agriculture to the Ministry of Transport were transferred to the Ministry of Agriculture and Rural Affairs.
4. The Ministry of Culture and Tourism was established, replacing the Ministry of Culture and the China National Tourism Administration.
5. The National Health Commission was established, replacing the National Health and Family Planning Commission and the Office of the Leading Group for Deepening Reform of the Medical and Health System of the State Council. The responsibilities of the National Health and Family Planning Commission, the Office of the Leading Group for Deepening Reform of the Medical and Health System of the State Council, the Office of the National Working Committee on Aging, the Ministry of Industry and Information Technology's role in fulfilling the WHO Framework Convention on Tobacco Control, and the State Administration of Work Safety's occupational safety and health supervision and management were transferred to the National Health Commission. The China Association of Geriatrics was transferred from the Ministry of Civil Affairs to the NHC. The National Working Committee on Aging and the National Administration of Traditional Chinese Medicine were transferred to the NHC.
6. The Ministry of Veterans Affairs was established. The responsibilities of the Ministry of Civil Affairs for veterans' preferential treatment and resettlement, the Ministry of Human Resources and Social Security for the resettlement of retired officers, and the relevant responsibilities of the Central Military Commission's Political Work Department and the Logistic Support Department were transferred to the Ministry of Veterans Affairs.
7. The Ministry of Emergency Management was established and the State Administration of Work Safety was abolished. The emergency management responsibilities of the General Office of the State Council, the fire management responsibilities of the Ministry of Public Security, the disaster relief responsibilities of the Ministry of Civil Affairs, the geological disaster prevention and control of the Ministry of Land and Resources, the flood and drought disaster prevention and control of the Ministry of Water Resources, the grassland fire prevention of the Ministry of Agriculture, the forest fire prevention-related responsibilities of the State Forestry Administration, the earthquake emergency rescue responsibilities of the China Earthquake Administration, and the responsibilities of the State Flood Control and Drought Relief Headquarters, the National Disaster Reduction Committee, the State Council Earthquake Relief Headquarters, and the National Forest Fire Prevention Headquarters were transferred to the Ministry of Emergency Management. The China Earthquake Administration and the State Administration of Coal Mine Safety was put under the Ministry.
8. The State Administration of Foreign Experts Affairs was merged into the Ministry of Science and Technology. The names of the former agency were retained by the Ministry as external names under the "one institution with two names".
9. The Legislative Affairs Office was merged into the Ministry of Justice.
10. The State Council Three Gorges Project Construction Committee and its office, the State Council South-to-North Water Diversion Project Construction Committee and its office were merged into the Ministry of Water Resources.
11. The duties of the National Development and Reform Commission's major project inspections, the Ministry of Finance's supervision and inspection of the implementation of the central budget and other fiscal revenue and expenditure, the State-owned Assets Supervision and Administration Commission of the State Council's economic responsibility audit of state-owned enterprise leaders and the supervisory board of key state-owned enterprises were transferred to the National Audit Office. Supervisory boards of key state-owned enterprises were abolished.
12. The Ministry of Supervision and the National Bureau of Corruption Prevention were merged into the National Supervisory Commission.
13. The State Administration for Market Regulation was established and the State Administration for Industry and Commerce, the General Administration of Quality Supervision, Inspection and Quarantine, and the State Food and Drug Administration were abolished. The responsibilities of the National Development and Reform Commission regarding price supervision and inspection and anti-monopoly law enforcement, the Ministry of Commerce regarding anti-monopoly law enforcement for concentration of operators, and the Office of the State Council Anti-Monopoly Commission were transferred to the State Administration for Market Regulation. The State Drug Administration was replaced with the National Medical Products Administration, which was put under the State Administration for Market Regulation. The entry-exit inspection and quarantine management responsibilities and teams of the General Administration of Quality Supervision, Inspection and Quarantine were transferred to the General Administration of Customs. The State Council Food Safety Committee and the State Council Anti-Monopoly Committee were retained. The National Certification and Accreditation Administration and the Standardization Administration of China were merged to the State Administration for Market Regulation were retained by the Ministry as external names under the "one institution with two names".
14. The National Radio and Television Administration was established, replacing the State Administration of Press, Publication, Radio, Film and Television.
15. The China Media Group was established under the leadership of the Publicity Department. The China Central Television (China Global Television Network), China National Radio, and China Radio International were put under the CMG. The original call signs were retained internally, and the external call sign was unified as "Voice of China".
16. The China Banking and Insurance Regulatory Commission was established and the China Banking Regulatory Commission and the China Insurance Regulatory Commission were abolished.
17. The China International Development Cooperation Agency was established. The Ministry of Commerce's foreign aid responsibilities and the Ministry of Foreign Affairs' foreign aid coordination responsibilities were transferred to the agency.
18. The National Healthcare Security Administration was established. The basic medical insurance and maternity insurance responsibilities of urban employees and urban residents of the Ministry of Human Resources and Social Security, the new rural cooperative medical responsibilities of the National Health and Family Planning Commission, the drug and medical service price management responsibilities of the National Development and Reform Commission, and the medical assistance responsibilities of the Ministry of Civil Affairs were transferred to the administration.
19. The National Food and Strategic Reserves Administration was established and the State Grain Bureau was abolished. The responsibilities of the National Development and Reform Commission for organizing and implementing the collection, storage, rotation and management of national strategic materials, and managing national grain, cotton and sugar reserves, as well as the Ministry of Civil Affairs, the Ministry of Commerce, the National Energy Administration and other departments' responsibilities for organizing and implementing the collection, storage, rotation and daily management of strategic and emergency reserve materials were transferred to the administration.
20. The National Immigration Administration was established under the Ministry of Public Security. The entry and exit management and border inspection responsibilities of the Ministry of Public Security were transferred to the administration, which established and improved a visa management coordination mechanism.
21. The National Forestry and Grassland Administration was established, replacing the State Forestry Administration. The grassland supervision and management responsibilities of the Ministry of Agriculture, and the management responsibilities of the Ministry of Land and Resources, the Ministry of Housing and Urban-Rural Development, the Ministry of Water Resources, the Ministry of Agriculture, the State Oceanic Administration and other departments for nature reserves, scenic spots, natural heritage, geological parks, etc. were transferred to the administration.
22. The China National Intellectual Property Administration was put under the State Administration for Market Regulation. The trademark management responsibilities of the State Administration for Industry and Commerce, and the geographical indication management responsibilities of the General Administration of Quality Supervision, Inspection and Quarantine were transferred to the State Administration for Market Regulation.
23. The National Council for Social Security Fund was transferred from the State Council to the Ministry of Finance instead of the State Council and assumed the main responsibility for the safety and value preservation and appreciation of the fund.
24. The national and local tax agencies at the provincial level and below were merged. After the merger, a dual leadership and management system was implemented with the State Administration of Taxation as the main body and the province-level people's governments.

=== Chinese People's Political Consultative Conference ===
1. The Committee for Agriculture and Rural Affairs was established.
2. The History and Study Committee was renamed to the Committee on Culture, Historical Data and Studies.
3. The Committee of Education, Science, Culture, Health and Sports was renamed to the Committee of Education, Science, Health and Sports.

=== Administrative law enforcement system ===
1. A comprehensive market supervision law enforcement team was established. The law enforcement responsibilities and teams of industry and commerce, quality inspection, food, medicine, price, trademark, patent, etc., were integrated under the guidance of the State Administration for Market Regulation. The law enforcement of drug sales and other behaviors were uniformly undertaken by the comprehensive market supervision law enforcement team of cities and counties.
2. A comprehensive law enforcement team for ecological and environmental protection was integrated and established. The pollution prevention and ecological protection law enforcement responsibilities and teams of the environmental protection and land, agriculture, water conservancy, ocean and other departments, and implement unified ecological and environmental protection law enforcement were integrated under the guidance of the Ministry of Ecology and Environment.
3. A comprehensive law enforcement team for the cultural market was integrated and established. The law enforcement responsibilities and teams of the tourism market into the comprehensive law enforcement team of the cultural market was integrated, and uniformly exercised administrative law enforcement responsibilities for the cultural, cultural relics, publishing, radio and television, film, and tourism markets with the guidance by the Ministry of Culture and Tourism.
4. A comprehensive law enforcement team for transportation was integrated and established. The law enforcement responsibilities and teams of road administration, transportation administration and other departments within the transportation system, and implement unified law enforcement were integrated with the guidance of the Ministry of Transport.
5. A comprehensive agricultural law enforcement team was integrated and established. The law enforcement teams for veterinary medicine, pig slaughter, seeds, fertilizers, pesticides, agricultural machinery, and agricultural product quality within the agricultural system to implement unified law enforcement was integrated with the guidance of the Ministry of Agriculture and Rural Affairs.

=== Cross-military reforms ===
1. The public security border defense forces were no longer listed as part of the People's Armed Police. All of them were withdrawn from active service and transferred to the public security organs. In conjunction with the newly established National Immigration Administration, adjustments and integration were made. All active personnel were transferred to the People's Police.
2. The public security fire brigade was no longer listed as part of the People's Armed Police, and all of them were withdrawn from active service. All active-duty organizations were converted into administrative organizations and assigned to the Ministry of Emergency Management.
3. The public security guard forces were no longer listed as part of the People's Armed Police, and were all be withdrawn from active service. The system in which the guard bureau (department) is managed by the public security organs at the same level remained unchanged, and all active-duty establishments were transferred to the people's police establishment.
4. The maritime police force under the leadership and management of the State Oceanic Administration (China Coast Guard) was transferred to the People's Armed Police.
5. The People's Armed Police no longer led and managed the Armed Police Gold, Forestry, and Hydropower Forces In accordance with the method of first transfer and then reorganization, the Armed Police Gold, Forestry, and Hydropower Forces were transferred to the functional departments of the state, and the officers and soldiers were collectively transferred to non-active professional teams. The Armed Police Gold Force was incorporated into the Ministry of Natural Resources, and the active force establishment was converted to a fiscal subsidy enterprise establishment. Some of the original corporate functions was transferred to the China National Gold Corporation. The active force establishment of the Armed Police Forest Force was incorporated into the Ministry of Emergency Management. After being converted into a non-active professional team, the Armed Police Hydropower Force continued to use the name of China Aneng Construction Corporation and was transferred to the State-owned Assets Supervision and Administration Commission of the State Council.
6. The People's Armed Police no longer undertook customs duty tasks. The troops involved in customs duty were withdrawn and returned to the armed police force. The customs system was integrated with the inspection and quarantine system, increased internal potential, accepted some retired officers and soldiers through the approval of military transfer establishment, and was tasked with solving the problem by purchasing services and hiring security personnel.

=== Mass organizations ===
- Improve the system of unified leadership of mass organizations by Party committees, focus on maintaining and enhancing their political nature, progressiveness, and mass character, strengthen our awareness of problems, promote reform with greater efforts and more practical measures, and strive to solve problems such as "bureaucratization, administrativeization, aristocratization, and entertainmentization", and build mass organizations that are more vibrant and stronger.
- Adhere to the Party's leadership over mass organizations, find the correct points of convergence and focus, implement a people-centered work orientation, and enhance the attractiveness and influence of mass organizations.

=== Local institutions ===
- Adhere to strengthening the party's overall leadership, adhere to provincial, municipal and county coordination, and party, government and mass organization coordination. Based on the main responsibilities of party committees and governments at all levels, local institutions adjusted and set up institutions, straightened out the relationship between rights and responsibilities, and organized the implementation of reform plans after they are approved in accordance with procedures.
- Efforts were made to improve the system and mechanism for maintaining the authority of the CCP Central Committee and its centralized and unified leadership. The functions of the institutions at the provincial, municipal and county levels related to the centralized and unified leadership of the CCP Central Committee and the unified national legal system, unified government orders and unified markets should basically correspond. More autonomy were tasked to be given to provincial and lower-level institutions, and the characteristics of responsibilities at different levels were tasked be highlighted. Localities were tasked allowed to set up institutions and allocate functions according to local conditions within the prescribed limits according to the actual economic and social development of their regions. The establishment of party, government and mass organizations were tasked to be coordinated, and the merger or joint office of party and government organs with similar functions were tasked to be explored in provinces, cities and counties. Cities and counties were tasked to increase the efforts to merge or joint office party and government organs. Drawing on the experience of the pilot reform of the administrative management system in economically developed towns, adapting to the work characteristics and convenient service needs of streets and towns, and building a simple and efficient grassroots management system.
- Strengthen the quota management of party and government agencies at all levels, and unify the quota calculation of local party committee agencies and government agencies at the same level. Institutions that undertake administrative functions were included in the quota management of local party and government agencies. The quota of provincial party and government agencies were proved and managed by the CCP Central Committee. The quota of municipal and county party and government agencies were strictly managed by the provincial party committee.
- Strengthen the rigid constraints on the management of institutional establishment, adhere to the total control, and strictly prohibit the recruitment of personnel beyond the establishment quota, the establishment of institutions beyond the limit, and the appointment of leading cadres beyond the number of posts. Integrate and standardize the establishment, and increase the coordination and allocation of establishment between departments and regions.
