= CGRM =

CGMR can refer to:

- Commandant General Royal Marines, the professional head of the Royal Marines.
- Captain General Royal Marines, the ceremonial head of the Royal Marines.

== See also ==
- CGRMC - China Grain Reserve Management Corporation
- Spitfire F Mk.IIa P8088 (G-CGRM) a restored surviving Supermarine Spitfire
- CGMR
