= National Cotton and Cotton Yarn Trading Center =

National trading center in China

The National Cotton and Cotton Yarn Trading Center (Chinese: 国家级棉花棉纱交易中心), created in December 2023, is a national trading center located in Ürümqi, Xinjiang, China.

== Context ==
Xinjiang serves as China's primary cotton production and high-quality cotton yarn manufacturing hub, leveraging its abundant cotton resources and geographical advantages, thus establishing itself as a prominent center for the textile and clothing industry in western China. In 2022, Xinjiang's cotton cultivation area was 37.45 million mu, representing 83.2% of China's total cotton planting area. The cotton output reached 5.391 million tons, constituting 90.2% of China's total cotton production and 21% of global cotton production. Machine harvesting accounted for 21% of the total output. The entire cotton production is 5.391 million tons, representing 90.2% of China's total cotton output and 21% of global cotton production, with a cotton machine picking rate of 85.6%. Xinjiang's total cotton production has consistently exceeded 5 million tons for five consecutive years, with its area, yield, total output, and commodity transfer volume ranking first in China for 29 consecutive years. Xinjiang's spinning capacity has attained 22.15 million spindles, representing approximately 20% of China's total spinning capability.

On December 18, 2023, the inauguration ceremony for the National Cotton and Cotton Yarn Trading Center took place in Ürümqi, Xinjiang, featuring the principal leaders of the CCP Xinjiang Uygur Autonomous Region Committee, the People's Government of Xinjiang Uygur Autonomous Region, the Xinjiang Production and Construction Corps, and the All-China Federation of Supply and Marketing Cooperatives unveiling the center's plaque. The newly constructed national cotton and cotton yarn trading center offers trading of cotton and cotton yarn products, industrial services, and additional value-added services, including spot listing transactions, unilateral spot bidding transactions, negotiation transactions, and other operations.

== See also ==
- Xinjiang cotton industry
- Xinjiang Free-Trade Zone
- China National Cotton Reserves Corporation
- China Cotton Association
