= CNCotton =

The CNCotton (Chinese: 中国棉花网), or CNCotton.com, established in June 1999 and operating under the China Cotton Storage Information Center Co., Ltd. (Chinese: 中储棉花信息中心有限公司), is a non-profit website dedicated to providing professional information services related to cotton.

== Management ==
The management was transferred in January 2004 to China Reserve Cotton Information Center Ltd, a wholly owned subsidiary of China Cotton Reserve Management, formally registered in January 2004 with the State Administration for Industry and Commerce. It is a state-funded, non-profit organization specializing in cotton information services.

== Content ==
The website offers comprehensive cotton industry information and network technology services to various sectors in China, primarily disseminating data on Chinese and international cotton futures, spot prices, cotton textiles, textile chemical fiber prices, cotton price indices, industry statistics, and market trends.

== See also ==
- China Cotton Association
- China National Cotton Reserves Corporation
