= China Association for Non-Profit Organization =

The China Association for Non-Profit Organization (CANPO, Chinese: 中国社会组织促进会) is a national social entity overseen by the Ministry of Civil Affairs of the People's Republic of China. It comprises unit members from social organizations, foundations, privately run non-enterprises, and individual members committed to the advancement of social organizations and who have contributed to their development. It was founded on January 8, 2008, under the oversight of the Ministry of Civil Affairs.

== History ==
The China Association for the Promotion of Social Organizations was established on January 8, 2008. On January 13, the inaugural conference and the first general assembly of the China Association for the Promotion of Social Organizations took place at the Great Hall of the People. On November 27, 2019, the CANPO convened its third council in Beijing.
