= Welfare in China =

Welfare in the People's Republic of China is linked to the hukou system of household registration. Those holding non-agricultural hukou status have access to a number of programs provided by the government, such as healthcare, employment, retirement pensions, housing, and education. While rural residents traditionally were expected to provide for themselves, in 2014, the Chinese Communist Party announced reforms aimed at providing rural citizens access to historically urban social programs.

Social assistance includes both monetary and health care benefits. Poverty reduction programs exist in parallel to social assistance; poverty reduction programs have separate administration and budgets.

== Administration ==
Administration of social assistance in China is decentralized. The Ministry of Civil Affairs has overall responsibility for social assistance at the central level of government. The Ministry of Human Resources and Social Security (MOHRSS) Department of Pensions and Rural Social Insurance has general supervision over pension programs. The National Health Commission supervises medical providers. The National Healthcare Security Administration guides local governments on issues related to medical insurance and sickness and maternity insurance.

== History ==
In the 1950s, China implemented social assistance for the Three Withouts (三无; sanwu), meaning without livelihood source, without the ability to work, and without family support. The Five Guarantee were also implemented in rural areas in the 1950s as a poverty reduction mechanism.

After Reform and Opening Up, China introduced other social assistance programs. These include dibao, a Minimum Livelihood Guarantee, which was implemented in Shanghai in 1993, expanded nationwide to urban areas by 1999, and expanded into rural regions in 2007.

Welfare reforms since the late 1990s have included unemployment insurance, medical insurance, workers' compensation insurance, maternity benefits, communal pension funds, individual pension accounts, universal health care.

Furthermore, for many of the minority groups, there are some benefits available.

In 2004, China experienced the greatest decrease in its poorest population since 1999. People with a per capita income of less than 668 renminbi (RMB; US$80.71) decreased by 2.9 million people or 10 percent; those with a per capita income of less than 924 RMB (US$111.64) decreased by 6.4 million people or 11.4 percent, according to statistics from the State Council's Poverty Reduction Office.

In 2014, China implemented targeted poverty alleviation focused on the most vulnerable population groups, including the poorest, the elderly, disabled people, and children without family support. The benefits include the "special social assistance benefits" like sickness aid. Over time, targeted poverty alleviation became increasingly integrated with other social assistance programs.

The "temporary benefit" program was established in 2014 and is administered by local governments. The requirements for relief are more flexible than dibao and are based on family emergencies including increased expenditures from sudden illness and other causes. Those who receive dibao may also receive the temporary benefit.

Local governments increasingly established feedback mechanisms for those using social services through which they can comment on the quality of services or make complaints. Academic Bingqin Li writes that these mechanisms "make people feel more empowered in their daily life, and the quick responses enhance their trust in the government's ability to deliver what it promised."

During July 2020, Beijing social security center put restrictions on the social security withholding and payment, which was allowed to be operational previously via third party organizations.

In 2021, the State Council issued the Human Rights Action Plan on China for 2021-2025 in an effort to expand the social safety net.

== Retirement ==
The Chinese retirement system has broad coverage, with almost 70% of urban residents covered by either the urban or rural pension plans as of 2022. However, it is not sufficiently funded to provide more than small benefits.

== Corporate Social Responsibility (CSR) ==
Corporate Social Responsibility is a management concept whereby companies integrate social and environmental concerns in their business operations and interactions with their stakeholders. In China, CRS is an important measure that the central government uses to evaluate performance of local government. Local firms may strategically add CRS to build good relationships with local government. The theory of resource dependence suggests, firm behavior is profoundly affected by the government because of its control over critical external resources (Pfeffer and Salancik, 1978). Moreover, based on the principle of reciprocity in social exchange theory (Gouldner, 1960; Blau, 1964), governments and businesses may embark on resource exchange when they realize their goals are cooperative. The existing literature has found that companies that increase their investment in social responsibility may increase financial benefits and direct value to stakeholders (Orlitzky et al., 2003; Kopel and Brand, 2012; Lambertini; Tampieri, 2015; Nollet et al., 2016; Shen et al., 2016). Corporate strategic management of relationships with governments can bring advantages in terms of market competition (Schuler et al., 2002; Hillman et al., 2004; Yang et al., 2019). Therefore, the promotion incentives of local government officials may motivate firms to improve their social responsibility performance as a strategy to obtain more political resources.

== See also ==
- Public health in the People's Republic of China
- Poverty in China
- Urbanization in China
- Social safety net
- Hukou System
- Human Rights in China
- Social security in China
- Iron rice bowl
