= Chinese-foreign marriages in mainland China =

Chinese-foreign marriages in mainland China are a recent phenomenon. From the founding of the People’s Republic of China (PRC) in 1949 until the early 1990s, Chinese-foreign marriages were seen as outside the norm. While data from the PRC’s Ministry of Civil Affairs indicates that the number of couples registering a Chinese-foreign marriage in mainland China was almost ten times greater in 2010 than in 1979, the figures for registered Chinese-foreign marriages are still relatively small compared to couples registered in a domestic marriage. The data also suggests that most Chinese-foreign marriages are intra-national rather than international in character. An article published by Elaine Jeffreys and Wang Pan, ‘Chinese-foreign Marriage in Mainland China’, in the University of Nottingham’s China Policy Institute Blog notes that “the most common type of Chinese-foreign marriage registered in mainland China until the late 2000s was between a mainland Chinese woman and a man from Hong Kong, Macao or Taiwan.” The article also reveals that these types of marriages are more common in Chinese women than they are in men. The article states:

“Over 8,000 women registered such a marriage in 1979. That figure rose to nearly 68,000 women in 2001 declining to below 40,000 in 2010, less than in the mid-1990s. The proportion of men from mainland China registering a marriage with a foreign bride in mainland China is low: 250 men in 1979, rising to a peak of around 20,000 men in 2005, and declining to less than 12,000 in 2010.”

== Common types of Chinese-foreign marriage ==
The PRC’s marriage registration regulations divide Chinese-foreign marriages into three different categories:

1. marriage between PRC citizens (中国公民) residing in mainland China (内地居民) and Overseas Chinese (华侨), i.e., Chinese citizens who reside in another country
2. marriage between citizens of mainland China and citizens of Hong Kong, Macao and Taiwan, i.e., territories that the PRC government claims as part of China, but which have separate legal jurisdictions; and
3. marriage between citizens of mainland China and foreign nationals (外国人, literally people from another country), which may include former PRC citizens who have acquired foreign citizenship (外籍华人).

== Attributing factors ==
New opportunities created by China’s rapid economic growth have been a significant factor in shaping the nature of Chinese-foreign marriage in mainland China over the recent years. Since the advent of Chinese-foreign marriages, most have been registered in provinces and cities, on China’s eastern seaboard, with an early history of economic development, such as Guangdong (nearly 370,000 marriages in total); Fujian (nearly 227,000); Zhejiang (around 57,000), and Shanghai (nearly 63,000). Geographically, these provinces are close to Hong Kong, Macau and Taiwan and have had relatively long history of trade connections. Similarly, the northern provinces of Heilongjiang and Jilin, and the city of Beijing have also recorded substantial numbers of registered Chinese-foreign marriage between 1979 and 2010. During this period, there were around 53,000 Chinese-foreign marriages registered in Heilongjiang, 50,000 in Jilin, and 20,600 in Beijing. This is attributed to the close geographic proximity of these areas to economic powerhouses, such as Japan and Korea. In contrast, the number of Chinese-foreign marriages registered in the economically undeveloped areas of western China is negligible. Jeffreys and Wang (2014) highlight that between 1979 and 2010; around 1,900 Chinese-foreign marriages were registered in the province of Gansu, 690 in Ningxia, 360 in Qinghai, and 200 in the Tibet Autonomous Region.

Despite these marriages being classified as "Chinese-foreign marriages", the above data suggests that they are intracultural, rather than, international in nature. In his article The rise of international marriage and divorce in contemporary Korea, Professor Doo-Sub Kim (2010) gives weight to this observation by highlighting the surge in cross-border marriages registered in South Korea between Chinese and South Korean nationals. Between 1990 and 2005, there was an increase of over 35,000 cross-border marriages registered in South Korea, with China becoming the main sending country for such marriages by the mid-1990s. According to the Ministry of Justice, Republic of Korea, the majority of these marriages are between Korean men and ethnic Korean-Chinese women.
