= China National Cotton Reserves Corporation =

The China National Cotton Reserve Management Corporation (CRCMC, Chinese: 中国储备棉管理总公司), also known as the China National Cotton Reserve Corporation, is a central enterprise responsible for the operation and management of the national cotton reserve policy.

== History ==
Established on March 28, 2003, CRCMC operates under the direct supervision of the State-owned Assets Supervision and Administration Commission of the State Council and is specifically tasked with managing the national cotton reserve. Following the company's creation, it assumed control of the original supply and marketing society responsible for the national reserve cotton operations, while also getting oversight from the Chinese cotton reserve management center. The corporation falls under the Fourth Category in surrender policy, indicating that it is not obligated to report state capital gains tax. As per the original plan, China Reserve Cotton aimed to establish 18 directly affiliated cotton reserves nationwide. As of 2012, China Reserve Cotton managed 16 directly subordinate depots and additionally leased several social warehouses for cotton storage.

On November 23, 2016, following approval from the State Council, the China Reserve Cotton Management Corporation was fully integrated into the China National Reserve Grain Management Corporation (CNRGC) and became a wholly owned subsidiary of CNRGC, thereby ceasing to be a directly supervised entity of the State-owned Assets Supervision and Administration Commission (SASAC).

== See also ==
- CNCotton
- China Cotton Association
- National Cotton and Cotton Yarn Trading Center
- China Grain Reserves Group
