= National Human Rights Action Plans of China =

The National Human Rights Action Plan of the People's Republic of China is the first ever document published by the Information Office of the State Council to promise Chinese citizens more legal protection, better livelihoods, and greater political rights.

== History ==
The 52-page document was released on April 13, 2009. It is a two-year plan that promises the right to a fair trial, participation in government decisions and allow the questioning of policies. It calls for measures to discourage torture, such as requiring interrogation rooms to be designed to physically separate interrogators from the accused.

The Human Rights Action Plan for 2021-2025 In 2021, the State Council emphasizes expanding the social safety net.

== Criticism ==
A list of government departments and institutions involved in drafting the plan was published, but it did not mention the police. Human rights watch groups have noted that the action plan had nothing new and was merely reiterating the country's existing commitments as covered under its Constitution and embodied in its laws and regulations. Provisions related to the prudent use of the death penalty for example, were set in place on January 1, 2007, when the Supreme People's Court was given the sole power to review and ratify all death sentences.

While the Action Plan talks about assistance for survivors of the 2008 Sichuan earthquake, there is no mention of Chinese activists who have been detained since last June for pursuing the issue of shoddy construction in schools that collapsed during the quake. These activists are amongst the estimated half million people who are under punitive detention without trial or charge, in the system known as 'laojiao' or re-education through labour. Laojiao sentences, which can be imposed by police officers and offer no trial mechanism to individuals facing them, serve functions such as suppressing political dissidents, maintaining public order, facilitating police criminal investigation and treating drug addiction. Moreover, the 'black jails', unregistered jails where dissidents are housed indefinitely are not addressed at all, and it is unclear whether the provisions for detainees will be seen as encompassing these facilities.

In addition, critics point to the fact that overall, the Plan emphasizes Social and Cultural Rights at the expense of Civil and Political Rights. The document does not propose any fundamental reforms of the country's one-party system, like making the courts independent of party control or allowing other parties or political groups to hold power. By focusing the responsibility of implementation on local bureaucracies, the levels of corruption within which are endemic, according to critics the government has reduced the Plan to mere lip-service of fundamental human rights.

== See also ==
- Charter 08
- Human rights in the People's Republic of China
