= Social security in China =

Social security in the People's Republic of China consists of two systems: one for urban workers in the formal sector and one for rural farmers and nonworking urban residents. The systems have different benefits and are funded differently. The urban system is the largest component of China's social security, and it includes both a social pooling account and mandatory individual accounts. In the less developed rural program, old farmers receive a small pension financed by general fiscal revenue and young farmers make small contributions to their individual social security accounts.

== Current systems ==
China has a mixed pension approach, including both basic social insurance and individual accounts.

There are two social security systems in China: one for urban workers in the formal sector and one for rural farmers and nonworking urban residents. The systems have different benefits and are funded differently.

The system for urban workers is the largest component of social security in China. It combines a social pooling account (a pay-as-you-go program in which contributions from workers pay benefits to the old) and mandatory individual accounts. In China, only the person who works (not their spouse) receives social security benefits. This is a factor contributing to the high participation in the urban work place by women in China. Migrant workers and "flexible" employees can also join the urban workers system; they must have a labor relationship with an employer or contribute at a specified rate.

The rural system is less developed than the system for urban workers. Old farmers receive a small pension financed by general fiscal revenue and young farmers contribute a small amount to their individual social security accounts.

Voluntary commercial supplementary pensions have been available since 2018. These plans are annuities with voluntary tax deferred contributions in which participants set the frequency and amount (not more than 12% of payroll) of their contributions. These plans are administered by for-profit private companies and for-profit state-owned companies, although only the largest such companies are able to guarantee the rate of return necessary to offer them. As of the end of 2020, 3.5% of employed workers have voluntary commercial supplementary pensions.

As of 2021, China has the largest social security system in the world.

The Ministry of Human Resources and Social Security (MOHRSS) Department of Pensions and Rural Social Insurance has general supervision over pension programs.

== History ==
Like other traditional societies, multi-generational households in which younger generations supported those in their old age were the historical trend. This impacted Chinese culture, including through a preference for sons to support parents in their old age. As China began to industrialize, traditional mechanisms of family support were not sustainable and the People's Republic of China developed a social security system.

In the early 1950s, China established a social security system covering workers at state-owned enterprises (SOEs), collectively-owned enterprises, government administrative units (such as Ministries) and operative units (such as public universities and state-owned hospitals). Each enterprise contributed 3% of employees' total wages to a government-managed social security account.

During the economic disruption of the Cultural Revolution, this system experienced a severe payment crisis. As a result, responsibility for paying social security benefits to SOE workers was moved to the SOEs themselves and the central government paid government administrative and operative employees from general fiscal revenue.

China began more thorough reforms of social security in the mid-1980s. China's Seventh Five-Year Plan required that responsibility for social security be moved from enterprises to society. Therefore, in 1986 the State Council issued regulations mandating the creation of a social security account for short-term workers. China also began local experiments with social pooling accounts for SOEs (particularly ones at the county and city levels) in an effort to help loss-making SOEs address their problems with paying social security.

The national rollout of the social insurance program began in 1991 and was formally implemented in 1992.

During the Third Plenary Session of the 14th Central Committee of the Communist Party in 1993, China passed its Decision on Several Issues Concerning the Establishment of the Socialist Market Economic System. In the area of social security, the Decision called for mandatory individual accounts for each employee. Before the 1990s, pensions had been entirely state-financed, with no contributions from workers.

The 1994 Labor Law included provisions dealing with social security.

In 1995, the State Council provided regions with two alternative approaches to social security which they could select. All chose the option of using large social pooling accounts and small individual accounts. Local governments were allowed to choose the size of the pooling accounts and as a result, systems varied regionally. Eleven industries with younger workers withdrew from these systems and established their own. Private enterprises and joint ventures resisted participating in social security. Participation therefore declined each year.

In July 1997, the State Council issued its "Decision on Establishing a Unified Enterprise Employee Basic Pension Insurance System." This regulation established a unified pension system for urban workers.

China's National Council for Social Security Fund was established in the late 1990s. It is the largest pension fund in China. The fund's assets under management expanded by 13% a year from 2010 to 2020. As of 2023, it had approximately $415 billion of assets under management.

The August 1998 "Circulation on Implementing the Provincial Pooling of Enterprise Basic Pension Insurance and Transferring Industry Pension Insurance Schemes to Local Governments" (issued by the State Council) merged the industrial pension programs with the local social security system.

In December 2005, the State Council issued its "Decision on Improving the Basic Social Security System for Workers and Staff in Enterprises," a regulation which sought to resolve the shortage of funds in individual social security accounts.

The Labor Contract Law of 2007 contained provisions dealing with social security.

China established its rural social security system in 2009.

Social insurance laws in 2010 and 2011 further developed the system.

In 2014, the State Council merged the system for urban workers with the system for public employees.

Development of China's system has been influenced by the World Bank multi-pillar model and mixed pension model structural reforms in Latin America.

== See also ==
- Welfare in China
- Economic history of China (1949-present)
- Economy of China
- Ministry of Human Resources and Social Security
- Pension systems by country
