= China Center of Adoption Affairs =

Agency for adoption of children in and from China

The China Center of Adoption Affairs (CCAA) was established on June 24, 1996 by China's Ministry of Civil Affairs. The CCAA is responsible for the welfare of children in the care of Child Welfare Institutes (orphanages), domestic adoption, and international adoption.

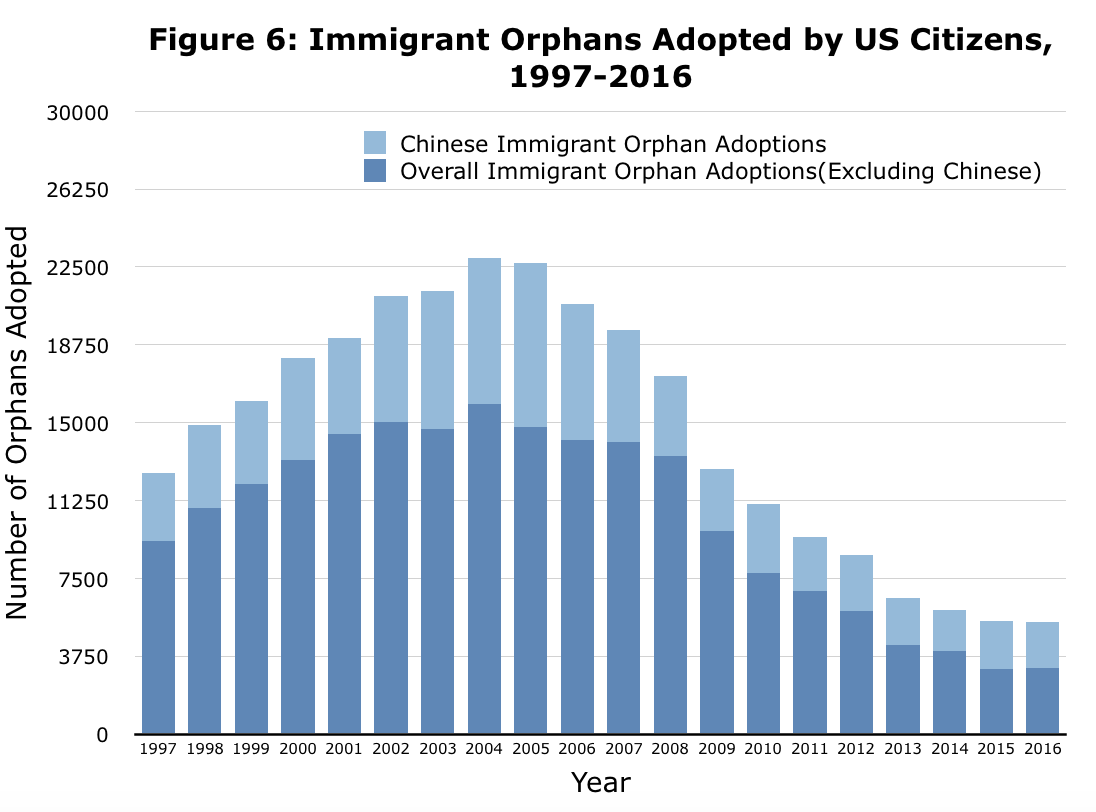
Chinese children adopted by U.S. citizens

== Administrative structure ==
Located in Beijing, the CCAA has one office that is divided into the following eight departments with specific administrative responsibilities: Administrative Office; Adopter's Eligibility Review Department; Child's Inter-Country Placement Department; Domestic Adoption Department; Child-Raising Department; Archives Management Department; Information and Technology Department; Finance Department; and General Affairs Department.

== Nurture of children in Social Welfare Institutions ==
The CCAA has announced four concrete missions with regard to its role in overseeing the welfare of children in social welfare institutions. The first mission is to conduct studies and make recommendations concerning child-raising programs in such institutions. Second, the CCAA aims to promulgate standards to be implemented in social welfare institutions. The third mission is to manage the training of care-providers. Fourth, the CCAA seeks to implement advanced methods and programs in child-rearing.

== Domestic adoptions ==
The CCAA also has four missions with regard to the handling of domestic adoptions. First, the CCAA is to conduct studies aimed at furthering the development of its domestic adoption program. The second mission is to develop and implement regulations for domestic adoption. The third mission is to develop a consulting service for the program, and the fourth mission is to coordinate and develop an inter-province domestic adoption service.

== Intercountry adoptions ==
China ratified the Hague Convention on Protection of Children and Co-operation in Respect of Intercountry Adoption on September 16, 2005. Pursuant to Article 6 of the convention, the CCAA is the Central Authority responsible for all inter-country adoptions in China. As such, the CCAA has the overall responsibility for the inter-country adoption of Chinese children. Chinese law governs the adoptability of Chinese children, regardless of the country where potential adopters reside. Pursuant to Article 4 of the Adoption Law of the People's Republic of China (Adoption Law), the following children under the age of 14 qualify for adoption: orphans; children who have been abandoned by their parents; and children whose parents are unable to care for them due to "unusual difficulties."

Since 2007, requirements of physical and mental fitness were imposed on those seeking to adopt children.

In September 2024, China has ended its international adoption program for non-relative foreign nationals.

=== Eight missions of the CCAA ===
The CCAA claims to have eight concrete missions with regard to intercountry adoptions. First, the CCAA receives and reviews applications and certifying documentation from foreign persons wishing to adopt. Second, the CCAA also receives certifying documentation from persons placing children out for adoption. Pursuant to Article 5 of the Adoption Law, the following individuals are entitled to place children out for adoption: guardians of an orphan; social welfare institutions; and parents who are unable to care for their children. The third mission of the CCAA is to locate and assign children who are available for adoption under the Adoption Law. Fourth, the CCAA is to follow up with the life and growth of adopted children in foreign countries. The CCAA's fifth mission is to assist other departments of the Chinese government that are involved in the adoption of Chinese children. Such departments include Child Welfare Institutes, provincial Notarial Offices responsible for issuance of the final adoption certificate, and the Public Security Bureau responsible for issuing Chinese passports and exit permits for adopted children. The sixth mission is to archive all documentation for each party involved in a child's adoption, including the application for adoption, certifying documents, and materials concerning the life of the child in his or her new home. Seventh, the CCAA is to conduct any liaison, counseling, or coordination work involved with inter-country adoptions. The final stated mission of the CCAA is to handle any other matters regarding the intercountry adoption process that has not been delegated to another office or authority.

== International adoption ==
In 2005, China had agreements with the following 16 nations for inter-country adoption: United States, Canada, United Kingdom, France, Spain, the Netherlands, Belgium, Denmark, Norway, Sweden, Finland, Iceland, Ireland, Australia, New Zealand, and Singapore.

After the United States, Spain is the country that adopts the most children from China. In 2005, over 2,700 children were adopted by Spanish families. Families in Australia and Canada were also frequent adopters.

=== United States ===
The United States was the number one destination for children adopted abroad, and between 2000 and 2006, U.S. residents adopted more children from China than any other country.

China first allowed adoptions to the United States in 1991, when 61 children were issued immigrant visas. Between 1991 and 2005, the number of American adoptions of Chinese children increased tremendously, with a total of 62,906 children adopted by U.S. residents during that time. However, in later years, largely as a result of adoption scandals, the number of American adoptions of Chinese children declined from a high of 7,906, in 2005, to 2,587, in 2011. For years, China was deemed one of the safest countries for adoption and due to the One Child Policy there was a significant influx of abandoned children, primarily young girls in need of families. There is mounting evidence that child-trafficking rings were present in China. A notable case occurred in Hunan province where orphanages were reported to have bought babies from traffickers with little recorded information of their provenance, before reselling them to other orphanages or families, with many being adopted internationally.

== Role under the Hague Adoption Convention ==
The 1993 Hague Adoption Convention entered into force in China on 1 January 2006. According to the country profile China submitted to the Hague Conference, the Ministry of Civil Affairs is China's Central Authority for intercountry adoption, and the China Centre for Children's Welfare and Adoption (CCCWA) is authorized by the Chinese government to carry out the Central Authority functions set out in Articles 15 to 21 of the Convention. Provincial civil affairs departments determine whether a child is eligible for intercountry adoption, process adoption registration, and issue the conformity certificate required by Article 23.

In the procedure described in the profile, the public security authorities first search for an abandoned child's biological parents, and a child is considered for intercountry adoption only if the child welfare institution and civil affairs authorities conclude that domestic placement is not possible; the adoption proceeds if no one claims the child within 60 days of a public notice in provincial newspapers. The files of eligible children are then submitted to the CCCWA, which the profile describes as the only entity designated by the Chinese government to handle intercountry adoption, including matching children with prospective adoptive parents. The CCCWA seeks confirmation of each proposed match from the Central Authority of the receiving state, which has three months to respond. After the CCCWA issues a "Notice of Travelling to China for Adoption", the prospective parents travel to China, usually for about 15 days, to register the adoption at the provincial civil affairs department, and may contact the child welfare institution's staff only after this stage, in line with the Convention's prohibition on contact before matching.

The profile states that 77 foreign accredited adoption agencies worked with the CCCWA and that only agencies cooperating with the CCCWA could carry out China's adoption program; these agencies screen and prepare applicants, submit application documents, assist with travel, and submit post-placement reports. It lists 17 partner states, including Australia, Canada, the United Kingdom, and the United States, of which only Singapore was not a party to the Convention. In September 2024, a spokesperson for China's foreign ministry said that China no longer allowed foreign adoptions of Chinese children, except by blood relatives or for the adoption of a stepchild.

== See also ==
- One-child policy § Adoption and abandonment
