= State Grain Reserve Bureau =

Chinese government body

The State Grain Reserve Bureau (Chinese: 国家粮食储备局), under the State Council of the People's Republic of China, oversees the macro-control of national food management, specific business circulation, industry guidance, and the administrative management of central grain reserves. Established in 1991, it was initially managed by the Ministry of Commerce and the Ministry of Domestic Trade, abolished in 1999, and subsequently reorganized as the State Grain Bureau and the China Reserve Grain Management Corporation.

== History ==
=== Background ===
Upon the establishment of the People's Republic of China in 1949, the financial department oversaw the collecting, storage, dispatch, and supply of public grain, while the commerce department managed grain purchasing and sales, transportation, market regulation, and other operations. The China Grain Corporation (Chinese: 中国粮食公司), part of the Ministry of Trade of the Central People's Government, and the General Administration of Grain Management (Chinese: 粮食管理总局), under the Ministry of Finance of the Central People's Government, have consolidated the leadership of national grain management entities. On 7 August 1952, the 17th meeting of the Central People's Government Committee ratified the Decision on the Adjustment of the Institutions of the Central People's Government.

On September 1, 1952, the China Grain Corporation and the General Administration of Grain Management were amalgamated to establish the Ministry of Grain of the Central People's Government, where the Finance and Economy Committee of the State Council oversaw the operations of the Ministry of Grain. On September 15, 1969, the Ministry of Commerce was established by the amalgamation of the Ministry of Commerce, the Ministry of Grain, the National Federation of Supply and Marketing Cooperatives, and the Central Administration for Industry and Commerce. On July 1, 1970, the Ministry of Commerce, the Ministry of Grain, the National Federation of Supply and Marketing Cooperatives, and the Central Administration for Industry and Commerce were officially consolidated to establish the Ministry of Commerce.

On April 27, 1979, the Central Committee of the Chinese Communist Party issued a directive to reestablish the Ministry of Grain of China. On February 22, 1982, the Ministry of Grain was created by the Central Committee of the Fifth National People's Congress. On February 22, 1982, the 22nd meeting of the Standing Committee of the Fifth National People's Congress enacted the Resolution on the Institutional Reform of the State Council, which consolidated the Ministry of Commerce, the General Administration of Supply and Marketing, and the Ministry of Grain into the Ministry of Commerce.

=== Establish ===
In September 1990, the State Council resolved to create a national special grain reserve system, and established the National Special Grain Reserve Leadership Group (Chinese: 国家专项粮食储备领导小组) along with the State Grain Reserve Bureau, tasked with overseeing the management of the national grain reserve. The State Grain Reserve Bureau is an entity immediately subordinate to the State Council, representing the Ministry of Commerce.

In March 1993, the 8th National People's Congress sanctioned the State Council's institutional reform, resulting in the dissolution of the Ministry of Commerce and the Ministry of Materials of China, and the establishment of the Ministry of Domestic Trade. The former Ministry of Commerce's Food Comprehensive Department, the Grain Purchases and Sales Department, the Grain Storage and Transportation Bureau, and the National Grain Reserve Bureau were consolidated to form the new State Grain Reserve Bureau, which operates under the Ministry of Domestic Trade at the vice-ministerial level.

=== Merge ===
On November 24, 1999, the State Grain Reserve Bureau was reorganized into the State Grain Bureau and the China National Grain Reserve Management Corporation.

== Leadership ==
Directors:

- Bai Meiqing (March 1991 - January 1995)
- Luo Zhiling (January 1995 - July 1998)
- Gao Tiesheng (July 1998 - March 2000)

== See also ==
- State Grain Bureau
- National Food and Strategic Reserves Administration
