= State Grain Bureau =

Chinese government agency

The State Grain Bureau (Chinese: 国家粮食局), a state bureau that was previously under the administration of the National Development and Reform Commission of the People's Republic of China, is responsible for the specific operations of macroeconomic regulation and control of the national grain circulation, industry guidance, and administration of the central grain reserves.

== History ==
On November 24, 1999, the State Grain Reserve Bureau was reorganized into the State Grain Bureau and the China National Grain Reserve Management Corporation. The State Council mandated the State Grain Bureau to undertake the responsibilities of grain reserve management and macro-control in 2000.

The Decision of the First Meeting of the 13th National People's Congress on the Institutional Reform Program of the State Council was enacted by the First Meeting of the Thirteenth National People's Congress on March 17, 2018, thereby approving the Institutional Reform Program of the State Council. The National Food and Strategic Reserves Administration is established by the program. The National Development and Reform Commission is responsible for management. Concurrently, the State Grain Bureau was abolished.

== Leadership ==
Director of Bureau

- Nie Zhenbang (March 2000-April 2012)
- Ren Zhengxiao (April 2012 - October 2016)
- Zhang Wufeng (February 2017 - March 2018)
