= Central Education Work Leading Group =

Chinese Communist Party body

- 中央教育工作领导小组; Zhōngyāng Jiàoyù Gōngzuò Lǐngdǎo Xiǎozǔ
- Emblem of the Chinese Communist Party

Agency overview
- Formed: March 2018; 8 years ago
- Type: Leading small group
- Jurisdiction: Chinese Communist Party
- Headquarters: Beijing
- Agency executive: Huai Jinpeng, Leader; Deputy Director; Office Director
- Parent agency: Central Committee of the Chinese Communist Party

Central Education Work Leading Group
- Simplified Chinese: 中央教育工作领导小组
Transcriptions
Standard Mandarin
- Hanyu Pinyin: Zhōngyāng Jiàoyù Gōngzuò Lǐngdǎo Xiǎozǔ

The Central Education Work Leading Group is a coordination body set up under the Central Committee of the Chinese Communist Party for the purpose of managing rural affairs.

== History ==
The Central Education Work Leading Group was established in March 2018 as part of the deepening the reform of the Party and state institutions. In May 2021, the Leading Group issued a document regarding "Deepening the Study, Publicity and Implementation of the Party's Education Policy", the first time it issued a document.

== Role ==
The group is the CCP's leading body on education affairs, allowing the CCP to exercise leadership over education work. The Office of the Leading Group is located within the Ministry of Education, and has a close relationship with the Ministry's Comprehensive Reform Department.
