= China Civil Affairs University =

Public university in Beijing

- 民政职业大学
- Type: Public
- Established: 1959; 67 years ago
- Affiliations: Ministry of Civil Affairs
- Students: 4,500
- Location: Beijing, China; 39°59′23″N 116°18′19″E
- Campus: Urban

China Civil Affairs University (Chinese: 民政职业大学) is a public university located in Beijing and Yanjiao, China, which is affiliated with the Ministry of Civil Affairs of the People's Republic of China.

== History ==
The predecessor of the school was the Ministry of Internal Affairs Cadre School (Chinese: 内务部干部学校) established in 1959.

In November 1983, the Ministry of Civil Affairs approved the establishment of the Ministry of Civil Affairs Management Cadre College (Chinese: 民政部管理干部学院).

In May 1995, the Ministry of Civil Affairs established the Ministry of Civil Affairs Training Center (Chinese: 民政部培训中心), which shared office space with the college.

In June 2007, the Beijing Municipal People's Government approved the establishment of Beijing College of Social Administration (Chinese: 北京社会管理职业学院).

On September 6, 2024, China Civil Affairs University was unveiled in Beijing.

== Academics ==
The university runs 25 undergraduate majors, including smart healthcare management, nursing, social work and modern funeral management. It announced the country's first undergraduate program in marriage.
