= Zhang Wufeng =

Chinese politician

- 张务锋

Director of the National Food and Strategic Reserves Administration
- In office April 2018 – June 2022
- Premier: Li Keqiang
- Preceded by: Ren Zhengxiao
- Succeeded by: Cong Liang

Personal details
- Born: October 1960 (age 65–66) Laiwu County, Shandong, China
- Party: Chinese Communist Party (expelled in 2022)
- Education: Jining Business School; Central Party School of the Chinese Communist Party

Chinese name
- Simplified Chinese: 张务锋
- Traditional Chinese: 張務鋒
Transcriptions
Standard Mandarin
- Hanyu Pinyin: Zhāng Wùfēng

Zhang Wufeng (Chinese: 张务锋; born October 1960) is a former Chinese politician who served as director of the National Food and Strategic Reserves Administration from 2018 to 2022. As of June 2022 he was under investigation by China's top anti-corruption agency.

He was a delegate to the 12th National People's Congress. He was a representative of the 19th National Congress of the Chinese Communist Party. He was a member of the 19th CCP Central Commission for Discipline Inspection.

== Biography ==
Zhang was born in Laiwu County (now Laiwu), Shandong, in October 1960. In February 1978, he entered Jining Business School, majoring in statistics.

After graduating in December 1979, he was assigned to the Shandong Provincial Administration for Industry and Commerce, where he eventually became its deputy director in August 2000. He joined the Chinese Communist Party (CCP) in April 1984. In December 2006, he was transferred to Linyi and appointed executive vice mayor. In January 2011, he was named acting mayor, confirmed in the following month. He became director of Shandong Development and Reform Commission in February 2013, and served until July 2015, when he was chosen as vice governor of Shandong.

In February 2017, he was appointed director of the State Grain Reserve Bureau (soon was reshuffled as the National Food and Strategic Reserves Administration in March 2018), and was admitted to member of the CCP National Development and Reform Commission Committee, the commission's top authority.

=== Downfall ===
On 16 June 2022, he has been placed under investigation for "serious violations of laws and regulations" by the Central Commission for Discipline Inspection (CCDI), the party's internal disciplinary body, and the National Supervisory Commission, the highest anti-corruption agency of China.

On 30 December 2022, Wufeng was expelled from the CCP.

Government offices
Preceded by Ren Zhengxiao	Director of the National Food and Strategic Reserves Administration; 2018–2022	Succeeded by Cong Liang
