= Xinjiang Free-Trade Zone =

Area in China

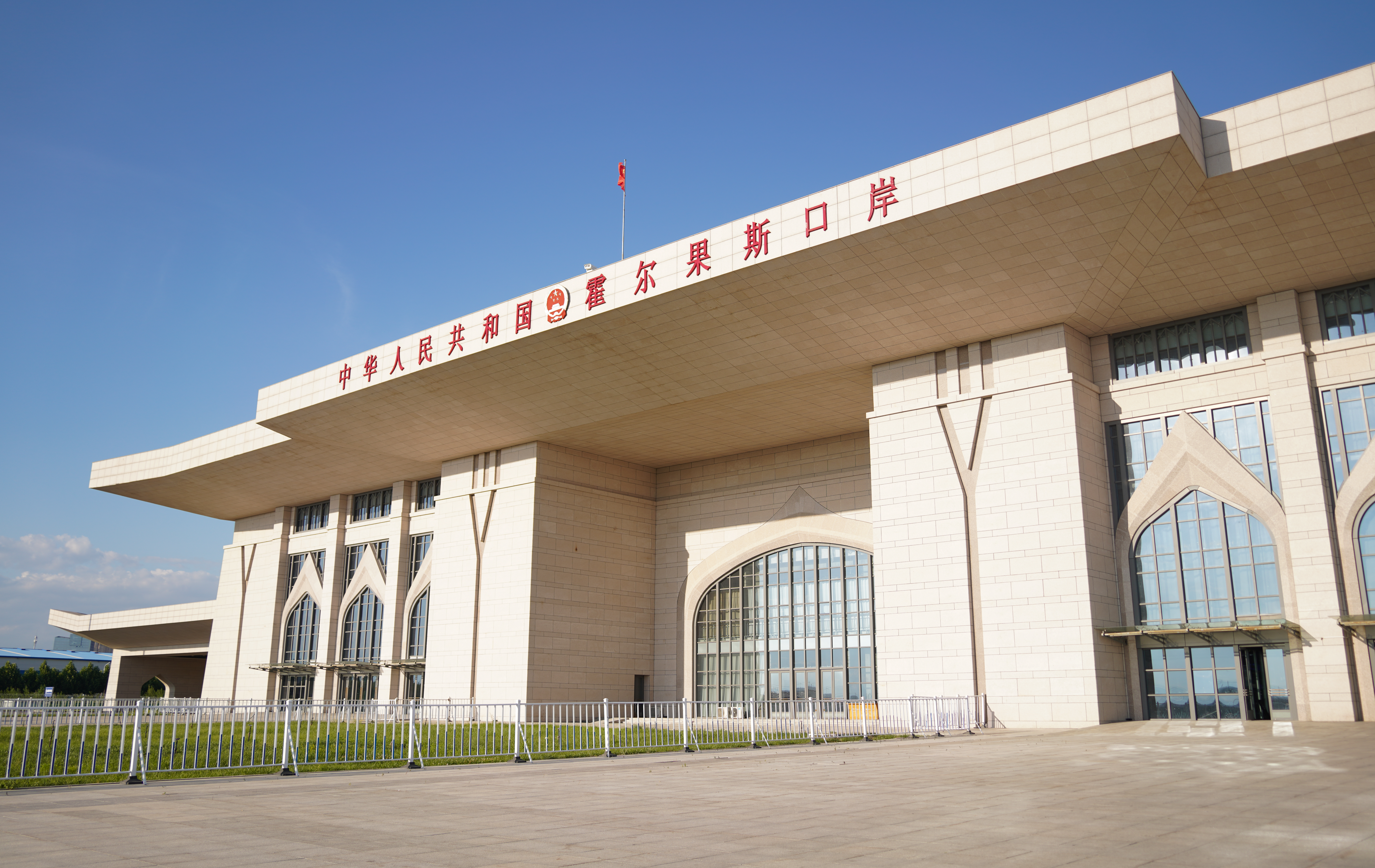
China-Kazakhstan Border Crossing at the New Khorgos Port of Entry, Xinjiang

The Xinjiang Free-Trade Zone (Chinese: 中国（新疆）自由贸易试验区, 新疆自贸试验区) in China, is located in the northwestern border region and spans an area of 179.66 square kilometers. It consists of three zones: Ürümqi (134.6 square kilometers), Kashgar (28.48 square kilometers), and Khorgos (16.58 square kilometers). This zone started its operation on November 1, 2023.

== History ==
On October 21, 2023, State Council of the People's Republic of China released the Comprehensive Plan for the China (Xinjiang) Free Trade Zone. On November 1, 2023, the China (Xinjiang) Free Trade Zone was opened in Ürümqi, marking the commencement of its comprehensive construction phase. On December 5, 2023, the inauguration ceremony for the Khorgos Area of the Xinjiang Free Trade Zone took place at the sixth generation of the State Gates of Khorgos. A total of 26 firms executed contracts worth 20.95 billion yuan, encompassing sectors such as equipment manufacture, new energy, new materials, commerce and logistics, and finance. On June 24, 2024, the inaugural shipment of 10 tons of bonded aviation oil was successfully replenished into Uzbekistan My Freighter Airlines C6655, signifying the introduction of bonded aviation oil in the Xinjiang Free Trade Zone, which has emerged as a landmark initiative of the zone.

On August 9, 2024, the inaugural cross-border transfer of 200 million tenge banknotes from the Khorgos Area of the Xinjiang Free Trade Zone was finalized at the China-HKSAR Khorgos International Border Cooperation Center. 2024 On November 15, 2024, Chairman Erkin Tuniyaz chaired the 82nd Executive Meeting of the 14th People's Government of the Xinjiang Uygur Autonomous Region, during which the List of Enabling Powers was reviewed and approved, designating the second batch of autonomous region-level economic and social management matters to be delegated to the Xinjiang Free Trade Zone. The second batch comprises 29 articles of authority concerning economic and social management at the autonomous region level.

== Distribution ==
=== Ürümqi ===
The Ürümqi Area spans 134.6 square kilometers and is strategically positioned to leverage the advantages of land and air port connectivity. It aims to enhance the construction of a national logistics hub, emphasizing the growth of international trade, modern logistics, advanced manufacturing, the textile and garment sector, biomedicine, new energy, new materials, software, and information technology services, along with other emerging industries.

=== Kashgar ===
Kashgar encompasses an area of 28.48 square kilometers, with its functional division leveraging the benefits of international trade logistics channels. It aims to enhance its export-oriented economy by concentrating on the deep processing of agricultural and sideline products, textile and garment manufacturing, and the assembly of electronic products, alongside other labor-intensive industries.

=== Khorgos ===
The Khorgos Area encompasses 16.58 square kilometers and operates through a functional division that leverages the benefits of cross-border collaboration and serves as a national logistics hub at a land border port. It prioritizes the advancement of cross-border logistics, tourism, financial services, exhibitions, and other contemporary service sectors, while also aiming to expand and enhance specialized industries such as pharmaceuticals, electronic information, and new materials.

== See also ==
- National Cotton and Cotton Yarn Trading Center
