= China Cotton Association =

Chinese non-profit federation

China Cotton Association (CCA) is a Chinese non-profit federation specializing in cotton, which is voluntarily established by cotton farmers, cotton farmers' cooperative organizations, enterprises engaged in cotton production, purchase, processing and operation, cotton textile enterprises, cotton research institutes and other organs and which accepts the supervision and management of the Chinese Ministry of Civil Affairs and the professional guidance of the All-China Federation of Supply and Marketing Cooperatives.

== Function of CCA ==
The CCA is made up of players from the cotton sector, cotton farm groups, those in the cotton production sector, buyers, sub-contractors, vendors, exporters, warehousing companies, the clothing industry and cotton research organizations.

Members of the association are either organizations or businesses working in the cotton sector that wish to participate in a Chinese consultation structure. Set up in September 2003, the association has since actively developed numerous service and conciliation activities, set up a code of ethics and internal regulations as well as professional protection services within the sector.

The association has become one of the major partners and an important relay between official organizations, governmental structures and agricultural and industrial players in the Chinese cotton sector.

It is a major contributor to the development of the Chinese cotton sector. Over the last four years, it has established numerous working relationships and many regular exchanges with international organizations in the cotton trade and industry in the main producer and cotton-buying countries worldwide.

== Industry ==
- China is the largest cotton producing country in the world (35.8 million bales, 2007)
- China has about 24 million cotton farmers
- 7,500 textile companies which produce an estimated RMB 488 billion of cotton cloth
- Chinese cotton production requires an average 3,000 to 5,000 cubic metres of water per hectare
- 30–40% of all pesticides applied in China are applied to cotton, making it the most heavily treated agricultural crop.
- Xinjiang is the country's top cotton growing area.

=== Chinese cotton sector ===
Chinese cotton production in 2006 related to a planted area of nearly five and a half million hectares (5,410,000 hectares), i.e. eighty one million 'mous' (a 'mou' is the traditional area unit used in rural China, which is about a fifteenth of a hectare) (81,130,000 'mous'). According to the official Chinese Statistics Office figures, production in 2006 was 6,730,000 tonnes. Of this, a third of the production came from the Xinjiang province, 2,180,000 tonnes. Based on these production figures, it is estimated that it was needed to import 4,300,000 tonnes of cotton in order to meet the demand, but in fact between September 2006 and August 2007 (which is the annual cotton season in China) the country only had to import 2,280,000 tonnes of cotton, i.e. 47% less than predicted. Two million tonnes less than predicted. Actual production in Xinjiang was over 3,200,000 tonnes of cotton. Production in China is in the region of 7,700,000 tonnes.they take the cotton to a machine that will ship it and then makes it into the thread they need to make cotton.

Mill production is increasing quite rapidly. According to the Chinese Statistics Office, between September 2006 and August 2007 China produced 19,030,000 tonnes of yarn. It is up 18.8%, but is however an increase that is 8 points down on the same period in the previous year.

According to a study undertaken by the Chinese Cotton Association, in 2007 in China the planted area of cotton was 82,600,000 'mous' (around 5 and a half million hectares), a slight increase on the previous year. Production forecasts anticipate production remaining stable against the previous year, with perhaps a slight increase to reach around 7,700,000 tonnes once again.

Demand in China is constantly increasing. Specialists estimate that textile production for 2007 will continue to grow. It is thought that the production of cotton thread will increase 10% to reach around 21 million tonnes. With a cotton requirement of 12 million tonnes, China needs to import around 4 million tonnes of cotton.

== See also ==
- Cotton
- Agriculture in China
  - CNCotton
- History of agriculture in the People's Republic of China
- Cotton paper
- Organic cotton
- Xinjiang cotton industry
- National Cotton and Cotton Yarn Trading Center
