= Cong Liang =

Chinese politician

- 丛亮

Deputy Director of the National Development and Reform Commission
- In office 30 April 2023 – 5 July 2024
- Director: Zheng Shanjie

Director of the National Food and Strategic Reserves Administration
- In office 2 July 2022 – 30 August 2023
- Premier: Li Keqiang; Li Qiang
- Preceded by: Zhang Wufeng
- Succeeded by: Liu Huanxin

Secretary-General of the National Development and Reform Commission
- In office June 2018 – July 2020
- Director: He Lifeng
- Preceded by: Li Pumin
- Succeeded by: Zhao Chenxin

Personal details
- Born: December 1971 (age 54) Wendeng County, Shandong, China
- Party: Chinese Communist Party
- Education: Tsinghua University; Central University of Finance and Economics; Graduate School of Chinese Academy of Social Sciences

Chinese name
- Simplified Chinese: 丛亮
- Traditional Chinese: 叢亮
Transcriptions
Standard Mandarin
- Hanyu Pinyin: Cóng Liàng

Cong Liang (Chinese: 丛亮; born December 1971) is a Chinese politician who is the currently a deputy director of the Development Research Center of the State Council. He was previously the director of the National Food and Strategic Reserves Administration from July 2022 to August 2023, and the deputy director of the National Development and Reform Commission from April 2023 to July 2024.

== Biography ==
Cong was born in Wendeng County (now Wendeng District of Weihai), Shandong, in December 1971. In 1994, he graduated from Tsinghua University majoring in the Department of Mechanical Engineering before gaining a master's degree in economics from the Central University of Finance and Economics in 1997. He attended the Graduate School of Chinese Academy of Social Sciences where he obtained his doctor's degree in economics in 2003.

Beginning in April 1997, he served in several posts in the State Planning Commission (later renamed National Development and Reform Commission), becoming secretary-general in February 2009 and deputy director in June 2020. On June 23, 2022, he was appointed director of the National Food and Strategic Reserves Administration (NFSRA), succeeding Zhang Wufeng, who was placed under investigation for "serious violations of laws and regulations" by the Central Commission for Discipline Inspection (CCDI), the party's internal disciplinary body, and the National Supervisory Commission, the highest anti-corruption agency of China, on June 16.

In April 2023, he was appointed as a deputy director of the NDRC. In August 2023, he was succeeded by Liu Huanxin as the director of the NFSRA. On 5 July 2024, he was removed as a NDRC deputy director and was appointed as a deputy director of the Development Research Center of the State Council.

Government offices
Preceded by Cheng Jianlin	Head of the National Economy Comprehensive Department of the National Development and Reform Commission; 2016–2018	Succeeded by Yan Pengcheng
Preceded by Li Pumin	Secretary-General of the National Development and Reform Commission; 2018–2020	Succeeded by Zhao Chenxin
Preceded by Zhang Wufeng	Director of the National Food and Strategic Reserves Administration; 2022–2023	Succeeded by Liu Huanxin
