= Central Leading Group for Maintaining Stability =

Chinese Communist Party body

- 中央维护稳定工作领导小组

Agency overview
- Formed: 27 March 1998; 28 years ago
- Dissolved: March 2018; 8 years ago
- Superseding agency: Central Political and Legal Affairs Commission
- Headquarters: Beijing
- Parent agency: Central Committee of the Chinese Communist Party

The Central Leading Group for Maintaining Stability was a coordination body set up under the Central Committee of the Chinese Communist Party for the purpose of what it termed "stability maintenance."

== History ==
Established on 27 March 1998, with Wei Jianxing as the group leader, Qian Qichen and Luo Gan as deputy group leaders, and members including Tang Jiaxuan, Jia Chunwang, Xu Yongyue, Zhao Qizheng, Wang Shengjun, Wei Fulin, Yang Guoping and Xu Guangchun. According to a series of institutional reforms issued by the CCP Central Committee in March 2018, "the Central Leading Group for Maintaining Stability and its office will no longer be established, and the relevant responsibilities will be undertaken by the Central Political and Legal Affairs Commission."
