= National Bureau of Corruption Prevention =

Former PRC state agency, merged in 2018

The National Bureau of Corruption Prevention (Chinese: 国家预防腐败局) was an agency of the People's Republic of China under the direct administration of the State Council.

== History ==
It was established in 2007 with the objective of improving government transparency, developing and improving the mechanisms through which corruption was combatted, and coordinating anti-corruption efforts. Upon its inauguration, the National Bureau of Corruption Prevention established a website to publicize events and post corruption-related news. The website also provides citizens with a forum to directly submit complaints of corruption and opinions on the government's work. Within hours of its launch, the site crashed under the volume of complaints.

In March 2018, the Bureau was one of three state agencies with inspection powers (along with the Ministry of Supervision and the Supreme People's Procuratorate's General Administration of Anti-Corruption and Bribery) which merged with the Central Commission for Discipline Inspection to form the National Supervisory Commission as part of the deepening the reform of the Party and state institutions. Like the other merged state agencies, the Bureau was dissolved through the merger.

== Functions ==
The Bureau was a distinct entity from the Communist Party's Central Discipline Inspection Commission, which is charged with investigating corruption and disciplinary infractions within party ranks. The CCDI operates independent of the government (i.e., the State Council), and its jurisdiction is limited to party members. Moreover, the CCDI may initiate investigations for infractions not necessarily related to corruption nor constituting a criminal offense, such as having a "lavish lifestyle" unbecoming of a Communist Party member, or even extramarital relationships. The bureau also seeks cooperation on corruption prevention at the multilateral level.

== See also ==
- Anti-corruption campaign under Xi Jinping
- Corruption in the People's Republic of China
