= CGMR =

CGMR can refer to:

- The Central German Metropolitan Region

== See also ==
- CGRM
- CGMR-C - the Centre for Geographic Medicine Research-Coast of the Kenya Medical Research Institute
