= Xinjiang cotton industry =

Cotton industry in Xinjiang, China

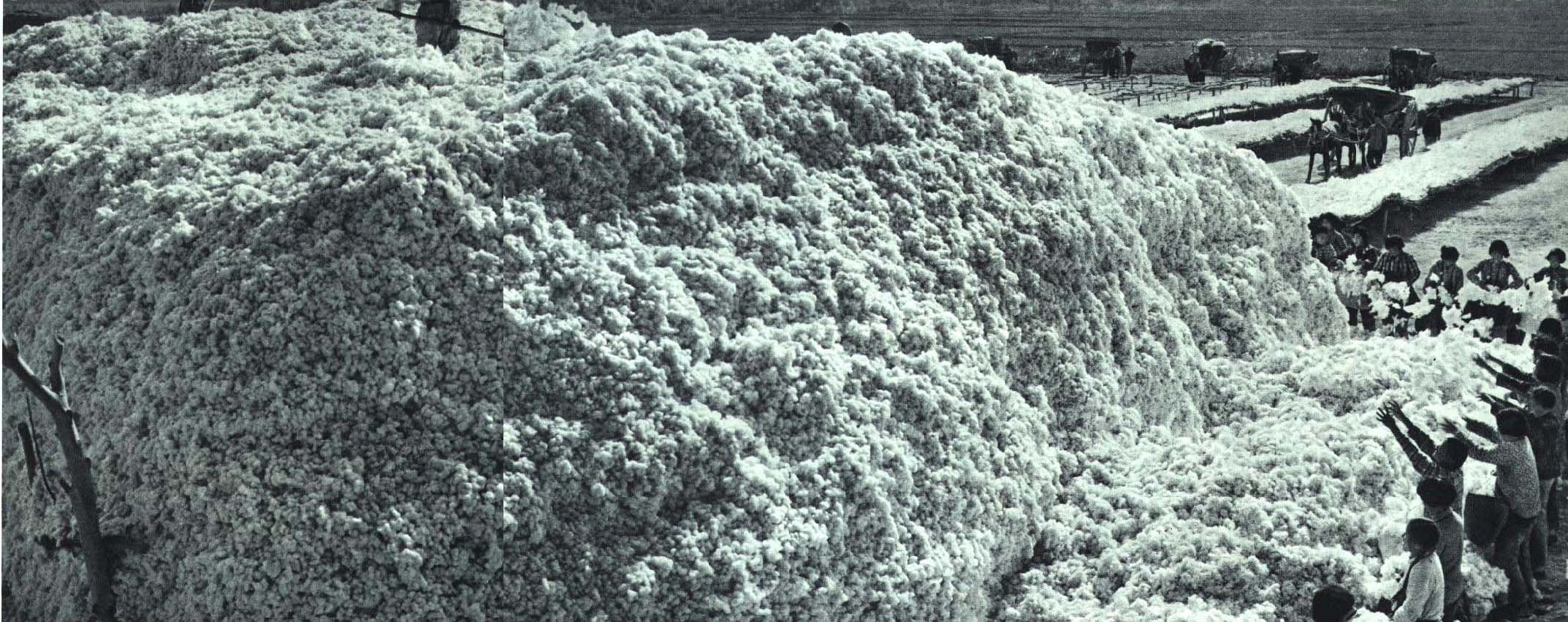
1964 Xinjiang cotton harvest

Xinjiang is the leading producer of cotton in China, accounting for about 20% of the world's cotton production and 80% of China's domestic cotton production. Critics of the industry's practices have alleged widespread human rights abuses, prompting global boycotts; China rejects the accusations.

== History ==
The cotton industry has a long history in Xinjiang, with cotton having been grown in the region since the 1st millennium AD.

=== Modern era ===
At the turn of the 20th century, Xinjiang was a producer of raw goods, including cotton. Turfan was Xinjiang's biggest producer of cotton, with 60% of its cotton exported to Russia, and around 45% of Kashgar's exports (1.35 million roubles out of 3 million total exports) to Russia in 1902 were of cotton cloth. The Russian Revolution coincided with a decrease in cotton exports from Xinjiang to Russia, significantly harming the cotton industry and the local economy as a whole.

Throughout the lattermost portions of the 20th century, the government of China sought to turn Xinjiang into a regional cotton-producing powerhouse. The management of cotton production in the region was heavily reformed in 1975, though this led to significantly decreased yields in 1976 and 1977. However, production rebounded and grew significantly after these years; cotton harvests increased by a factor of 27 between 1977 and 1997, when a total yield of 1.5 million tons was recorded. During the 1990s, the Xinjiang Production and Construction Corps began to contribute significantly to Xinjiang's economy, being responsible for 40% of the region's cotton production in 1997. The mid-1990s also saw China use protectionist trade policies to support cotton growers, with the government paying a 20% higher price to purchase domestic cotton than foreign cotton of the same quality in order to support the cotton industry. Despite the growth in cotton production until that point, Xinjiang's economy went into a recession during the late 1990s owing in part to a decrease in the international demand for cotton. Nevertheless, by the end of the 2nd millennium AD, half of the value of Xinjiang's total agricultural production was derived from cotton; Xinjiang had become the largest cotton-producing province in China and produced over one-quarter of all of China's domestically grown cotton by 2001.

In 2003 China began prioritizing extra-long staple (ELS) cotton over upland cotton, due to ELS cotton's climactic preferences this shifted the Chinese cotton industry from the Yangtze River Region and Huang He Region to Xinjiang. As of 2009, the bulk of China's cotton supply was harvested through the use of labor-heavy cultivation methods. At that time, cotton in the region faced unique challenges in production, with over one-fifth of cotton plants experiencing disease and chronic shortages of laborers willing to pick cotton hindering the efficiency and effectiveness of cotton cultivation.

In 2019, Xinjiang was responsible for 84% of China's cotton production. Most of the cotton grown in Xinjiang is high quality extra-long staple length cotton. Annual production is approximately 5 million tonnes. Due to trade tensions and allegations of forced labor, pressure has been placed on cotton growers and suppliers, with small firms being the hardest hit. Xinjiang accounts for a fifth of the world's cotton production.

Vietnam is one of the main importers of Xinjiang cotton.

== Forced labor allegations ==
The cotton industry in Xinjiang has been accused of using large-scale forced labor in the production of cotton following the creation of the Xinjiang re-education camps. The Chinese government rejects these accusations pointing to inconsistencies in the evidence from former Xinjiang residents. Instead, China characterises such programs as efforts to stimulate economic growth, provide vocational training and help combat extremism.

=== Reactions ===
==== Reactions by business groups ====
In March 2020, the Better Cotton Initiative (BCI) suspended licensing and assurance activities in the Xinjiang Uyghur Autonomous Region of China due to "persistent allegations" of forced labor in the region. In October 2020, BCI ceased all field-level activities in Xinjiang, citing "sustained allegations of forced labour and other human rights abuses" in the region leading to "an increasingly untenable operating environment". On March 26, 2021, the BCI Shanghai representative office said it found no evidence of forced labor in Xinjiang. The office stated that since 2012, the Xinjiang project site has performed second-party credibility audits and third-party verifications over the years, to reach their findings. BCI subsequently removed its October 2020 statement from its website regarding the ceasing of field-level activities in Xinjiang.

After the United States issued restrictions on the imports of cotton in Xinjiang in September 2020, global businesses began to decrease their use of cotton produced in Xinjiang.

==== Reactions by country ====
===== China =====
Chinese state media has called the reporting on forced labor in Xinjiang "baseless" and stated that any sort of boycott or sanction would harm cotton workers in Xinjiang. A commentary published by the Chinese state-run Xinhua News Agency said that BCI was part of a "western smear campaign". Public opinion in China has largely been in line with the position of state media and institutions. Perceptions of popular opinion may be distorted because of widespread censorship of posts which do not match the Chinese Communist Party (CCP) line.

Decisions by various companies to stop buying Xinjiang cotton have led more than 40 celebrities from mainland China, Hong Kong, and Taiwan, including Eddie Peng, Eason Chan, Uyghur actress Dilraba Dilmurat, Huang Xuan, Victoria Song, and Zhou Dongyu, to sever ties with those companies. In March 2021, Chinese consumers began boycotting companies which had vowed not to use cotton from Xinjiang. Chinese consumers criticized H&M, which in September 2020 announced it would stop using a Chinese manufacturer accused of using forced labor, citing the BCI's decision to stop licensing Xinjiang cotton. People's Daily, the official newspaper of the Central Committee of the Chinese Communist Party, named New Balance, Burberry and all BCI members in online posts, calling for Chinese consumers to boycott these brands. Amid the boycotts, Chinese sportswear company Anta Sports announced it was exiting the BCI, citing their statement on Xinjiang as "seriously concerning". In addition TV platforms blurred the logos of companies which were part of the controversy. It is near impossible to get accurate information about the situation in Xinjiang domestically in China.

Hua Chunying has accused the United States of hypocrisy over the issue pointing to the legacy of racism in the United States particularly the history of slavery and exploitation of African Americans in the cotton fields of the American South. In March 2021 she tweeted two pictures side by side, one a historical photo of cotton farmers in Mississippi and the other a photo of three smiling workers collecting cotton in Xinjiang, with the caption "#Mississippi in 1908 vs #Xinjiang in 2015 A shotgun and several hounds vs smiles and harvests. Forced labor?"

In September 24, 2024, China raised the issue of cotton with PVH Corp.

===== United States =====
In July 2020, the United States passed the Uyghur Human Rights Policy Act, which instituted tracking and reporting requirements regarding China's abuses against Turkic Muslims and called for sanctions on individuals and organizations involved in the persecution thereof.

According to the United States Holocaust Memorial Museum, "[t]he US Department of Homeland Security detained shipments at United States ports of entry containing cotton and cotton products originating from the Xinjiang Production and Construction Corps based on credible information that these products were made using forced labor." In September 2020, the United States began to restrict the imports of cotton from Xinjiang. In January 2021, the United States banned the import of cotton produced in Xinjiang in a move aimed at pressuring the Chinese Government to end the persecution of Uyghurs in China.

The United States-based Uyghur Human Rights Project has described Xinjiang as a "cotton gulag".

===== Taiwan =====
In 2021, Taiwanese Legislative Speaker You Si-kun said that cotton from China's Xinjiang region was not just a political issue but was becoming a human rights issue.

Asked about the controversy, Taipei Mayor Ko Wen-je said that “The trade war between the US and China will certainly continue, but China still has to improve its human rights.”

===== United Kingdom =====
The London-based Anti-Slavery International has spoken out against conditions in the Xinjiang cotton industry and has pressured both businesses and governments to address the situation.

In April 2020, the World Uyghur Congress (WUC) presented to UK's National Crime Agency evidence of forced labour in Xinjiang and argued that the NCA should have investigated the UK's cotton proceeds under the Proceeds of Crime Act 2002 (POCA). The NCA declined investigation, after which the WUC challenged the NCA in court and was dismissed by the High Court in January 2023.

In June 2024, the Court of Appeal ruled that the National Crime Agency must reconsider whether to open an investigation into cotton from Xinjiang. In response, UK director of the WUC, Rahima Mahmut, called the decision "a monumental victory and a moral triumph"

==== Academic analysis ====
Zhun Xu (Associate Professor of Economics at John Jay College) and Fangfei Lin (Associate Professor in Sociology at Xinjiang University) write that there is insufficient support for claims of forced labor in Xinjiang. They cite the historic significance of Uyghur agricultural workers as a long-standing labor force for manual cotton harvesting and staffing companies' widespread recruitment of Uyghur workers due to lower travel costs. In their view, "... the labor demand of Uyghur seasonal cotton pickers in south Xinjiang is largely decided by its relatively low degree of agricultural capitalization, not due to the 'special treatment' towards labor migrants of a certain ethnic minority."

== See also ==
- China Cotton Association
