= China Grain Reserves Group =

State-owned company in Chengdu, China

- Sinograin headquarters in Beijing, China
- Trade name: SINOGRAIN
- Native name: 中储粮集团
- Type: State-owned enterprises
- Founded: 2000
- Headquarters: Tower A, Triumph Mansion, A143 Xizhimenwai Avenue, Xicheng District, Beijing
- Website: http://www.sinograin.com.cn/

China Grain Reserves Group (Chinese: 中储粮集团), previously referred to as China Grain Reserves Corporation, China Grain Reserve Management Corporation (CGRMC, CGR, SINOGRAIN, Chinese: 中国储备粮管理集团有限公司, 中储粮集团, 中储粮), is a substantial state-owned enterprise specializing in grain and oil storage, processing, trading, logistics, warehousing technology research and services, as well as the oversight and regulation of centralized grain and oil reserve safety. Established in 2000, it was previously referred to as the State Grain Reserve Bureau from March 1991 to April 2000.

China Grain Reserve Group, headquartered in Beijing, comprises 23 branches and 4 completely owned or managed companies as of 2015, with operations across the entire nation. It possesses 338 directly affiliated depots, tasked with the storage of centralized stockpiles of grain, oil, and cotton. The China National Grain Storage Corporation (CNDC) is a significant entity in China's grain and oil sector, tasked with the responsibility of regulating the nation's grain market as mandated by the State Council of the People's Republic of China.

== History ==
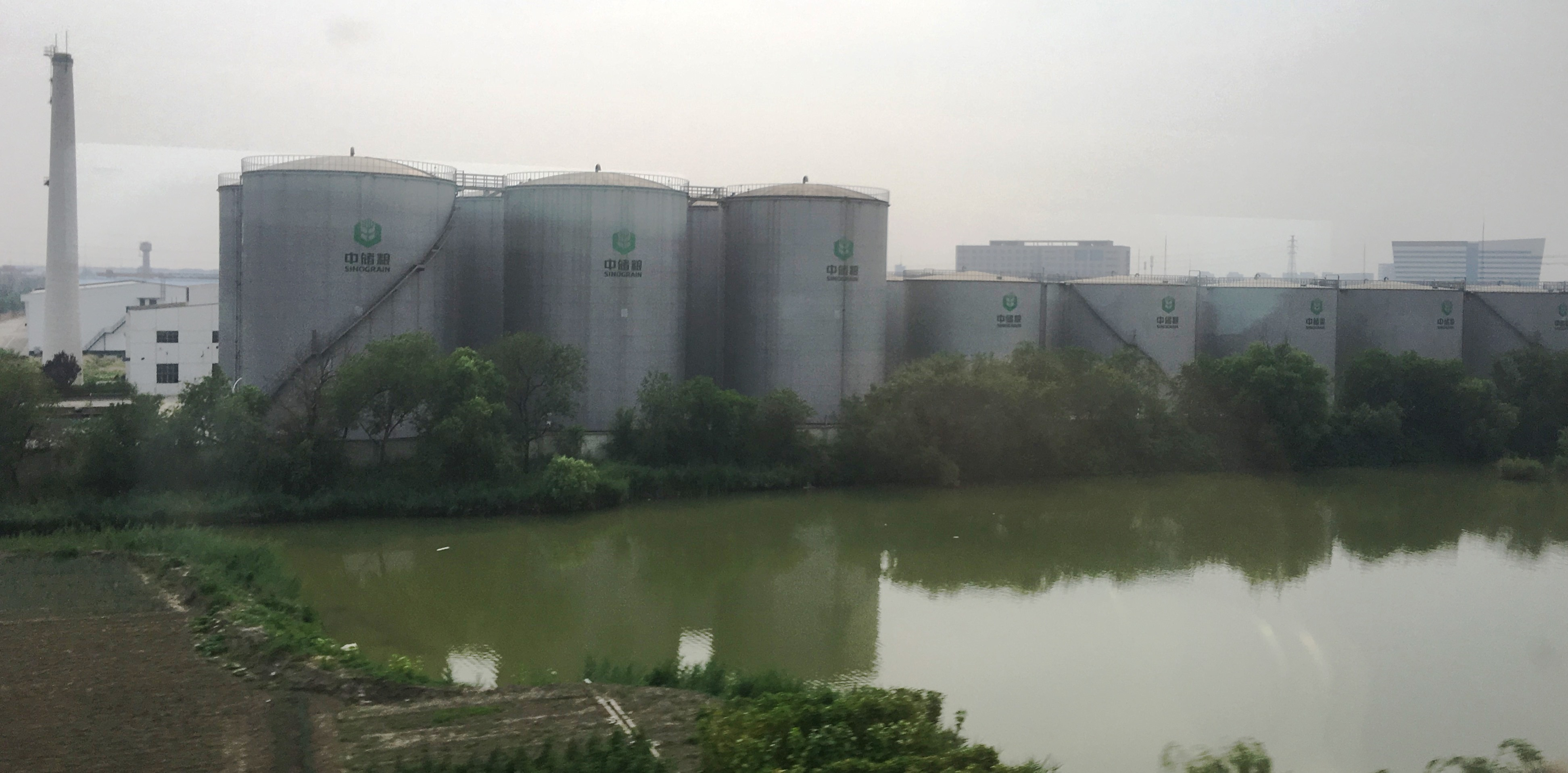
A SinoGrain warehouse in Tianjin

In 2000, China instituted a vertical management structure for central grain reserves, culminating in the formal establishment of the China Grain Reserve Management Corporation on May 18, tasked with the operation and management of these reserves.

On August 15, 2003, the State Council issued and implemented the "Regulations on the Management of the Central Grain Reserves" to enhance the administration of central grain reserves, ensure accurate quantity, high quality, and secure storage, safeguard farmers' interests, stabilize the grain market, and optimize the reserves' role in state macro-control. In that year, to satisfy market demand, SINOGRAIN released 800,000 tons of central reserve soybeans into the market. In 2005, to safeguard farmers' interests and ensure the stability of the grain market, the state adopted a minimum purchase price regulation in the primary grain-producing regions. The China Grain Reserves Group serves as the primary executor of the minimum purchase price policy, protecting the interests of grain producers and ensuring the stability of the grain market.

In 2007, the global grain market experienced significant price volatility. In the latter 2007, the SINOGRAIN released almost 5 million tons of central reserve rice, corn, and edible oils into the market, essentially stabilizing the prices. In 2008, the SINOGRAIN established the China National Grain Reserve Oils & Fats Company, which focused on the management of oils, fats, and oilseeds. Since 2008, the corporation has commenced the implementation of acquisition duties for corn, soybean, and rapeseed policies. On 12 May, following the 2008 Sichuan earthquake, the SINOGRAIN implemented emergency measures for the allocation of 630,000 tons of central grain and oil reserves, as well as 14,000 tons of central edible oil reserves.

In 2009, the corporation released 2.5 million tons of central reserve round-grained rice onto the market through a specific rotation, thereby contributing to the macro-control of food supply. In 2010, the SINOGRAIN executed the State Council's strategies for supply maintenance and price regulation, releasing a total of 83.71 million tons of policy grain and oil into the market to secure grain supply, stabilize overall price levels, and facilitate the smooth and healthy functioning of the national economy. In 2012, the China National Grain Storage Corporation constituted its board of directors.

In 2013, the SINOGRAIN advanced the reform of operational and logistical specialization, establishing the China National Grain and Cereals Storage and Logistics Company (CGCSL) to enhance reserve management and improve operational efficiency. On November 23, 2016, after the State Council's approval, the China National Cotton Reserves Corporation was amalgamated into the SINOGRAIN and became a wholly owned subsidiary of the latter. The newly established SINOGRAIN encompasses reserves of wheat, rice, corn, soybeans, edible oils, and additional types, thereby becoming the largest agricultural reserve entity in China.
