= State Administration for Industry and Commerce =

Administration of industry and commerce of China

- 国家工商行政管理总局
- National emblem of China

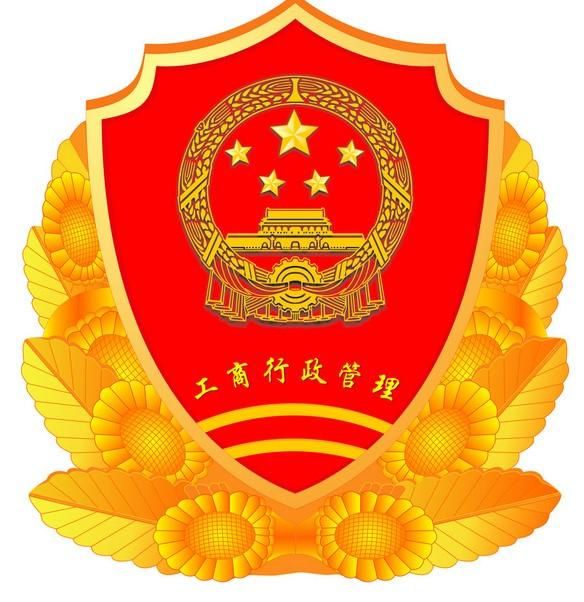
- Logo of SAIC

Agency overview
- Formed: 1953
- Jurisdiction: China
- Headquarters: Xicheng District, Beijing
- Minister responsible: Zhang Mao
- Parent agency: State Council of China
- Website: saic.gov.cn (archived)

The State Administration for Industry and Commerce (SAIC; Chinese: 国家工商行政管理总局) was a directly-affiliated institution of the State Council of China, responsible for the regulation of industry and commerce business entities in China.

The SAIC was merged into the newly created State Administration for Market Regulation in March 2018 as part of the deepening the reform of the Party and state institutions.

== Administration ==
The agency was organized into the following divisions:

- General Office
- Department of Law
- Antimonopoly and Anti-unfair Competition Enforcement Bureau
- Direct Selling Regulation Bureau
- Consumer Protection Bureau
- Department of Market Regulation
- Regulation Department for Market Circulation of Food
- Enterprise Registration Bureau
- Bureau for Registration of Foreign-Invested Enterprises
- Department of Advertising Regulation
- Department for Regulation of the Private Economy
- Department of Personnel
- Trademark Office
- Trademark Appeal Board

== Location ==
The head office of the agency is based in 8 Sanlihe Donglu, Xichengqu, Beijing, 100820, China. Locally, SAIC has offices on each regional and municipal level which oversee and regulate the businesses in their jurisdiction.

== See also ==
- List of company registers
