= Ministry of Civil Affairs =

Chinese governmental institution

Ministry of Civil Affairs of the People's Republic of China
- 中华人民共和国民政部; Zhōnghuá Rénmín Gònghéguó Mínzhèngbù
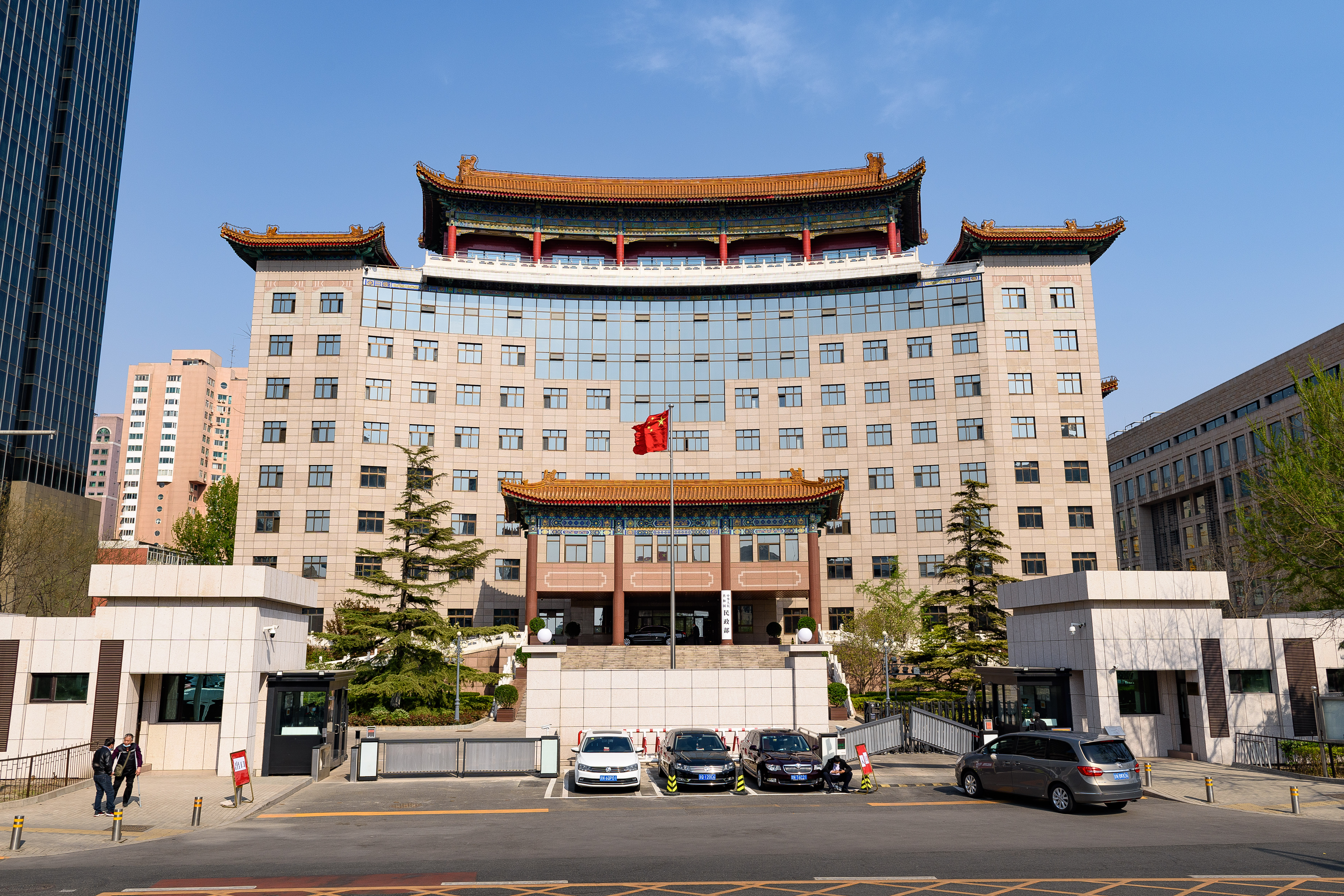

Agency overview
- Formed: November 1949; 76 years ago
- Type: Constituent Department of the State Council (cabinet-level executive department)
- Jurisdiction: Government of China
- Headquarters: Beijing
- Motto: 民政为民，民政爱民 (lit. 'Civil affairs for the people, Civil affairs love the people')
- Minister responsible: Lu Zhiyuan, Minister of Civil Affairs
- Deputy Ministers responsible: Tang Chengpei; Zhang Chunsheng; Zhan Chengfu; Li Baojun; Hu Haifeng
- Agency executives: Shen Xiaohui, Leader of Discipline Inspection & Supervision Team
- Parent agency: State Council
- Website: www.mca.gov.cn

The Ministry of Civil Affairs (Chinese: 中华人民共和国民政部) is a cabinet-level executive department of the State Council of China responsible for social and administrative affairs. It is the 10th-ranked department in the State Council. It was founded in its current form in May 1978, and the current minister is Lu Zhiyuan.

The Ministry's main duties are to "formulate development plans and policies for civil affairs; manage registration and monitor social groups, funds and private non-enterprise units; map out disaster response policies; organize and coordinate relief efforts; prepare social assistance plans, policies and standards; help with subsidies for urban and rural residents, medical and temporary assistance; formulate social welfare development plans, policies and standards; and develop policies related to marriage, burials and funerals."

The Ministry of Civil Affairs has overall responsibility for social assistance at the central level of government.

== History ==
=== 20th century ===
On 1 November 1949, the Ministry of the Interior of the Central People's Government (Chinese: 中央人民政府内务部) was established in accordance with the Organic Law of the Central People's Government of the People's Republic of China adopted at the First National Conference of the Chinese People's Political Consultative Conference on 27 September. In December 1968, the Ministry of the Interior has been abolished, and gave it the authority and responsibility to the Ministry of Finance and the Ministry of Public Security, respectively.

In February 1978, Cheng Zihua was responsible for the establishment of the Ministry of Civil Affairs. Members of the party group and vice ministers of the Ministry of Civil Affairs were deployed by the central government, while the cadres of department heads and below were deployed by the Organization Department of the Central Government and the Political and Industrial Group of the State Council. Cheng Zihua became the first minister and party secretary of the Ministry of Civil Affairs of the People's Republic of China. On May 20, 1978, the Ministry of Civil Affairs held its first party group meeting and formally started its office. From September 16 to 27, 1978, the Seventh National Conference on Civil Affairs was held in Beijing.

In March 1998, the State Council carried out institutional reforms and, in accordance with the program approved at the first meeting of the Ninth National People's Congress, transferred the rural social pension insurance intelligence of the Ministry of Civil Affairs to the Ministry of Labor and Social Security.

=== 21st Century ===
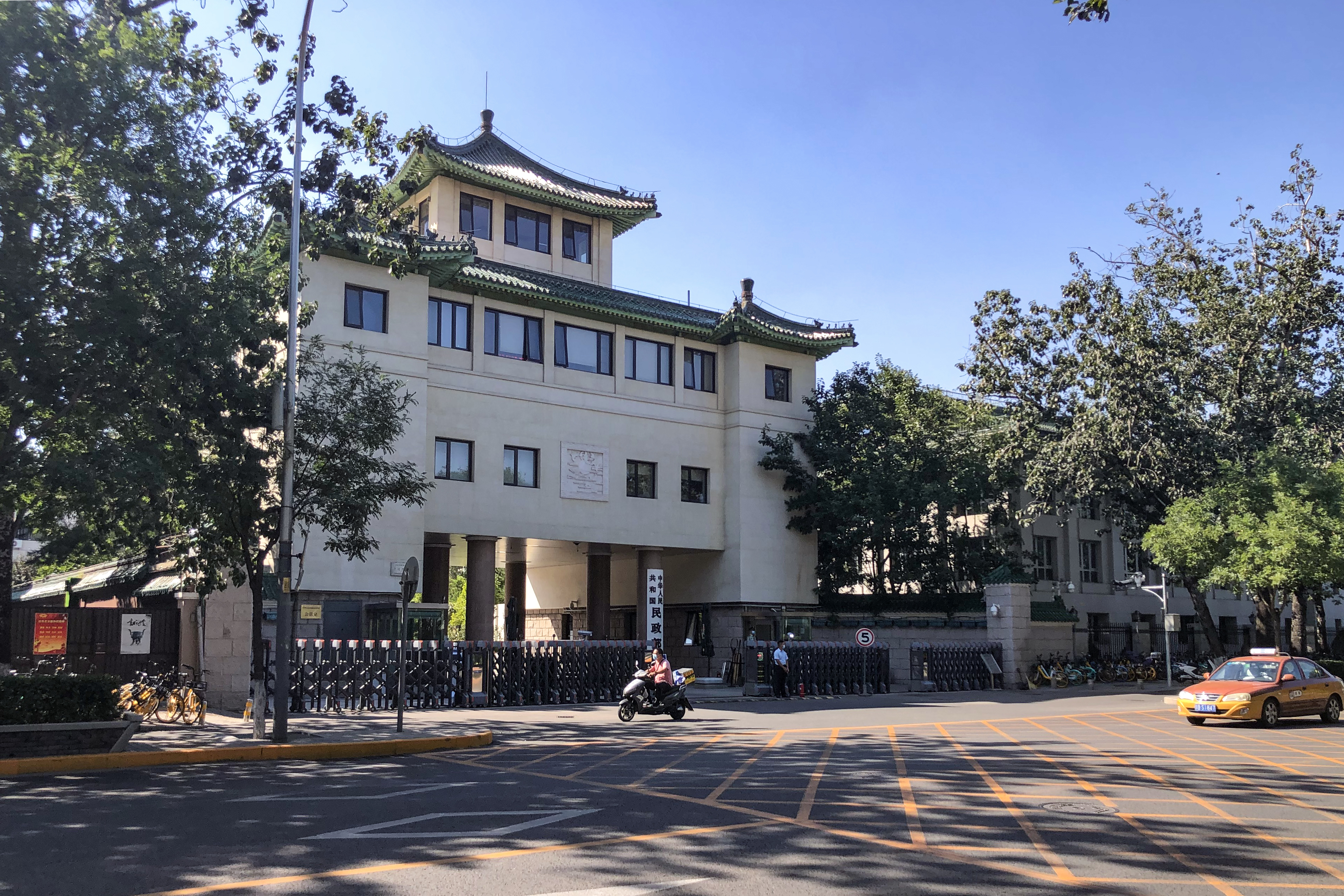
Office building of the Ministry of Civil Affairs of the People's Republic of China until 2021 (No. 147 Beiheyan Street)

On March 17, 2018, the First Meeting of the Thirteenth National People's Congress passed the Decision on the Institutional Reform Program of the State Council, approving the Institutional Reform Program of the State Council. Under this program, the Chinese Association of the Elderly, which was administered by the Ministry of Civil Affairs, was transferred to the National Health Commission, the responsibilities for the preferential treatment and resettlement of veterans were transferred to the newly established Ministry of Veterans' Affairs, the responsibilities for disaster relief were transferred to the newly established Ministry of Emergency Management, the responsibilities for medical assistance were transferred to the newly established National Healthcare Security Administration, and the responsibilities for the collection and storage, rotation, and day-to-day management of strategic and emergency reserve materials were transferred to the newly established National Food and Strategic Reserves Administration.

On August 31, 2020, according to the National Development and Reform Commission's Implementation Opinions on Comprehensively Pushing Forward the Reform of Delinking Industry Associations and Chambers of Commerce from Administrative Organs and the Notice on Doing a Good Job in Comprehensively Pushing Forward the Reform of Delinking National Industry Associations and Chambers of Commerce from Administrative Organs, 18 industry associations (chambers of commerce) such as the China Association of Professional Managers, which were formerly under the supervision of the Ministry of Civil Affairs, were separated from the Ministry of Civil Affairs, registered directly and operated independently in accordance with the law. Direct financial allocations to them will be canceled, and their development will be supported through government purchase of services and other means.

On January 1, 2021, the Ministry of Civil Affairs moved its office from No. 147 Beiheyan Street in Dongcheng District, Beijing (where the Supreme People's Procuratorate is located today) to No. 6 Jianguomen South Street in Chaoyang District, Beijing (the former site of the Standing Committee of the Beijing Municipal People's Congress).

On March 11, 2023, as part of the plan on reforming Party and state institutions, the competence of the work on the elderly was transferred to the Ministry of Civil Affairs.

== Internal organization ==
- General Office (International Cooperation Department)
- Policy and Regulation Department
- Planning and Finance Division
- Social Organization Administration Bureau

- Social Organization Law Enforcement Supervision Bureau

- Department of Social Assistance
- Division of Zoning and Place Names
- Department of Social Affairs
- Department for Aging
- Department of Aged Care Services
- Child Welfare Division
- Charity Promotion Department
- Institutional Party Committee (Personnel Department)
- Retired Cadres Bureau

== See also ==
- China Civil Affairs University
- Administrative divisions of China
- Urban planning in China
- Urban Planning Society of China
- Chinese Public Administration Society
- China Center of Adoption Affairs
