= National Healthcare Security Administration =

Chinese government agency

Nation Healthcare Security Administration
- 国家医疗保障局
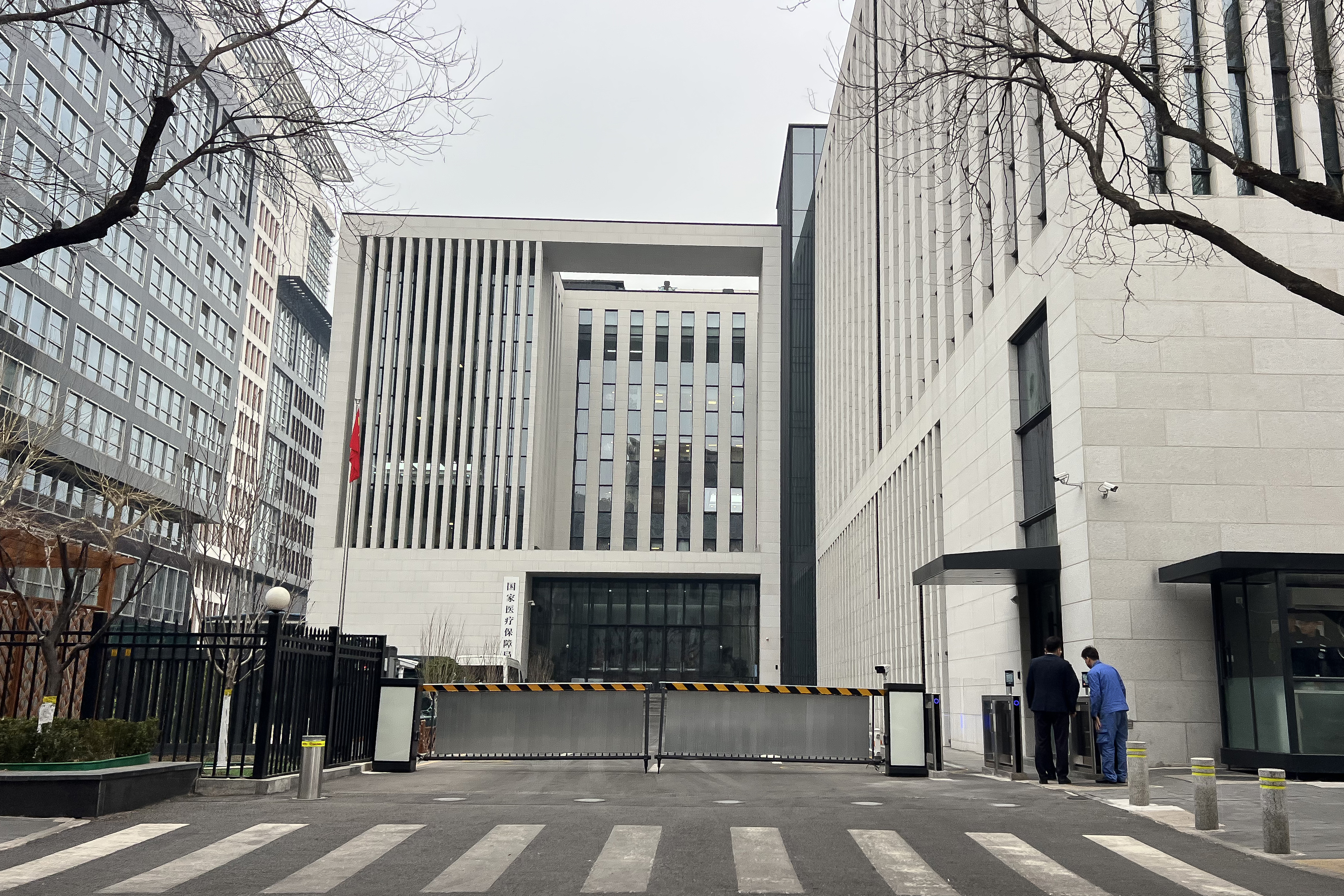
- Headquarters of the NHSA

Agency overview
- Formed: March 17, 2018; 8 years ago
- Jurisdiction: China
- Headquarters: Building 9, Yard 2, Yuetan North Street, Xicheng District, Beijing
- Agency executive: Zhang Ke, Director
- Parent agency: State Council
- Website: www.nhsa.gov.cn

The Nation Healthcare Security Administration (Chinese: 国家医疗保障局), abbreviated as NHSA (Chinese: 医保局) is a deputy-ministerial-level government agency directly under the State Council of the People's Republic of China. The current director is Zhang Ke.

== History ==
The administration was created in 2018 as part of the deepening the reform of the Party and state institutions.

== Functions ==
NHSA primarily oversees the state-backed China Healthcare Security including general health insurance plan, maternity insurance, and medical aid programs. In doing that, it oversees the operation of the insurance fund, responsible for centralized purchasing of drugs and medical supplies. It is also responsible for the public-sector healthcare reform.

The National Healthcare Security Administration guides local governments on issues related to medical insurance and sickness and maternity insurance.

== Leadership ==
=== Directors ===
Name	Chinese name	Took office	Left office	Ref.
Hu Jinglin	胡静林	May 2018	December 2023	
Zhang Ke	章轲	February 2024	Incumbent	
