= National Food and Strategic Reserves Administration =

Government agency of China

- 国家粮食和物资储备局
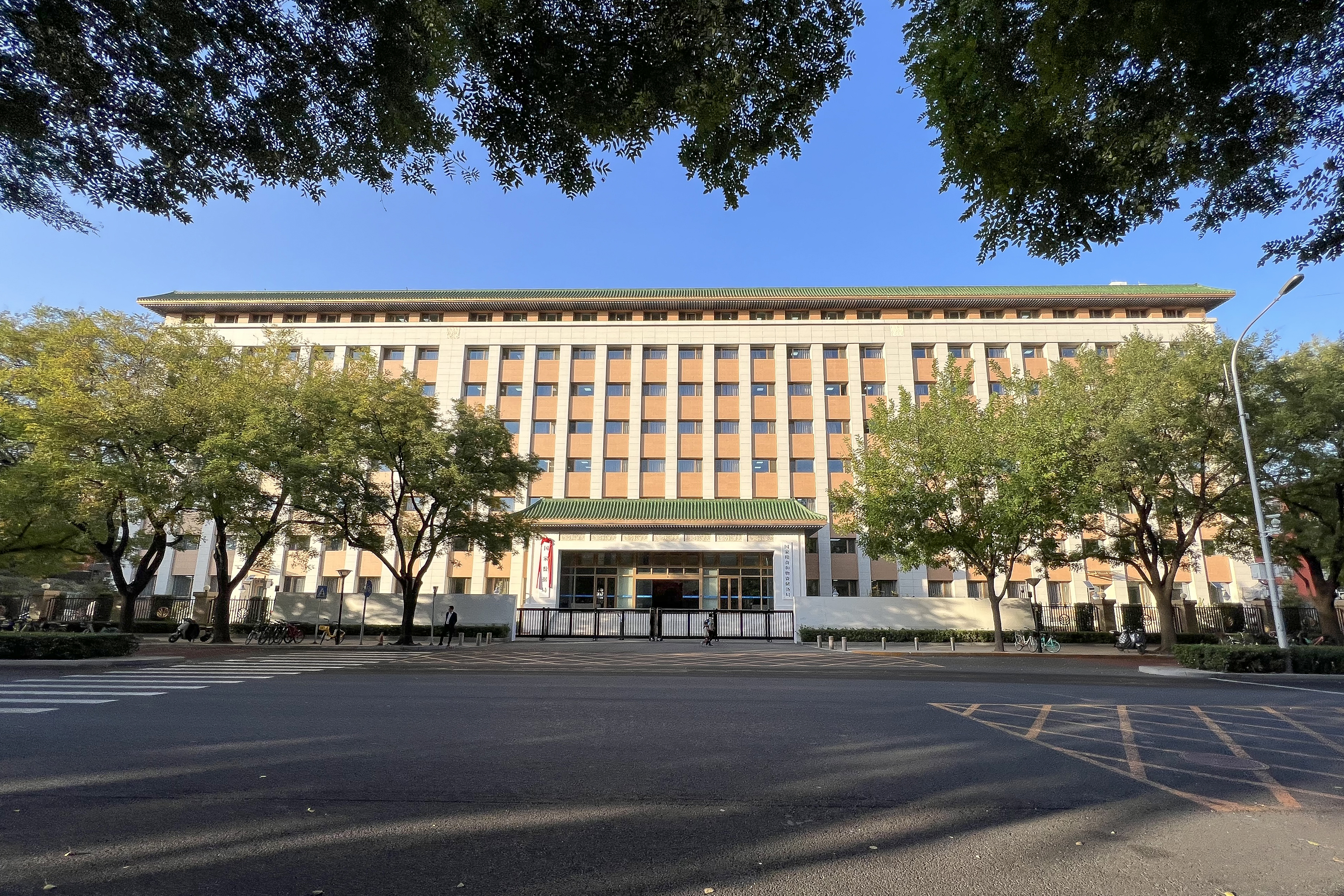
- National Food and Strategic Reserves Administration housed at the National Development and Reform Commission

Agency overview
- Formed: March 17, 2018; 8 years ago
- Jurisdiction: China
- Headquarters: 25 Yuetan North Street, Xicheng District, Beijing
- Agency executive: Liu Huanxin, Director
- Parent agency: National Development and Reform Commission
- Website: www.lswz.gov.cn

The National Food and Strategic Reserves Administration (Chinese: 国家粮食和物资储备局) is a deputy ministerial-level national agency administered by the National Development and Reform Commission of the People's Republic of China. Its mandate is to stockpile strategic resources and intervene in markets using this stockpile when necessary.

== History ==
The National Food and Strategic Reserves Administration is established in March 2018 as part of the deepening the reform of the Party and state institutions. The National Development and Reform Commission is responsible for management. Concurrently, the State Grain Bureau was abolished.

On April 4, 2018, the National Food and Strategic Reserves Administration was inaugurated.

As the State Reserve Bureau in 2005, it released 80,000 tonnes of copper into the global market amid rapidly rising copper prices. In 2019, the Administration released pork onto the market following a swine flu outbreak. In 2021, the Administration released 110,000 tonnes of copper into the global market.

== Leadership ==
=== Directors ===
Name	Chinese name	Took office	Left office	Ref.
Zhang Wufeng	张务锋	April 2018	June 2022	
Cong Liang	丛亮	2 July 2022	30 August 2023	
Liu Huanxin	刘焕鑫	30 August 2023	Incumbent	
