= List of presidential orders during the 14th National People's Congress =

The first session of the 14th National People's Congress (NPC) was held in Beijing from 5 to 13 March 2023, where Xi Jinping was re-elected as president. During the 14th NPC, as of February 2026, Xi issued a total of 73 presidential orders. The first was issued on 11 March 2023, appointing Li Qiang as Premier of the State Council. The latest presidential decree was issued on 12 March 2026. This list details the presidential decrees issued during the 14th NPC.

== List ==
List of Presidential Decrees of the People's Republic of China issued during the 14th National People's Congress
Number	Content	Date signed	Ref.
1	Appointed Li Qiang as the Premier of the State Council.	11 March 2023	
2	Appointed Ding Xuexiang, He Lifeng, Zhang Guoqing, and Liu Guozhong as Vice Premiers of the State Council; Li Shangfu, Wang Xiaohong, Wu Zhenglong, Shen Yiqin, and Qin Gang as State Councilors; Wu Zhenglong as Secretary-General of the State Council; Qin Gang as Minister of Foreign Affairs; Li Shangfu as Minister of National Defense; Zheng Shanjie as Director of the National Development and Reform Commission; Huai Jinpeng as Minister of Education; Wang Zhigang as Minister of Science and Technology; Jin Zhuanglong as Minister of Industry and Information Technology; Pan Yue as Director of the National Ethnic Affairs Commission; Wang Xiaohong as Minister of Public Security; Chen Yixin as Minister of State Security; Tang Dengjie as Minister of Civil Affairs; He Rong as Minister of Justice; Liu Kun as Minister of Finance; Wang Xiaoping as Minister of Human Resources and Social Security; Wang Guanghua as Minister of Natural Resources; Huang Runqiu as Minister of Ecology and Environment; Ni Hong as Minister of Housing and Urban-Rural Development; Li Xiaopeng as Minister of Transport; Li Guoying as Minister of Water Resources; Tang Renjian as Minister of Agriculture and Rural Affairs; Wang Wentao as Minister of Commerce; Hu Heping as Minister of Culture and Tourism; Ma Xiaowei as Director of the National Health Commission; Pei Jinjia as Minister of Veterans Affairs; Wang Xiangxi as Minister of Emergency Management; Yi Gang as Governor of the People's Bank of China; and Hou Kai as Auditor General of the National Audit Office.	12 March 2023	
3	Promulgated the Decision on Amending the Legislation Law of the People's Republic of China.	13 March 2023	
4	Promulgated the revised version of the Counterespionage Law of the People's Republic of China.	26 April 2023	
5	Promulgated the Ecological Protection Law of the Qinghai-Tibet Plateau of the People's Republic of China.	26 April 2023	
6	Promulgated the Law of the People's Republic of China on the Construction of Barrier-Free Environment.	28 June 2023	
7	Promulgated the Law of the People's Republic of China on Foreign Relations.	28 June 2023	
8	Relieved Qin Gang and appointed Wang Yi as the Minister of Foreign Affairs. Relieved Yi Gang and appointed Pan Gongsheng as the Governor of the People's Bank of China.	25 July 2023	
9	Promulgated the revised version of the Administrative Reconsideration Law of the People's Republic of China.	1 September 2023	
10	Promulgated the Foreign State Immunities Law of the People's Republic of China.	1 September 2023	
11	Promulgated the Decision on Amending the Civil Procedure Law of the People's Republic of China.	1 September 2023	
12	Promulgated the revised version of the Marine Environmental Protection Law of the People's Republic of China.	24 October 2023	
13	Promulgated the Patriotic Education Law of the People's Republic of China.	24 October 2023	
14	Removed Li Shangfu as State Councilor and Minister of National Defense; removed Qin Gang as State Councilor; removed Wang Zhigang and appointed Yin Hejun as the Minister of Science and Technology; removed Liu Kun and appointed Lan Fo'an as the Minister of Finance.	24 October 2023	
15	Promulgated the revised version of the Company Law of the People's Republic of China.	29 December 2023	
16	Promulgated the Decision on Amending the Charity Law of the People's Republic of China.	29 December 2023	
17	Promulgated the Food Security Law of the People's Republic of China	29 December 2023	
18	Promulgated the Amendment (XII) to the Criminal Law of the People's Republic of China	29 December 2023	
19	Appointed Dong Jun as the Minister of National Defense. Removed Tang Dengjie and appointed Lu Zhiyuan as the Minister of Civil Affairs; removed Hu Heping and appointed Sun Yeli as the Minister of Culture and Tourism.	29 December 2023	
20	Promulgated the revised version of the Law of the People's Republic of China on Guarding State Secrets.	27 February 2024	
21	Promulgated the revised version of the Organic Law of the State Council.	11 March 2024	
22	Promulgated the Academic Degree Law of the People's Republic of China.	26 April 2024	
23	Promulgated the Customs Law of the People's Republic of China.	26 April 2024	
24	Promulgated the decision to amend the Agricultural Technology Extension Law of the People's Republic of China, the Law of the People's Republic of China on the Protection of Minors, and the Biosecurity Law of the People's Republic of China.	26 April 2024	
25	Promulgated the revised version of the Emergency Response Law of the People's Republic of China.	28 June 2024	
26	Promulgated the Law of the People's Republic of China on Rural Collective Economic Organizations.	28 June 2024	
27	Promulgated the revised version of the Frontier Health and Quarantine Law of the People's Republic of China.	28 June 2024	
28	Promulgated the Decision on Amending the Accounting Law of the People's Republic of China.	28 June 2024	
29	Removed Ma Xiaowei and appointed Lei Haichao as the Director of the National Health Commission	28 June 2024	
30	Promulgated the revised version of the National Defense Education Law of the People's Republic of China.	13 September 2024	
31	Promulgated the Decision on Amending the Statistics Law of the People's Republic of China.	13 September 2024	
32	Awarded Wang Yongzhi, Wang Zhenyi, Li Zhensheng, and Huang Zongde the Medal of the Republic; awarded Dilma Rousseff the Friendship Medal; awarded Wang Xiaomo and Zhao Zhongxian the national honorary title of "People's Scientist"; awarded Bayika Kelidibek the national honorary title of "People's Guardian"; awarded Tian Hua he national honorary title of "People's Artist"; awarded Xu Zhenchao the national honorary title of "People's Craftsman"; awarded Zhang Jinfan and Huang Danian the national honorary title of "People's Educator"; awarded Lu Shengmei the national honorary title of "People's Medical Worker"; awarded Zhang Zhuoyuan the national honorary title of "Outstanding Contributor to Economic Research"; and awarded Zhang Xielin the national honorary title of "Outstanding Contributor to Sports Work."	13 September 2024	
33	Removed Tang Renjian and appointed Han Jun as the Minister of Agriculture and Rural Affairs.	13 September 2024	
34	Promulgated the Preschool Education Law of the People's Republic of China.	8 November 2024	
35	Promulgated the revised version of the Law of the People's Republic of China on the Protection of Cultural Relics.	8 November 2024	
36	Promulgated the revised version of the Mineral Resources Law of the People's Republic of China.	8 November 2024	
37	Promulgated the Energy Law of the People's Republic of China.	8 November 2024	
38	Promulgated the revised version of the Anti-Money Laundering Law of the People's Republic of China.	8 November 2024	
39	Promulgated the Decision on Amending the Supervision Law of the Standing Committees of the People's Congresses at All Levels of the People's Republic of China.	8 November 2024	
40	Removed Li Xiaopeng and appointed Liu Wei as the Minister of Transport.	8 November 2024	
41	Promulgated the Value-Added Tax Law of the People's Republic of China.	25 December 2024	
42	Promulgated the Decision on Amending the Supervision Law of the People's Republic of China.	25 December 2024	
43	Promulgated the Law of the People's Republic of China on Popularization of Science and Technology.	25 December 2024	
44	Removed Wang Guanghua and appointed Guan Zhi'ou as the Minister of Natural Resources.	25 December 2024	
45	Promulgated the Decision on Amending the Law of the People's Republic of China on Deputies to the National People's Congress and Local People's Congresses at Various Levels.	11 March 2025	
46	Promulgated the Private Sector Promotion Law of the People's Republic of China.	30 April 2025	
47	Promulgated the Law of the People's Republic of China on the Prevention and Control of Infectious Diseases.	30 April 2025	
48	Removed Jin Zhuanglong and appointed Li Lecheng as the Minister of Industry and Information Technology.	30 April 2025	
49	Promulgated the Law of the People's Republic of China on Penalties for Administration of Public Security.	27 June 2025	
50	Promulgated the Anti-Unfair Competition Law of the People's Republic of China.	27 June 2025	
51	Promulgated the Atomic Energy Law of the People's Republic of China.	12 September 2025	
52	Promulgated the Emergency Response Law of the People's Republic of China.	12 September 2025	
53	Promulgated the National Park Law of the People's Republic of China.	12 September 2025	
54	Promulgated the revised version of the Arbitration Law of the People's Republic of China.	12 September 2025	
55	Promulgated the Law of the People's Republic of China on Publicity and Education of the Rule of Law.	12 September 2025	
56	Promulgated the Decision on Amending the Food Safety Law of the People's Republic of China.	12 September 2025	
57	Removed Pan Yue and appointed Chen Ruifeng as the Director of the State Ethnic Affairs Commission.	12 September 2025	
58	Promulgated the revised version of the Maritime Law of the People's Republic of China.	28 October 2025	
59	Promulgated the Decision on Amending the Organic Law of the Villagers' Committees of the People's Republic of China.	28 October 2025	
60	Promulgated the revised version of the Organic Law of the Urban Residents' Committees of the People's Republic of China.	28 October 2025	
61	Promulgated the Decision on Amending the Cybersecurity Law of the People's Republic of China.	28 October 2025	
62	Promulgated the Decision on Amending the Environmental Protection Tax Law of the People's Republic of China.	28 October 2025	
63	Promulgated the revised version of the Fisheries Law of the People's Republic of China.	27 December 2025	
64	Promulgated the Law of the People's Republic of China on the Safety of Hazardous Chemicals.	27 December 2025	
65	Promulgated the revised version of the Civil Aviation Law of the People's Republic of China.	27 December 2025	
66	Promulgated the revised version of the Law of the People's Republic of China on the Standard Spoken and Written Chinese Language.	27 December 2025	
67	Promulgated the revised version of the Foreign Trade Law of the People's Republic of China.	27 December 2025	
68	Repealed the Law of the People's Republic of China on Township and Village Enterprises and the Decision of the Standing Committee of the National People's Congress on the Provisional Regulations on Value-Added Tax, Consumption Tax, Business Tax and Other Taxes Applicable to Foreign-Invested Enterprises and Foreign Enterprises.	27 December 2025	
69	Removed Wang Xiangxi as Minister of Emergency Management.	26 February 2026	
70	Promulgated the Ecological and Environmental Protection Law of the People's Republic of China.	12 March 2026	
71	Promulgated the Law of the People's Republic of China on Promoting Ethnic Unity and Progress.	12 March 2026	
72	Promulgated the Law of the People's Republic of China on National Development Planning.	12 March 2026	
73	Repealed the Law of the People's Republic of China on Industrial Enterprises Owned by the Whole People.	12 March 2026	

== See also ==
- List of presidential orders during the 12th National People's Congress
- List of presidential orders during the 13th National People's Congress
