= Order of the President of China =

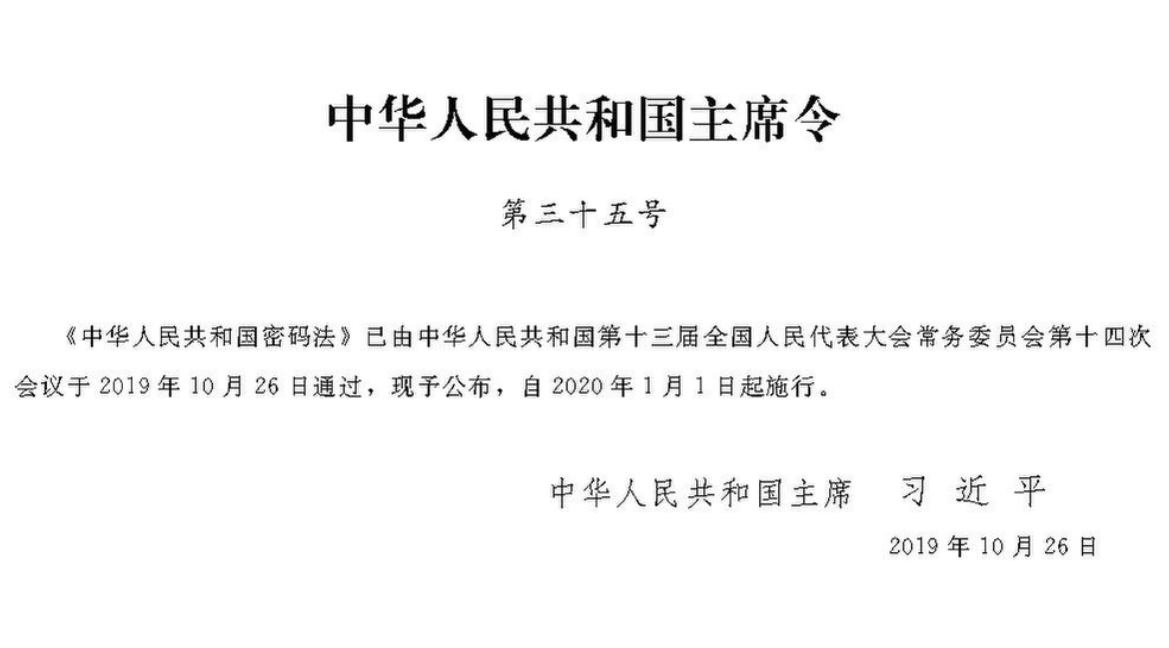
Presidential Order signed by Xi Jinping on October 26, 2019

The Order of the President of the People's Republic of China is a decree issued by the President of China in accordance with the Article 80 of the Constitution of China and based on the decisions of the National People's Congress and its Standing Committee. It is used to promulgate laws, appoint and remove members of the State Council, confer state medals or honors, declare a state of emergency or a state of war, or issue amnesty orders or mobilization orders. Presidential Orders have been issued by the President since the Constitution of the People's Republic of China was enacted in 1954. The position of the President was vacant and abolished for a time until it was restored at the fourth session of the 5th National People's Congress in 1982. Presidential Orders are believed to record the powers granted to the President by the Constitution and reflect the trajectory of China's legal system construction.

== History ==
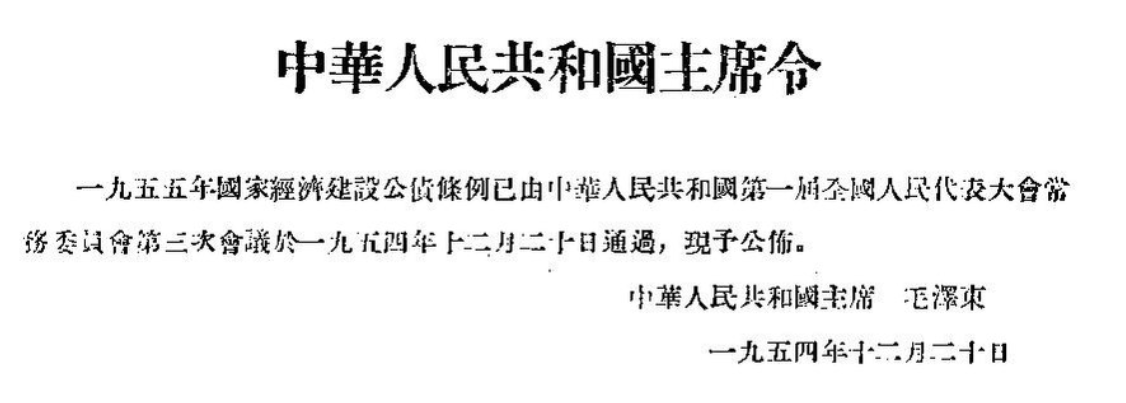
An Order signed by Mao Zedong on December 20, 1954

"Order" is one of the oldest types of Chinese administrative documents and the only type of official document in China that has been used since the pre-Qin dynasty period. On 27 September 1949, on the eve of the proclamation of the People's Republic of China, the first plenary session of the Chinese People's Political Consultative Conference passed the Organic Law of the Central People's Government. On 30 September, the Central People's Government Council, along with its Chairman and Vice Chairpersons, was elected. On 1 October, the Central People's Government Council held its first meeting in the Qinzheng Hall of Zhongnanhai and announced that the Central People's Government had officially assumed its new office. The Chairman, Vice Chairman and members of the Central People's Government took office. After that, Mao Zedong signed a number of "Orders of the Chairman of the Central People's Government" or "Orders of the Central People's Government" in the name of the Chairman of the Central People's Government. For example, on 30 April 1950, Chairman Mao signed the Order of the Chairman of the Central People's Government to promulgate the Marriage Law of the People's Republic of China. On 20 September 1950, the Central People's Government issued the "Order of the Central People's Government on the Promulgation of the National Emblem of the People's Republic of China", which determined the design, explanation and use of the national emblem. Mao Zedong, in the name of the Chairman of the Central People's Government, promulgated the order:

The design of the national emblem of the People's Republic of China proposed at the Second Session of the First National Committee of the Chinese People's Political Consultative Conference and the explanation of the design have been adopted at the Eighth Session of the Central People's Government Committee. They are hereby promulgated.

— Chairman Mao Zedong, 20 September 1950

During this period, personnel appointments were handled by the Central People's Government Council and the Government Administration Council. On 20 September 1954, the first session of the 1st National People's Congress was held. The Constitution of the People's Republic of China was adopted at the meeting. Article 40 of the Constitution provided:

Article 40: The President of the People's Republic of China, in accordance with the decisions of the National People's Congress and its Standing Committee, promulgates laws and decrees, appoints and removes the Premier, Vice Premiers, Ministers of various ministries, Directors of various committees, and the Secretary General of the State Council, appoints and removes the Vice Chairman and members of the National Defense Council, confers State medals and honorary titles, issues general and special amnesty orders, issues martial law orders, declares a state of war, and issues mobilization orders.

The position of the Chairman of the People's Republic of China was officially established. Chairman Mao and Liu Shaoqi successively issued the "Order of the Chairman of the People's Republic of China" during their term of office. After the outbreak of the Cultural Revolution in 1966, Liu Shaoqi was targeted and quickly lost power. At the 12th Plenary Session of the CCP Central Committee in 1968, Liu Shaoqi removed from all positions within and outside the party and expelled from the party. In October of the following year, Liu Shaoqi died of illness due to persecution. After his death, the position of the State Chairman became vacant. The two Vice Chairpersons of the People's Republic of China at that time, Soong Ching-ling and Dong Biwu, acted as the Chairman, but did not succeed the Chairman as Vice Chairpersons. The subsequent dispute over the abolition of the chairmanship ended with the direct deletion of Chapter 2, Section 2 of the Constitution, and the Chairman of the People's Republic of China was officially abolished. During the period when the position of the Chairman was vacant and abolished, the "Order of the Standing Committee of the National People's Congress" and the "Order of the Chairman of the Standing Committee of the National People's Congress " replaced the Order of the President of the People's Republic of China.

On 4 December 1982 the fifth session of the 5th National People's Congress adopted the fourth Constitution since the founding of the PRC, which re-established the positions of President and Vice President. Although the President became a figurehead and had no power to veto the decisions of the National People's Congress and its Standing Committee, they still had the responsibility to promulgate laws. Starting from the 6th National People's Congress, the Presidential Order was restored.

== List ==
Session	President	Number of orders	Term start	Term end
1st	Mao Zedong		1954	1959
2nd	Liu Shaoqi		1959	1965
3rd	Liu Shaoqi		1965	1968
4th	The presidency vacant and abolished			
5th	The presidency vacant and abolished			
6th	Li Xiannian	65	18 June 1983	12 March 1988
7th	Yang Shangkun	72	9 April 1988	22 February 1993
8th	Jiang Zemin	94	28 March 1993	29 December 199
9th	Jiang Zemin	85	17 March 1998	28 February 2003
10th	Hu Jintao	87	16 March 2003	28 February 2008
11th	Hu Jintao	75	16 March 2008	28 December 2012
12th	Xi Jinping	86	15 March 2013	27 December 2017
13th	Xi Jinping	130	18 March 2018	24 February 2023
14th	Xi Jinping	Incumbent	11 March 2023	Incumbent
