= Wang Xiangxi =

Chinese business executive and politician

- 王祥喜

Minister of Emergency Management
- In office 29 July 2022 – 26 February 2026
- Premier: Li Keqiang; Li Qiang
- Preceded by: Huang Ming
- Succeeded by: Zhang Chengzhong

Personal details
- Born: August 1962 (age 64) Mianyang County, Hubei, China
- Party: Chinese Communist Party (1987-2026, expelled)
- Education: Henan Polytechnic University

Wang Xiangxi (Chinese: 王祥喜; pinyin: Wáng Xiángxǐ; born August 1962) is a Chinese business executive and politician who served as the Minister of Emergency Management from July 2022 to January 2026.

He was a delegate to the 11th National People's Congress. In 2026, Wang was expelled from the Chinese Communist Party.

== Early life and education ==
Wang was born in Mianyang County (now Xiantao), Hubei, in August 1962. After resuming the college entrance examination, in 1979, he enrolled at Jiaozuo Coal Mining School (now Henan Polytechnic University), majoring in coal mining engineering.

== Career in Hubei ==
After graduating in 1983, he was assigned to the Songyi Mining Bureau, and eventually becoming first deputy director in March 1995. He joined the Chinese Communist Party (CCP) in April 1987. He successively served as deputy head of the Hubei Provincial Coal Industry Department in June 1996, director of the Hubei Coal Industry Management Office in February 2002, deputy director of the Hubei Provincial Economic and Trade Commission in August 2000, and director of the Hubei Provincial Quality and Technical Supervision Bureau in April 2003. In June 2006, he was named acting mayor of Jingzhou, confirmed in March 2007. In May 2010, he was appointed party secretary of Suizhou, in addition to serving as chairperson of its People's Congress. In July 2012, he was made secretary-general of Hubei Provincial People's Government, concurrently serving as director of the General Office of Hubei Provincial People's Government. He was admitted to member of the Standing Committee of the CCP Hubei Provincial Committee, the province's top authority, in June 2017, and appointed secretary of the Political and Legal Affairs Commission of the Hubei Provincial Committee of the Chinese Communist Party.

== Career in state enterprise ==
In March 2019, he was chosen as chairman and party branch secretary of the China Energy Investment, a state-owned mining and energy company administrated by the SASAC of the State Council of the People's Republic of China.

== Career in central government ==
On 29 July 2022, he was promoted to become the minister of emergency management, succeeding Huang Ming.

== Investigation ==
On 31 January 2026, Wang was put under investigation for alleged "serious violations of discipline and laws" by the Central Commission for Discipline Inspection (CCDI), the party's internal disciplinary body, and the National Supervisory Commission, the highest anti-corruption agency of China. His post was removed on 26 February 2026, which was signed by Xi Jinping under the 69th order of the President. Wang was expelled from the party and dismissed from public office on 8 September 2026. On 29 October 2026, the fifth plenary session of the 20th CCP Central Committee reviewed and approved the report of the CCDI on the "serious violations of discipline and law" by Wang and confirmed the Politburo decision to expel him from the CCP.

Government offices
Preceded by Ying Daiming	Mayor of Jingzhou; 2006–2010	Succeeded by Li Jianming
Party political offices
Preceded by Ma Daoming	Communist Party Secretary of Suizhou; 2010–2012	Succeeded by Liu Xiaoming
Preceded by Wang Xiaodong	Secretary of the Political and Legal Affairs Commission of the Hubei Provincial Committee of the Chinese Communist Party; 2017–2019	Succeeded by Luo Yonggang
Government offices
Preceded by Fu Dehui	Secretary-General of Hubei Provincial People's Government; 2012–2017	Succeeded by Bie Bixiong
Preceded by Huang Ming	Minister of Emergency Management; 2022–2026	Succeeded by Zhang Chengzhong
Business positions
Preceded by Qiao Baoping	Chairman of the China Energy Investment; 2019–2022	Succeeded by Liu Guoyue
