= Huang Ming (politician) =

Chinese politician

- 黄明

Minister of Emergency Management
- In office 19 March 2018 – 2 September 2022
- Premier: Li Keqiang
- Preceded by: New title
- Succeeded by: Wang Xiangxi

Personal details
- Born: October 1957 (age 68–69) Xinghua, Jiangsu, China
- Party: Chinese Communist Party
- Education: Jiangsu Police Academy; Nanjing Normal University

Huang Ming (simplified Chinese: 黄明; traditional Chinese: 黃明; pinyin: Huáng Míng; born October 1957) is a Chinese politician who served as Minister of Emergency Management.

== Biography ==
Huang was born in Xinghua, Jiangsu Province in October 1957. He became involved in politics in 1975. From August 1975 to December 1978, Huang worked in Xinghua County.

In December 1978, after Resumption of University Entrance Examination, Huang was accepted to Jiangsu Police Academy and graduated in 1982, and he was graduated from Nanjing Normal University in 1995.

From 1982 to 2000, Huang worked in Jiangsu Public Security Office. In 2000 he was promoted to become the Deputy Director of Jiangsu Public Security Office, a position he held until 2003. From April 2003 to November 2008, Huang was promoted to become the Director of Jiangsu Public Security Office. In August 2009, he was appointed the Deputy Minister of Public Security.

In April 2016, he assumed the roles of Deputy Secretary of the Party Committee, Vice Minister of the Ministry of Public Security, and Director of the Central Leading Group on Dealing with Heretical Religions, all at the full ministerial level, subsequently succeeding Fu Zhenghua as a member of the CCP Central Committee's Political and Legal Committee.

In March 2018, he was appointed secretary of the party group and deputy minister of the newly formed Ministry of Emergency Management. In March 2020, he assumed the role of secretary of the party committee of the MEM. On April 29, 2021, the twenty-eighth session of the Standing Committee of the 13th National People's Congress resolved to designate Huang Ming as the minister of the Ministry of Emergency Management.

On July 29, 2022, he relinquished the role of party secretary of the Ministry of Emergency Management. On August 24, he was appointed as a member of the 13th National Committee of the Chinese People's Political Consultative Conference (CPPCC) and as deputy director of the Committee of Social and Legal Affairs of the CPPCC. On September 2, he was dismissed from the role of Minister of Emergency Management.

In March 2023, he assumed the position of vice chairman of the Constitution and Law Committee of the 14th National People's Congress.

Party political offices
Preceded by Fu Zhenghua	Director of the Central Leading Group on Dealing with Heretical Religions; 2016–2018	Succeeded by Position revoked
Government offices
Preceded by Wang Yupu	Minister of Emergency Management; 2021–2022	Succeeded by Wang Xiangxi
