= List of presidential orders during the 13th National People's Congress =

The first session of the 13th National People's Congress (NPC) was held in Beijing from March 5 to March 20, 2018, where Xi Jinping was re-elected as president. During the 13th NPC, Xi issued a total of 130 presidential decrees. The first was issued on March 18, 2018, appointing Li Keqiang as Premier of the State Council. The last presidential decree during the Thirteenth NPC (No. 130) was issued on February 24, 2023, removing Tang Yijun from the post of Minister of Justice and appointing He Rong.

== List ==
List of Presidential Decrees of the People's Republic of China issued during the 13th National People's Congress
| Number | Content | Date signed | Ref. |
|---|---|---|---|
| 1 | Appointed Li Keqiang as the Premier of the State Council. | 18 March 2018 | |
| 2 | Han Zheng, Sun Chunlan (female), Hu Chunhua, and Liu He were appointed Vice Premiers of the State Council; Wei Fenghe, Wang Yong, Wang Yi, Xiao Jie, and Zhao Kezhi were appointed State Councilors; Xiao Jie (concurrently) was appointed Secretary-General of the State Council; Wang Yi (concurrently) was appointed Minister of Foreign Affairs; Wei Fenghe (concurrently) was appointed Minister of National Defense; He Lifeng was appointed Director of the National Development and Reform Commission; Chen Baosheng was appointed Minister of Education; Wang Zhigang was appointed Minister of Science and Technology; Miao Wei was appointed Minister of Industry and Information Technology; Batel (Mongolian) was appointed Director of the State Ethnic Affairs Commission; Zhao Kezhi (concurrently) was appointed Minister of Public Security; Chen Wenqing was appointed Minister of State Security; Huang Shuxian was appointed Minister of Civil Affairs; and Fu Zhenghua was appointed... Minister of Justice; Liu Kun appointed Minister of Finance; Zhang Jinan appointed Minister of Human Resources and Social Security; Lu Hao appointed Minister of Natural Resources; Li Ganjie appointed Minister of Ecology and Environment; Wang Menghui appointed Minister of Housing and Urban-Rural Development; Li Xiaopeng appointed Minister of Transport; E Jingping appointed Minister of Water Resources; Han Changfu appointed Minister of Agriculture and Rural Affairs; Zhong Shan appointed Minister of Commerce; Luo Shugang appointed Minister of Culture and Tourism; Ma Xiaowei appointed Director of the National Health Commission; Sun Shaochong appointed Minister of Veterans Affairs; Wang Yupu appointed Minister of Emergency Management; Yi Gang appointed Governor of the People's Bank of China; Hu Zejun (female) appointed Auditor General of the National Audit Office. | 19 March 2018 | |
| 3 | Promulgated the Supervision Law of the People's Republic of China. | 20 March 2018 | |
| 4 | Promulgated the People's Assessors Law of the People's Republic of China. | 27 April 2018 | |
| 5 | Promulgated the Law of the People's Republic of China on the Protection of Heroes and Martyrs. | 27 April 2018 | |
| 6 | Promulgated the Decision on Amending Six Laws Including the Law of the People's Republic of China on Frontier Health and Quarantine. | 27 April 2018 | |
| 7 | Promulgated the E-commerce Law of the People's Republic of China. | 31 August 2018 | |
| 8 | Promulgated the Soil Pollution Prevention and Control Law of the People's Republic of China. | 31 August 2018 | |
| 9 | Promulgated the Decision on Amending the Individual Income Tax Law of the People's Republic of China. | 31 August 2018 | |
| 10 | Promulgated the Decision on Amending the Criminal Procedure Law of the People's Republic of China. | 26 October 2018 | |
| 11 | Promulgated the Organic Law of the People's Courts of the People's Republic of China. | 26 October 2018 | |
| 12 | Promulgated the Organic Law of the People's Procuratorates of the People's Republic of China. | 26 October 2018 | |
| 13 | Promulgated the Law of the People's Republic of China on International Criminal Judicial Assistance. | 26 October 2018 | |
| 14 | Promulgated the Regulations on Fire and Rescue Ranks of the People's Republic of China. | 26 October 2018 | |
| 15 | Promulgated the Decision on Amending the Company Law of the People's Republic of China. | 26 October 2018 | |
| 16 | Promulgated the decision to amend fifteen laws, including the Wildlife Protection Law of the People's Republic of China. | 26 October 2018 | |
| 17 | Promulgated the Decision on Amending the Rural Land Contracting Law of the People's Republic of China. | 29 December 2018 | |
| 18 | Promulgated the Law of the People's Republic of China on the Tax on Occupation of Cultivated Land. | 29 December 2018 | |
| 19 | Promulgated the Vehicle Purchase Tax Law of the People's Republic of China. | 29 December 2018 | |
| 20 | Promulgated the Civil Servant Law of the People's Republic of China. | 29 December 2018 | |
| 21 | Promulgated the decision to amend the Organic Law of the Villagers' Committees of the People's Republic of China and the Organic Law of the Urban Residents' Committees of the People's Republic of China. | 29 December 2018 | |
| 22 | Promulgated the decision to amend five laws, including the Product Quality Law of the People's Republic of China. | 29 December 2018 | |
| 23 | Promulgated the decision to amend four laws, including the Electricity Law of the People's Republic of China. | 29 December 2018 | |
| 24 | Promulgated the decision to amend seven laws, including the Labor Law of the People's Republic of China. | 29 December 2018 | |
| 25 | Promulgated the Decision on Amending the Social Insurance Law of the People's Republic of China. | 29 December 2018 | |
| 26 | Promulgated the Foreign Investment Law of the People's Republic of China. | 15 March 2019 | |
| 27 | Promulgated the Judges Law of the People's Republic of China. | 23 April 2019 | |
| 28 | Promulgated the Law of the People's Republic of China on Prosecutors. | 23 April 2019 | |
| 29 | Promulgated the decision to amend eight laws, including the Construction Law of the People's Republic of China. | 23 April 2019 | |
| 30 | Promulgated the Vaccine Administration Law of the People's Republic of China. | 29 June 2019 | |
| 31 | Promulgated the Drug Administration Law of the People's Republic of China. | 26 August 2019 | |
| 32 | Promulgated the decision to amend the Land Administration Law of the People's Republic of China and the Urban Real Estate Administration Law of the People's Republic of China. | 26 August 2019 | |
| 33 | Promulgated the Resource Tax Law of the People's Republic of China. | 26 August 2019 | |
| 34 | The Medal of the Republic was awarded to Yu Min, Shen Jilan (female), Sun Jiadong, Li Yannian, Zhang Fuqing, Yuan Longping, Huang Xuhua, and Tu Youyou (female); the Order of Friendship was awarded to Raúl Castro Ruz (Cuba), Maha Chakri Sirindhorn (female, Thailand), Salim Ahmed Salim (Tanzania), Galina Veniaminovna Kulikova (female, Russia), Jean-Pierre Raffarin (France), and Isabelle Crook (female, Canada); the National Honorary Title of People's Scientist was awarded to Ye Peijian, Wu Wenjun, Nan Rendong (Manchu), Gu Fangzhou, and Cheng Kaijia; the National Honorary Title of People's Educator was awarded to Yu Yi (female), Wei Xinghua, and Gao Mingxuan; and the National Honorary Title of People's Educator was awarded to Wang Meng, Qin Yi (female), and Guo... Lan Ying (female) was awarded the national honorary title of " People's Artist "; Aireti Mamuti (Uyghur), Shen Liangliang, Mai Xiande, and Zhang Chao were awarded the national honorary title of "People's Hero"; Wang Wenjiao, Wang Youde (Hui), Wang Qimin, Wang Jicai, Burumahan Maulduo (female, Kyrgyz), Zhu Yanfu, Li Baoguo, Du Guima (female, Mongolian), and Gao Derong (Dulong) were awarded the national honorary title of "People's Role Model"; Re Di (Tibetan) was awarded the national honorary title of "Outstanding Contributor to National Unity"; Tung Chee-hwa was awarded the national honorary title of "Outstanding Contributor to 'One Country, Two Systems "; Li Daoyu was awarded the national honorary title of "Outstanding Contributor to Diplomatic Work"; and Fan Jinshi (female) was awarded the national honorary title of " Outstanding Contributor to Cultural Relics Protection | 17 September 2019 | |
| 35 | Promulgated the Cryptography Law of the People's Republic of China. | 26 October 2019 | |
| 36 | Huang Shuxian was removed from his post as Minister of Civil Affairs; Li Jiheng was appointed as Minister of Civil Affairs. | 26 October 2019 | |
| 37 | Promulgated the revised version of the Securities Law of the People's Republic of China. | 28 December 2019 | |
| 38 | Promulgated the Basic Medical and Health Care and Health Promotion Law of the People's Republic of China. | 28 December 2019 | |
| 39 | Promulgated the Forest Law of the People's Republic of China. | 28 December 2019 | |
| 40 | Promulgated the Community Correction Law of the People's Republic of China. | 28 December 2019 | |
| 41 | Promulgated the decision to amend the Law of the People's Republic of China on the Protection of Investments by Taiwan Compatriots. | 28 December 2019 | |
| 42 | Promulgated the Decision on Abolishing Relevant Legal Provisions and Systems Concerning Custody and Education. | 28 December 2019 | |
| 43 | Promulgated the Law of the People's Republic of China on the Prevention and Control of Environmental Pollution by Solid Waste. | 29 April 2020 | |
| 44 | Fu Zhenghua was removed from his post as Minister of Justice; Tang Yijun was appointed Minister of Justice; Li Ganjie was removed from his post as Minister of Ecology and Environment; Huang Runqiu was appointed Minister of Ecology and Environment. | 29 April 2020 | |
| 45 | Promulgated the Civil Code of the People's Republic of China. | 28 May 2020 | |
| 46 | Promulgated the Law of the People's Republic of China on Governmental Sanctions for Public Employees. | 20 June 2020 | |
| 47 | Promulgated the revised version of the Archives Law of the People's Republic of China. | 20 June 2020 | |
| 48 | Promulgated the People's Armed Police Law of the People's Republic of China. | 20 June 2020 | |
| 49 | Promulgated the Law of the People's Republic of China on Safeguarding National Security in the Hong Kong Special Administrative Region. | 30 June 2020 | |
| 50 | Hu Zejun (female) is removed from the post of Auditor General of the National Audit Office; Hou Kai is appointed as Auditor General of the National Audit Office. | 30 June 2020 | |
| 51 | Promulgated the Urban Maintenance and Construction Tax Law of the People's Republic of China. | 11 August 2020 | |
| 52 | Promulgated the People's Republic of China Deed Tax Law. | 11 August 2020 | |
| 53 | Awarded Zhong Nanshan the Medal of the Republic; awarded Zhang Boli, Zhang Dingyu, and Chen We the national honorary title of "People's Hero". | 11 August 2020 | |
| 54 | Miao Wei was removed from his post as Minister of Industry and Information Technology; Xiao Yaqing was appointed Minister of Industry and Information Technology; Luo Shugang was removed from his post as Minister of Culture and Tourism; Hu Heping was appointed Minister of Culture and Tourism. | 11 August 2020 | |
| 55 | Promulgated the Decision on Amending the Patent Law of the People's Republic of China. | 17 October 2020 | |
| 56 | Promulgated the Biosafety Law of the People's Republic of China. | 17 October 2020 | |
| 57 | Promulgated the Law of the People's Republic of China on the Protection of Minors. | 17 October 2020 | |
| 58 | Promulgated the Export Control Law of the People's Republic of China. | 17 October 2020 | |
| 59 | Promulgated the Decision on Amending the Law of the People's Republic of China on the National Flag. | 17 October 2020 | |
| 60 | Promulgated the Decision on Amending the Law of the People's Republic of China on the National Emblem. | 17 October 2020 | |
| 61 | Promulgated the Decision on Amending the Electoral Law of the National People's Congress and Local People's Congresses of the People's Republic of China. | 17 October 2020 | |
| 62 | Promulgated the Decision on Amending the Copyright Law of the People's Republic of China. | 11 November 2020 | |
| 63 | Promulgated the Law of the People's Republic of China on the Protection of Veterans. | 11 November 2020 | |
| 64 | Promulgated the Law of the People's Republic of China on the Prevention of Juvenile Delinquency. | 26 December 2020 | |
| 65 | Promulgated the Yangtze River Protection Law of the People's Republic of China. | 26 December 2020 | |
| 66 | Promulgated the Amendment (XI) to the Criminal Law of the People's Republic of China. | 26 December 2020 | |
| 67 | Promulgated the National Defense Law of the People's Republic of China. | 26 December 2020 | |
| 68 | Batel (Mongolian) is removed from his post as Director of the State Ethnic Affairs Commission; Chen Xiaojiang is appointed as Director of the State Ethnic Affairs Commission. Han Changfu is removed from his post as Minister of Agriculture and Rural Affairs; Tang Renjian is appointed as Minister of Agriculture and Rural Affairs. Zhong Shan is removed from his post as Minister of Commerce; Wang Wentao is appointed as Minister of Commerce. | 26 December 2020 | |
| 69 | Promulgated the revised version of the Animal Epidemic Prevention Law of the People's Republic of China. | 22 January 2021 | |
| 70 | Promulgated the revised version of the Administrative Penalty Law of the People's Republic of Chin. | 22 January 2021 | |
| 71 | Promulgated the Coast Guard Law of the People's Republic of China. | 22 January 2021 | |
| 72 | E Jingping was removed from his post as Minister of Water Resources; Li Guoying was appointed as Minister of Water Resources. | 28 February 2021 | |
| 73 | Promulgated the Decision on Amending the Organic Law of the National People's Congress of the People's Republic of China. | 11 March 2021 | |
| 74 | Promulgated the Decision on Amending the Rules of Procedure of the National People's Congress of the People's Republic of China. | 11 March 2021 | |
| 75 | Promulgated the Methods for Selecting the Chief Executive of the Hong Kong Special Administrative Region (Annex I to the Basic Law of the Hong Kong Special Administrative Region of the People's Republic of China). | 30 March 2021 | |
| 76 | Promulgated the revised version of Annex II to the Basic Law of the Hong Kong Special Administrative Region of the People's Republic of China, concerning the method for the formation and voting procedures of the Legislative Council of the Hong Kong Special Administrative Region. | 30 March 2021 | |
| 77 | Promulgated the Rural Revitalization Promotion Law of the People's Republic of China. | 29 April 2021 | |
| 78 | Promulgated the Anti-Food Waste Law of the People's Republic of China. | 29 April 2021 | |
| 79 | Promulgated the Maritime Traffic Safety Law of the People's Republic of China. | 29 April 2021 | |
| 80 | Promulgated the Decision on Amending the Education Law of the People's Republic of China. | 29 April 2021 | |
| 81 | Promulgated the decision to amend eight laws, including the Road Traffic Safety Law of the People's Republic of China. | 29 April 2021 | |
| 82 | Promulgated the Decision on Amending the Measures for the Election of Deputies to the National People's Congress and Local People's Congresses at the County Level and Above by the Chinese People's Liberation Army. | 29 April 2021 | |
| 83 | Huang Ming has been appointed Minister of Emergency Management. | 29 April 2021 | |
| 84 | Promulgated the Data Security Law of the People's Republic of China. | 10 June 2021 | |
| 85 | Promulgated the Law of the People's Republic of China on the Hainan Free Trade Port. | 10 June 2021 | |
| 86 | Promulgated the Law of the People's Republic of China on the Protection of the Status and Rights of Military Personnel. | 10 June 2021 | |
| 87 | Promulgated the Law of the People's Republic of China on the Protection of Military Facilities. | 10 June 2021 | |
| 88 | Promulgated the Decision on Amending the Law of the People's Republic of China on Work Safety. | 10 June 2021 | |
| 89 | Promulgated the Stamp Tax Law of the People's Republic of China. | 10 June 2021 | |
| 90 | Promulgated the Anti-Foreign Sanctions Law of the People's Republic of China. | 10 June 2021 | |
| 91 | Promulgated the Personal Information Protection Law of the People's Republic of China. | 20 August 2021 | |
| 92 | Promulgated the Law of the People's Republic of China on Supervisory Officials. | 20 August 2021 | |
| 93 | Promulgated the Legal Aid Law of the People's Republic of China. | 20 August 2021 | |
| 94 | Promulgated the Physician Law of the People's Republic of Chin. | 20 August 2021 | |
| 95 | Promulgated the Military Service Law of the People's Republic of China. | 20 August 2021 | |
| 96 | Promulgated the Decision on Amending the Population and Family Planning Law of the People's Republic of China. | 20 August 2021 | |
| 97 | Chen Baosheng was removed from his post as Minister of Education; Huai Jinpeng was appointed as Minister of Education. | 20 August 2021 | |
| 98 | Promulgated the Law of the People's Republic of China on the Promotion of Family Education. | 23 October 2021 | |
| 99 | Promulgated the Law of the People's Republic of China on Land Borders. | 23 October 2021 | |
| 100 | Promulgated the Decision on Amending the Audit Law of the People's Republic of China. | 23 October 2021 | |
| 101 | Promulgated the Anti-organized Crime Law of the People's Republic of China | 24 December 2021 | |
| 102 | Promulgated the Wetland Protection Law of the People's Republic of China. | 24 December 2021 | |
| 103 | Promulgated the Law of the People's Republic of China on Scientific and Technological Progress. | 24 December 2021 | |
| 104 | Promulgated the Noise Pollution Prevention and Control Law of the People's Republic of China. | 24 December 2021 | |
| 105 | Promulgated the Decision on Amending the Seed Law of the People's Republic of China. | 24 December 2021 | |
| 106 | Promulgated the Decision on Amending the Civil Procedure Law of the People's Republic of China. | 24 December 2021 | |
| 107 | Promulgated the Decision on Amending the Trade Union Law of the People's Republic of China. | 24 December 2021 | |
| 108 | Promulgated the Decision on the Rank System for Active-Duty Soldiers of the Chinese People's Liberation Army. | 28 February 2022 | |
| 109 | Li Jiheng was removed from his post as Minister of Civil Affairs; Tang Dengjie was appointed as Minister of Civil Affairs. | 28 February 2022 | |
| 110 | Promulgated the Decision on Amending the Law of the People's Republic of China on the Organization of Local People's Congresses and Local People's Governments at All Levels. | 11 March 2022 | |
| 111 | Promulgated the Futures and Derivatives Law of the People's Republic of China. | 20 April 2022 | |
| 112 | Promulgated the Vocational Education Law of the People's Republic of China. | 20 April 2022 | |
| 113 | Removed as the Minister of Housing and Urban-Rural Development. | 20 April 2022 | |
| 114 | Promulgated the Sports Law of the People's Republic of China. | 24 June 2022 | |
| 115 | Promulgated the Law of the People's Republic of China on the Protection of Black Soil. | 24 June 2022 | |
| 116 | Promulgated the Decision on Amending the Anti-Monopoly Law of the People's Republic of China. | 24 June 2022 | |
| 117 | Promulgated the Decision on Amending the Rules of Procedure of the Standing Committee of the National People's Congress of the People's Republic of China. | 24 June 2022 | |
| 118 | Chen Xiaojiang is removed from his post as Director of the State Ethnic Affairs Commission; Pan Yue is appointed as Director of the State Ethnic Affairs Commission. Zhao Kezhi is removed from his concurrent post as Minister of Public Security; Wang Xiaohong is appointed as Minister of Public Security. Zhang Jinan is removed from his post as Minister of Human Resources and Social Security; Zhou Zuyi is appointed as Minister of Human Resources and Social Security. Lu Hao is removed from his post as Minister of Natural Resources; Wang Guanghua is appointed as Minister of Natural Resources. Ni Hong is appointed as Minister of Housing and Urban-Rural Development. Sun Shaochong is removed from his post as Minister of Veterans Affairs; Pei Jinjia is appointed as Minister of Veterans Affairs. | 24 June 2022 | |
| 119 | Promulgated the Anti-Telecommunications and Internet Fraud Law of the People's Republic of China. | 2 September 2022 | |
| 120 | Promulgated the Law of the People's Republic of China on the Quality and Safety of Agricultural Products. | 2 September 2022 | |
| 121 | Xiao Yaqing was removed from his post as Minister of Industry and Information Technology; Jin Zhuanglong was appointed Minister of Industry and Information Technology; Huang Ming was removed from his post as Minister of Emergency Management; Wang Xiangxi was appointed Minister of Emergency Management. | 2 September 2022 | |
| 122 | Promulgated the Law of the People's Republic of China on the Protection of Women's Rights and Interests. | 30 October 2022 | |
| 123 | Promulgated the Yellow River Protection Law of the People's Republic of China. | 30 October 2022 | |
| 124 | Promulgated the Animal Husbandry Law of the People's Republic of China. | 30 October 2022 | |
| 125 | Removed Chen Wenqing and appointed Chen Yixin as the Minister of State Security. | 30 October 2022 | |
| 126 | Promulgated the Wildlife Protection Law of the People's Republic of China. | 30 December 2022 | |
| 127 | Promulgated the Law of the People's Republic of China on Reserve Personnel. | 30 December 2022 | |
| 128 | Promulgated the Decision on Amending the Foreign Trade Law of the People's Republic of China. | 30 December 2022 | |
| 129 | Wang Yi was relieved of his concurrent post as Minister of Foreign Affairs; Qin Gang was appointed Minister of Foreign Affairs. Zhou Zuyi was relieved of his post as Minister of Human Resources and Social Security; Wang Xiaoping was appointed Minister of Human Resources and Social Security. | 30 December 2022 | |
| 130 | Removed Tang Yijun and appointed He Rong as the Minister of Justice. | 24 February 2023 | |
