= China International Search and Rescue Team =

Earthquake response team

The China International Search and Rescue Team (CISAR; 中国国际救援队) is an active Chinese professional heavy search and rescue team responsible for search and rescue during earthquakes and other natural disasters. Established in 2001, it is directly affiliated to the State Council of China. It is one of the two international professional rescue teams of China, alongside the China Search and Rescue Team (CSAR; 中国救援队) established by the Ministry of Emergency Management of China in August 2018. The two teams maintain separate, active INSARAG Heavy USAR certifications from the United Nations.

The CISAR is directly run by the State Council of China, and comprises experts and personnel from the China Earthquake Administration, the National Earthquake Response Support Service Center, the 82nd Engineering Brigade of the 82nd Group Army, and the People's Liberation Army General Hospital. The team is the first Chinese professional earthquake search and rescue team, and it had 480 members as of 2020.

== History ==
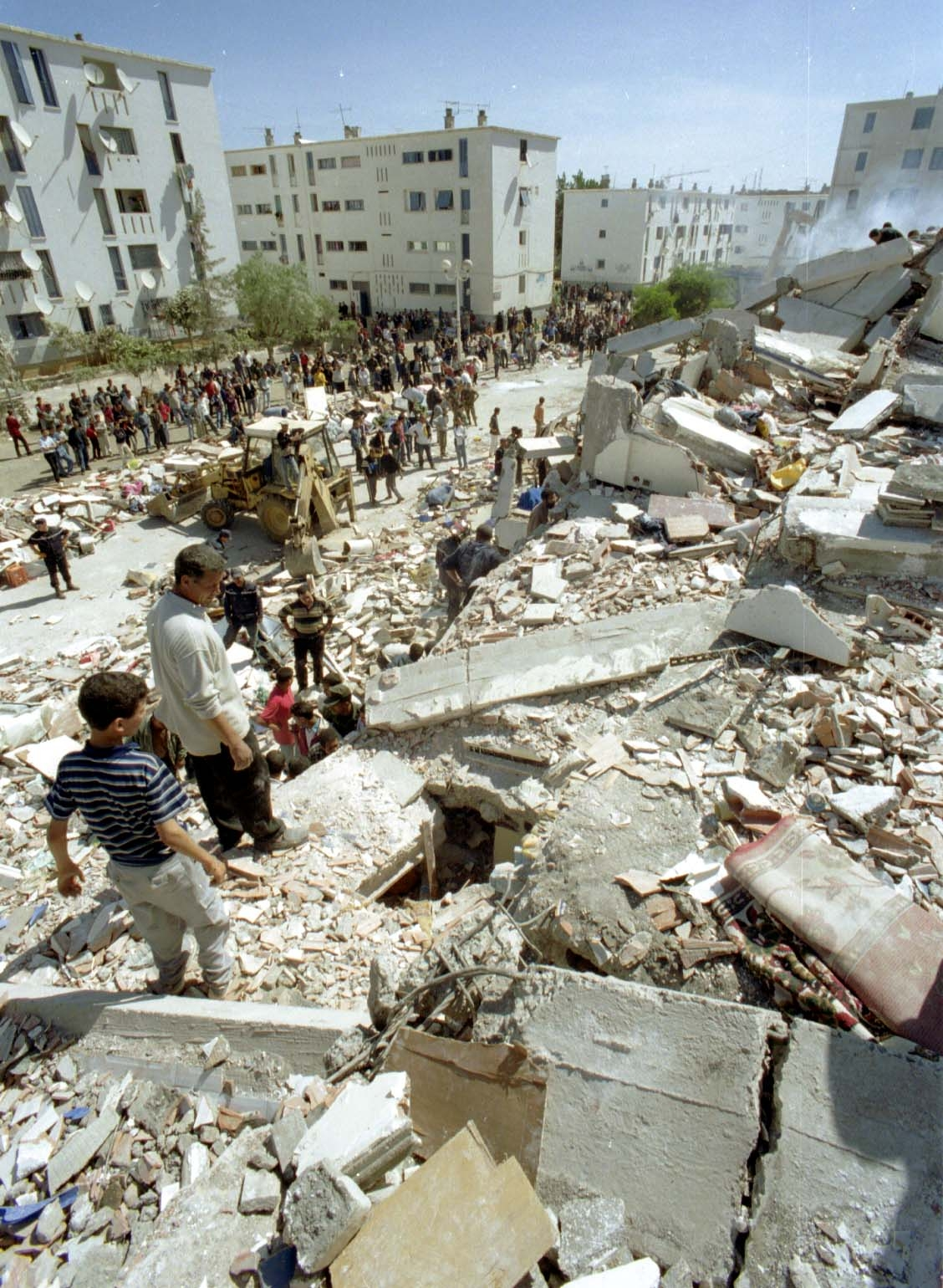
2003 Boumerdès earthquake. The CISAR was dispatched for search and rescue abroad for the first time.

In 2000, then Vice Premier of the PRC State Council Wen Jiabao proposed the idea for the rescue team.

In December 2000, upon the approval of the PRC State Council and the PRC Central Military Commission, the General Office of the State Council issued the CISAR Construction Scheme and set in motion the creation of the CISAR. Members of the team would be drawn from the China Earthquake Administration, engineer corps of the 38nd Group Army and the People's Liberation Army General Hospital.

The CISAR team was activated for the first time in 2003 after several years of planning. Initially, the team had roughly 222 members. On 24 February, the team was assigned by the Chinese Central Government to Maralbexi County for search and rescue after an earthquake in Payzawat County, Xinjiang Province. On 22 May, the day after the 2003 MW 6.8 Boumerdès earthquake, the CISAR flew to the epicentre in Boumerdès Province and rescued one person, marking the first time the team worked outside China's borders.

On 28 August 2004, the National Earthquake Response Support Service Center was established. It was responsible for onsite search and rescue, material management and onsite monitoring following earthquakes and worked in a support role to CISAR.

In November 2009, the CISAR passed the Insarag External Classification (IEC) for UN search and rescue organisations and was authenticated as an international heavy search and rescue team. It became the second UN heavy search and rescue team in Asia and the first in China. In 2010, the team expanded its ranks from 220 members to about 480.

The Ministry of Emergency Management established the separate China Search and Rescue team in 2018.

== Search and rescue ability ==
The CISAR is typically able to arrive at earthquake sites within 48 hours and rapidly gather supplies and carry out rescue operations. Other tasks carried out by the team included setting up reception centres and carrying out heavy search and rescue operations. The team was tasked with assisting people in disaster areas, offering first aid, preventive healthcare, and offering reconstruction services.

The CISAR participated in more than 20 earthquake and disaster sites around the world, carrying out search and rescue tasks. The team was credited with saving 67 people and clearing 3,000 bodies at various locations. The team also helped find and treat thousands of earthquake victims.

Some of the disasters to which the team responded were:

- 2003 Bam Earthquake
- 2004 Indian Ocean Earthquake
- 2005 Kashmir Earthquake
- Wenchuan Earthquake
- 2010 Yushu Earthquake
- 2010 Pakistan Floods
- 2010 Haiti Earthquake
- 2011 Christchurch Earthquake
- 2011 Northeast Japan Pacific Offshore Earthquake
- 2014 Ludian Earthquake
- Nepal Earthquake
- 2017 Jiuzhaigou Earthquake

The CISAR has access to a variety of equipment, including optical sound wave detectors, infrared detectors, hydraulic pliers, moon lamps, airbags, search and rescue dogs, maritime satellite phones, and more.

The team is equipped with three RW3 large rescue vehicles, three trailer-type container rescue vehicles, several satellite cluster communication vehicles and command vehicles. The large rescue vehicle is loaded with 280 sets of equipment, including sonic life search instrument, hydraulic power station, gas cylinder respirator, vehicle-mounted generator, etc. Each vehicle could support a detachment of 60 to 70 people.

The CISAR medical detachment is equipped with a variety of advanced medical equipment and devices. The CISAR mobile hospital was able to carry out medical aid in six field emergency units, including the command unit, classified disposal unit, critical illness emergency unit, surgical treatment unit, inspection and test unit, and pharmaceutical equipment unit. According to the experience of the CISAR in earthquake relief, about 80% of disaster victims suffer psychological trauma after strong earthquakes, and the CISAR provided care for those suffering such trauma.

== Staffing ==
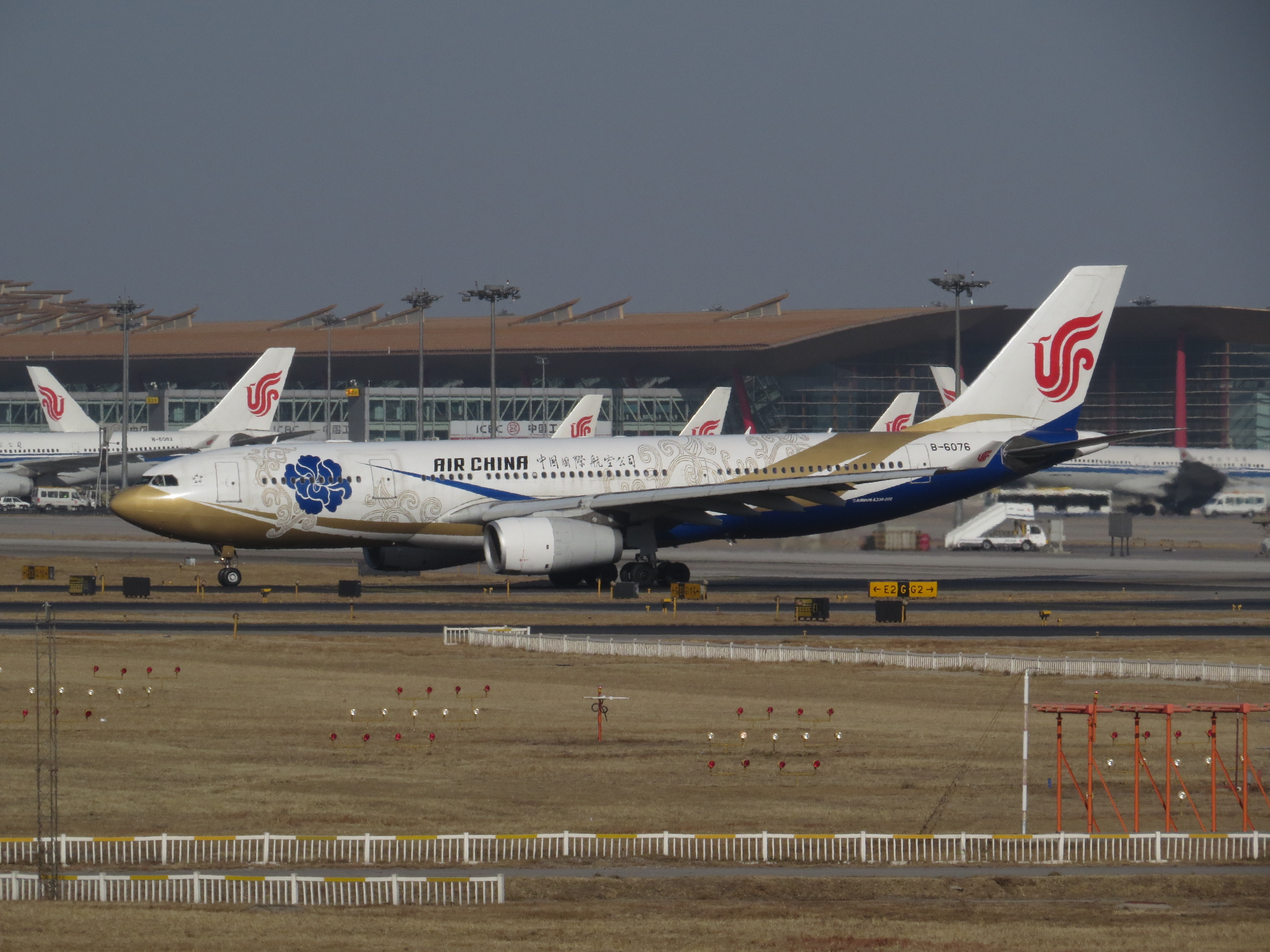
CISAR often used China International Airlines charter flights to perform rescue missions overseas, such as the pictured plane used by CISAR during the 2010 Haiti Earthquake.

The team consists of experts from the China Earthquake Administration who are responsible for earthquakes, engineering structures, and dangerous goods, liaisons familiar with the UN's rescue affairs, emergency medical personnel from the General Hospital of Chinese People's Armed Police Forces, and professional rescuers from engineer corps of the People's Liberation Army.

The CISAR is under the leadership of the State Council and the Central Military Commission, with the Joint Meeting of Onsite Working Team Leaders for Earthquake Disasters as the coordinating and managerial body.

In order to conduct professional skill training for rescue team members, the Search and Rescue Centre established a National Earthquake Emergency Rescue Training Base in Fenghuangling, Haidian District, Beijing. The training base covered an area of 194 acres, and the training ground covered an area of 6,700 square meters.

The medical personnel of CISAR is dispatched by the Third Medical Center of the People's Liberation Army General Hospital, including doctors from departments such as emergency, internal medicine, surgery, obstetrics and gynaecology, ophthalmology, otolaryngology, dermatology, laboratory and anaesthesiology, responsible for providing medical services for victims in the earthquake-stricken area, and providing medical protection for rescue team members. In 2005, the CISAR Mobile Hospital was established; it can provide medical personnel with two months of full-time emergency rescue training and exercises every year.
