= Anti-Foreign Sanctions Law =

Law of the People's Republic of China

Law of the People’s Republic of China on Countering Foreign Sanctions

Standing Committee of the National People's Congress
- Passed by: Standing Committee of the National People's Congress
- Passed: 10 June 2021
- Signed by: President Xi Jinping
- Signed: 30 June 2021
- Commenced: 10 June 2021
- Effective: 10 June 2021

Legislative history
- Introduced by: Council of Chairpersons
- First reading: April 2021
- Second reading: June 2021
- Status: In force

Anti-Foreign Sanctions Law (AFSL) is a law of the People's Republic of China. Developed in response to increasing international sanctions targeting PRC officials and entities and passed by the Standing Committee of the National People's Congress on June 10, 2021, on an accelerated basis without public consultation, it establishes a comprehensive legal framework enabling the Chinese government to implement countermeasures against foreign sanctions.

== Background ==
AFSL emerged during a period of heightened tensions between China and Western nations, particularly following sanctions imposed by the United States, European Union, United Kingdom, and Canada over concerns regarding human rights violations in Xinjiang and Hong Kong. Its development followed Xi Jinping's November 2020 call for legal methods to defend PRC "national sovereignty, security, and development interests."

AFSL is part of a broader framework of PRC measures designed to counter foreign restrictions, including the Unreliable Entity List mechanism, Ministry of Commerce blocking statutes, efforts to promote RMB settlement in international trade, and development of alternative international payment systems.

== Scope ==
AFSL targets individuals and organizations involved in creating or implementing sanctions against PRC interests, participating in the drafting or decision-making process of such sanctions, or supporting with their implementation. It authorizes denial or cancellation of visas, asset freezes, restrictions on business activities in China, prohibition of transactions with Chinese entities, or other unspecified countermeasures deemed appropriate by authorities.

In March 2025, following tariffs imposed by Trump, Li Qiang signed an order implementing new rules to strengthen countermeasures under AFSL. In 2025 and 2026, China further expanded its counter-extraterritorial regulatory framework through new industrial supply chain and compliance rules that created direct conflicts for multinational companies navigating foreign sanctions, export controls, and supply chain due diligence obligations.

== Notable cases ==
In December 2024, in response to recent U.S. arms sales to Taiwan, Beijing intended to sanction an executive at Data Link Solutions LLC, a military contracting joint venture, but mistakenly targeted Beth Edler of Data Link Solutions Inc., president of an unrelated Missouri-based company providing data services to telephone directory publishers.

== Reception ==
Legal scholars, the international business community, and foreign governments have expressed concerns about AFSL's broad scope and extraterritorial application, lack of appeal mechanisms for sanctioned entities, and impact on global supply chains.

== See also ==
- Chinese government sanctions
- Export Control Law of the People's Republic of China
- Foreign Relations Law of the People's Republic of China
- United States sanctions against China
