= Zhang Chengzhong =

Chinese politician

- 张成中

Minister of Emergency Management
- Incumbent
- Assumed office 30 April 2026
- Premier: Li Qiang
- Preceded by: Wang Xiangxi

Personal details
- Born: October 1970 (age 55) Gaizhou, Liaoning, China
- Party: Chinese Communist Party (since 1998)

Chinese name
- Traditional Chinese: 張成中
- Simplified Chinese: 张成中
Transcriptions
Standard Mandarin
- Hanyu Pinyin: Zhāng Chéngzhōng

Zhang Chengzhong (Chinese: 张成中; born October 1970) is a Chinese politician who is currently serving as the Minister of Emergency Management. Previously, he served as executive vice governor of Hebei and Communist party secretary of Tangshan.

== Biography ==
Zhang Chengzhong was born in Gaizhou, Liaoning, in October 1970. He began his career in China's state-owned enterprises in the petroleum and petrochemical sector, where he held various technical and managerial roles. He later transitioned into public service and worked in multiple local government roles in Liaoning, eventually serving as the Communist party secretary of Panjin.

Zhang subsequently rose to provincial leadership, serving as secretary-general of the CCP Liaoning Provincial Committee, where he was the main aide to party secretaries Zhang Guoqing and Hao Peng. In July 2023, he was rotated to the CCP Hebei Provincial Committee, serving as executive vice governor of the province and then party secretary of Tangshan.

In March 2026, he was appointed Communist party secretary of the Ministry of Emergency Management, succeeding Wang Xiangxi, who had fallen from grace at the beginning of 2026. On April 30, he was appointed Minister of Emergency Management.

Government offices
Preceded by Wang Xiangxi	Minister of Emergency Management; 2026–present	Incumbent
