= Preschool Education Law of the People's Republic of China =

Law of China

Standing Committee of the National People's Congress
- Passed by: Standing Committee of the National People's Congress
- Passed: 8 November 2024
- Signed by: President Xi Jinping
- Signed: 8 November 2024
- Commenced: 1 June 2025

Legislative history
- Introduced by: State Council of China
- First reading: 28 August–1 September 2023
- Second reading: 25–28 June 2024
- Third reading: 4–8 November 2024
- Status: In force

Preschool Education Law of the People's Republic of China
- Simplified Chinese: 中华人民共和国学前教育法
- Traditional Chinese: 中華人民共和國學前教育法
Transcriptions
Standard Mandarin
- Hanyu Pinyin: Zhōnghuá Rénmín Gònghéguó Xuéqián Jiàoyù Fǎ

The Preschool Education Law of the People's Republic of China was passed by the Standing Committee of the National People's Congress on 8 November 2024 and came into effect on 1 June 2025. It concerns preschool education in China.

== Legislative history ==
The Preschool Education Law was passed by the Standing Committee of the National People's Congress (NPCSC) on 8 November 2024, and was signed by Xi Jinping in his capacity as president in the same day. It came into effect on 1 June 2025.

== Provisions ==
The law requires the government to plan, fund, and ensure equitable access to preschool education. It mandates that preschool education follow the leadership of the Chinese Communist Party and "adhere to a socialist orientation".

The law sets strict requirements for preschool educators. Namely, preschool institutions hiring teachers, principals, and health care staff must check eligible candidates' backgrounds with the local education and public security authorities. Those with a history of abuse, sexual assault, harassment, trafficking, drug use, or other criminal offenses are deemed not eligible. Those who engage in "corporal punishment, discrimination, abuse, or sexual misconduct with children" face dismissal or permanent ban from the preeducation sector, while their institutions face losing their educational licenses. Employers are additionally required to check the health of the staff annually.

The law states that kindergarten children should be taught "China’s excellent traditional culture, revolutionary culture, and advanced socialist culture" and "the common consciousness of the Chinese nation".
