= List of presidential orders during the 10th National People's Congress =

The first session of the 10th National People's Congress (NPC) was held in Beijing from 5 to 18 March 2003. Hu Jintao was elected as the new President of China, replacing Jiang Zemin. During the 10th NPC, Hu issued 87 presidential decrees. The first, issued on 16 March 2003, appointed Wen Jiabao as Premier of the State Council. The last presidential decree issued during the 10th NPC was issued on 28 February 2008, promulgating the revised version of the Water Pollution Prevention and Control Law of the People's Republic of China. This list details the presidential decrees issued during the 10th NPC.

== List ==
List of Presidential Decrees of the People's Republic of China issued during the Tenth National People's Congress
Number	Content	Date signed	Ref.
1	Appointed Wen Jiabao as the Premier of the State Council.	16 March 2003	
2	The following appointments were made : Li Dezhu (of Korean ethnicity) as Director of the State Ethnic Affairs Commission ; Zhou Yongkang as Minister of Public Security (concurrently); Xu Yongyue as Minister of State Security ; Li Zhilun as Minister of Supervision ; Li Xueju as Minister of Civil Affairs ; Zhang Fusen as Minister of Justice ; Jin Renqing as Minister of Finance ; Zhang Bailin as Minister of Personnel ; Zheng Silin as Minister of Labor and Social Security ; Tian Fengshan as Minister of Land and Resources ; Wang Guangtao as Minister of Construction ; Liu Zhijun as Minister of Railways ; Zhang Chunxian as Minister of Transport ; Wang Xudong as Minister of Information Industry ; Wang Shucheng as Minister of Water Resources ; Du Qinglin as Minister of Agriculture ; Lü Fuyuan as Minister of Commerce ; Sun Jiazheng as Minister of Culture ; Zhang Wenkang as Minister of Health ; Zhang Weiqing as Director of the National Population and Family Planning Commission ; Zhou Xiaochuan as Governor of the People's Bank of China ; and Li Jinhua as Auditor General of the National Audit Office.	17 March 2003	
3	Zhang Wenkang was removed from his post as Minister of Health; Wu Yi (female) was appointed as Minister of Health (concurrently).	26 April 2003	
4	Promulgated the Law of the People's Republic of China on Resident Identity Cards.	28 June 2003	
5	Promulgated the Port Law of the People's Republic of China.	28 June 2003	
6	Promulgated the Law of the People's Republic of China on the Prevention and Control of Radioactive Pollution.	28 June 2003	
7	Promulgated the Administrative Licensing Law of the People's Republic of China.	27 August 2003	
8	Promulgated the Road Traffic Safety Law of the People's Republic of China.	28 October 2003	
9	Promulgated the Securities Investment Fund Law of the People's Republic of China.	28 October 2003	
10	Tian Fengshan was removed from his post as Minister of Land and Resources; Sun Wensheng was appointed as Minister of Land and Resources.	28 October 2003	
11	Promulgated the Banking Supervision and Administration Law of the People's Republic of China.	27 December 2003	
12	Promulgated the Decision on Amending the Law of the People's Republic of China on the People's Bank of China.	27 December 2003	
13	Promulgated the Decision on Amending the Commercial Banking Law of the People's Republic of China.	27 December 2003	
14	Lu Fuyuan was removed from his post as Minister of Commerce; Bo Xilai was appointed Minister of Commerce.	29 February 2004	
15	The revised version of the Foreign Trade Law of the People's Republic of China.	6 April 2004	
16	Promulgated the Law of the People's Republic of China on Promoting Agricultural Mechanization.	25 June 2004	
17	Promulgated the revised version of the Law of the People's Republic of China on the Prevention and Control of Infectious Diseases.	28 August 2004	
18	Promulgated the Electronic Signature Law of the People's Republic of China.	28 August 2004	
19	Promulgated the Decision on Amending the Highway Law of the People's Republic of China.	28 August 2004	
20	Promulgated the Decision on Amending the Company Law of the People's Republic of China.	28 August 2004	
21	Promulgated the Decision on Amending the Securities Law of the People's Republic of China.	28 August 2004	
22	Promulgated the Decision on Amending the Law of the People's Republic of China on Negotiable Instruments.	28 August 2004	
23	Promulgated the Decision on Amending the Auction Law of the People's Republic of China.	28 August 2004	
24	Promulgated the Decision on Amending the Wildlife Protection Law of the People's Republic of China.	28 August 2004	
25	Promulgated the Decision on Amending the Fisheries Law of the People's Republic of China.	28 August 2004	
26	Promulgated the Decision on Amending the Seed Law of the People's Republic of China.	28 August 2004	
27	Promulgated the Decision on Amending the Regulations of the People's Republic of China on Academic Degrees.	28 August 2004	
28	Promulgated the Decision on Amending the Land Administration Law of the People's Republic of China.	28 August 2004	
29	Promulgated the Decision on Amending the Electoral Law of the National People's Congress and Local People's Congresses of the People's Republic of China.	27 October 2004	
30	Promulgated the Decision on Amending the Law of the People's Republic of China on the Organization of Local People's Congresses and Local People's Governments at All Levels.	27 October 2004	
31	Promulgated the Law of the People's Republic of China on the Prevention and Control of Environmental Pollution by Solid Waste.	29 December 2004	
32	Promulgated the Fifth Amendment to the Criminal Law of the People's Republic of China.	28 February 2004	
33	Promulgated the Renewable Energy Law of the People's Republic of China.	28 February 2004	
34	Promulgated the Anti-Secession Law.	14 March 2005	
35	Promulgated the Civil Servant Law of the People's Republic of China.	27 April 2005	
36	Wu Yi (female) was relieved of her concurrent post as Minister of Health; Gao Qiang was appointed as Minister of Health.	27 April 2005	
37	Zhang Fusen is removed from the post of Minister of Justice; Wu Aiying (female) is appointed as Minister of Justice. Zheng Silin is removed from the post of Minister of Labor and Social Security; Tian Chengping is appointed as Minister of Labor and Social Security.	1 July 2005	
38	Promulgated the Law of the People's Republic of China on Penalties for Administration of Public Security.	28 August 2005	
39	Promulgated the Notarization Law of the People's Republic of China.	28 August 2005	
40	Promulgated the decision to amend the Law of the People's Republic of China on the Protection of Women's Rights and Interests.	28 August 2005	
41	Promulgated the Law of the People's Republic of China on Exemptions from Judicial Enforcement Measures Against the Property of Foreign Central Banks.	25 October 2005	
42	Promulgated the revised version of the Company Law of the People's Republic of China.	27 October 2005	
43	Promulgated the revised version of the Securities Law of the People's Republic of China.	27 October 2005	
44	Promulgated the Decision on Amending the Individual Income Tax Law of the People's Republic of China.	27 October 2005	
45	Promulgated the Animal Husbandry Law of the People's Republic of China.	29 December 2005	
46	Promulgated the Decision on Abolishing the Agricultural Tax Regulations of the People's Republic of China.	29 December 2005	
47	Zhang Chunxian was removed from his post as Minister of Transport; Li Shenglin was appointed as Minister of Transport.	29 December 2005	
48	Promulgated the Decision on Amending the Audit Law of the People's Republic of China.	28 February 2006	
49	Promulgated the Law of the People's Republic of China on the Quality and Safety of Agricultural Products.	29 April 2006	
50	Promulgated the Passport Law of the People's Republic of China.	29 April 2006	
51	Promulgated the Sixth Amendment to the Criminal Law of the People's Republic of China.	29 June 2006	
52	Promulgated the Compulsory Education Law of the People's Republic of China.	29 June 2006	
53	Promulgated the Supervision Law of the Standing Committees of the People's Congresses at All Levels of the People's Republic of China.	27 August 2006	
54	Promulgated the Enterprise Bankruptcy Law of the People's Republic of China.	27 August 2006	
55	Promulgated the revised version of the Partnership Enterprise Law of the People's Republic of China.	27 August 2006	
56	Promulgated the Anti-Money Laundering Law of the People's Republic of China.	31 October 2006	
57	Promulgated the Law of the People's Republic of China on Farmers' Specialized Cooperatives.	31 October 2006	
58	Promulgated the Decision on Amending the Banking Supervision and Administration Law of the People's Republic of China.	31 October 2006	
59	Promulgated the Decision on Amending the Organic Law of the People's Courts of the People's Republic of China.	31 October 2006	
60	Promulgated the Law of the People's Republic of China on the Protection of Minors.	29 December 2006	
61	Du Qinglin was removed from his post as Minister of Agriculture; Sun Zhengcai was appointed as Minister of Agriculture.	29 December 2006	
62	Promulgated the Property Law of the People's Republic of China.	16 March 2007	
63	Promulgated the Enterprise Income Tax Law of the People's Republic of China.	16 March 2007	
64	Li Zhaoxing is removed from the post of Minister of Foreign Affairs; Yang Jiechi is appointed Minister of Foreign Affairs. Xu Guanhua is removed from the post of Minister of Science and Technology ; Wan Gang is appointed Minister of Science and Technology. Sun Wensheng is removed from the post of Minister of Land and Resources; Xu Shaoshi is appointed Minister of Land and Resources. Wang Shucheng is removed from the post of Minister of Water Resources; Chen Lei is appointed Minister of Water Resources.	27 April 2007	
65	Promulgated the Labor Contract Law of the People's Republic of China.	29 June 2007	
66	Promulgated the Decision on Amending the Individual Income Tax Law of the People's Republic of China.	29 June 2007	
67	Gao Qiang was removed from his post as Minister of Health; Chen Zhu was appointed as Minister of Health.	29 June 2007	
68	Promulgated the Anti-Monopoly Law of the People's Republic of China.	30 August 2007	
69	Promulgated the Emergency Response Law of the People's Republic of China.	30 August 2007	
70	Promulgated the Employment Promotion Law of the People's Republic of China.	30 August 2007	
71	Promulgated the revised version of the Animal Epidemic Prevention Law of the People's Republic of China.	30 August 2007	
72	Promulgated a decision to amend the Urban Real Estate Management Law of the People's Republic of China.	30 August 2007	
73	Zhang Yunchuan is removed from his post as Director of the Commission of Science, Technology and Industry for National Defense ; Zhang Qingwei is appointed as Director of the Commission of Science, Technology and Industry for National Defense. Xu Yongyue is removed from his post as Minister of State Security; Geng Huichang is appointed as Minister of State Security. Ma Lan (female) is appointed as Minister of Supervision. Jin Renqing is removed from his post as is appointed as Minister of Finance. Zhang Bailin is removed from his post as Minister of Personnel ; Yin Weimin is appointed as Minister of Personnel.	30 August 2007	
74	Promulgated the Urban and Rural Planning Law of the People's Republic of China.	28 October 2007	
75	Promulgated the Decision on Amending the Civil Procedure Law of the People's Republic of China.	28 October 2007	
76	Promulgated the Law of the People's Republic of China on Lawyers.	28 October 2007	
77	Promulgated the Energy Conservation Law of the People's Republic of China.	28 October 2007	
78	Zhou Yongkang was removed from his concurrent post as Minister of Public Security; Meng Jianzhu was appointed Minister of Public Security.	28 October 2007	
79	Promulgated the Anti-Drug Law of the People's Republic of China.	29 December 2007	
80	Promulgated the Law of the People's Republic of China on Mediation and Arbitration of Labor Disputes.	29 December 2007	
81	Promulgated the decision to amend the Road Traffic Safety Law of the People's Republic of China.	29 December 2007	
82	Promulgated the Law of the People's Republic of China on Scientific and Technological Progress.	29 December 2007	
83	Promulgated the Decision on Amending the Law of the People's Republic of China on Frontier Health and Quarantine.	29 December 2007	
84	Promulgated the Decision on Amending the Law of the People's Republic of China on the Protection of Cultural Relics.	29 December 2007	
85	Promulgated the Decision on Amending the Individual Income Tax Law of the People's Republic of China.	29 December 2007	
86	Bo Xilai was removed from his post as Minister of Commerce; Chen Deming was appointed as Minister of Commerce.	29 December 2007	
87	Promulgated the Water Pollution Prevention and Control Law of the People's Republic of China.	28 February 2008	
