= List of presidential orders during the 11th National People's Congress =

The first session of the 11th National People's Congress (NPC) was held in Beijing from 5 to 18 March 2008, where Hu Jintao was re-elected as president. During the 11th NPC, Hu issued 75 presidential decrees. The first, issued on 16 March 2008, appointed Wen Jiabao as Premier of the State Council. The last presidential decree during the 11th NPC was issued on 28 December 2012, removing Meng Jianzhu from his concurrent post as Minister of Public Security and appointing Guo Shengkun as Minister of Public Security. This list details the presidential decrees issued during the 11th National People's Congress.

== List ==
List of Presidential Decrees of the People's Republic of China issued during the 11th National People's Congress
Number	Content	Date signed	Ref.
1	Appointed Wen Jiabao as the Premier of the State Council.	16 March 2008	
2	Li Keqiang. Hui Liangyu. Zhang Dejiang. and Wang Qishan were appointed Vice Premiers of the State Council ; Liu Yandong. Liang Guanglie. Ma Kai. Meng Jianzhu. and Dai Bingguo were appointed State Councilors ; Ma Kai was appointed Secretary- General of the State Council ; Yang Jiechi was appointed Minister of Foreign Affairs ; Liang Guanglie was appointed Minister of National Defense; Zhang Ping was appointed Director of the National Development and Reform Commission ; Zhou Ji was appointed Minister of Education ; Wan Gang was appointed Minister of Science and Technology ; Li Yizhong was appointed Minister of Industry and Information Technology ; Yang Jing was appointed Director of the State Ethnic Affairs Commission ; Meng Jianzhu was appointed Minister of Public Security ; Geng Huichang was appointed Minister of State Security ; Ma Yi was appointed Minister of Supervision ; Li Xueju was appointed Minister of Civil Affairs ; and Wu Ai was appointed... Ying was appointed Minister of Justice ; Xie Xuren was appointed Minister of Finance ; Yin Weimin was appointed Minister of Human Resources and Social Security ; Xu Shaoshi was appointed Minister of Land and Resources ; Zhou Shengxian was appointed Minister of Environmental Protection ; Jiang Weixin was appointed Minister of Housing and Urban-Rural Development ; Li Shenglin was appointed Minister of Transport; Liu Zhijun was appointed Minister of Railways ; Chen Lei was appointed Minister of Water Resources ; Sun Zhengcai was appointed Minister of Agriculture ; Chen Deming was appointed Minister of Commerce ; Cai Wu was appointed Minister of Culture ; Chen Zhu was appointed Minister of Health ; Li Bin was appointed Director of the National Population and Family Planning Commission ; Zhou Xiaochuan was appointed Governor of the People's Bank of China ; and Liu Jiayi was appointed Auditor General of the National Audit Office .	17 March 2008	
3	Promulgated the Law of the People's Republic of China on the Protection of Persons with Disabilities.	24 April 2008	
4	Promulgated the Law of the People's Republic of China on Promoting the Circular Economy.	29 August 2008	
5	Promulgated the Law of the People's Republic of China on State-Owned Assets of Enterprises.	28 October 2008	
6	Promulgated the Fire Protection Law of the People's Republic of China.	28 October 2008	
7	Promulgated the Law of the People's Republic of China on Earthquake Prevention and Disaster Reduction.	27 December 2008	
8	Promulgated the Decision on Amending the Patent Law of the People's Republic of China.	27 December 2008	
9	Promulgated the Food Safety Law of the People's Republic of China.	28 February 2009	
10	The Amendment (VII) to the Criminal Law of the People's Republic of China.	28 February 2009	
11	Promulgated the revised version of the Insurance Law of the People's Republic of China.	28 February 2009	
12	Promulgated the Postal Law of the People's Republic of China " was promulgated on April 24, 2009.	24 April 2009	
13	Promulgated the Decision on Amending the Rules of Procedure of the Standing Committee of the National People's Congress of the People's Republic of China.	24 April 2009	
14	Promulgated the Law of the People's Republic of China on Mediation and Arbitration of Rural Land Contractual Management Disputes.	27 June 2009	
15	Promulgated the revised version of the Statistics Law of the People's Republic of China.	27 June 2009	
16	Promulgated the Decision to Repeal Certain Laws.	27 June 2009	
17	Promulgated the People's Armed Police Law of the People's Republic of China.	27 August 2009	
18	Promulgated the Decision on Amending Certain Laws.	27 August 2009	
19	Promulgated the Law of the People's Republic of China on Diplomatic Personnel Stationed Abroad.	31 October 2009	
20	Zhou Ji was removed from his post as Minister of Education. and Yuan Guiren was appointed as Minister of Education.	31 October 2009	
21	Promulgated the Tort Liability Law of the People's Republic of China.	26 December 2009	
22	Promulgated the Law of the People's Republic of China on the Protection of Islands.	26 December 2009	
23	Promulgated the Decision on Amending the Renewable Energy Law of the People's Republic of China.	26 December 2009	
24	Sun Zhengcai was removed from his post as Minister of Agriculture. and Han Changfu was appointed as Minister of Agriculture.	26 December 2009	
25	Promulgated the National Defense Mobilization Law of the People's Republic of China.	26 February 2010	
26	Promulgated the Decision on Amending the Copyright Law of the People's Republic of China.	26 February 2010	
27	Promulgated the Decision on Amending the Electoral Law of the National People's Congress and Local People's Congresses of the People's Republic of China.	14 March 2010	
28	Promulgated the Law of the People's Republic of China on Guarding State Secrets.	29 April 2010	
29	Promulgated the Decision on Amending the Law of the People's Republic of China on State Compensation.	29 April 2010	
30	Promulgated the Law of the People's Republic of China on the Protection of Oil and Gas Pipelines.	25 June 2010	
31	Promulgated the Decision on Amending the Administrative Supervision Law of the People's Republic of China.	25 June 2010	
32	Li Xueju was removed from his post as Minister of Civil Affairs. and Li Liguo was appointed as Minister of Civil Affairs.	25 June 2010	
33	Promulgated the Decision on Amending the Law of the People's Republic of China on Reserve Officers.	28 August 2010	
34	Promulgated the People's Mediation Law of the People's Republic of China.	28 August 2010	
35	Promulgated the Social Insurance Law of the People's Republic of China.	28 October 2010	
36	Promulgated the Law of the People's Republic of China on the Application of Laws to Foreign-related Civil Relations.	28 October 2010	
37	Promulgated the Organic Law of the Villagers' Committees of the People's Republic of China.	28 October 2010	
38	Promulgated the Decision on Amending the Law of the People's Republic of China on Deputies to the National People's Congress and Local People's Congresses at Various Levels.	28 October 2010	
39	Promulgated the Water and Soil Conservation Law of the People's Republic of China.	25 December 2010	
40	Li Yizhong was removed from his post as Minister of Industry and Information Technology. and Miao Wei was appointed as Minister of Industry and Information Technology.	25 December 2010	
41	Promulgated the Eighth Amendment to the Criminal Law of the People's Republic of China.	25 February 2011	
42	Promulgated the Law of the People's Republic of China on Intangible Cultural Heritage.	25 February 2011	
43	Promulgated the Vehicle and Vessel Tax Law of the People's Republic of China.	25 February 2011	
44	Liu Zhijun was removed from his post as Minister of Railways. and Sheng Guangzu was appointed as Minister of Railways.	25 February 2011	
45	Promulgated the Decision on Amending the Coal Law of the People's Republic of China.	22 April 2011	
46	Promulgated the Decision on Amending the Construction Law of the People's Republic of China.	22 April 2011	
47	Promulgated the decision to amend the Road Traffic Safety Law of the People's Republic of China .	22 April 2011	
48	Promulgated the Decision on Amending the Individual Income Tax Law of the People's Republic of China.	30 June 2011	
49	Promulgated the Administrative Enforcement Law of the People's Republic of China.	30 June 2011	
50	Promulgated the Decision on Amending the Military Service Law of the People's Republic of China.	29 October 2011	
51	Promulgated the Decision on Amending the Law of the People's Republic of China on Resident Identity Cards.	29 October 2011	
52	Promulgated the Decision on Amending the Law of the People's Republic of China on the Prevention and Control of Occupational Diseases.	31 December 2011	
53	Li Bin was removed from his post as Director of the National Population and Family Planning Commission. and Wang Xia was appointed as Director of the National Population and Family Planning Commission.	31 December 2011	
54	Promulgated the Decision on Amending the Law of the People's Republic of China on Promoting Cleaner Production.	29 February 2012	
55	Promulgated the decision to amend the Criminal Procedure Law of the People's Republic of China.	14 March 2012	
56	Promulgated the Military Personnel Insurance Law of the People's Republic of China.	27 April 2012	
57	Promulgated the Exit and Entry Administration Law of the People's Republic of China.	30 June 2012	
58	Promulgated the Decision on Amending the Measures for the Election of Deputies to the National People's Congress and Local People's Congresses at the County Level and Above by the Chinese People's Liberation Army.	30 June 2012	
59	Promulgated the Decision on Amending the Civil Procedure Law of the People's Republic of China.	31 August 2012	
60	Promulgated the Decision on Amending the Agricultural Technology Extension Law of the People's Republic of China.	31 August 2012	
61	Li Shenglin was removed from his post as Minister of Transport ; Yang Chuantang was appointed as Minister of Transport.	31 August 2012	
62	Promulgated the Mental Health Law of the People's Republic of China.	26 October 2012	
63	Promulgated the Decision on Amending the Prison Law of the People's Republic of China.	26 October 2012	
64	Promulgated the decision to amend the Law of the People's Republic of China on Lawyers.	26 October 2012	
65	Promulgated the Decision on Amending the Law of the People's Republic of China on the Protection of Minors.	26 October 2012	
66	Promulgated the decision to amend the Law of the People's Republic of China on the Prevention of Juvenile Delinquency.	26 October 2012	
67	Promulgated the Decision on Amending the Law of the People's Republic of China on Penalties for Administration of Public Security.	26 October 2012	
68	Promulgated the Decision on Amending the Law of the People's Republic of China on State Compensation.	26 October 2012	
69	Promulgated the Decision on Amending the People's Police Law of the People's Republic of China.	26 October 2012	
70	Promulgated the Decision on Amending the Postal Law of the People's Republic of China.	26 October 2012	
71	Promulgated the Securities Investment Fund Law of the People's Republic of China .	28 December 2012	
72	Promulgated the Law of the People's Republic of China on the Protection of the Rights and Interests of the Elderly.	28 December 2012	
73	Promulgated the Decision on Amending the Labor Contract Law of the People's Republic of China.	28 December 2012	
74	Promulgated the Decision on Amending the Agricultural Law of the People's Republic of China.	28 December 2012	
75	Meng Jianzhu was relieved of his concurrent post as Minister of Public Security; Guo Shengkun was appointed Minister of Public Security.	28 December 2012	
