= Henan Polytechnic University =

Mining university in Jiaozuo, China

Henan Polytechnic University (HPU) is a mining university in the Henan province. Established by the British Syndicate Co. Ltd., in 1909, it has now developed into a multi-disciplinary coordinated development of teaching and research university covering science, technology, management, arts, law, economics, and education.

HPU is the A-level university of undergraduate teaching assessed by the National Ministry of Education. Both Chinese and international students can enroll at the university, with the qualifications of granting doctoral, master, and bachelor.

Educator Cai Yuanpei, geologist Weng Wen-hao, and industrialist Sun Yueqi served at the board of directors as executive director, honorary president, and chairman, respectively. Zhang Zhonglu, Zhang Qinglian, Ding Guanhai, Zhang Bosheng, and many other overseas scholars and professors taught at the university.

Since the 1980s, it has established sisterhood relationship with 15 countries and more than 30 universities and research institutions in the USA, UK, France, Canada, Australia, Poland, Russia, Japan, and Korea. Since its establishment, the university has cultivated more than 13 senior specialized personnel for the country.

== Research ==
Henan Polytechnic University is one of the top 10 institutions in the world in the publication of research on coal gangue utilisation.

== International students ==
The dormitories for international students at the main campus are located in Jiaozuo City. There are approximately 500 international students studying at HPU. Its international students come from a multitude of countries, of which most come from Ireland, Bangladesh, Pakistan, India, Indonesia, Nepal, Sri Lanka, South Korea, Laos, Mongolia, Thailand, the US, and many African countries.

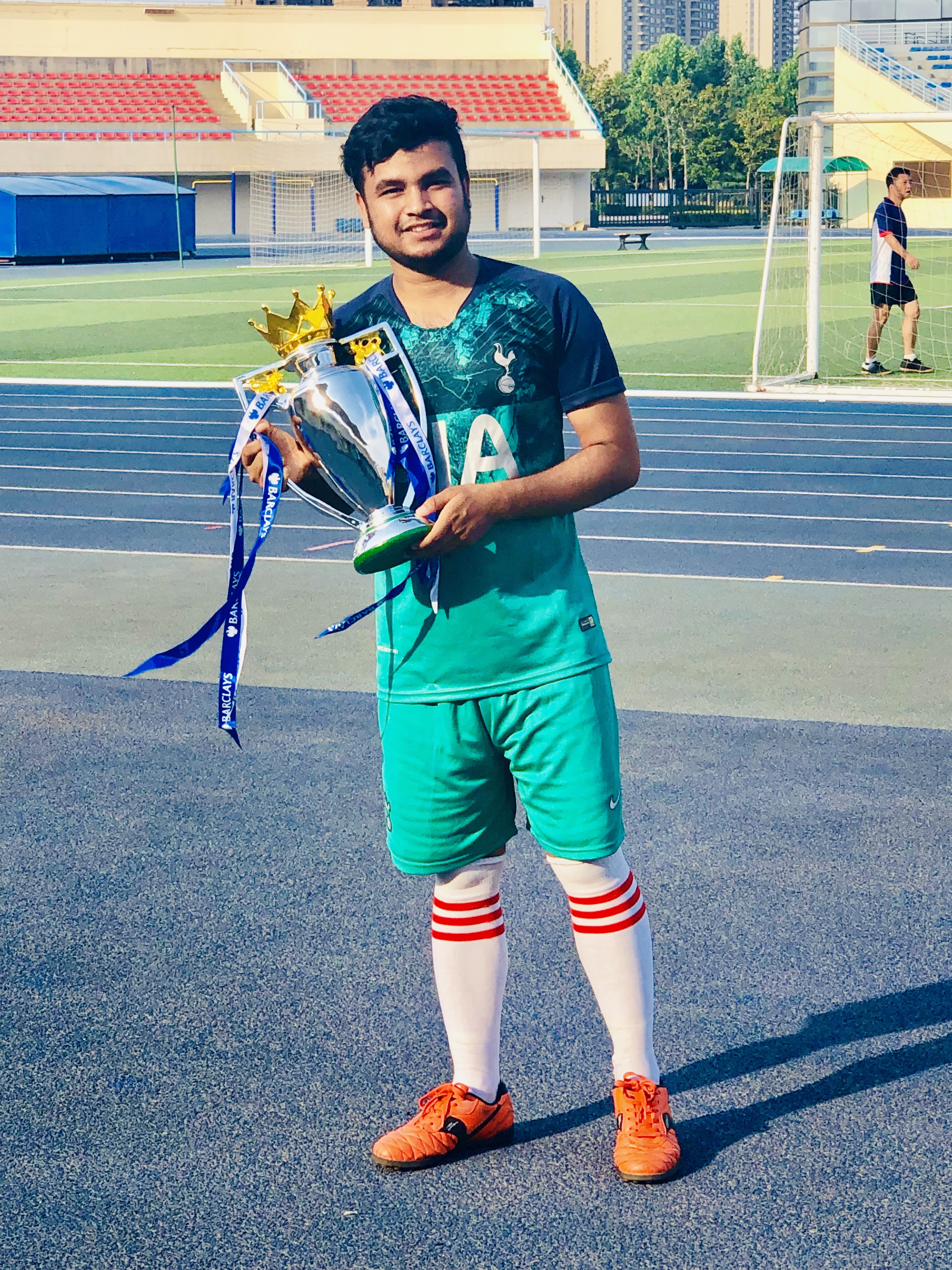
An international student holding a trophy after winning the university football tournament
