= Foreign Relations Law of the People's Republic of China =

Law of the People's Republic of China

The Law on Foreign Relations of the People's Republic of China

Standing Committee of the National People's Congress
- Passed by: Standing Committee of the National People's Congress
- Passed: 28 June 2023
- Signed by: President Xi Jinping
- Signed: 28 June 2023
- Commenced: 1 July 2023

Legislative history
- Introduced by: Council of Chairpersons
- First reading: 26–30 October 2022
- Second reading: 26–28 June 2023
- Status: In force

Foreign Relations Law of the People's Republic of China
- Simplified Chinese: 中华人民共和国对外关系法
- Traditional Chinese: 中華人民共和國對外關係法
Transcriptions
Standard Mandarin
- Hanyu Pinyin: Zhōnghuá Rénmín Gònghéguó Duìwài Guānxì Fǎ

The Foreign Relations Law of the People's Republic of China is a legislation concerning foreign affairs of China. It was passed by the Standing Committee of the National People's Congress on 28 June 2023 and came into effect on 1 July 2023. The law outlines the country's foreign policy goals and objectives, codifies the institutional framework of foreign policy decision-making. Notably, the law explicitly grants the Chinese Communist Party (CCP) authority over the foreign policy.

== Legislative history ==
The Foreign Relations Law was passed by the Standing Committee of the National People's Congress (NPCSC) on 28 June 2023, and was signed by Xi Jinping in his capacity as president in the same day. It came into effect on 1 July 2023.

== Provisions ==
The law concerns China's diplomatic relations with other countries, its exchanges and cooperation with those countries in economic, cultural and other areas, and the country's relations with the United Nations and other international organizations. It lays out China's official foreign policy goals to be:

- Safeguarding China's sovereignty, national security and development interests
- Protecting and promoting the interests of the Chinese people
- Building China into a great modernized socialist country
- Realizing the great rejuvenation of the Chinese nation
- Promoting world peace and development
- Building a community with a shared future for mankind

It also codifies other stated Chinese foreign policy objectives such as independent foreign policy of peace, five principles of peaceful coexistence, path of peaceful development and opening to the outside world.

=== Institutions ===
The Law explicitly states that China conducts its foreign policy "under the centralized and overall leadership" of the Chinese Communist Party (CCP). The CCP's Central Foreign Affairs Commission is granted the role of "policy making, deliberation and coordination relating to the conduct of foreign relations". According to the law, the National People's Congress and its Standing Committee "ratify or denounce treaties and important agreements concluded with other countries" and conduct activities and strengthen exchanges with "parliaments of foreign countries as well as international and regional parliamentary organizations". The president represents the state, the State Council "manages foreign affairs" and "concludes treaties and agreements with foreign countries", and the Central Military Commission conducts "international military exchanges and cooperation". The Ministry of Foreign Affairs "undertakes matters relating to diplomatic exchanges of Party and State leaders with foreign leaders" and "enhances guidance, coordination, management and service for international exchanges and cooperation conducted by other government departments and localities".

=== Ideology ===
The law specifies that the country conducts its foreign relations under the guidance of Marxism–Leninism, Mao Zedong Thought, Deng Xiaoping Theory, the Three Represents, the Scientific Outlook on Development, and Xi Jinping Thought on Socialism with Chinese Characteristics for a New Era. It also explicitly states that China "conducts foreign relations to uphold its system of socialism with Chinese characteristics, safeguard its sovereignty, unification and territorial integrity, and promote its economic and social development".

=== International system ===
The law codifies three of Xi's global initiatives: the Global Development Initiative, the Global Security Initiative, and the Global Civilization Initiative. It also states that China "upholds the international system with the United Nations at its core" and that it "observes the purposes and principles" of the Charter of the United Nations.

=== Countermeasures ===
The Article 33 of the Law states that China the right to "counter and restrictive measures", though this does not create new sanction mechanisms and largely overlaps with preexisting and more specific laws such as the Anti–Foreign Sanctions Law of 2021.

== Reactions ==
Central Foreign Affairs Commission Office Director Wang Yi, writing an op-ed to the People's Daily, wrote that the formulation of the law is to "thoroughly implement" Xi Jinping Thought, especially Xi Jinping Thought on Diplomacy and Xi Jinping Thought on the Rule of Law. He also wrote that the law was "an important measure to strengthen the Communist Party Central Committee’s centralized and unified leadership over foreign affairs". The state-run Global Times called it a "key step to enrich the legal toolbox against Western hegemony".
