= Minister of Emergency Management =

Minister of the People's Republic of China

Minister of Emergency Management of the People's Republic of China
- 中华人民共和国应急管理部部长
- National Emblem of China

- Flag of China
- Incumbent; Zhang Chengzhong since 30 April 2026
- Ministry of Emergency Management
- Status: Provincial and ministerial-level official
- Member of: Plenary Meeting of the State Council
- Seat: Ministry of Emergency Management Building, Xicheng District, Beijing
- Nominator: Premier (chosen within the Chinese Communist Party)
- Appointer: President with the confirmation of the National People's Congress or its Standing Committee
- Formation: 29 April 2018; 8 years ago
- First holder: Huang Ming
- Deputy: Vice Minister of Emergency Management

The minister of emergency management of the People's Republic of China is the head of the Ministry of Emergency Management of the People's Republic of China and a member of the State Council. Within the State Council, the position is twenty-third in order of precedence. The minister is responsible for leading the ministry, presiding over its meetings, and signing important documents related to the ministry. Officially, the minister is nominated by the premier of the State Council, who is then approved by the National People's Congress or its Standing Committee and appointed by the president.

== List of ministers ==
No.	Name	Took office	Left office	Notes
1	Huang Ming	April 29, 2018	July 29, 2022	
2	Wang Xiangxi	July 29, 2022	February 26, 2026	
3	Zhang Chengzhong	April 30, 2026	Incumbent	
