= Export Control Law of the People's Republic of China =

Standing Committee of the National People's Congress
- Passed by: Standing Committee of the National People's Congress
- Passed: 17 October 2020
- Signed by: President Xi Jinping
- Signed: 17 October 2020
- Commenced: 1 December 2020

Legislative history
- Introduced by: State Council of China
- First reading: 23–28 December 2019
- Second reading: 28–30 June 2020
- Third reading: 13–17 October 2020
- Status: In force

Export Control Law of the People's Republic of China
- Simplified Chinese: 中华人民共和国出口管制法
- Traditional Chinese: 中華人民共和國出口管制法
Transcriptions
Standard Mandarin
- Hanyu Pinyin: Zhōnghuá Rénmín Gònghéguó Chūkǒu Guǎnzhìfǎ

The Export Control Law of the People's Republic of China is a law of the People's Republic of China to promote and safeguard export control work. It was adopted at the 22nd meeting of the Standing Committee of the 13th National People's Congress on 17 October 2020, and came into effect on 1 December 2020.

== Background ==
Since the 1990s, China has successively formulated six administrative regulations on export control, including the Regulations on the Administration of Controlled Chemicals, the Regulations on Nuclear Export Control, the Regulations on the Administration of Military Products Export, the Regulations on Export Control of Nuclear Dual-Use Items and Related Technologies, the Regulations on Export Control of Missiles and Related Items and Technologies, and the Regulations on Export Control of Biological Dual-Use Items and Related Equipment and Technologies. Due to the lack of unified legislation, it is difficult to coordinate the enforcement practice of export control. In the context of the present era, export control has become an important means of safeguarding national security and interests. In major countries and regions of the world, such as the United States and the European Union, unified export control laws have been formulated and promulgated. Therefore, it is necessary for the People's Republic of China to promulgate a unified export control law.

== Legislative history ==
In 2017, the Ministry of Commerce took the lead in launching the drafting of the Export Control Law in accordance with the State Council's 2016 Legislative Work Plan and the State Council's 2017 Legislative Work Plan, and formed the Export Control Law (Draft for Solicitation of Opinions). The draft was released to the public on June 16, 2017, and opinions were solicited. On 23 December 2019, the 15th meeting of the Standing Committee of the 13th National People's Congress held its first plenary session to conduct the first reading of the draft law. Entrusted by the State Council, Minister of Commerce Zhong Shan gave an explanation of the draft. On 28 June 2020, the draft law was submitted to the 20th meeting of the Standing Committee of the 13th National People's Congress for its second review. Hu Keming, vice chairman of the Constitution and Law Committee of the National People's Congress, reported on the revisions.

On 13 October 2020, the 22nd meeting of the Standing Committee of the 13th National People's Congress conducted a third review of the draft law. According to the new provisions in the third draft, the export control items include data such as technical information related to the items. The third draft proposes that the national export control management department shall issue relevant industry export control guidelines in a timely manner to guide export operators to establish and improve internal compliance systems for export control and standardize operations. In addition, those who violate the provisions of this law by exporting controlled items that are prohibited from export by the country or exporting controlled items without permission shall be held criminally liable in accordance with the law; if any country or region abuses export control measures to endanger China's national security and interests, China may take reciprocal measures against that country or region according to the actual situation. After three reviews, the Export Control Law was passed on 17 October and promulgated by President Xi Jinping, and came into effect on 1 December 2020.

== Content ==
The Export Control Law consists of 5 chapters and 49 articles, including general provisions, control policies, control lists and control measures, supervision and management, legal responsibilities and supplementary provisions. According to the law, in addition to traditional dual-use items, military products and nuclear products, other "goods, technologies and services" related to maintaining national security and interests and fulfilling international obligations such as non-proliferation are also included in the controlled items, with reference to the foreign trade classification standards. In addition, the transfer of controlled items from China to foreign countries, as well as the provision of controlled items by Chinese citizens, legal persons and unincorporated organizations to foreign organizations and individuals, are all subject to this law. Furthermore, if any country or region abuses export control measures and endangers China's national security and interests, the Chinese government may take reciprocal measures against that country or region according to the actual situation. The law also makes detailed provisions on export control lists, temporary controls and comprehensive controls, export business qualifications and export licensing system, end-user and end-use management, etc.

The Export Control Law also stipulates that China implements a licensing system for the export of controlled items. Exporters must apply for a license to export any item listed in the control list or subject to temporary control. Fines are imposed for illegal transactions: "If an exporter engages in the export of controlled items without obtaining the relevant export operating qualifications, a warning shall be given, the illegal act shall be ordered to be stopped, the illegal gains shall be confiscated, and if the illegal business amount is more than RMB 500,000, a fine of not less than five times and not more than ten times the illegal business amount shall be imposed; if there is no illegal business amount or the illegal business amount is less than RMB 500,000, a fine of not less than RMB 500,000 and not more than RMB 5 million shall be imposed." In addition, similar to the export controls and economic sanctions of the United States, the law also allows the Ministry of Economy of China to punish overseas organizations or individuals who violate the Export Control Law.
