= List of presidential orders during the 12th National People's Congress =

The first session of the 12th National People's Congress (NPC) was held in Beijing from March 5 to March 17, 2013. Xi Jinping was elected as the new president of the People's Republic of China, replacing Hu Jintao. During the 12th NPC, Xi issued 86 presidential decrees. The first, issued on March 15, 2013, appointed Li Keqiang as Premier of the State Council. The last presidential decree (No. 86) issued during the 12th NPC was issued on December 27, 2017, promulgating the Decision of the Standing Committee of the National People's Congress on Amending the 'Tendering and Bidding Law of the People's Republic of China' and the 'Measurement Law of the People's Republic of China'.

== List ==
Click the link at the number below to go to Wikisource to view the original text of the Presidential Decree.

List of Presidential Decrees of the People's Republic of China issued during the Twelfth National People's Congress
Number	Content	Date signed	Ref.
1	Li Keqiang was appointed Premier of the State Council of the People's Republic of China.	March 15, 2013	
2	Zhang Gaoli, Liu Yandong, Wang Yang, and Ma Kai were appointed Vice Premiers of the State Council; Yang Jing, Chang Wanquan, Yang Jiechi, Guo Shengkun, and Wang Yong were appointed State Councilors; Yang Jing was appointed Secretary-General of the State Council; Wang Yi was appointed Minister of Foreign Affairs; Chang Wanquan was appointed Minister of National Defense; Xu Shaoshi was appointed Director of the National Development and Reform Commission; Yuan Guiren was appointed Minister of Education; Wan Gang was appointed Minister of Science and Technology; Miao Wei was appointed Minister of Industry and Information Technology; Wang Zhengwei was appointed Director of the State Ethnic Affairs Commission; Guo Shengkun was appointed Minister of Public Security; Geng Huichang was appointed Minister of State Security; Huang Shuxian was appointed Minister of Supervision; and Li Liguo was appointed... He was appointed Minister of Civil Affairs; Wu Aiying was appointed Minister of Justice; Lou Jiwei was appointed Minister of Finance; Yin Weimin was appointed Minister of Human Resources and Social Security; Jiang Daming was appointed Minister of Land and Resources; Zhou Shengxian was appointed Minister of Environmental Protection; Jiang Weixin was appointed Minister of Housing and Urban-Rural Development; Yang Chuantang was appointed Minister of Transport; Chen Lei was appointed Minister of Water Resources; Han Changfu was appointed Minister of Agriculture; Gao Hucheng was appointed Minister of Commerce; Cai Wu was appointed Minister of Culture; Li Bin was appointed Director of the National Health and Family Planning Commission; Zhou Xiaochuan was appointed Governor of the People's Bank of China; and Liu Jiayi was appointed Auditor General of the National Audit Office.	March 16, 2013	
3	The Tourism Law of the People's Republic of China was promulgated.	April 25, 2013	
4	The " Special Equipment Safety Law of the People's Republic of China " was promulgated.	June 29, 2013	
5	The Standing Committee of the National People's Congress issued a decision to amend twelve laws, including the Law of the People's Republic of China on the Protection of Cultural Relics.	June 29, 2013	
6	The Standing Committee of the National People's Congress issued the " Decision on Amending the Trademark Law of the People's Republic of China ".	August 30, 2013	
7	The Standing Committee of the National People's Congress issued a decision to amend the Consumer Rights Protection Law of the People's Republic of China.	October 25, 2013	
8	The Standing Committee of the National People's Congress issued a decision to amend seven laws, including the Marine Environmental Protection Law of the People's Republic of China.	December 28, 2013	
9	The revised version of the Environmental Protection Law of the People's Republic of China was promulgated on April 24, 2014.	April 24, 2014	
10	The Standing Committee of the National People's Congress issued a decision to amend the Law of the People's Republic of China on the Protection of Military Facilities.	June 27, 2014	
11	Jiang Weixin was removed from his post as Minister of Housing and Urban-Rural Development; Chen Zhenggao was appointed as Minister of Housing and Urban-Rural Development.	June 27, 2014	
12	The Standing Committee of the National People's Congress issued the " Decision on Amending the Budget Law of the People's Republic of China ".	August 31, 2014	
13	The Standing Committee of the National People's Congress issued the " Decision on Amending the Law of the People's Republic of China on Work Safety ".	August 31, 2014	
14	The Standing Committee of the National People's Congress issued a decision to amend five laws, including the Insurance Law of the People's Republic of China.	August 31, 2014	
15	The Standing Committee of the National People's Congress issued the " Decision on Amending the Administrative Litigation Law of the People's Republic of China ".	November 1, 2014	
16	The Anti-Espionage Law of the People's Republic of China was promulgated.	November 1, 2014	
17	The Navigation Law of the People's Republic of China was promulgated.	December 28, 2014	
18	Cai Wu was removed from his post as Minister of Culture; Luo Shugang was appointed Minister of Culture.	December 28, 2014	
19	Zhou Shengxian was removed from his post as Minister of Environmental Protection; Chen Jining was appointed as Minister of Environmental Protection.	February 27, 2015	
20	The National People's Congress has announced the " Decision on Amending the Legislation Law of the People's Republic of China".	March 15, 2015	
21	The revised version of the Food Safety Law of the People's Republic of China, issued on April 24, 2015, was published.	April 24, 2015	
22	The revised version of the Advertising Law of the People's Republic of China, issued on April 24, 2015, was published.	April 24, 2015	
23	The Standing Committee of the National People's Congress issued a decision to amend seven laws, including the Port Law of the People's Republic of China.	April 24, 2015	
24	The Standing Committee of the National People's Congress issued a decision to amend six laws, including the Electricity Law of the People's Republic of China.	April 24, 2015	
25	The Standing Committee of the National People's Congress issued a decision to amend five laws, including the Compulsory Education Law of the People's Republic of China.	April 24, 2015	
26	The Standing Committee of the National People's Congress issued the " Decision on Amending Five Laws Including the Measurement Law of the People's Republic of China ".	April 24, 2015	
27	The Standing Committee of the National People's Congress issued the " Decision on Amending the Drug Administration Law of the People's Republic of China ".	April 24, 2015	
28	The Standing Committee of the National People's Congress issued the " Decision on Amending the Law of the People's Republic of China on the Protection of Cultural Relics ".	April 24, 2015	
29	The National Security Law of the People's Republic of China was promulgated.	July 1, 2015	
30	The Ninth Amendment to the Criminal Law of the People's Republic of China was promulgated.	August 29, 2015	
31	The revised version of the " Law of the People's Republic of China on the Prevention and Control of Atmospheric Pollution " was promulgated on August 29, 2015.	August 29, 2015	
32	The Standing Committee of the National People's Congress issued a decision to amend the Law of the People's Republic of China on Promoting the Transformation of Scientific and Technological Achievements.	August 29, 2015	
33	The Standing Committee of the National People's Congress promulgated the " Decision on Amending the Law of the People's Republic of China on the Organization of Local People's Congresses and Local People's Governments at All Levels, the Electoral Law of the National People's Congress and Local People's Congresses at All Levels, and the Law of the People's Republic of China on Deputies to the National People's Congress and Local People's Congresses at All Levels ".	August 29, 2015	
34	The Standing Committee of the National People's Congress issued the " Decision on Amending the Commercial Banking Law of the People's Republic of China ".	August 29, 2015	
35	The revised version of the Seed Law of the People's Republic of China, issued on November 4, 2015, was promulgated.	November 4, 2015	
36	The Anti-Terrorism Law of the People's Republic of China was promulgated.	December 27, 2015	
37	The Anti-Domestic Violence Law of the People's Republic of China was promulgated.	December 27, 2015	
38	The " Law of the People's Republic of China on National Medals and National Honorary Titles " was promulgated.	December 27, 2015	
39	The Standing Committee of the National People's Congress issued the " Decision on Amending the Education Law of the People's Republic of China ".	December 27, 2015	
40	The Standing Committee of the National People's Congress issued the " Decision on Amending the Higher Education Law of the People's Republic of China ".	December 27, 2015	
41	The Standing Committee of the National People's Congress issued the " Decision on Amending the Population and Family Planning Law of the People's Republic of China ".	December 27, 2015	
42	The " Law of the People's Republic of China on the Exploration and Development of Resources in the Deep Seabed Area " was promulgated.	February 26, 2016	
43	The Charity Law of the People's Republic of China was promulgated.	March 16, 2016	
44	The " Law of the People's Republic of China on the Administration of the Activities of Overseas Non-Governmental Organizations within the Territory of China " was promulgated.	April 28, 2016	
45	Wang Zhengwei ( Hui nationality ) was removed from his post as Director of the State Ethnic Affairs Commission; Batel ( Mongolian nationality ) was appointed as Director of the State Ethnic Affairs Commission.	April 28, 2016	
46	The " Asset Appraisal Law of the People's Republic of China " was promulgated.	July 2, 2016	
47	The revised version of the Wildlife Protection Law of the People's Republic of China, effective July 2, 2016, was published.	July 2, 2016	
48	The Standing Committee of the National People's Congress issued a decision to amend six laws, including the Energy Conservation Law of the People's Republic of China.	July 2, 2016	
49	Yuan Guiren was removed from his post as Minister of Education; Chen Baosheng was appointed as Minister of Education.	July 2, 2016	
50	The National Defense Transportation Law of the People's Republic of China was promulgated.	September 3, 2016	
51	The Standing Committee of the National People's Congress issued a decision to amend four laws, including the Law of the People's Republic of China on Foreign-Invested Enterprises.	September 3, 2016	
52	Yang Chuantang was removed from his post as Minister of Transport; Li Xiaopeng was appointed as Minister of Transport.	September 3, 2016	
53	The Cybersecurity Law of the People's Republic of China was promulgated.	November 7, 2016	
54	The " Film Industry Promotion Law of the People's Republic of China " was promulgated.	November 7, 2016	
55	The Standing Committee of the National People's Congress issued the " Decision on Amending the Law of the People's Republic of China on the Promotion of Private Education ".	November 7, 2016	
56	The Standing Committee of the National People's Congress issued the " Decision on Amending the Marine Environmental Protection Law of the People's Republic of China ".	November 7, 2016	
57	The Standing Committee of the National People's Congress issued a decision to amend twelve laws, including the Foreign Trade Law of the People's Republic of China.	November 7, 2016	
58	Geng Huichang is removed from the post of Minister of State Security; Chen Wenqing is appointed Minister of State Security. Li Liguo is removed from the post of Minister of Civil Affairs; Huang Shuxian is appointed Minister of Civil Affairs and removed from the post of Minister of Supervision. Lou Jiwei is removed from the post of Minister of Finance; Xiao Jie is appointed Minister of Finance.	November 7, 2016	
59	The Law of the People's Republic of China on Traditional Chinese Medicine was promulgated.	December 25, 2016	
60	The " Law of the People's Republic of China on Guaranteeing Public Cultural Services " was promulgated.	December 25, 2016	
61	The Environmental Protection Tax Law of the People's Republic of China was promulgated.	December 25, 2016	
62	Yang Xiaodu was appointed Minister of Supervision.	December 25, 2016	
63	The revised version of the " Law of the People's Republic of China on the Red Cross Society " was published on February 24, 2017.	February 24, 2017	
64	The Standing Committee of the National People's Congress issued the " Decision on Amending the Enterprise Income Tax Law of the People's Republic of China ".	February 24, 2017	
65	Xu Shaoshi is removed from his post as Director of the National Development and Reform Commission; He Lifeng is appointed as Director of the National Development and Reform Commission. Wu Aiying is removed from her post as Minister of Justice; Zhang Jun is appointed as Minister of Justice. Gao Hucheng is removed from his post as Minister of Commerce; Zhong Shan is appointed as Minister of Commerce.	February 24, 2017	
66	The General Provisions of the Civil Law of the People's Republic of China were promulgated.	March 15, 2017	
67	The revised version of the " Surveying and Mapping Law of the People's Republic of China " was published on April 27, 2017.	April 27, 2017	
68	Liu Jiayi was removed from the post of Auditor General of the National Audit Office; Hu Zejun (female) was appointed as Auditor General of the National Audit Office.	April 27, 2017	
69	The National Intelligence Law of the People's Republic of China was promulgated.	June 27, 2017	
70	The Standing Committee of the National People's Congress issued the " Decision on Amending the Water Pollution Prevention and Control Law of the People's Republic of China ".	June 27, 2017	
71	The Standing Committee of the National People's Congress issued the " Decision on Amending the Civil Procedure Law of the People's Republic of China and the Administrative Procedure Law of the People's Republic of China ".	June 27, 2017	
72	Chen Jining is removed from his post as Minister of Environmental Protection; Li Ganjie is appointed as Minister of Environmental Protection. Chen Zhenggao is removed from his post as Minister of Housing and Urban-Rural Development; Wang Menghui is appointed as Minister of Housing and Urban-Rural Development.	June 27, 2017	
73	The Nuclear Safety Law of the People's Republic of China was promulgated.	September 1, 2017	
74	The revised version of the " Law of the People's Republic of China on the Promotion of Small and Medium-sized Enterprises " was published on September 1, 2017.	September 1, 2017	
75	The National Anthem Law of the People's Republic of China was promulgated.	September 1, 2017	
76	The Standing Committee of the National People's Congress issued a decision to amend eight laws, including the Judges Law of the People's Republic of China.	September 1, 2017	
77	The revised version of the Anti-Unfair Competition Law of the People's Republic of China, issued on November 4, 2017, was published.	November 4, 2017	
78	The revised version of the Standardization Law of the People's Republic of China, issued on November 4, 2017, was published.	November 4, 2017	
79	The Public Library Law of the People's Republic of China was promulgated.	November 4, 2017	
80	The Amendment (X) to the Criminal Law of the People's Republic of China was promulgated.	November 4, 2017	
81	The Standing Committee of the National People's Congress issued a decision to amend eleven laws, including the Accounting Law of the People's Republic of China.	November 4, 2017	
82	Guo Shengkun was relieved of his concurrent post as Minister of Public Security; Zhao Kezhi was appointed as Minister of Public Security.	November 4, 2017	
83	The revised version of the " Law of the People's Republic of China on Farmers' Specialized Cooperatives " was published on December 27, 2017.	December 27, 2017	
84	The Tobacco Leaf Tax Law of the People's Republic of China was promulgated.	December 27, 2017	
85	The " Ship Tonnage Tax Law of the People's Republic of China " was promulgated.	December 27, 2017	
86	The Standing Committee of the National People's Congress issued the " Decision on Amending the Bidding Law of the People's Republic of China and the Measurement Law of the People's Republic of China ".	December 27, 2017	
