= Ministry of Emergency Management =

Government agency of China

Ministry of Emergency Management of the People's Republic of China
- 中华人民共和国应急管理部
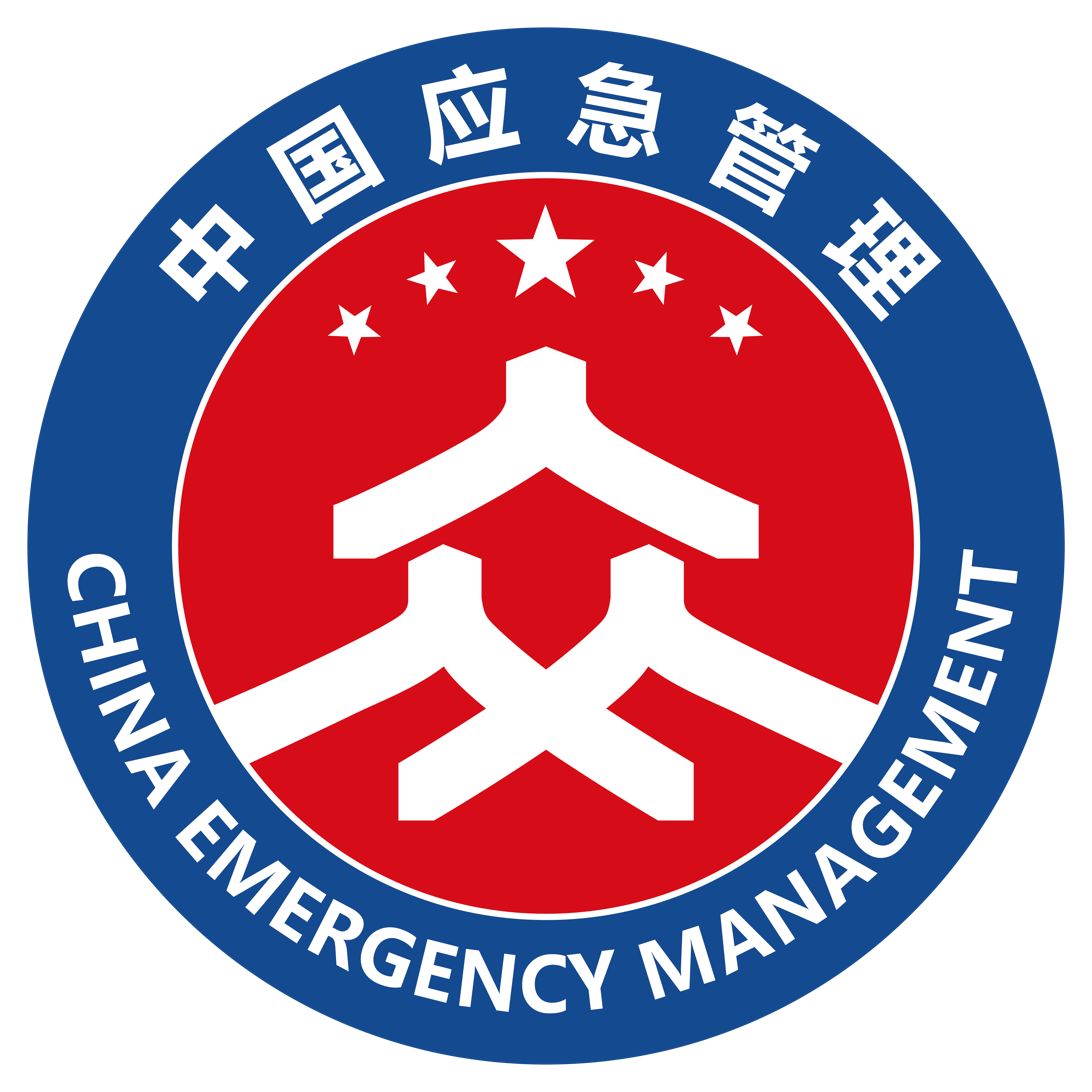

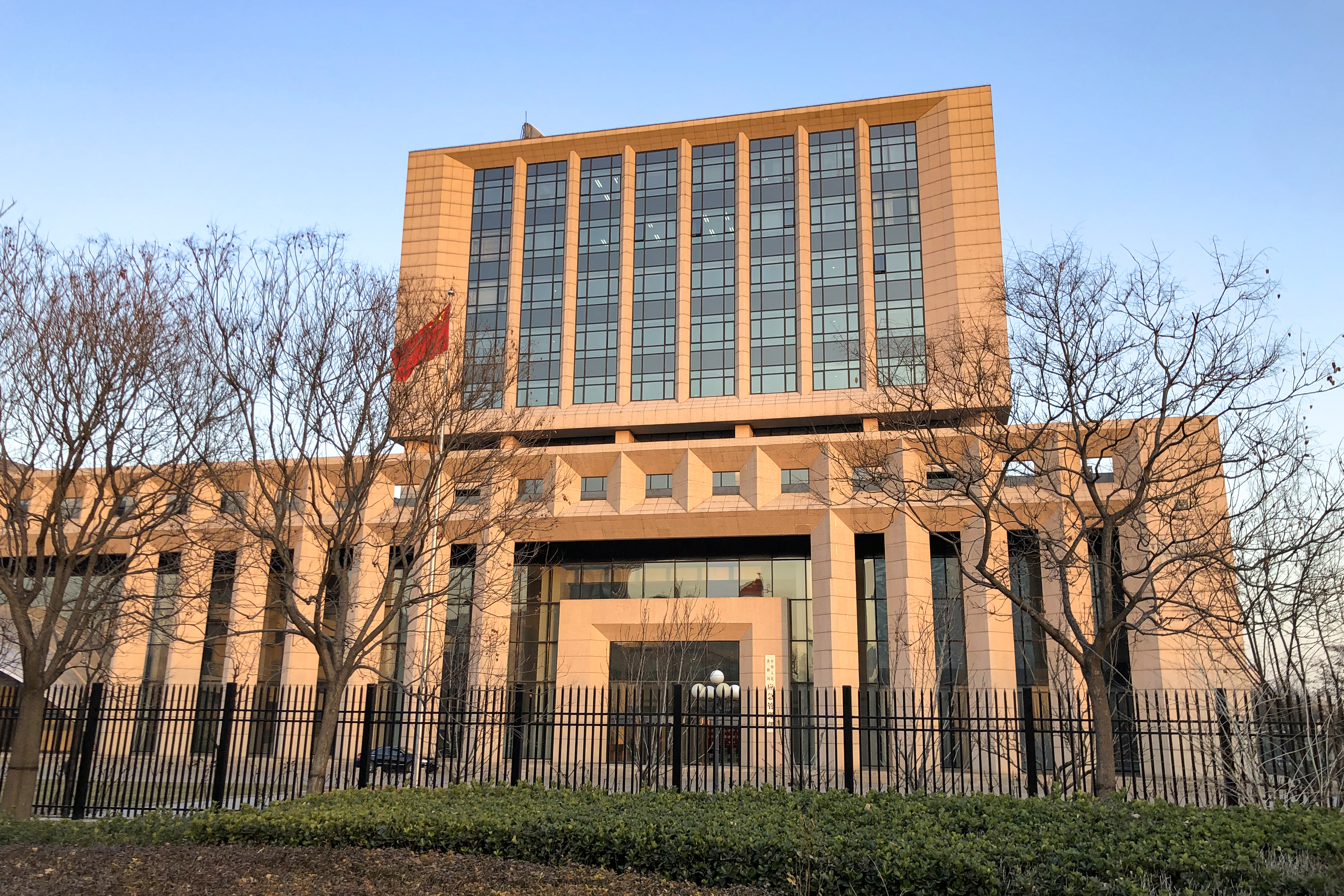

Agency overview
- Formed: 19 March 2018; 8 years ago
- Jurisdiction: Government of China
- Headquarters: Beijing
- Motto: 对党忠诚 纪律严明 赴汤蹈火 竭诚为民 (lit. Keep loyal to the party, Force strictly in discipline, Leap into a boiling cauldron or a blazing fire, Wholeheartedly for the people)
- Minister responsible: Zhang Chengzhong, Minister
- Deputy Ministers responsible: Xu Jiaai; Song Yuanming, Director of National Production Emergency Rescue Center; Wang Daoxi; Xu Ping, Political Commissar of National Fire and Rescue Bureau; Min Yiren, Director of China Earthquake Administration; Qiong Se, Director of National Fire and Rescue Bureau; Huang Jinsheng, Director of National Mine Safety Inspection Bureau
- Agency executives: Hao Junhui, Director of Political Department; Pu Yufei, Leader of Discipline Inspection & Supervision Team; Peng Xiaoguo, Deputy Director of National Forestry and Grassland Administration
- Parent agency: State Council
- Website: www.mem.gov.cn

Chinese name
- Traditional Chinese: 中華人民共和國應急管理部
- Simplified Chinese: 中华人民共和国应急管理部
Transcriptions
Standard Mandarin
- Hanyu Pinyin: Zhōnghuá Rénmín Gònghéguó Yìngjí Guǎnlǐ Bù

The Ministry of Emergency Management (MEM) is the 24th-ranked constituent department of the State Council of China, responsible for the country's emergency management, work safety, and emergency rescue. It is the result of a merger from emergency management departments in various ministries due to a State Council reform in 2018.

== History ==
MEM was established in March 2018 as part of the deepening the reform of the Party and state institutions as a result of a merger from emergency management departments in various ministries. In addition, it took over the functions of the People's Armed Police's China Fire Services and Forestry Corps, which is today China Fire and Rescue. It established the China Search and Rescue team, which replaced the China International Search and Rescue Team in 2018. China Search and Rescue is staffed by civilian Ministry personnel.

== Functions ==
The Ministry organizes preparations for overall national emergency plans, guides the work of regions and departments in responding to emergencies, promotes the development of emergency plan systems and exercises, and builds disaster prevention and relief systems.
