= List of vice premiers of China =

This is a list of the vice premiers of the People's Republic of China since 1949.

In the People's Republic of China premiers elected by delegation of the National People's Congress every five years also are limited to two terms.

== List of vice premiers ==
The vice premiership of the PRC was created since the establishment of the People's Republic of China on 1 October 1949.

Generations of leadership

First Administration Second Administration Third Administration Hu–Wen Administration Xi–Li Administration

No.	Portrait	First-ranked Vice-Premier	NPC	Term of office		Premiers
Vice Premiers of the Government Administration Council of the Central People's Government (1949–54)						Zhou Enlai
—		Dong Biwu 董必武 (1886–1975); Hubei At-large	CP	1 October 1949	15 September 1954	Zhou Enlai
—		Dong Biwu 董必武 (1886–1975); Hubei At-large	Other Vice-Premiers: Chen Yun (2nd) / Guo Moruo (3rd) / Huang Yanpei (4th) / Deng Xiaoping (5th)			Zhou Enlai
Vice Premiers of the State Council of the People's Republic of China (1954–present)						Zhou Enlai
1		Chen Yun 陈云 (1905–1995); Shanghai At-large	I	15 September 1954	18 April 1959	Zhou Enlai
1		Chen Yun 陈云 (1905–1995); Shanghai At-large	Other Vice-Premiers: Lin Biao (2nd), Peng Dehuai (3rd), Deng Xiaoping (4th), Deng Zihui (5th), He Long (6th), Chen Yi (7th), Ulanhu (8th), Li Fuchun (9th), Li Xiannian (10th)			Zhou Enlai
1		Chen Yun 陈云 (1905–1995); Shanghai At-large	II	18 April 1959	21 December 1964	Zhou Enlai
1		Chen Yun 陈云 (1905–1995); Shanghai At-large	Other Vice-Premiers: Lin Biao (2nd), Peng Dehuai (3rd), Deng Xiaoping (4th), Deng Zihui (5th), He Long (6th), Chen Yi (7th), Ulanhu (8th), Li Fuchun (9th), Li Xiannian (10th), Nie Rongzhen (11th), Bo Yibo (12th), Tan Zhenlin (13th), Lu Dingyi (14th), Luo Ruiqing (15th), Xi Zhongxun (16th)			Zhou Enlai
2		Lin Biao 林彪 (1907–1971); PLA At-large	III	21 December 1964	13 September 1971 (died in office)	Zhou Enlai
2		Lin Biao 林彪 (1907–1971); PLA At-large	Other Vice-Premiers: Chen Yun (2nd), Deng Xiaoping (3rd), He Long (4th), Chen Yi (5th), Ke Qingshi (6th), Ulanhu (7th), Li Fuchun (8th), Li Xiannian (9th), Tan Zhenlin (10th), Nie Rongzhen (11th), Bo Yibo (12th), Lu Dingyi (13th), Luo Ruiqing (14th), Tao Zhu (15th), Xie Fuzhi (16th)			Zhou Enlai
3		Deng Xiaoping 邓小平 (1904–1997); Beijing At-large	III (cont)	13 September 1971 (acting)	4 January 1975	Zhou Enlai
3		Deng Xiaoping 邓小平 (1904–1997); Beijing At-large	Other Vice-Premiers: Chen Yun (2nd), He Long (3rd), Chen Yi (4th), Ke Qingshi (5th), Ulanhu (6th), Li Fuchun (7th), Li Xiannian (8th), Tan Zhenlin (9th), Nie Rongzhen (10th), Bo Yibo (11th), Lu Dingyi (12th), Luo Ruiqing (13th), Tao Zhu (14th), Xie Fuzhi (15th)			Zhou Enlai
3		Deng Xiaoping 邓小平 (1904–1997); Beijing At-large	IV	4 January 1975	5 March 1978	Zhou Enlai (1975–1976); Hua Guofeng* (1976–1978)
3		Deng Xiaoping 邓小平 (1904–1997); Beijing At-large	Other Vice-Premiers: Zhang Chunqiao (2nd), Li Xiannian (3rd), Chen Xilian (4th), Ji Dengkui (5th), Hua Guofeng* (6th), Chen Yonggui (7th), Wu Guixian (8th), Wang Zhen (9th), Yu Qiuli (10th), Gu Mu, Sun Jian (11th)			Zhou Enlai (1975–1976); Hua Guofeng* (1976–1978)
3		Deng Xiaoping 邓小平 (1904–1997); Beijing At-large	V	5 March 1978	10 September 1980 (resigned)	Hua Guofeng
3		Deng Xiaoping 邓小平 (1904–1997); Beijing At-large	Other Vice-Premiers: Li Xiannian (2nd), Xu Xiangqian (3rd), Ji Dengkui (4th), Yu Qiuli (5th), Chen Xilian (6th), Geng Biao (7th), Chen Yonggui (8th), Fang Yi (9th), Wang Zhen (10th), Gu Mu (11th), Kang Shi'en (12th), Chen Muhua (13th)			Hua Guofeng
4		Wan Li 万里 (1916–2015); Anhui At-large	V (cont)	10 September 1980 (acting)	6 June 1983	Zhao Ziyang
4		Wan Li 万里 (1916–2015); Anhui At-large	Other Vice-Premiers: Li Xiannian (2nd), Xu Xiangqian (3rd), Ji Dengkui (4th), Yu Qiuli (5th), Chen Xilian (6th), Geng Biao (7th), Chen Yonggui (8th), Fang Yi (9th), Wang Zhen (10th), Gu Mu (11th), Kang Shi'en (12th), Chen Muhua (13th)			Zhao Ziyang
4		Wan Li 万里 (1916–2015); Anhui At-large	VI	6 June 1983	25 March 1988	Zhao Ziyang (1980–1987); Li Peng* (1987–1988)
4		Wan Li 万里 (1916–2015); Anhui At-large	Other Vice-Premiers: Yao Yilin (2nd), Li Peng* (3rd), Tian Jiyun (4th), later: Qiao Shi			Zhao Ziyang (1980–1987); Li Peng* (1987–1988)
5		Yao Yilin 姚依林 (1917–1994); Jiangxi At-large	VII	25 March 1988	5 March 1993	Li Peng
5		Yao Yilin 姚依林 (1917–1994); Jiangxi At-large	Other Vice-Premiers: Tian Jiyun (2nd), Wu Xueqian (3rd), later: Zou Jiahua, Zhu Rongji			Li Peng
6		Zhu Rongji 朱镕基 (1928–2026); Hunan At-large	VIII	25 March 1993	17 March 1998	Li Peng
6		Zhu Rongji 朱镕基 (1928–2026); Hunan At-large	Other Vice-Premiers: Zou Jiahua (2nd), Qian Qichen (3rd), Li Lanqing (4th), later: Wu Bangguo, Jiang Chunyun			Li Peng
7		Li Lanqing 李岚清 (1932–); Jiangsu At-large	IX	17 March 1998	17 March 2003	Zhu Rongji
7		Li Lanqing 李岚清 (1932–); Jiangsu At-large	Other Vice-Premiers: Qian Qichen (2nd) / Wu Bangguo (3rd) / Wen Jiabao (4th)			Zhu Rongji
8		Huang Ju 黄菊 (1938–2007); Shanghai At-large	X	17 March 2003	2 June 2007 (died in office)	Wen Jiabao
8		Huang Ju 黄菊 (1938–2007); Shanghai At-large	Other Vice-Premiers: Wu Yi (2nd) / Zeng Peiyan (3rd) / Hui Liangyu (4th)			Wen Jiabao
—		Wu Yi 吴仪 (1938–); Zhejiang At-large	X (cont)	2 June 2007 (acting)	17 March 2008	Wen Jiabao
—		Wu Yi 吴仪 (1938–); Zhejiang At-large	Other Vice-Premiers: Zeng Peiyan (2nd) / Hui Liangyu (3rd)			Wen Jiabao
9		Li Keqiang 李克强 (1955–2023); Liaoning At-large	XI	17 March 2008	15 March 2013	Wen Jiabao
9		Li Keqiang 李克强 (1955–2023); Liaoning At-large	Other Vice-Premiers: Hui Liangyu (2nd) / Zhang Dejiang (3rd) / Wang Qishan (4th)			Wen Jiabao
10		Zhang Gaoli 张高丽 (1947–); Tianjin At-large	XII	16 March 2013	19 March 2018	Li Keqiang
10		Zhang Gaoli 张高丽 (1947–); Tianjin At-large	Other Vice-Premiers: Liu Yandong (2nd) / Wang Yang (3rd) / Ma Kai (4th)			Li Keqiang
11		Han Zheng 韩正 (1955–); Shaanxi At-large	XIII	19 March 2018	12 March 2023	Li Keqiang
11		Han Zheng 韩正 (1955–); Shaanxi At-large	Other Vice-Premiers: Sun Chunlan (2nd) / Hu Chunhua (3rd) / Liu He (4th)			Li Keqiang
12		Ding Xuexiang 丁薛祥 (1961–); Jiangsu At-large	XIV	12 March 2023	Incumbent	Li Qiang
12		Ding Xuexiang 丁薛祥 (1961–); Jiangsu At-large	Other Vice-Premiers: He Lifeng (2nd) / Zhang Guoqing (3rd) / Liu Guozhong (4th)			Li Qiang

== See also ==
- List of premiers of the People's Republic of China
- List of presidents of the People's Republic of China
