= Bi Jingquan =

Chinese politician

- 毕井泉
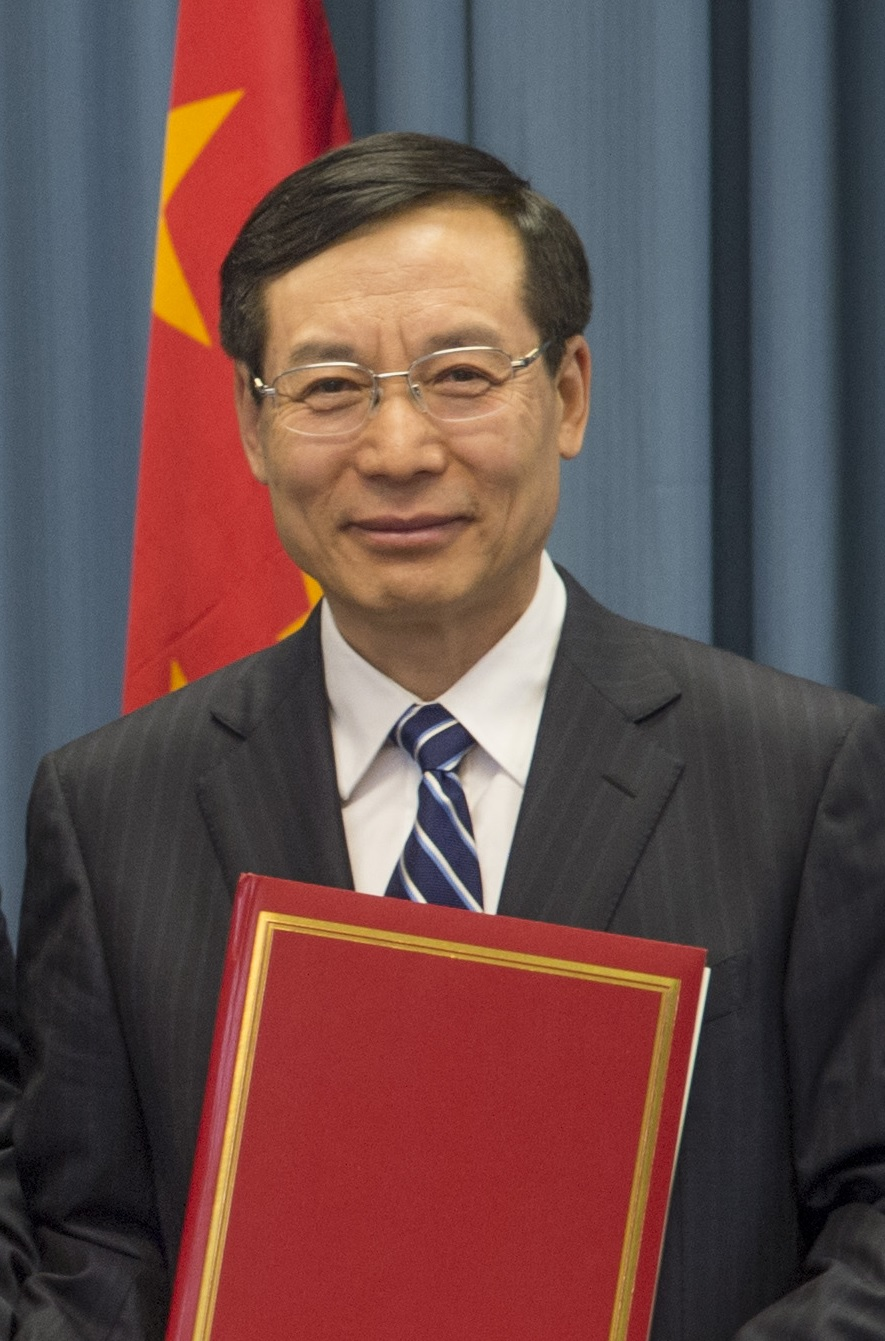

Director of the China Food and Drug Administration
- In office January 2015 – March 2018
- Preceded by: Zhang Yong
- Succeeded by: Office abolished

Deputy Secretary-General of the State Council
- In office 18 March 2008 – April 2015

Personal details
- Born: September 1955 (age 70–71) Suihua, Heilongjiang, China
- Party: Chinese Communist Party (1978–2025; expelled)
- Education: Peking University

Chinese name
- Simplified Chinese: 毕井泉
- Traditional Chinese: 畢井泉
Transcriptions
Standard Mandarin
- Hanyu Pinyin: Bì Jǐngquán

Bi Jingquan (Chinese: 毕井泉; born September 1955) is a former Chinese politician who was director of the China Food and Drug Administration from 2015 to 2018.

After the office was merged into the State Administration for Market Regulation (SAMR) in March 2018, he became the party secretary of SAMR. He was formerly a deputy secretary-general of the State Council.

Until his arrest in 2025 he served as the Vice Chairman of the China Center for International Economic Exchanges.

== Biography ==
Bi Jingquan graduated from the Economics Department of Peking University in 1982.

He has over twenty years experience in price control. He was editor-in-chief of Time-Bargain, published in 1994. In 2001, he worked on the resolution of problems produced by China's entry into the World Trade Organization. he also led his group to complete a report entitled Countermeasures Research on Promoting Competence of China's Various Industries in the Transitional Term. In 2004, he compiled the planning outline for the development of China's logistic industry. He also wrote and released many articles on topics such as trade, circulation, economic reforms and price administration. Bi is currently vice-president of the China Consumer Association, director of the China Cereal Economic Institution and executive director of the China Price Study Society.

He was also a member of the 14th National Committee of the Chinese People's Political Consultative Conference.

== Downfall ==
On 29 May 2025, Bi was put under investigation for alleged "serious violations of discipline and laws" by the Central Commission for Discipline Inspection (CCDI), the party's internal disciplinary body, and the National Supervisory Commission, the highest anti-corruption agency of China. On December 8, he was expelled from the CCP and dismissed from public office.

On 15 September 2026, Bi was sentenced to 14 years in prison at Jinan Intermediate People's Court, for taking bribes in 57.42 million yuan.

Government offices
Preceded by Zhang Ping	Deputy Director of the National Development and Reform Commission; 2006–2008	Succeeded by Liu Tienan
Preceded by Zhang Ping	Deputy Secretary-General of the State Council; 2008–2015	Succeeded by Jiang Zelin
Preceded by Zhang Yong	Director of the China Food and Drug Administration; 2015–2018	Succeeded by Office abolished
