= Belt and Road Construction Leadership Group =

Chinese government body

- 国家推进“一带一路”建设工作领导小组
- In 1999, the seal was 5 cm in diameter and the central issue of the five-pointed star was issued by the State Council.
- Established: 2015; 11 years ago
- Type: Deliberative and coordinating body of the State Council
- Location(s): The State promotes the “Belt and Road” construction leading group office No. 38, Yuetan South Street, Xicheng District, Beijing (Office of National Development and Reform Commission) 100824
- Group leader: Han Zheng (Deputy Premier of the State Council)
- Deputy leaders(4): Yang Jiechi (Director of the Office of the Central Foreign Affairs Working Committee); Hu Chunhua (Deputy Premier of the State Council); Xiao Jie (State Councilor and Secretary General of the State Council); He Lifeng (Director of the National Development and Reform Commission)
- Office manager: He Lifeng (also)
- Parent organization: National People's Congress
- Website: www.yidaiyilu.gov.cn

The Belt and Road construction leadership group (Chinese: 国家推进“一带一路”建设工作领导小组) (also called Leading Group for Promoting the Belt and Road Initiative) is the deliberative and coordinating body of the State Council to promote the Belt and Road Initiative. State Council leader Han Zheng is the core and the China National Development and Reform Commission is the main body.

== History ==
In September and October 2013, Xi Jinping, during his visit to Central Asia and Southeast Asian countries, proposed the "Silk Road Economic Belts" and the "21st Century Maritime Silk Road" initiatives. The eighth meeting of the Central Committee of the Chinese Communist Party's Financial and Economic Leading Group, held in November 2014, proposed to accelerate the construction of the Silk Road Economic Belt and the 21st Century Maritime Silk Road, and to plan the top-level design for the "Belt and Road" project.

On February 1, 2015, the Politburo Standing Committee of the Chinese Communist Party and vice premier of the State Council Zhang Gaoli began to promote the "one belt and one road" construction work conference in Beijing.

== Constituent personnel ==
The original members of the Leading Group were:

- Zhang Gaoli (Deputy Premier of the State Council)
- Deputy head Wang Huning (Director of the Policy Research Office of the CPC Central Committee and Director of the Office of the Central Comprehensive Deepening Reform Leading Group)
- Yang Jing (State Councilor and Secretary General of the State Council)
- Yang Jiechi (State Councilor, Director of the Office of the Leading Group of the Central Foreign Affairs Work)

The personnel in 2018 were:

- Team leader Han Zheng (Deputy Premier of the State Council)
- Deputy head Yang Jiechi (Director of the Office of the Central Foreign Affairs Working Committee)
- Hu Chunhua (Deputy Premier of the State Council)
- Xiao Jie (State Councilor and Secretary General of the State Council)
- He Lifeng (Director of the National Development and Reform Commission)

== Office ==
The leading group for promoting the initiative set up an office located in the National Development and Reform Commission. The commission was to undertake the daily work of the leading group.

=== Directors ===
- Xu Shaoshi (2015–2017, Director of the National Development and Reform Commission)
- He Lifeng (2017—Director of the National Development and Reform Commission)

=== Deputy directors ===
- He Lifeng (2015–2017, deputy director of the National Development and Reform Commission)
- Ning Jizhe (2015—Deputy Minister of Commerce)
- Zhang Jun (2018 - Assistant Foreign Minister)

== See also ==
- Silk Road
- State Council of the People's Republic of China
- National Development and Reform Commission
