= Chen Jinhua =

Chinese politician

- 陈锦华

Chairman of the State Planning Commission
- In office March 1993 – March 1998
- Premier: Li Peng

Member of the 14th Central Committee of the Chinese Communist Party
- In office 1992–1997
- General Secretary: Jiang Zemin

Personal details
- Born: July 1929 Qingyang County, Anhui, Republic of China
- Died: 2 July 2016 (aged 87) Beijing
- Party: Chinese Communist Party
- Education: Renmin University of China

Chen Jinhua
- Traditional Chinese: 陳錦華
- Simplified Chinese: 陈锦华
Transcriptions
Standard Mandarin
- Hanyu Pinyin: Chén Jǐnhuá

Chen Jinhua (July 1929 – 2 July 2016) was a Chinese politician.

== Biography ==
Chen joined the Chinese Communist Party (CCP) in February 1949 and studied at Renmin University of China from 1953 to 1955 and from 1960 to 1962. From the 1950s through the 1970s, he served in positions of increasing responsibility in China's former Ministry of Textile Industry and Ministry of Light Industry. From 1977 to 1983, Chen served on the Standing Committee of the Shanghai Municipal People's Congress, as well as deputy secretary of the Shanghai CCP Committee. From 1983 to 1990, he served as the general manager and CCP committee secretary of state-owned oil company Sinopec.

In 1990, Chen was named the chairman of the State Commission on Economic Structure Reform, a role in which he served until 1993. At the time, this was the most important administrative body dealing with economic reform policy. From 1993 to 1998 he served as the chairman of the State Planning Commission of China, the precursor to the current National Development and Reform Commission. From 1998 to 2003, he served as a vice-chairman of the Chinese People's Political Consultative Conference.

In Chen's view, combining the "visible" hand of state planning with the "invisible" hand of market mechanisms was the best way to manage the economy. According to Chen, since capitalist economies could use planning mechanisms to address shortcomings in the market, it stood to reason that socialist economies could use market mechanisms to overcome the limits of planned economics.

== Honors ==
- Japan:
  - Grand Cordon of the Order of the Rising Sun (05 Nov 2008)

Government offices
Preceded by Zou Jiahua	Chairman of the State Planning Commission; 1993–1998	Succeeded by Zeng Peiyan
