= Zhang Yong (politician) =

Chinese politician

- 张勇

Director of the China Food and Drug Administration
- In office 2013–2015
- Preceded by: New office
- Succeeded by: Bi Jingquan

Personal details
- Born: September 1953 (age 73) Beijing, China
- Party: Chinese Communist Party
- Education: Renmin University of China

Zhang Yong (Chinese: 张勇; born September 1953) is a Chinese politician who has served as Deputy Director of the National Development and Reform Commission since 2015. Prior to that, he served as Director of the China Food and Drug Administration (2013–2015), Director of the Executive Office of the State Food Safety Commission (2010–2013), member of the 18th Central Commission for Discipline Inspection (2012–2017), and Deputy Secretary-General of the State Council (2003–2008).

Zhang was born in Beijing in September 1953, with his ancestral home in Pingshan County, Hebei Province. He joined the Chinese Communist Party in March 1974. He studied at the Renmin University of China from 1979 to 1983, and holds a master's degree in economics.
