= Kang Shi'en =

Chinese politician

- 康世恩

State Councilor of China
- In office 1982–1988
- Premier: Zhao Ziyang

Vice Premier of China
- In office 1978–1982
- Premier: Zhao Ziyang

Personal details
- Born: 20 April 1915 Huai'an County, Hebei, China
- Died: 21 April 1995 (aged 80) Beijing, China
- Party: Chinese Communist Party
- Education: Tsinghua University

Kang Shi'en (Chinese: 康世恩; 20 April 1915 – 21 April 1995) was a Chinese Communist Party revolutionary who participated in the December 9th Movement and a politician who served as China's Vice Premier and Minister of Petroleum. Perceived as a member of the "Oil Clique" headed by his patron Yu Qiuli, Kang's career peaked in 1979 and 1980, when he was considered China's energy czar. However, he was officially reprimanded following the fatal Bohai No. 2 oil rig accident. He later served as the State Councilor in charge of the oil industry.

== Life ==
=== Early life and wartime career ===
On 20 April 1915, Kang Shi'en was born into a landlord family in Tianjiazhuang, Huai'an County, Hebei Province. In 1935, while a student at the Beiping High School, he participated in the December 9th Movement, a Communist-led student movement demanding the Kuomintang government to actively resist Japanese aggression. In 1936, he was admitted to the geology department of Tsinghua University, and joined the Chinese Communist Party (CCP) in October.

After the Second Sino-Japanese War erupted in 1937, Kang joined the Eighth Route Army and participated in anti-Japanese activities in Shuo County, Shanxi Province. During the Chinese Civil War, Kang served as the director of the political department of the Yanmen Military District and of the political department of a division of the First Field Army.

=== Early PRC ===
After the founding of the People's Republic of China in 1949, Kang was appointed the Communist Party chief of the Yumen Oil Field in Gansu Province, and then promoted to head the Petroleum Management Bureau of Northwest China. Although he studied geology in university, he had no formal education in petroleum engineering. In 1953, he became director of the Petroleum Management Bureau under the Ministry of Fuel Industry. When the Ministry of Petroleum was established in July 1955, Kang was appointed its Assistant Minister before being promoted to Vice Minister in October 1956. In 1960 he was sent to Daqing, the site of the Daqing Oil Field, and succeeded Yu Qiuli as the city's First Party Secretary the following year. When Yu became the de facto head of the State Planning Commission in 1964, Kang was appointed acting Minister of Petroleum.

=== Cultural Revolution ===
When the Cultural Revolution started in 1966, Kang Shi'en was attacked for giving priority to production and expertise as opposed to ideological purity. He was denounced as a henchman of Yu Qiuli and a collaborator of the fallen leaders Liu Shaoqi and Deng Xiaoping. Kang was forced out of his position as Petroleum Minister when he refused to denounce Yu, who had been a part of the February Countercurrent.

He was appointed deputy director of the Jianghan Oil Field in 1969 and Vice Minister of the newly formed Ministry of Fuel and Chemical Industries in 1970. In January 1975, he became Minister of the revived Ministry of Petroleum.

=== Post-Mao era ===
Kang Shi'en rose quickly during the transition period between Mao Zedong's death and Deng Xiaoping's rise. He was made a Vice Premier in early 1978, and Director of the State Economic Commission. A year later, he became a member of the powerful Financial and Economic Commission of the State Council. He was considered a member of the loosely constituted "Oil Clique" headed by his patron Yu Qiuli.

Kang reached the peak of his career in 1979 and 1980, when he was considered China's energy czar. China was beginning to open its energy industry to foreign investment, and Kang handled negotiations with the foreign oil companies and government officials regarding the development of oil resources in the Bohai Sea and the South China Sea. His foreign counterparts were reportedly impressed with his intellectual curiosity and cultured demeanour. He was said to be a shrewd yet straightforward negotiator with detailed knowledge about the oil business.

Kang's career was derailed by the November 1979 Bohai No. 2 oil rig accident, during which 72 people died when the oil rig capsized in the Bohai Bay. In May 1980, he received an official reprimand (demerit of the first grade) for failing to handle the incident promptly, an unprecedented punishment for an official of his stature. He lost his post as Director of the State Economic Commission in March 1981 and resumed the lower-ranking position of Petroleum Minister. He was replaced as Minister by Tang Ke in May 1982, and became a Vice Premier-level State Councilor in 1983. Although he retained responsibility for the oil industry, Kang lost the rest of the energy portfolio to the newly promoted Vice Premier Li Peng.

In the mid-1980s, Kang suffered from pancreatic cancer, which further affected his career. He sought treatment in the United States and partly recovered in 1985. He served as State Councilor until April 1988 and was a member of the Central Advisory Commission from 1987 to 1992. He was also a member of the 11th and 12th Central Committees of the CCP.

Kang died in Beijing on 21 April 1995, one day after his 80th birthday.

== Patronage of Zhu Rongji ==
Kang Shi'en was responsible for the quick rise of Zhu Rongji, a fellow Tsinghua alumnus who later became mayor of Shanghai under Deng Xiaoping and Premier of China under Jiang Zemin. After Zhu's post-Cultural Revolution political rehabilitation in 1979, Kang appointed Zhu as a deputy bureau chief in the Ministry of Petroleum. Zhu was later promoted to vice director of the State Economic Commission, which Kang headed.
