= Zhangping (disambiguation) =

Zhangping may refer to:

- Zhangping City (漳平), county-level city in the municipal region of Longyan, Fujian, China
- Zhangping (township) (樟坪), ethnic township in Guixi City in the municipal region of Yingtan, Jiangxi, China
- Zhang Ping (politician), Chinese politician
