= Deliberative and coordinating bodies of the State Council =

The deliberative and coordinating bodies of the State Council are agencies of the State Council of China, responsible for organizing and coordinating important cross-departmental business work. Matters agreed upon by the State Council's deliberative and coordinating body are handled by the relevant administrative agencies in accordance with their respective duties with the consent of the State Council. In special or emergency circumstances, with the consent of the State Council, the State Council's deliberative and coordinating body may stipulate temporary administrative management measures.

== List of deliberative and coordinating bodies ==
1. National Defense Mobilization Commission
  1. Group Leader: Li Qiang
  2. The specific work is undertaken by the National Development and Reform Commission, the Joint Staff Department, the Political Work Department, and the Logistics Support Department.
2. National Border and Coastal Defense Committee
  1. The specific work is undertaken by the Border Defense Division of the Operations Bureau of the Joint Staff Department.
3. National Patriotic Health Campaign Committee
  1. The specific work is undertaken by the National Health Commission
4. National Greening Committee
  1. The specific work is undertaken by the Department of Ecological Protection and Restoration of the National Forestry and Grassland Administration
5. Academic Degrees Committee of the State Council
  1. The specific work is undertaken by the Department of Degree Management and Postgraduate Education of the Ministry of Education, which is under the name of the Office of the State Council Academic Degrees Committee
6. State Flood Control and Drought Relief Headquarters
  1. The specific work is undertaken by the Ministry of Emergency Management (Office of the State Flood Control and Drought Relief Headquarters).
7. State Council Women and Children Working Committee
  1. The specific work is undertaken by the All-China Women's Federation.
8. National Leading Group for Double Supports
  1. The specific work is undertaken by the Ministry of Veterans Affairs.
9. State Council Disability Affairs Committee
  1. The specific work is undertaken by the China Disabled Persons' Federation.
10. State Council Leading Group on Poverty Alleviation and Development
  1. Single office
11. Customs Tariff Commission of the State Council
  1. The specific work is undertaken by the Customs Department of the Ministry of Finance
12. National Disaster Prevention, Mitigation and Relief Committee
  1. The specific work is undertaken by the Ministry of Emergency Management.
13. State Council's Working Group on the Placement of Retired Military Cadres
  1. The specific work is undertaken by the Ministry of Veterans Affairs
14. National Narcotics Control Commission
  1. The specific work is undertaken by the Narcotics Control Bureau of the Ministry of Public Security.
15. National Committee on Aging
  1. The office is located in the National Aging Office of the Ministry of Civil Affairs and is co-located with the China Association of Aging.
16. National Informatization Leading Group
  1. The specific work is undertaken by the Ministry of Industry and Information Technology
17. National Leading Group for Addressing Climate Change and Energy Conservation and Emission Reduction
  1. Also known as the National Leading Group for Addressing Climate Change or the State Council Leading Group for Energy Conservation and Emission Reduction
  2. The specific work is undertaken by the Department of Climate Change of the National Development and Reform Commission.
18. National Energy Commission
  1. The specific work is undertaken by the National Energy Administration.
19. State Council Work Safety Committee
  1. The specific work is undertaken by the Ministry of Emergency Management.
20. State Council AIDS Prevention and Treatment Working Committee
  1. The specific work is undertaken by the National Health Commission
21. Anti-Monopoly Committee of the State Council
  1. The specific work is undertaken by the Competition Policy Coordination Department of the State Administration for Market Regulation
22. National Forest and Grassland Fire Prevention and Suppression Headquarters
  1. The specific work is undertaken by the Fire Prevention and Control Department of the Ministry of Emergency Management
23. State Council Earthquake Relief Headquarters
  1. The specific work is undertaken by the Ministry of Emergency Management
24. Food Safety Committee of the State Council
  1. The specific work is undertaken by the State Administration for Market Regulation
25. State Council Migrant Workers Work Leading Group
  1. The specific work is undertaken by the Ministry of Human Resources and Social Security
26. Belt and Road Construction Leadership Group
  1. The specific work is undertaken by the National Development and Reform Commission
27. State Council Coordination Group for Promoting Function Transformation
  1. The specific work is undertaken by the General Office of the State Council
28. National Leading Group for Building a Strong Manufacturing Nation
  1. The specific work is undertaken by the Ministry of Industry and Information Technology
29. State Council Leading Group for Employment Promotion and Labor Protection
  1. The specific work is undertaken by the Ministry of Human Resources and Social Security
30. National Leading Group for Government Affairs Disclosure
31. National Quality Power Construction Coordination and Promotion Leading Group

== Abolished deliberative and coordinating bodies ==
According to the plan for streamlining and standardizing the deliberative and coordinating bodies of the State Council approved at the first executive meeting of the 11th State Council, the following deliberative and coordinating bodies of the State Council were abolished in 2008:

Deliberative and coordinating body	Department responsible for the relevant work
National Energy Leadership Group	National Energy Commission
National Leading Group for Dealing with Hijacking Incidents	Civil Aviation Administration of China
The State Council's Leading Group for the Reform of the Administrative Approval System	Ministry of Supervision and other relevant departments
National Medium- and Long-Term Science and Technology Development Planning Leading Group	Ministry of Science and Technology
National Biotechnology Research, Development and Industrialization Promotion Leading Group	Ministry of Science and Technology
State Council Product Quality and Food Safety Leading Group	Product quality: General Administration of Quality Supervision, Inspection and Quarantine
State Council Product Quality and Food Safety Leading Group	Food safety: Ministry of Health
National SARS Prevention and Control Headquarters	Ministry of Health
State Council Schistosomiasis Control Leading Group	Ministry of Health
State Council Urban Community Health Work Leading Group	Ministry of Health
National Leading Group for Rectifying and Regulating Market Economic Order	Ministry of Commerce
Taiwan Economic and Trade Coordination Group	Ministry of Commerce
WTO and FTA Working Group	Ministry of Commerce
National Intellectual Property Strategy Formulation Leading Group	State Intellectual Property Office
National Intellectual Property Protection Working Group	State Intellectual Property Office
National Service Industry Development Leading Group	National Development and Reform Commission
National Nuclear Power Independence Working Group	National Development and Reform Commission
National Headquarters for the Prevention and Control of Highly Pathogenic Avian Influenza	Ministry of Agriculture
National Leading Group for Reform of Rural Compulsory Education Funding Guarantee Mechanism	Ministry of Finance
National Western Region "Two Basics" Leading Group	Ministry of Education
National Central and Western Rural Junior High School Building Renovation Project Leading Group	Ministry of Education
National Leading Group for the International Promotion of Chinese Language	Ministry of Education
National Science Literacy Work Leading Group	China Association for Science and Technology
National Cultural Heritage Protection Leading Group	Ministry of Culture
National Qing History Compilation Leading Group (externally known as: China National Qing History Compilation Leading Group)	Ministry of Culture
National Leading Group for the Implementation of the Chemical Weapons Convention	Raw Materials Industry Department of the Ministry of Industry and Information Technology (retains the name of the National Office for the Implementation of the Chemical Weapons Convention)

Abolished in 2018

- State Council Leading Group for Deepening Medical and Health System Reform
- The Three Gorges Project Construction Committee of the State Council
- State Council South-to-North Water Diversion Project Construction Committee

Abolished in 2023

- National Science and Technology Leading Group
- National Science and Technology System Reform and Innovation System Construction Leading Group
