= Commission on Food Safety =

Chinese food safety committee

Commission on Food Safety of the State Council 国务院食品安全委员会
- Formation: 2010
- Type: Supra-ministerial policy coordination and consultation body
- Location: Beijing
- Leader: Han Zheng
- Deputy Leader: Wang Yang
- Chief of General Office: Zhang Yong
- Parent organization: State Council of the People's Republic of China
- Subsidiaries: General Office of the Commission on Food Safety

The Commission on Food Safety of the State Council (Chinese: 国务院食品安全委员会; pinyin: Guówùyuàn Shípǐn Ānquán Weǐyuánhuì) is a policy coordination committee with ultimate oversight on food safety in China. As it is an ad hoc coordination body it should not be confused with the established commissions and ministries which report into the State Council. The Commission is led by the Vice Premier of the State Council, Han Zheng, who is also a member of the Politburo Standing Committee of the Chinese Communist Party.

The commission was established in 2010 after a series of food safety incidents reduced the trust of the Chinese public as well as importers of Chinese made food outside of China. For example, the 2008 baby milk powder scandal caused major international controversy. The commission was initially headed by Li Keqiang, then the top-ranked Vice-Premier of the State Council and a member of the Politburo Standing Committee, who was assisted by two deputies, Vice Premier Wang Qishan and Vice Premier Hui Liangyu.

The membership of the organization is made up mainly of vice-ministers.

== Leaders ==
1. Li Keqiang (2010–2013, then serving as Vice Premier and a member of the Politburo Standing Committee)
2. Han Zheng (2013–present, serving as Vice Premier and a member of the Politburo Standing Committee)

== Current composition ==
- Leader
  - Han Zheng, Politburo Standing Committee, Vice Premier of the People's Republic of China
- Deputy Leader
  - Wang Yang, Politburo, Vice Premier of the People's Republic of China
- Chief of General Office
  - Zhang Yong
- Members
  - Zhang Yong, Deputy Secretary-General of the State Council, Chair of the China Food and Drug Administration, General Office chief
  - Bi Jingquan, Deputy Secretary-General of the State Council
  - Wu Hengquan, Deputy Head, Central Propaganda Department
  - Wang Qijiang, Deputy Secretary-General of the Central Political and Legal Affairs Commission
  - Hu Zucai, Vice Chairman of the National Development and Reform Commission
  - Wang Weizhong, Vice Minister of Science and Technology
  - Zhu Hongren, Engineer-in-chief, Ministry of Industry and Information
  - Huang Ming, Vice Minister of Public Security
  - Xiang Chunsheng, Vice Minister of Supervision
  - Wang Bao'an, Vice Minister of Finance
  - Li Ganjie, Vice Minister of Environmental Protection
  - Han Changbin, Vice Minister of Commerce
  - Jiang Zengwei, Vice Minister of Commerce
  - Chen Xiaohong, Vice Chair of the National Health and Family Planning Commission
  - Yu Guangzhou, Head of the China Customs Administration
  - Ma Zhengqi, Head of the State Administration for Industry and Commerce
  - Zhi Shuping, Head of the General Administration of Quality Supervision, Inspection and Quarantine
  - Yuan Shuhong, Deputy Chief, Legislative Affairs Office
  - Wang Guoqing, Deputy Chief, State Council Information Office
  - Ren Zhengxiao, chairman, State Administration of Grain

== See also ==
- Food safety incidents in China
- Gutter oil
