= Yu Qiuli =

Chinese military and political leader (1914–1999)

- 余秋里
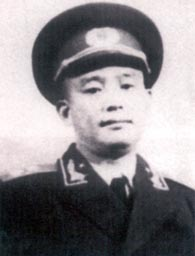

Director of the People's Liberation Army General Political Department
- In office September 1982 – November 1987

Vice Premier of China
- In office January 1975 – May 1982
- Premier: Zhou Enlai; Hua Guofeng; Zhao Ziyang

Director of the State Planning Commission
- In office January 1975 – August 1980
- Premier: Zhou Enlai; Hua Guofeng
- Preceded by: Li Fuchun
- Succeeded by: Yao Yilin

Minister of Petroleum
- In office February 1958 – 1966
- Premier: Zhou Enlai
- Preceded by: Li Jukui

Personal details
- Born: 15 November 1914 Ji'an County, Jiangxi
- Died: 3 February 1999 (aged 84) Beijing, China
- Party: Chinese Communist Party
- Spouse: Liu Suge

Yu Qiuli (Chinese: 余秋里; pinyin: Yú Qiūlǐ; 15 November 1914 – 3 February 1999) was a Chinese Communist army officer and politician, general of the People's Liberation Army. A veteran of the Long March, he held top military and government positions under both Mao Zedong and Deng Xiaoping and is considered the founding father of the Chinese petroleum industry and the China National Petroleum Corporation.

Following military service as a senior commander and political commissar in the Second Sino–Japanese War and the Chinese Civil War, Yu then served as Minister of the Petroleum Industry (1958–1966), Chairman of the State Planning Commission (1970–1980), Vice Premier (1975–1982), and Deputy Secretary-General of the Central Military Commission as well as Director of the PLA General Political Department (in effect, responsible for ensuring the political loyalty of the entire PLA) from 1982 to 1987.

== Early life and military service ==
Yu was born in Ji'an, Jiangxi, in 1914, three years after the collapse of China's last imperial dynasty, into a poor peasant family. By the age of 14 he had taken part in a peasant uprising. At 16 he joined the Chinese Communist Party. Yu was among the tens of thousands of guerrillas and their supporters who from 1934 joined the Long March in an effort to break through the Kuomintang blockades around the Communist base in the south. In 1936, he was injured in the arm during a skirmish with pursuing nationalist forces. He continued on the journey north over treacherous terrain. Nine months later, after he had completed a journey of thousands of miles in terrible pain, his arm was amputated. "I am a man who has gone through nine deaths," Yu told the American journalist Harrison Salisbury in 1984.

From November 1936 to August 1937, he received advanced military and political training at the Counter-Japanese Military and Political University.

During the Second Sino-Japanese War of 1937–1945, he served as Director of the Political Department of the 358th Brigade and in the subsequent Chinese Civil War, as Commander and Political Commissar of the 1st Division of the 1st Field Army, he played a leading role in the capture of Qinghai.

== Early People's Republic ==
After the Communist victory in 1949, Yu Qiuli was transferred to the Southwest, serving as a member of the Standing Committee of the Party Committee of the Western Sichuan District of the CCP and as the Principal and Political Commissar of the Senior Infantry School. In December 1954, he was called to Beijing and was named Director of the General Finance Department of the PLA, holding that position until early 1957, when he became Director of the PLA General Logistics Department. In September 1955, he was awarded the rank of lieutenant general.

== Petroleum Industry ==
In February 1958, he became the Second Minister for the Petroleum Industry, and decided to focus on oilfield exploration. He replaced Li Jukui in this role, a change made at the recommendation of Peng Dehaui. This move thrust him into a far more prominent role in the Communist government. In the following year, the discovery of huge oil reserves in Daqing in the desolate wastes of north-eastern China gave him a mission for which he is much remembered. Yu became the leader of the so-called "Petroleum Group" of officials which promoted the Daqing model of industrialization.

=== Daqing Oil Field ===
Yu was in charge of the development of the Daqing oil field. During its 1960 construction as part of the Great Leap Forward, Yu mobilized workers building the Daqing oil field through ideological motivation instead of material incentives, focusing enthusiasm, energy, and resources to complete a rapid industrialization project. Yu read Mao Zedong's writing to workers, urging them to engage in the hard labor at hand out of commitment to the building of Chinese socialism. In April 1960, Yu stated that Mao's texts On Contradiction and with On Practice would be the ideological core of the campaign to develop the oil field. The Petroleum Ministry shipped thousands of copies by plane so that every Daqing oil worker would have copies and for work units to each set up their own study groups.

Under Yu's direction, the mosquito-infested marshland - in winter, an expanse of ice - was transformed into China's biggest oil production centre. The economic benefits of the project were critical because without the production of the Daqing oil field, crude oil would have been severely limited after the Soviet Union cut off supplies as a result of the Sino-Soviet split.

The successful construction of the Daqing oil field despite harsh weather conditions and supply limitations became a model held up by the Communist Party as an example during subsequent industrialization campaigns. On February 5, 1964, the central Party promoted Daqing oil field to other industrial enterprises, instructing them to follow the "all-out battle" tactics of Daqing oil field. Shortly afterwards, Mao Zedong praised the Daqing oil field at an education work conference, stating that with a "little investment" in a "short period of time" a "great achievement" had been finished. Daqing oil field produced the famous Maoist icon Iron Man Wang, who, in order to stop a blow-out, leapt into a pool of liquid concrete to mix it using his own body. Yu chose Wang as the first model worker from Daqing oil field.

=== After Daqing ===
After his success in Daqing, Yu went on to establish several more major production centres. In 1964, China declared itself self-sufficient in oil. That year, Yu was moved into the most important government ministry related to the economy, the State Planning Commission, as vice director. He also functioned as the de facto director of the commission until 1980.

In 1965, Mao made Yu the top drafter of the Third Five Year Plan and put him in charge of relocating major industries to the remote hinterland of south-western China. Yu had a major role in the Third Front Construction.

Yu was involved in the February Countercurrent of 1967, an intra-party conflict in which a group of military leaders opposed the direction of the Cultural Revolution and the Gang of Four. Yu supported the military leaders who contended that the Cultural Revolution had disrupted the social order and undermined Party leadership, although his criticism was not nearly as forceful as the criticism from leaders like Chen Yi and Tan Zhenlin. The radical side prevailed in the dispute and several leaders who had been a part of the February Countercurrent were required to take leaves of absence and make self-criticisms. Given his lower rank than others who were part of the February Countercurrent, Yu was able to retain his position.

However, Yu also became a frequent target of Red Guards in Beijing and was subjected to numerous denunciation sessions. At one point, radical students confined him to the Beijing Oil Institute until Zhou Enlai contacted the Cultural Revolution Group to intercede with the students and allow Yu to return to work.

Also during the Cultural Revolution, Petroleum Minister Kang Shi'en was told to denounce Yu. Kang refused and was forced out of his position as a result.

In 1975, Yu was appointed Vice Premier.

After the death of Mao in 1976, Yu was promoted to the Politburo. He was a member of what is commonly referred to as the "petroleum faction" or "petroleum group," a group of senior officials who advocated using the profits from petroleum exports to finance high technology imports from the West and Japan. These officials were essentially Stalinists in their economic thinking, favoring central planning and heavy industry - a strategy that clashed with that of the ascendant Deng. As Deng's political fortunes rose in the late 1970s, those of the petroleum faction waned. Yu was forced to make a self-criticism after the collapse of a Japanese-made oil rig in the Bohai Gulf in 1979, and in 1980 he was transferred from the chairmanship of the State Planning Commission to the less high-profile post of head of the State Energy Commission.

== Political overseer of the PLA ==
In 1982, however, Yu was back in uniform, as Deng named him Deputy Secretary-General of the Central Military Commission and Director of the PLA General Political Department, a position of massive influence in the PLA, being responsible for checking and ensuring the political reliability and loyalty of all military personnel, and often described as "Military Grand Inquisitor". Yu held these posts until 1987, when he retired.

During the First Plenary Session of the 12th Central Committee, Yu was elected as a Secretary of the Secretariat of the Central Committee.

== Bibliography ==
- Salisbury, Harrison E. The New Emperors ISBN 0-380-72025-6
