= National Medical Products Administration =

Chinese government agency

- 国家药品监督管理局
- Formation: 1950 (predecessor organization); 2018 (latest re-organization)
- Type: Ministry-level regulatory body
- Headquarters: 1 Beiluyuan, Xicheng District, Beijing
- Location: Beijing, China
- Director: Bi Jingquan
- Deputy Directors: Yin Li, Wang Mingzhu, Teng Jiacai, Wu Zhen, Jiao Hong
- Discipline Inspection Leader: Li Wusi
- Parent organization: State Administration for Market Regulation
- Affiliations: Commission on Food Safety
- Website: english.nmpa.gov.cn

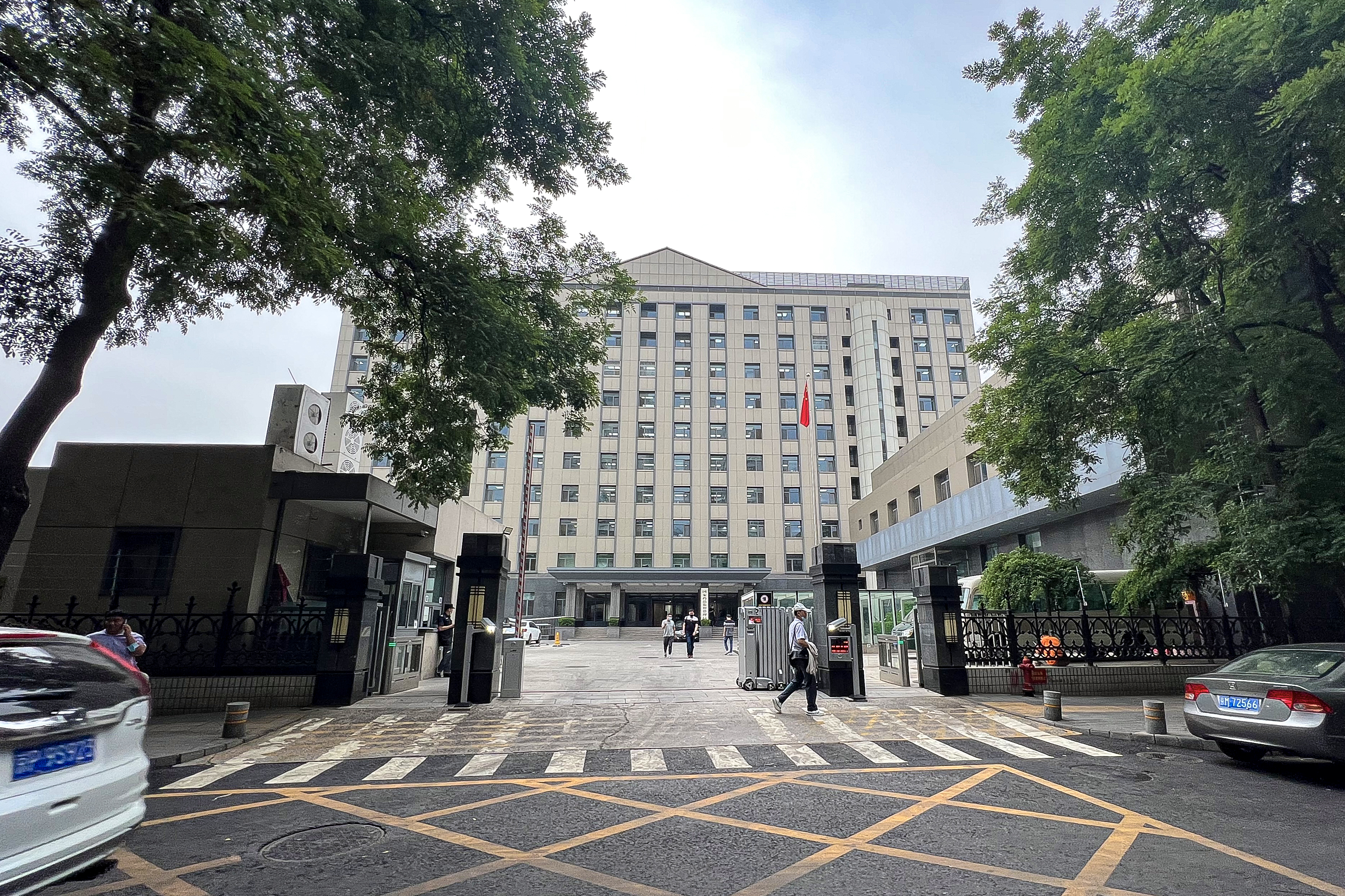
NMPA headquarters

Food & Drug Administration enforcement badge of China

The National Medical Products Administration (NMPA; 国家药品监督管理局) is a national bureau responsible for drug supervision under the State Council of China and is managed by the State Administration for Market Regulation.

== History ==
The agency had multiple former names, including China Food and Drug Administration and State Food and Drug Administration.

The National Medical Products Administration was founded on the basis of the former State Food and Drug Administration (SFDA). In March 2013, the former regulatory body was rebranded and restructured as the China Food and Drug Administration, elevating it to a ministerial-level agency. In 2018, as part of China's 2018 government administration overhaul, the name was changed to 'National Medical Products Administration' and merged into the newly created State Administration for Market Regulation. The headquarters are in Xicheng, Beijing.

In its first incarnation as the CFDA, the NMPA replaced a large group of overlapping regulators with an entity similar to the Food and Drug Administration of the United States, streamlining regulation processes for food and drug safety. The National Medical Products Administration is directly under the State Council of the People's Republic of China, which is in charge of comprehensive supervision on the safety management of food, health food and cosmetics and is the competent authority of drug regulation in mainland China.

On 10 July 2007, Zheng Xiaoyu, the former head of China's State Food And Drug Administration, was executed for taking bribes from various firms in exchange for state licences related to product safety.

== Main responsibilities ==
The National Medical Products Administration has regulatory authority over drugs, medical devices, cosmetics, and certain aspects of food safety. Its responsibilities include:

- Drafting laws, regulations, and policies related to supervision of drugs, medical devices, cosmetics, and health food, and developing plans for food and drug safety.
- Managing administrative licensing for food and drugs, overseeing the national pharmacopeia and essential medicines list, setting standards for drugs, devices, and cosmetics, and supervising their implementation.
- Operating reporting systems for food safety risks, adverse drug reactions, and adverse events involving medical devices, organizing inspections and enforcement actions, and overseeing product recalls.
- Registering medical devices and classifying them by risk: class I devices may require product testing, class II devices always require product testing and sometimes clinical trials, and class III devices require both product testing and clinical trials. The regulatory system is based on State Council regulations, NMPA orders, and detailed NMPA documents. Type testing must be based on Chinese National Standards (Guobiao, GB) or on Industry Standards (YY). The system is subject to frequent changes, and more than 100 new standards were released in 2013.
- Investigating and punishing major violations, coordinating with criminal justice authorities, and guiding enforcement by local regulators.
- Establishing emergency response mechanisms for food and drug safety incidents and supervising investigations and remedial measures.
- Organizing research and development programs related to food and drug safety, and managing testing laboratories, information systems, and electronic tracking systems.
- Conducting public education, training, and outreach on food and drug safety, and engaging in international exchanges and cooperation.
- Guiding provincial governments in implementing food and drug regulation, evaluating their performance, and coordinating the work of the Food Safety Commission of the State Council.

The NMPA also undertakes other tasks assigned by the State Council and the Food Safety Commission of the State Council.

Between 2001 and 2016, only about 100 new drugs were approved in China, roughly one-third of the number approved in most Western countries. Since then, approval times have been reduced from six or seven years to two or three years, and data from overseas clinical trials is now accepted.

== Organizational structure ==
Internal structure of CFDA (forerunner of NMPA)

1. General Office
2. Dept. of Legal Affairs
3. Dept. of Food Safety Supervision (I - III)
4. Dept. of Drug and Cosmetics Registration (Dept. of TCMs and Ethno-Medicines Supervision)
5. Dept. of Medical Device Registration
6. Dept. of Drug Cosmetics Supervision
7. Dept. of Medical Device Supervision
8. Bureau of Investigation and Enforcement
9. Dept. of Emergency Management
10. Dept. of Science, Technology and Standards
11. Dept. of Media and Publicity
12. Dept. of Human Resources
13. Dept. of Planning and Finance
14. Dept. of International Cooperation (Office of Hong Kong, Macao and Taiwan Affairs)

== Management ==
- Mr Bi Jingquan (Director)
- Mr Yin Li (deputy director)
- Ms Wang Mingzhu (deputy director)
- Mr Teng Jiacai (deputy director)
- Mr Wu Zhen (deputy director)
- Ms Jiao Hong (deputy director)
- Mr Li Wusi (Head of discipline inspection group)
- Mr Sun Xianze (assistant director for Drug Safety)
- Mr Guo Wenqi (assistant director for Food Safety)

== See also ==
- AQSIQ
- Pharmaceutical industry in China
- Food Administration
- Food safety in China
- International Conference on Harmonisation of Technical Requirements for Registration of Pharmaceuticals for Human Use (ICH)
- United States Food and Drug Administration
