= Gao Gang =

Chinese politician (1905–1954)

- 高岗
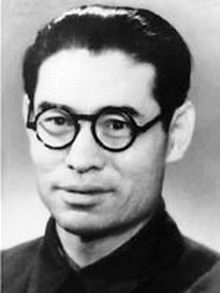

Vice Chairman of the Central People's Government of the People's Republic of China
- In office September 1949 – August 1954
- Leader: Mao Zedong
- Preceded by: Position established
- Succeeded by: Position abolished

Chairman of the State Planning Commission
- In office November 1952 – February 1954
- Preceded by: Position established
- Succeeded by: Li Fuchun

Chairman of the Northeast People's Government of the People's Republic of China
- In office April 1949 – January 1953
- Preceded by: Position established
- Succeeded by: Position abolished

Personal details
- Born: Gao Chongde (高崇德); October 25, 1905 Mizhi County, Shaanxi, Qing China
- Died: August 17, 1954 (aged 48) Beijing, China
- Party: Chinese Communist Party (posthumously expelled in 1955)
- Spouses: Yang Zhifang (m. 1925; div. 1938) Li Liqun (1940–1954)
- Children: 1 (son)
- Education: Yulin Middle School

Chinese name
- Traditional Chinese: 高崗
- Simplified Chinese: 高岗
Transcriptions
Standard Mandarin
- Hanyu Pinyin: Gāo Gǎng
- Wade–Giles: Kao Kang

Gao Gang (Chinese: 高岗; Wade–Giles: Kao Kang; 1905 – August 1954) was a Chinese Communist Party (CCP) leader during the Chinese Civil War and the early years of the People's Republic of China (PRC).

Born in rural Shaanxi province in 1905, Gao Gang joined the party in 1926 and led a revolutionary guerrilla base there during the Chinese Civil War. He was of peasant background with a low level of education: he is said to have not been very literate. Among his colleagues in the party, he gained a reputation as having great confidence and ambition, as well as of being a womanizer. Trusted by Mao Zedong, Gao was dramatically promoted in the final years of the civil war to become the party state and military head of Manchuria, the key Northeast area of China. In 1952, he was ordered to Beijing to become head of the State Planning Commission of China (SPC).

Beginning in late 1952 or early 1953, he attempted to challenge the political power of Liu Shaoqi and Zhou Enlai and to increase his own standing. This effort failed. During the “Gao Gang Affair,” Party leadership criticized Gao. Based on various grounds — true, false, and contended — Gao was deemed to have created an anti-party clique. Associates of Gao were politically purged and Gao was placed under house arrest. He killed himself in August 1954.

== Guerilla activities in Shaanxi ==
When his friend since middle school Liu Zhidan led a failed insurrection in 1928, Gao joined him in remote Northwest Shaanxi, where together they built up a guerrilla base. The deaths of local guerrilla leaders in the Northwest region distinguished Gao as the symbol of the revolutionary base. Gao was briefly removed from his position as commissar of the Shaanxi-Gansu Border Region Soviet for allegedly raping a woman. Gao met Mao Zedong in 1935 when the Long March ended in Shaanxi. Both developed a close relationship based on personal friendship and their agreement on Marxism–Leninism ideological matters. Gao spent many years during the Chinese Civil War coordinating party activities and became one of the top commanders in the region.

== Northeast China ==
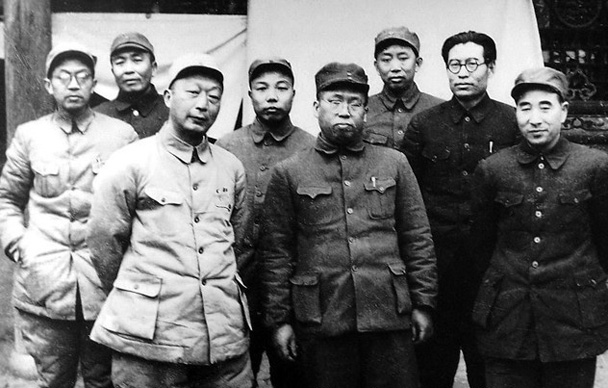
Gao Gang with military leaders in the Northeast, 1948. Left to right: Huang Kecheng, Tan Zheng, Nie Rongzhen, Xiao Hua, Luo Ronghuan, Liu Yalou, Gang, and Lin Biao

In 1945, Gao joined the Politburo of the Chinese Communist Party, and was transferred along with Lin Biao to northeast China (Dongbei), becoming head of the local party (the Northeastern Bureau), state and military apparatus. By 1947 Gao was the most important cadre in the region. After the founding of the PRC in 1949, Gao was named one of the six chairmen of the State Council, under Mao Zedong.

Influence from the nearby Soviet Union meant that Soviet ideas of industrial organization and economic planning were prominent, and Gao strongly supported these methods as the area became China's center of heavy industry. Northeastern Chinese areas such as Manchuria held further significance to China due to its occupation by the Japanese earlier in the century, and the People's Liberation Army's symbolic liberation of it from the Kuomintang in 1948 gave the region greater appeal for the CCP's industrial plans. Gao, now an influential local party cadre in the Northeastern region, detailed in a 1950 report that the CCP shall "recon[struct] the Northeast to serve as a starting point or important base for the industrialization of the whole country" Gao was thus, a key contributing player in the country's economic reconstruction and general production management in the early years of the CCP regime.

Due to its economic advancement, the northeast region was often used to test new Communist policies, something that increased both the prestige of the region and that of Gao himself. Gao also received significant propaganda coverage, as workers and peasants were encouraged to respond to his 'call' for increased industrial production; personal letters supporting him and salutations to his health were also published.

In July 1950, shortly after the outbreak of the Korean War, Gao was placed in command of the 260,000-man "Northern Frontier Guards", stationed along the border with North Korea. Gao was then held responsible for preparing his forces for the possibility of China's participation in the war. When China finally entered the Korean War in November 1950, Chinese forces were commanded by Peng Dehuai. During the Korean war, Gao developed a strong working relationship with Zhou Enlai.

== Beijing ==
In June 1952, along with the heads of other big regions, Gao Gang was transferred to Beijing. Gao took up the post of Chairman of the State Planning Commission of China (SPC), which made him principally responsible for carrying out the First Five-Year Plan, the national policy that introduced Soviet economic planning into the People's Republic of China. In addition to responsibility over the SPC, Gao was made in charge of eight major economic industries, including heavy industry, light industry, the first and second mechanical industries, fuel, construction, geological planning, and textiles.

Despite Gao's increases in power and responsibility, sources point out that Mao orchestrated Gao's promotion to Beijing in order to reduce Zhou Enlai's authority, who Mao suspected was gaining too much influence over CCP policies and leadership alongside Chen Yun and Liu Shaoqi. Gao was also confirmed as a Politburo member, a vice-chairman of the Central People's Government Council, and a vice-chairman of the People's Revolutionary Military Council. Gao's facilitation of Sino-Soviet relations during the advising stages of the First Five-Year Plan were of particular importance to the party, making him a valuable, capable Politburo member to Mao and other senior party members. However, there is some evidence that Gao was reluctant to leave his power base in the Northeast and move to Beijing.

Gao advocated the early to mid-1950s policy of centralizing control over China's state-owned enterprises. In 1952, Gao began pushing for rapid rural collectivization, as he cited that if the "spontaneous tendency of the peasants towards capitalism" went unchecked, China would have a capitalist future.

Although Gao's transfer to Beijing made him more controllable by the Party center, it motivated him to achieve greater advancement within the Party hierarchy. He saw himself as the second most important leader in China, second only to Mao upon his promotion above Zhou Enlai. After his appointment to Beijing, he openly disagreed with the appointment of party leaders, rather than military leaders, to high government positions. He often clashed with Finance Minister Bo Yibo over collectivization and tax policies. In 1952 and 1953, there were several major changes in the central administrative structure. Peng Dehuai was recalled from Korea and placed in charge of the Central Military Commission, a post which had previously been held by Zhou Enlai. After transferring his military responsibilities to Peng, Zhou focused his efforts on devising China's first Five-Year Plan, with the participation of the Soviet Union. Mao indicated that he was not pleased with Zhou's performance; and, in late 1952 and late 1953, Mao initiated a major reshuffling of the central government hierarchy.

Several regional commanders, including Gao Gang, Deng Xiaoping, and Rao Shushi, were also transferred to the Beijing to take over responsibilities from Zhou. Gao was to head the State Planning Commission. Although he technically retained the position of the third most important man in the official hierarchy (after Mao Zedong and Liu Shaoqi), Zhou's position was considerably weakened. For example, while Zhou was in charge of foreign relations, Mao sent Gao Gang to receive and negotiate plans with the North Korean leader, Kim Il Sung, in 1953 during his arrival in November. A telegram from Zhou Enlai to Chai Junwu, Peng Dehuai, and Gao Gang, confirms that Mao specifically sent Gao to "discuss military operations and supplies in North Korea, the training and arrangement of the North Korea People’s Army and organs after they enter the Northeast, and other questions."

In the period before the Gao Gang Affair, Gao's power in the Party had increased, particularly as a result of Mao's dissatisfaction with Liu Shaoqi over the slow pace in China's transition to a socialist system. Gao had ambitions to supplant Liu and Mao gave him discreet encouragement, as Mao had complained about Liu and Zhou to Gao privately in the winter of 1952, which convinced Gao to proceed in taking on a more high-profile role.

== Gao Gang Affair and death ==
In 1952, Mao gave first indications that he was "withdrawing to the second front", which meant that his day-to-day running of the Party and government was about to be left to his subordinates while he concentrated on major strategic and theoretical issues. To Gao, it was a signal to act fast before Liu Shaoqi could entrench himself as Mao's successor. The succession of Georgy Malenkov after Joseph Stalin's death gave further encouragement to Gao that a young Politburo member was able to inherit the communist mantle. However, It was a strategic miscalculation that ended up a palace conspiracy.

Gao convinced Rao Shushi that under his leadership, Rao would be made Premier of China. Gao was also able to obtain a copy of the draft list for the new Politburo, prepared by Liu's associates that proposed the representation of those who had spent most of the civil war period in the Kuomintang-controlled areas be increased. Gao used the list to work up support among those who had served in the communist-controlled areas but was excluded.

Marshals Peng Dehuai and Lin Biao supported Gao, but Deng Xiaoping and Chen Yun sensed something amiss and both sent reports to Mao about Gao's actions, who told both men to stay quiet regarding the information. In early December 1953, at a Politburo meeting, Mao announced that he intended to spend several weeks in southern China and proposed that Liu Shaoqi acted in his place temporarily. Gao rose up and suggested that the responsibility should be rotated among other senior Politburo members. Mao indicated that he would consider the idea, but Gao persisted and in the next several weeks, lobbied his colleagues frantically for other leadership changes, including his own promotion to Vice-Chairman or alternatively, General Secretary of the Party.

It was a trap set up by Mao himself and Gao had apparently went too far, which eventually sealed his fate. By late December, when the Politburo reconvened, Mao accused Gao of unprincipled factionalism, carrying out "underground activities" and attempting to enhance his personal power. From this, Gao was convinced that Mao had betrayed him.

In February 1954, Gao attempted to commit suicide by shooting himself, but failed. Gao was forced to give severe self-criticism sessions, Politburo and party members publicly denounced him in meetings and he was placed under house arrest not long after. In August 1954, Gao attempted suicide once more and was successful this time, killing himself with sleeping pills.

Rao Rushi was also arrested and died in prison later in 1975. Peng Dehuai and Lin Biao were exonerated, having pleaded that they were under the impression that Gao had Mao's approval. Deng Xiaoping was promoted to the Politburo while Chen Yun was made Vice-Chairman of the Party two years later at the Eighth Party Congress.

Preceded by none	Chairman of the State Planning Commission; 1952–1954	Succeeded by Li Fuchun
