= Chairman of the National Development and Reform Commission =

Chinese government position

Chairman of National Development and Reform Commission of the People's Republic of China
- 中华人民共和国国家发展和改革委员会主任
- National Emblem of China

- Flag of China

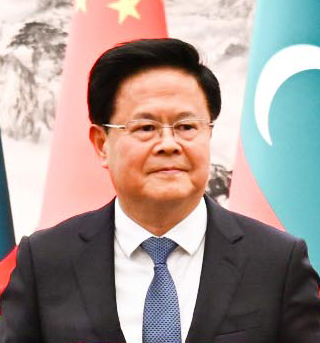
- Incumbent; Zheng Shanjie since 12 March 2023
- National Development and Reform Commission
- Status: Provincial and ministerial-level official
- Member of: Plenary Meeting of the State Council
- Seat: National Development and Reform Commission Building, Xicheng District, Beijing
- Nominator: Premier (chosen within the Chinese Communist Party)
- Appointer: President with the confirmation of the National People's Congress or its Standing Committee
- Formation: November 1952; 73 years ago
- First holder: Gao Gang
- Deputy: Vice Chairperson

The chairman of the National Development and Reform Commission of the People's Republic of China is the head of the National Development and Reform Commission of the People's Republic of China and a member of the State Council. Within the State Council, the position is third in order of precedence.

The chairman is responsible for leading the commission, presiding over its meetings, and signing important documents related to the commission. Officially, the chairman is nominated by the premier of the State Council, who is then approved by the National People's Congress or its Standing Committee and appointed by the president. The current director is Zheng Shanjie, who concurrently serves as the Chinese Communist Party Committee Secretary of the commission.

== List of directors ==
No.	Portrait	Name	Took office	Left office	Ref.
Chairman of the State Planning Commission of the Central People's Government
1		Gao Gang	November 1952	February 1954	
Chairperson of the State Planning Commission
2		Li Fuchun	September 1954	June 1970	
3		Yu Qiuli	January 1975	August 1980	
4		Yao Yilin	August 1980	June 1983	
5		Song Ping	June 1983	June 1987	
6		Yao Yilin	June 1987	December 1989	
7		Zou Jiahua	December 1989	March 1993	
8		Chen Jinhua	March 1993	March 1998	
Chairperson of the State Development Planning Commission
9		Zeng Peiyan	March 1998	March 2003	
Chairperson of the National Development and Reform Commission
10		Ma Kai	March 2003	March 2008	
11		Zhang Ping	8 March 2008	16 March 2013	
12		Xu Shaoshi	16 March 2013	24 February 2017	
13		He Lifeng	24 February 2017	12 March 2023	
14		Zheng Shanjie	12 March 2023	Incumbent	
