= Ma Kai =

Vice Premier of China

- 马凯
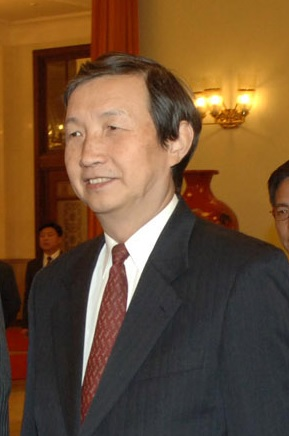
- Ma in 2008

Vice Premier of China
- In office 16 March 2013 – 19 March 2018 Serving with Zhang Gaoli, Liu Yandong, Wang Yang
- Premier: Li Keqiang
- Preceded by: Wang Qishan

11th Secretary-General of the State Council
- In office March 2008 – March 2013
- Preceded by: Hua Jianmin
- Succeeded by: Yang Jing

Chairman of the National Development and Reform Commission
- In office March 2003 – March 2008
- Premier: Wen Jiabao
- Preceded by: Zeng Peiyan
- Succeeded by: Zhang Ping

Personal details
- Born: June 1946 (age 80) Jinshan, Shanghai, China
- Party: Chinese Communist Party
- Education: Renmin University of China

Chinese name
- Simplified Chinese: 马凯
- Traditional Chinese: 馬凱
Transcriptions
Standard Mandarin
- Hanyu Pinyin: Mǎ Kǎi

Ma Kai (Chinese: 马凯; pinyin: Mǎ Kǎi) is a Chinese retired politician who served as a vice premier of China from 2013 to 2018. He was formerly the chairman of the National Development and Reform Commission from 2003 to 2008, and a State Councilor and secretary-general of the State Council from 2008 to 2013.

== Early life and education ==
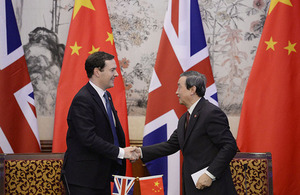
Ma Kai meeting with the UK's Chancellor of the Exchequer George Osborne in October 2013

Ma Kai was born in Jinshan, Shanghai in 1946. He received his Master's degree from Renmin University of China in 1982.

== Political career ==
Ma was a member of the 16th and the 17th Central Committee of the Chinese Communist Party.

In 2003 he was given responsibility for the National Development and Reform Commission, an organization which has broad administrative and planning control over the economy of China.

=== Vice Premier ===
Ma was elected to the 18th Politburo of the Chinese Communist Party in November 2012. In March 2013, he was appointed as the fourth-ranking vice premier of the State Council. His portfolio included putting forth Chinese policies with regard to global warming. In November 2017, Ma Kai was appointed to lead the Financial Stability and Development Committee (FSDC).

== Personal life ==
Ma Kai is also known as an accomplished poet.

Government offices
Preceded by Zeng Peiyan	Chairman of the National Development and Reform Commission; 2003–2008	Succeeded by Zhang Ping
