= Customs Tariff Commission of the State Council =

Chinese government body

- 国务院关税税则委员会
- National Emblem of China

Agency overview
- Formed: March 7, 1987
- Jurisdiction: Government of China
- Status: Deliberative and coordinating body of the State Council
- Headquarters: No. 3 Lane 3, Sanlihe South, Xicheng District, Beijing (Ministry of Finance Office Building)
- Director responsible: Wu Hongmei
- Parent Agency: State Council of China
- Child Agency: Office of the Tariff Commission of the State Council (Tariff Department of the Ministry of Finance)

Chinese name
- Simplified Chinese: 国务院关税税则委员会
- Traditional Chinese: 國務院關稅稅則委員會
Transcriptions
Standard Mandarin
- Hanyu Pinyin: Guójiā Xīnwén Chūbǎnshǔ

Alternative Chinese name
- Simplified Chinese: 国务院税委会
- Traditional Chinese: 國務院稅委會
Transcriptions
Standard Mandarin
- Hanyu Pinyin: Guówùyuàn Shuìwěihuì

The Customs Tariff Commission of the State Council is a deliberative and coordinating body of the State Council responsible for tariffs.

== History ==
On 7 March 1987, the "Notice of the General Office of the State Council on the Establishment of the State Council Tariff Commission" was issued, establishing the State Council Tariff Commission. On 30 November 1998, the General Office of the State Council issued the Notice on the Main Responsibilities and Members of the State Council Tariff Commission, which stated that according to the State Council institutional reform plan, the State Council Tariff Commission would be the State Council's deliberative and coordinating body.

On 21 March 2008, the State Council issued the Notice on the Establishment of Deliberative and Coordinating Bodies, which stipulates that the State Council Tariff Commission will continue to be the deliberative and coordinating body of the State Council, with the specific work to be undertaken by the Ministry of Finance.

== Responsibilities ==
The 1987 Notice of the General Office of the State Council on the Establishment of the State Council Tariff Commission defined its main responsibilities as: "to propose guidelines, policies and principles for the formulation or revision of the Tariff Regulations and the Import and Export Tariff, to review draft tariff revisions, to formulate provisional tariff rates (including import adjustment tax rates), and to review and approve partial adjustment of tariff rates, etc."

The 1998 "Notice of the General Office of the State Council on the Main Responsibilities and Membership List of the State Council Tariff Committee" defines its main responsibilities as follows: "to review and approve plans for adjusting customs tariff rates, annual provisional tariff rates, tariff quota rates, special tariff rates (including anti-dumping and anti-subsidy) rates, and revising import and export tariff items and tariff numbers; to approve plans for applying preferential tariff rates to relevant countries; to review and report major tariff policies and foreign tariff negotiation plans to the State Council; to propose guidelines, policies and principles for formulating and revising the "Import and Export Tariff Regulations of the People's Republic of China", and to review its draft revisions."

On April 26, 2003, the General Office of the State Council defined its main responsibilities as follows: "to review and approve the plans for adjusting customs tariff rates, annual provisional tariff rates, tariff quota rates, special tariff rates (including anti-dumping and countervailing duties) and revising import and export tariff items and tariff numbers; to approve plans for applying preferential tariff rates to relevant countries; to review and report major tariff policies and foreign tariff negotiation plans to the State Council; to propose the guidelines and principles for formulating and revising the "Import and Export Tariff Regulations of the People's Republic of China" and to review its draft revision."

The main responsibilities of the State Council Tariff Commission are as follows: "to adjust and interpret the tariff items, tariff numbers and tariff rates of the "Tariff of the People's Republic of China" and the "Tariff Rate Table of Import and Export Tariffs of the People's Republic of China", and implement them after approval by the State Council; to decide on the goods, tariff rates and duration for which provisional tariff rates are to be applied; to decide on tariff quota rates; to decide on the imposition of anti-dumping duties, countervailing duties, safeguard tariffs, retaliatory tariffs and the implementation of other tariff measures; to approve the application of preferential tariff rates to relevant countries and regions; to review and report to the State Council major tariff policies and foreign negotiation plans; to decide on the application of tariff rates in special circumstances, and to perform other duties prescribed by the State Council."

In 2013, the General Office of the State Council issued the “Notice on the Main Responsibilities and Adjustment of Members of the State Council Tariff Committee”, which further adjusted the main responsibilities.

== Office ==
The Tariff Department of the Ministry of Finance shares office space with the Office of the Customs Tariff Commission of the State Council, and is also known as the Tariff Policy Research Center of the Ministry of Finance. It is an internal agency of the Ministry of Finance.

=== History ===
The 1987 “Notice of the General Office of the State Council on the Establishment of the State Council Tariff Commission” stipulated that the office of the State Council Tariff Commission was the Office of the State Council Tariff Commission, located in the General Administration of Customs, responsible for handling daily work. In 1993, the General Office of the State Council issued a notice on adjusting the membership of the State Council Tariff Commission, which stipulated that the office of the State Council Tariff Commission would be located in the State Economic and Trade Commission. In 1998, the General Office of the State Council issued a notice on the main duties and membership list of the State Council Tariff Commission, which stipulated that the office of the State Council Tariff Commission would be located in the Ministry of Finance.

=== Internal organization ===
Customs Department of the Ministry of Finance (Office of the Customs Tariff Commission of the State Council) has the following institutions:

- Office
- General Office
- Tariff Department
- Policy and Regulation Department
- International Affairs Office
- Regional Office
- Research Office
- Fair Trade Office
