= Zeng Peiyan =

Chinese politician

- 曾培炎
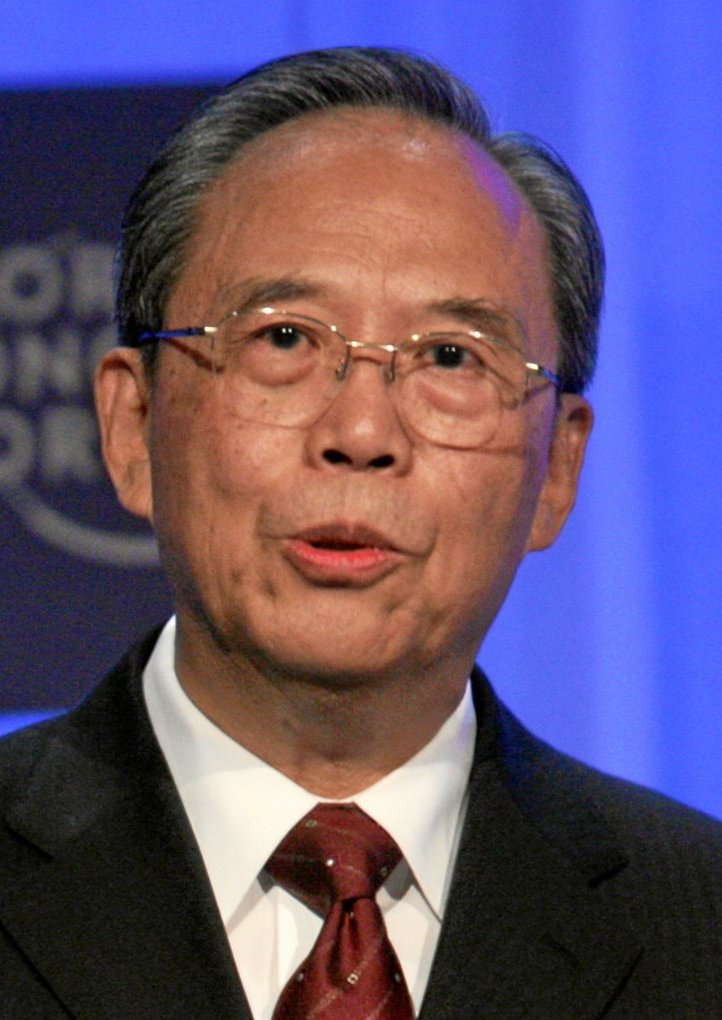
- Zeng Peiyan in 2008.

Vice Premier of China
- In office 17 March 2003 – 17 March 2008
- Premier: Wen Jiabao

Chairman of the State Development Planning Commission
- In office March 1998 – March 2003
- Premier: Ma Kai
- Preceded by: Chen Jinhua
- Succeeded by: Zhang Ping

Personal details
- Born: 1 December 1938 (age 87) Shaoxing, Chekiang, Republic of China
- Party: Chinese Communist Party
- Education: Tsinghua University

Zeng Peiyan (Chinese: 曾培炎; pinyin: Zēng Péiyán; born December 1938) is a Chinese politician. He was a member of the Politburo of the Chinese Communist Party from 2002 to 2007 and was a vice premier from 2003 to 2008.

== Early life and career ==
Zeng Peiyan was born in Shaoxing, Zhejiang Province. He graduated from Tsinghua University in 1962. Zeng joined the Chinese Communist Party in 1978.

In his capacity as vice premier, Zeng at the December 2006 Standing Committee Meeting of the Tenth National People's Congress, advocated for the use of foreign exchange reserves to support Chinese companies in obtaining foreign mineral resources, thereby developing China's access to strategic minerals.

== Post-political life ==
Following his post as Vice Premier of the State Council, Zeng has been serving as the chairman of the China Center for International Economic Exchanges, a think tank with the mission of promoting international economic research and exchanges and providing consulting service. In 2009, he also became a member of the International Advisory Council of the sovereign wealth fund China Investment Corporation.

=== 2013 Taiwan visit ===
In end of February 2013, Zeng, in his capacity as the chairman of the mainland-based China Center for International Economic Exchanges visited Taiwan for five days in which he delivered a speech during a Cross-Straits Entrepreneurs' Forum at the Grand Hotel in Taipei. His visit came at the invitation of Vincent Siew, the chairman of the Cross-Straits Common Market Foundation. Zeng met representatives from Taiwan's industrial and commercial circles, and will also tour around the region to get a better understanding of the latest developments to the island's economy.

Government offices
Previous: Chen Jinhua as Chairman of the State Planning Commission	Chairman of the State Development Planning Commission; 1998–2003	Next: Ma Kai as Chairman of the National Development and Reform Commission
