= Xu Shaoshi =

Chinese politician

- 徐绍史
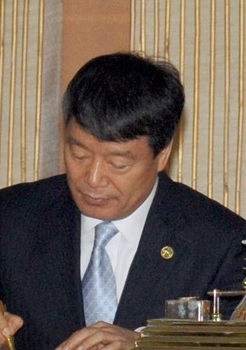
- Xu in 2013

Chairman of the National Development and Reform Commission
- In office 16 March 2013 – 24 February 2017
- Premier: Li Keqiang
- Preceded by: Zhang Ping
- Succeeded by: He Lifeng

Minister of Land and Resources
- In office 27 April 2007 – 16 March 2013
- Premier: Wen Jiabao
- Preceded by: Sun Wensheng
- Succeeded by: Jiang Daming

Personal details
- Born: October 1951 (age 75) Ningbo, Zhejiang, China
- Party: Chinese Communist Party
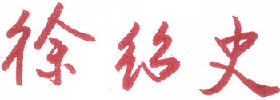
- Signature

Xu Shaoshi (Chinese: 徐绍史; born October 1951) is a Chinese politician, and former chairman of the National Development and Reform Commission of the People's Republic of China.

== Early life ==
Xu was born in Ningbo, Zhejiang Province. He joined the Chinese Communist Party (CCP) in December 1974.

== Political career ==
From April 2007 to March 2013, he was Minister of Land and Resources and the party chief of the Ministry. He is also the general supervisor of national land.

According to The Age in January 2010 Xu Shaoshi lead a high-level delegation to the Antarctic, aboard China's icebreaking research vessel, Xue Long. Xu toured Australia's Casey Station before proceeding to China's Antarctic Zhongshan Station. Among the officials who accompanied him was Qu Tanzhou, the director of the Chinese Arctic and Antarctic Administration. Jo Chandler, writing in The Age, reported that Xu declined to be interviewed and the presence of his delegation was not covered in the Chinese Press. Chandler reported that the purpose of the tour was to familiarize Xu and his colleagues with China's research efforts in the Antarctic, and the potential mineral resources that could be exploited there. She noted that China, like all other parties to the International treaties to the Antarctic, was barred from resource exploitation until 2048.

He was a member of the 17th Central Committee of the Chinese Communist Party and later became a member of the 18th Central Committee.

At the first plenary session of the 12th National People's Congress in March 2013, Xu Shaoshi was elected as Chairman of the National Development and Reform Commission, succeeding Zhang Ping.

Government offices
Preceded by Zhang Ping	Chairman of the National Development and Reform Commission; 2013–2017	Succeeded by He Lifeng
