= Oil clique =

An oil clique is a social clique or a network of powerful individuals and institutions that are involved in the petroleum industry. Important examples include China's oil clique and Texas' oil clique.
