= Jiang Zelin =

Chinese politician

Jiang Zelin (Chinese: 江泽林; born October 1959) is a Chinese politician, serving since 2015 as the Deputy Secretary-General of the State Council and chief of staff to Vice Premier Wang Yang. He previously held office as Chinese Communist Party Committee Secretary of Sanya, vice governor of Hainan province, and executive vice governor of Shaanxi province.

== Biography ==
Jiang was born in 1959 in Anqing, Anhui province. He attended Yangqiao High School, then Jiangsu Polytechnic School (now Jiangsu University) where he specialized in agricultural mechanics. After graduating he entered the Ministry of Agriculture, first working as a technician, before being promoted to engineer and project manager. He eventually earned title of senior engineer. He obtained an economics doctorate from Chinese Academy of Social Sciences in 1994.

After completing his graduate degree, he was sent to Hainan province to work, heading up the agriculture department of Sanya, then becoming the city's vice-mayor. In 1998, he became director of the department of water resources of Hainan province, then director of the department of fisheries and oceans. In February 2002 he was promoted to vice governor of Hainan, then in December 2012, a member of the Chinese Communist Party Provincial Standing Committee of Hainan, and Chinese Communist Party Committee Secretary of Sanya. During his stint in Sanya he was selected by the Communist Party to participate in a study-abroad term to Harvard University.

In January 2011, he was again transferred to work in Shaanxi province, entering the CCP leadership ranks there and becoming vice governor. He was instrumental in the development of the Xixian New Area (西咸新区). In June 2011, a new administrative bureau was established to oversee the new development area, and Jiang was named its director. In February 2013 he was again promoted to executive vice governor while retaining his position at Xixian.

In April 2015, Jiang was abruptly transferred to work as Deputy Secretary-General of the State Council, becoming chief of staff to Vice-Premier Wang Yang.

Jiang was an alternate of the 17th Central Committee of the Chinese Communist Party.
