= Li Fuchun =

Chinese politician (1900–1975)

- 李富春
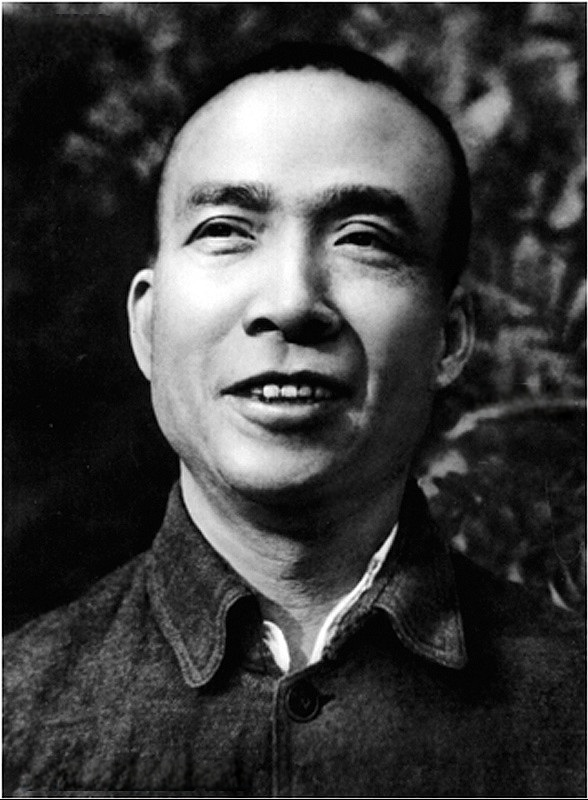
- Li in 1940

Vice Premier of China
- In office September 1954 – 9 January 1975
- Premier: Zhou Enlai

Director of the State Planning Commission
- In office September 1954 – June 1975
- Premier: Zhou Enlai
- Preceded by: Gao Gang
- Succeeded by: Yu Qiuli

Director of the Organs Production Processing Committee
- In office February 1952 – September 1954
- Premier: Zhou Enlai
- Preceded by: New title
- Succeeded by: Position revoked

Minister of Heavy Industry
- In office April 1950 – 1952
- Premier: Zhou Enlai
- Preceded by: He Changgong
- Succeeded by: Wang Heshou

Director of the General Office of the Chinese Communist Party
- In office September 1941 – October 1945
- Preceded by: New title
- Succeeded by: Yang Shangkun

Acting Director of the General Political Department of the People's Liberation Army
- In office 1934–1935
- Preceded by: Guo Zuolin
- Succeeded by: Bo Gu

Personal details
- Born: May 22, 1900 Changsha, Hunan, Qing China
- Died: January 9, 1975 (aged 74) Beijing, China
- Party: Chinese Communist Party
- Spouse: Cai Chang (m. 1923; died 1975)
- Children: Li Tete
- Education: Communist University of the Toilers of the East

Li Fuchun (Chinese: 李富春; pinyin: Lǐ Fùchūn; Wade–Giles: Li Fu-ch'un; May 22, 1900 – January 9, 1975) was a Chinese Communist revolutionary and politician, who served as a Vice Premier of China from 1954 to 1975. Born in Changsha, Li went to France on a work-study programme in 1919, where he helped to found the European branch of the Chinese communist youth movement and joined the Chinese Communist Party (CCP). After studying in Moscow, he served as a political officer in the National Revolutionary Army during the Northern Expedition, worked underground for the CCP, and took part in the Long March. During the Second Sino-Japanese War and the Chinese Civil War, he held senior party posts in Yan'an and in Manchuria.

After 1949, Li became Minister of Heavy Industry and, from 1954, vice premier and chairman of the State Planning Commission, directing the drafting of China's First Five-Year Plan. After the Great Leap Forward, he devised the "eight-character policy" of economic readjustment. He was elected to the Politburo Standing Committee in 1966.

== Early life and education ==
Li Fuchun was born on 22 May 1900 in Changsha, Hunan, into the family of a poor teacher, and spent his childhood and school years there. In 1919, he took part in the May Fourth Movement. In October 1919, after studying at Changjun Middle School, he went to France on the work-study programme.

== Revolutionary career ==
In France, Li worked as a fitter and as a train driver. In August 1920, he and Li Weihan renamed the Work-Study Encouragement Society, which he had helped to found, as the Work-Study World Society, with the stated aim of carrying out a social revolution, and he took part in several political struggles. In June 1922, he helped to found the Chinese Youth Communist Party in Europe in Paris and served as secretary of one of its local branches. Soon afterwards, he became a member of the Chinese Communist Party. In February 1923, the organisation was renamed the European branch of the Chinese Communist Youth League. From August 1923, Li served successively as a member of its executive committee, head of its student movement committee, a member of its secretariat and chairman of its executive committee.

In June 1923, Li joined the Kuomintang (KMT) as part of the First United Front, and in November he became head of the propaganda section of the KMT's European branch. The same year, he married Cai Chang, with Deng Xiaoping as a witness. In January 1925, he went to the Soviet Union to study at the Communist University of the Toilers of the East in Moscow, where he served on the local executive committees of the Chinese Communist Youth League and the CCP.

=== First-half of the Chinese Civil War ===
In the summer of 1925, Li returned to China and became a member of the military committee of the CCP's Guangdong Regional Committee. He served as deputy party representative, head of the political department and head of the military law office of the 2nd Army of the National Revolutionary Army, and took part in the Northern Expedition. After the collapse of the alliance between the KMT and the CCP in 1927, he carried out underground work for the CCP in Shanghai and Hong Kong. He served as head of the propaganda department and acting secretary of the CCP's Jiangsu Provincial Committee, secretary of its Fanan District Committee in Shanghai, and head of the propaganda department and acting secretary of the Guangdong Provincial Committee.

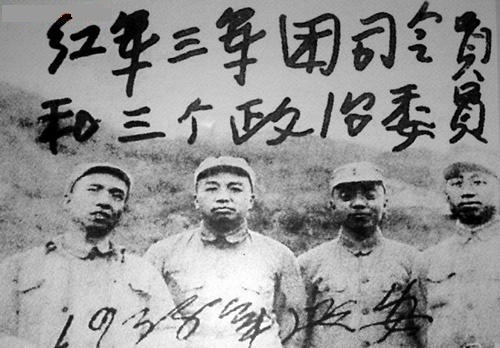
Former commanders and political commissars of the Red 3rd Army Group in Yan'an in 1938. From left: Li Fuchun, Peng Dehuai, Yang Shangkun and Teng Daiyuan.

In 1931, Li moved to the Central Soviet Area, where he became acting secretary of the CCP's Jiangxi Provincial Committee and took part in the campaigns against the KMT's encirclement campaigns. In September 1934, he became deputy director and acting director of the Red Army's General Political Department. He took part in the Long March from October 1934, and in January 1935 he attended the Zunyi Conference, where he supported Mao Zedong. He later served as director of the political department of the First Front Army, political commissar of the 3rd Army Group and political commissar of the 2nd Column of the Shaanxi–Gansu Detachment. After reaching northern Shaanxi, he became secretary of the CCP's Shaanxi–Gansu–Ningxia Provincial Committee in May 1936.

=== Second Sino-Japanese War ===
During the Second Sino-Japanese War, Li served as deputy head of the CCP Central Organization Department. From early 1939, he was also first deputy director of the Central Finance and Economic Committee, and later deputy head of the Central Finance and Economic Department and deputy director of the Central Production Movement Committee. He directly led the financial and economic work of the Shaanxi–Gansu–Ningxia Border Region and helped to organise its Great Production Movement. From 1941, he was also deputy secretary-general of the CCP Central Committee and director of the General Office of the Central Secretariat. During this period, he put forward the principle of "public–private cooperation for mutual benefit" and applied it in his work. In 1944, his summary report to a production conference of organisations directly under the Central Committee was praised by Mao Zedong and others. In 1945, he was elected a member of the 7th Central Committee.

=== Second-half of the Chinese Civil War ===
On 22 October 1945, Li and other party leaders flew to Handan on an American aircraft, and on 22 November they reached Shenyang. He then became secretary of the CCP's Western Manchuria Sub-bureau and political commissar of the Western Manchuria Military Region, and established a communist base in the region. From May 1947, he was a member of the standing committee of the CCP Northeast Bureau and secretary of its finance and economic committee. From 1948, he was deputy secretary of the Northeast Bureau and deputy political commissar and head of the logistics department of the Northeast Military Region. He directed the financial and economic work of the communist-held areas of the north-east and supported the army's logistics. In August 1949, he was elected vice-chairman of the Northeast People's Government.

== People's Republic of China ==
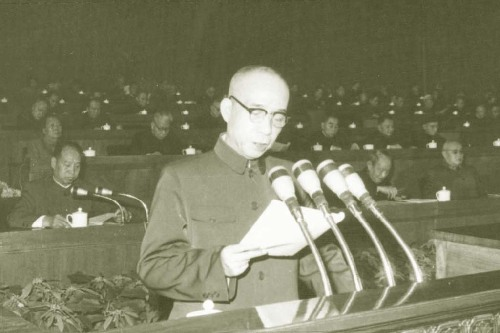
Li delivering a report at the 4th Session of the 2nd National People's Congress

After the founding of the People's Republic of China, Li became a member of the Government Administration Council, deputy director of its Finance and Economic Committee and Minister of Heavy Industry in April 1950. In September 1953, he also became deputy chairman of the State Planning Commission. In September 1954, he became vice premier and chairman of the State Planning Commission. He was elected to the Politburo in 1956 and to the Secretariat in 1958. He directed national planning and economic work, organised the drafting of national economic development plans and helped to formulate major economic policies, including the First Five-Year Plan.

After the Great Leap Forward and the Great Chinese Famine, Li devised the "eight-character policy" of "adjustment, consolidation, filling out and raising standards". He first proposed it in August 1960, and it was adopted at the Ninth Plenary Session of the 8th Central Committee in January 1961.

In 1964, Li and Bo Yibo travelled to south-west China to convey Mao's choice of Panzhihua as the future centre of steel production under the Third Front construction programme. As head of the State Planning Commission, Li set design rules stating that Third Front projects should not try to be "big and complete" or include administrative, social-service or other buildings unrelated to production. Project leaders were instead told to make do with what was available, including building rammed earth housing, so that more resources could go into production. The policy was summed up in the slogan "First build the factory and afterward housing".

=== Cultural Revolution ===
At the Eleventh Plenary Session of the 8th Central Committee in August 1966, Li was elected to the Politburo Standing Committee. During the Cultural Revolution, he assisted Premier Zhou Enlai in managing the economy, and he directed the drafting of a notice on "grasping revolution and promoting production" and a report on policy issues in finance, trade and handicrafts. He also supported the drafting of regulations on conducting the Cultural Revolution in industrial and transport enterprises, and he helped Zhou to protect persecuted senior cadres.

In 1967, Li joined Chen Yi, Ye Jianying, Tan Zhenlin, Li Xiannian, Xu Xiangqian and Nie Rongzhen in challenging the conduct of the Cultural Revolution, and the group was denounced as the "February Countercurrent". He was subsequently attacked and persecuted by the factions of Lin Biao and Jiang Qing. In October 1969, he was moved to Conghua, Guangdong, as part of the "war-preparedness evacuation" of senior leaders from Beijing.

== Death ==
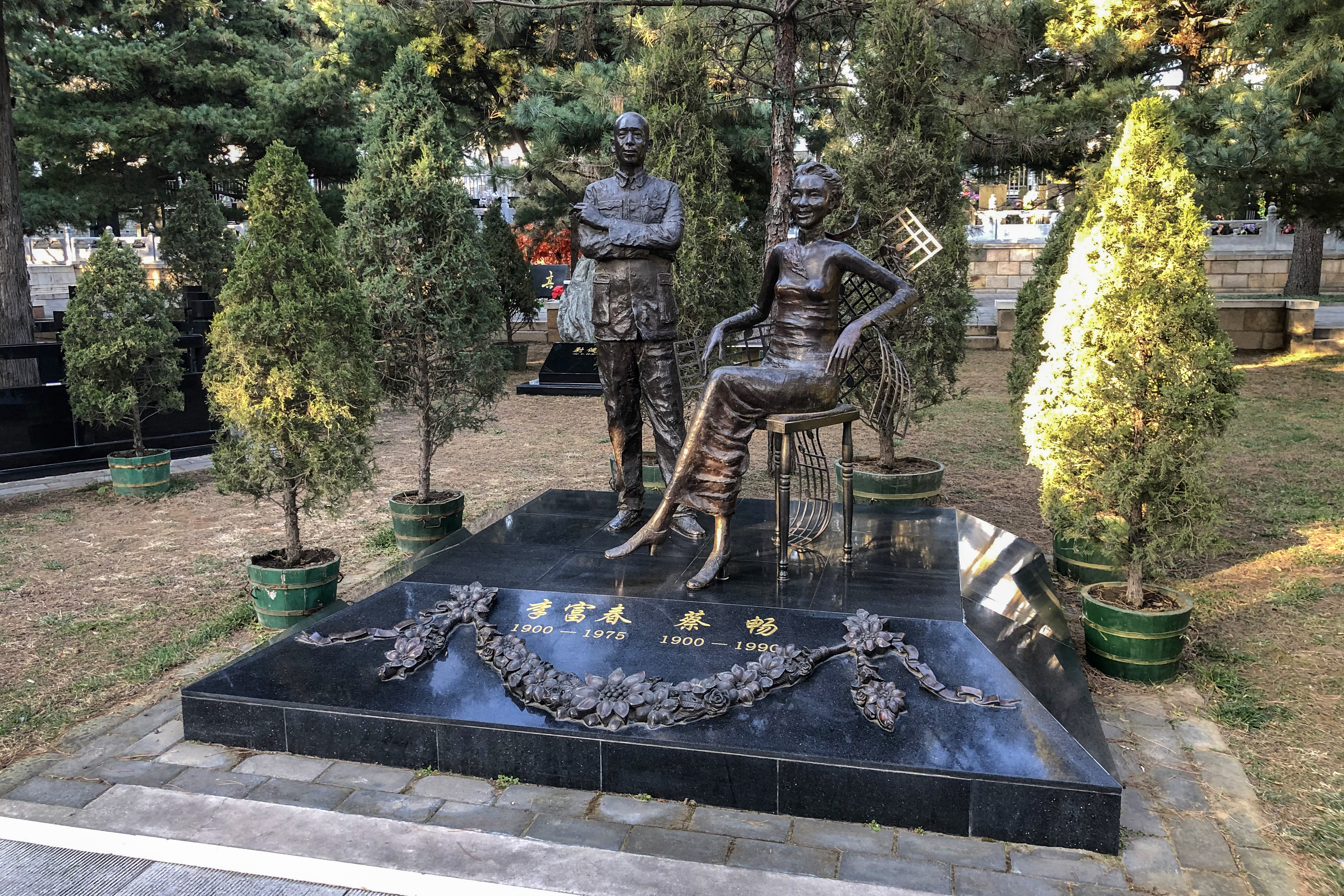
The grave of Li Fuchun and Cai Chang at the Babaoshan Revolutionary Cemetery

Li died of illness in Beijing on 9 January 1975. Later that month, the CCP Central Committee held a memorial service for him at the Great Hall of the People, at which Deng Xiaoping delivered the eulogy. He was buried at Babaoshan Revolutionary Cemetery.

== Personal life ==
Li and Cai Chang had one child, a daughter named Li Tete. She went to the Soviet Union in 1938 and graduated from the Timiryazev Agricultural Academy in Moscow in 1952. After returning to China, she worked in agricultural research for the Chinese Academy of Agricultural Sciences, and after retiring she devoted herself to poverty relief through the China Foundation for Poverty Alleviation.She died on 16 February 2021.

== See also ==
- Historical Museum of French-Chinese Friendship

Government offices
Preceded by He Changgong	Minister of Heavy Industry; 1950–1952	Succeeded by Wang Heshou
New title	Director of the Organs Production Processing Committee; 1952–1954	Succeeded by Position revoked
Preceded by Gao Gang	Director of the State Planning Commission; 1954–1975	Succeeded by Yu Qiuli
Party political offices
New title	Director of the General Office of the Chinese Communist Party; 1942–1945	Succeeded by Yang Shangkun
Military offices
Preceded by Guo Zuolin; Acting	Director of the General Political Department of the People's Liberation Army; Acting; 1934–1935	Succeeded by Bo Gu; Acting
