= He Lifeng =

Chinese politician and CCP general secretary's economic adviser

- 何立峰
- He in 2026

Vice Premier of China
- Incumbent
- Assumed office 12 March 2023 Serving with Ding Xuexiang, Zhang Guoqing, Liu Guozhong
- Premier: Li Qiang

Director of the Office of the Central Financial and Economic Affairs Commission
- Incumbent
- Assumed office October 2023
- General Secretary: Xi Jinping
- Preceded by: Liu He

Chairman of the National Development and Reform Commission
- In office 24 February 2017 – 11 March 2023
- Premier: Li Keqiang
- Preceded by: Xu Shaoshi
- Succeeded by: Zheng Shanjie

Vice Chairman of the Chinese People's Political Consultative Conference
- In office 14 March 2018 – 10 March 2023
- Chairman: Wang Yang

Personal details
- Born: 4 February 1955 (age 71) Yongding, Fujian, China
- Party: Chinese Communist Party (since 1981)
- Education: Xiamen University (BEc, MEc, PhD)
- Cabinet: Li Qiang Government

He Lifeng
- Chinese: 何立峰
Transcriptions
Standard Mandarin
- Hanyu Pinyin: Hé Lìfēng
- IPA: [xɤ̌ lîfə́ŋ]
Yue: Cantonese
- Jyutping: Ho4 Lap6-fung1

He Lifeng (Chinese: 何立峰; pinyin: Hé Lìfēng; born February 1955) is a Chinese economist and politician who has served as vice premier of China since March 2023, responsible for economic and financial affairs. He has additionally been a member of the Politburo of the Chinese Communist Party (CCP) since October 2022, and served as the director of the Office of the Central Financial and Economic Affairs Commission under CCP General Secretary Xi Jinping since October 2023.

Earlier in his career, he worked in Fujian province and Tianjin. He has held a number of significant posts, including party secretary of Fuzhou, party secretary of Xiamen, party secretary of Binhai New Area, deputy party secretary of Tianjin, Chairman of the Tianjin People's Political Consultative Conference, and, since 2014, a deputy director of the National Development and Reform Commission (NDRC). He served as the chairman of the NDRC from February 2017 to March 2023.

== Early life ==
He was born in Yongding County, Fujian into a Hakka family whose ancestral roots are usually traced to Xingning, Guangdong. In August 1973 he went to Yongding County as a sent-down youth. In November 1976, he participated in the construction of the Shixiangtan Hydroelectric Dam. After the resumption of the National College Entrance Examination, he gained admission to the Xiamen University school of economics; he studied finance. He obtained a bachelor's degree and a master's degree in 1982 and 1984, respectively, and earned his Ph.D. through part-time studies in 1998. After graduating he began work in Xiamen as a researcher for the special economic zone.

In July 1984, Wang Yishi, the vice governor of Fujian, came to the home of He Lifeng's mentor Deng Ziji and asked Deng to recommend a student to support the construction of the Xiamen Special Economic Zone. He Lifeng was recommended to become a cadre of the Xiamen Special Economic Zone Economic Research Institute and thus began his career in the government. In October, he began working for the Xiamen municipal government, beginning his career in politics.

== Local careers ==
He worked in Fujian province for some 25 years. He worked successively in Xiamen, Quanzhou, Fuzhou During this time, he cultivated close ties to CCP General Secretary Xi Jinping, who also worked in Fujian at the time; he reportedly attended Xi's wedding ceremony with Peng Liyuan. In Xiamen he headed the city's finance department (at the time, Xi Jinping was vice mayor of Xiamen). In 1990 he was promoted to party head of a city district. By February 1995 he was made mayor of Quanzhou, then party secretary. He earned a doctorate in economics at around this time. In April 2000, he became Fuzhou party secretary, by December 2001, he joined the standing committee of the Fujian Provincial Committee of the Chinese Communist Party. At the beginning of 2003, he attended report meeting on the construction of the CCP style and clean government in Fuzhou.

In May 2005 he was named party secretary of Xiamen. He joined the CCP Central Committee in 2007. In May 2009, he was transferred to Tianjin to become deputy party secretary of the municipality, the head of the working committee of Binhai New Area, and the party secretary of Tanggu District. Shortly after taking office, he proposed the "Ten Major Battles", promoting the construction of the Binhai New Area core area, Xiangluowan and Yujiabao central business districts. In January 2013, he was named chairman of the Tianjin People's Political Consultative Conference. During his tenure in Tianjin, he oversaw infrastructure projects to boost Tianjin's economy.

== National career ==
In June 2014 he was named deputy Party secretary of the National Development and Reform Commission and also deputy director (minister-level). Since then he has emerged as one of the chief figures in charge of advancing economic reform policies.

In February 2017 he was appointed the chairman of the National Development and Reform Commission by the Standing Committee of the National People's Congress. In September 2019, he published an article at the People's Daily, saying Shenzhen faced "unprecedented new tasks", and that the "problems encountered in the modernization of our country are likely to appear in Shenzhen first". In another article in the People's Daily in October 2021, he called for reducing emissions in a safe and secure way. In October 2022, he pledged to support the digital economy during a report to the National People's Congress Standing Committee.

== Vice premier ==
After the 20th Party National Congress, he was elected as a member of the 20th CCP Politburo. In February 2023, he visited the People's Bank of China. On 12 March 2023, he was appointed a vice premier of the State Council, and became responsible for economic and financial affairs. According to Bloomberg News, he will have all the financial regulators, including the People's Bank of China and the newly created super financial watchdog, under his purview. He will also oversee the property industry as well as the $60 trillion financial sector.

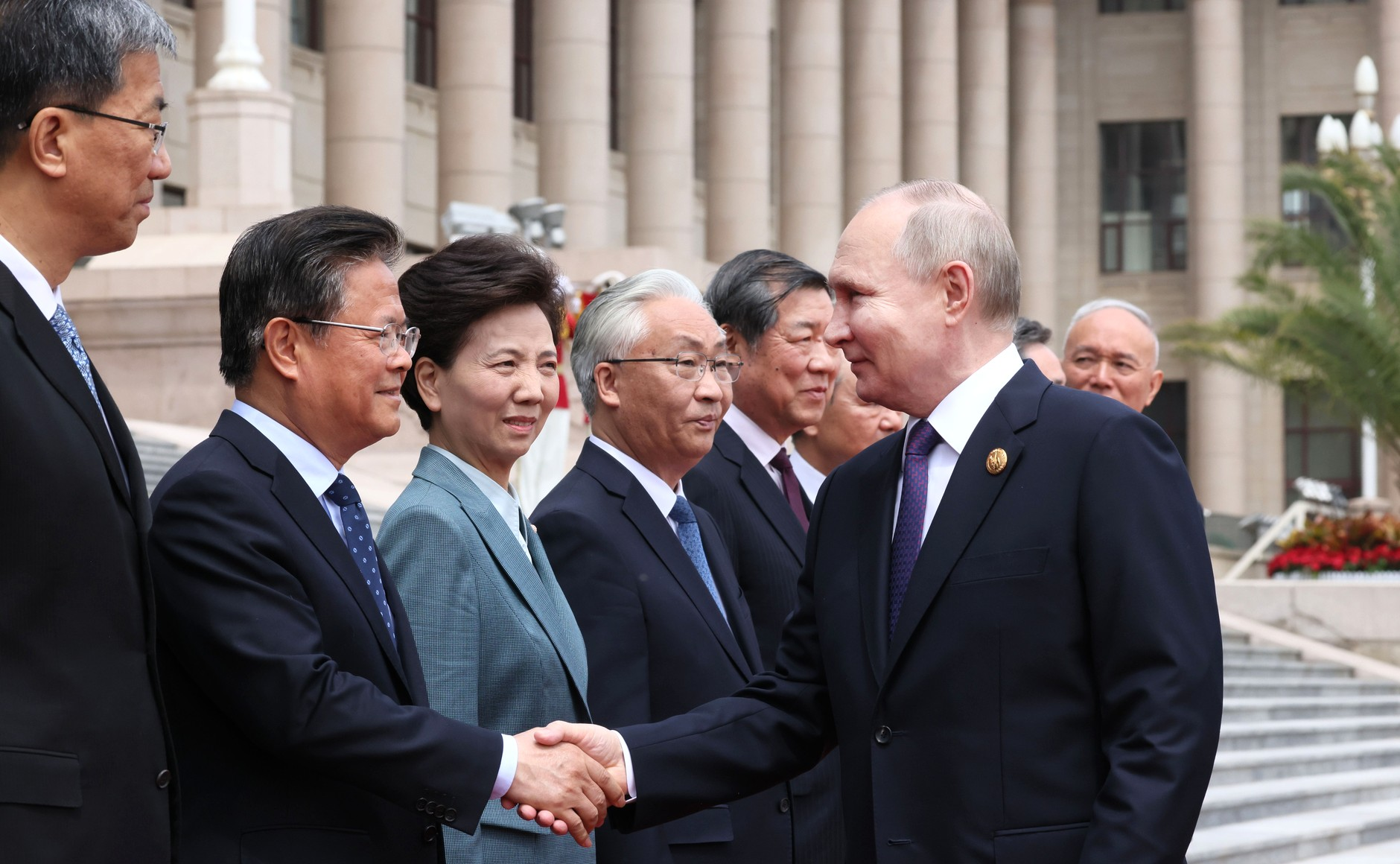
He Lifeng and Zheng Shanjie with Russian President Vladimir Putin in Beijing during Putin's visit to China in May 2024

In April 2023, he attended the China International Consumer Product Expo in Haikou, Hainan, where he said the expansion of consumption was a top priority. In May 2023, he attended the opening of the National Financial Regulatory Administration. In October 2023, he formally succeeded Liu He as the director of the Office of the CCP Central Financial and Economic Affairs Commission. He was also named as the director of the Office of the Central Financial Commission and the secretary of the Central Financial Work Commission in November. In October 2023, at the third Belt and Road Forum for International Cooperation, He said China encouraged "companies from all countries to focus on big data, artificial intelligence, e-commerce and new energy". In November 2023, He gave a pre-recorded remark to the Global Financial Leaders’ Investment Summit in Hong Kong, praising the city's "unique advantage as an international financial center". In January 2024, He called for officials to support performance and profitability of listed in during a nationwide teleconference. In July 2024, he met with a delegation of the US-China Business Council, calling on US companies to "play a strong role" in China's economy. In an article in People's Daily in the same month, he called for promoting new productive forces through a well-coordinated government and efficient market. In October 2024, during a visit to Taiyuan, Shanxi, He called for a targeted "white list" of real estate projects to stabilize the real estate market.

In April 2025, He attended a symposium in Shanghai. In the summer of 2025, He asked China's largest companies about the possible impact of artificial intelligence on employment. After hearing of major possible job cuts, the Chinese government in late 2025 warned companies, especially tech companies with younger workforces, to not cut jobs. In October 2025, during a meeting of the International Advisory Council of the National Financial Regulatory Administration. In November 2025, He undertook a three-day inspection tour to Hubei and Hunan, where he visited trade logistics companies, export-oriented manufacturers and consumer-sector companies. In June 2026, he attended the annual Lujiazui Forum in Shanghai, where he said China would strengthen legal protections against unilateral sanctions, adding "We don’t stir up trouble … but we are absolutely not afraid of it".

=== Foreign relations ===
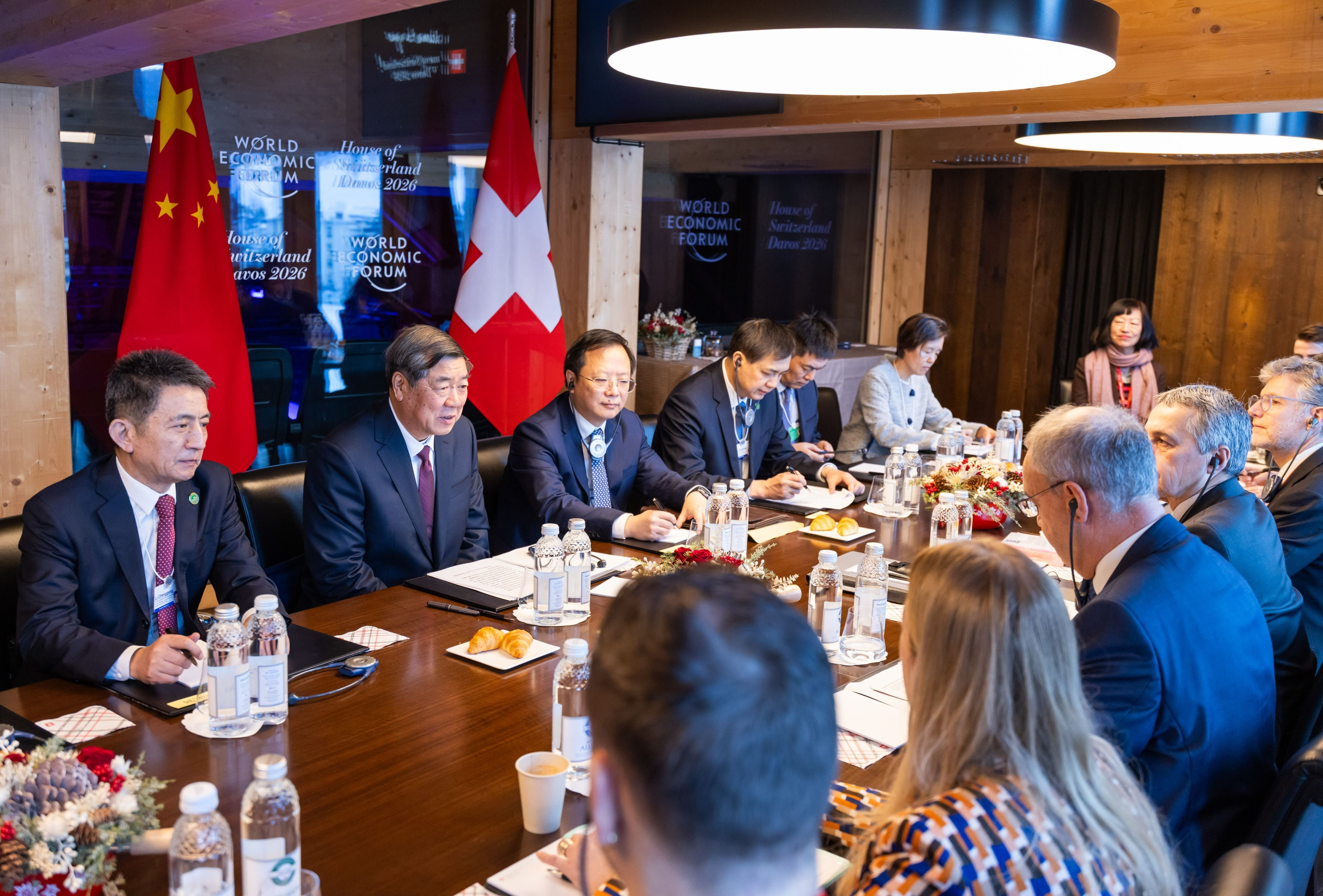
20 January 2026 – House of Switzerland at the World Economic Forum (WEF) Annual Meeting in Davos: Guy Parmelin, President of the Swiss Confederation, Federal Councillor Ignazio Cassis and State Secretary Helene Budliger Artieda welcome He Lifeng and Li Chenggang for talks on bilateral relations.

He has been China's top representative in China's economic relations with several developed economies, having been named the "lead person" in dialogues with the European Union, France, Germany, the United States, and the United Kingdom. He met with U.S. Treasury Secretary Janet Yellen when she visited China in July 2023 and April 2024. In July 2023, he visited Pakistan for talks about the China–Pakistan Economic Corridor. He visited the United States in November 2023 and met with Janet Yellen in San Francisco before the APEC summit. He also visited Russia in December 2023, where he met Deputy Prime Minister Dmitry Chernyshenko.

In January 2025, he met with UK Chancellor of the Exchequer Rachel Reeves, where they both called for closer economic cooperation and the renewal of the UK-China Economic and Financial Dialogue. In May 2025, He met with United States Treasury Secretary Scott Bessent and U.S. Trade Representative Jamieson Greer in Geneva to de-escalate China-United States trade war. In June 2025, he led the Chinese delegates to London with commerce ministers Li Chenggang and Wang Wentao and met with US Commerce Secretary Howard Lutnick. The meeting resulted on a framework for trade negotiations to resolve disputes on technology and mineral exports. In November 2025, He met with German Vice Chancellor Lars Klingbeil as part of the biannual financial dialogue talks between the two countries. In September 2026, He met with U.S., Treasury Secretary Scott Bessent and Trade Representative Jamieson Greer in New York City on the eve of Xi's state trip to the U.S., where they agreed to set up an AI dialogue.

Government offices
Preceded by Xu Shaoshi	Chairman of the National Development and Reform Commission; 2017–2023	Succeeded by Zheng Shanjie
Party political offices
Preceded by Xing Yuanmin	Deputy Party Secretary of Tianjin; 2009–2013	Succeeded by Wang Dongfeng
Order of precedence
Preceded by Chen Min'er as Member of the Politburo of the Chinese Communist Party	Order of precedence of China as Member of the Politburo of the Chinese Communist Party	Succeeded by Wang Yi as Member of the Politburo of the Chinese Communist Party
