= China Center for International Economic Exchanges =

Chinese government think tank

- 中国国际经济交流中心

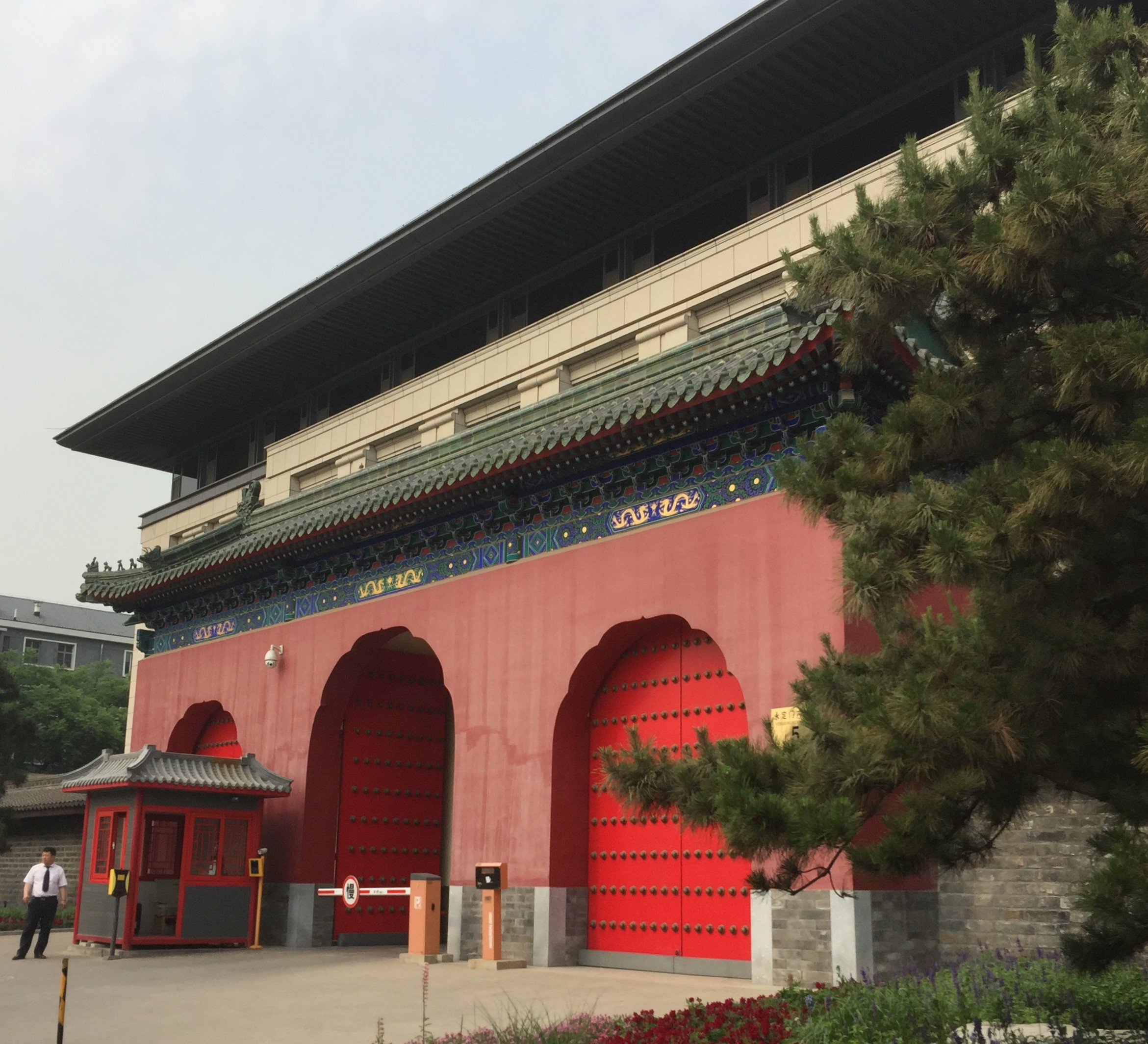
- CCIEE building in Beijing, 2018
- Abbreviation: CCIEE
- Formation: 2009; 17 years ago
- Type: Public policy think tank
- Headquarters: 5 Yong Ding Men Nei Da Jie, Xicheng District, Beijing
- Chairman: Zeng Peiyan
- Parent organization: Chinese Academy of Social Sciences
- Website: english.cciee.org.cn

The China Center for International Economic Exchanges (CCIEE) is a public policy think tank based in Beijing, founded in 2009 and operating under the Chinese Academy of Social Sciences.

The CCIEE has been noted for its tight connections to the government of the People's Republic of China. Underscoring this relationship, its offices are located a few hundred meters from Zhongnanhai.

== History ==
The institute was founded in 2009 under the National Development and Reform Commission. The establishment of CCIEE has been characterized as a demonstration of what some scholars had previously described as an emerging effort by Chinese policy leaders to create mechanisms to "facilitate broad domestic and international policy discussions" combining the expertise of political officials, business leaders, and academics returning from overseas study.

In January 2026, it was moved under the Chinese Academy of Social Sciences.

== See also ==
- Western Returned Scholars Association
