= Zheng Shanjie =

Chinese politician

- 郑栅洁
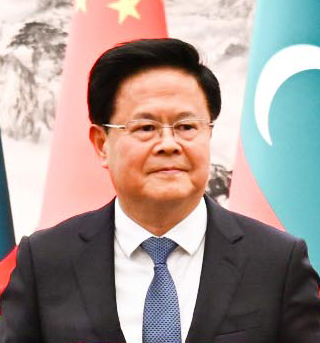
- Zheng in January 2024

Chairman of the National Development and Reform Commission
- Incumbent
- Assumed office 12 March 2023
- Premier: Li Qiang
- Preceded by: He Lifeng

Party Secretary of Anhui
- In office 30 September 2021 – 14 March 2023
- Deputy: Wang Qingxian (Governor)
- Preceded by: Li Jinbin
- Succeeded by: Han Jun

Governor of Zhejiang
- In office 4 September 2020 – 30 September 2021
- Preceded by: Yuan Jiajun
- Succeeded by: Wang Hao

Deputy Party Secretary of Zhejiang
- In office May 2018 – September 2020
- Party Secretary: Yuan Jiajun
- Preceded by: Tang Yijun
- Succeeded by: Huang Jianfa

Party Secretary of Ningbo
- In office December 2017 – September 2020
- Preceded by: Tang Yijun
- Succeeded by: Peng Jiaxue

Director of Fujian Development and Reform Commission
- In office May 2010 – March 2015
- Preceded by: Zhang Zhinan
- Succeeded by: Wei Keliang

Personal details
- Born: November 1961 (age 64) Zhangzhou, Fujian, China
- Party: Chinese Communist Party
- Education: Nanjing Tech University; Xiamen University

Chinese name
- Traditional Chinese: 鄭柵潔
- Simplified Chinese: 郑栅洁
Transcriptions
Standard Mandarin
- Hanyu Pinyin: Zhèng Shānjié
Southern Min
- Hokkien POJ: Tēⁿ Chhek-kiat

Zheng Shanjie (Chinese: 郑栅洁; pinyin: Zhèng Shānjié; Pe̍h-ōe-jī: Tēⁿ Chhek-kiat; born November 1961) is a Chinese politician who has served as the Chairman of the National Development and Reform Commission (NDRC) since March 2023, and previously as Governor as well as deputy party secretary of Zhejiang and party secretary of Ningbo.

== Early life and education ==
Zheng was born in Zhangzhou, Fujian, in November 1961. After graduating from Nanjing Tech University in 1982, he was dispatched to a factory, where he worked over a period of 15 years to the position of factory manager. He became a member of the Chinese Communist Party in June 1985.

== Career ==
In May 1997, he was transferred to Xiamen and appointed district head of Huli District. In February 2002, he served as deputy secretary-general of the Xiamen Municipal People's Government and director of the General Office of Xiamen Municipal People's Government. In March 2003, he became director and party branch secretary of the Xiamen Development Planning Commission. In April 2008, he left for Fuzhou, capital of Fujian province, where he was appointed deputy director of Fujian Development and Reform Commission. He rose to become director in May 2010. On February 1, 2015, he was elevated to vice-governor of Fujian.

In August 2015, he was transferred to Beijing and appointed deputy director of the National Energy Administration. In April 2017, he succeeded Li Yafei as deputy director of the Taiwan Affairs Office.

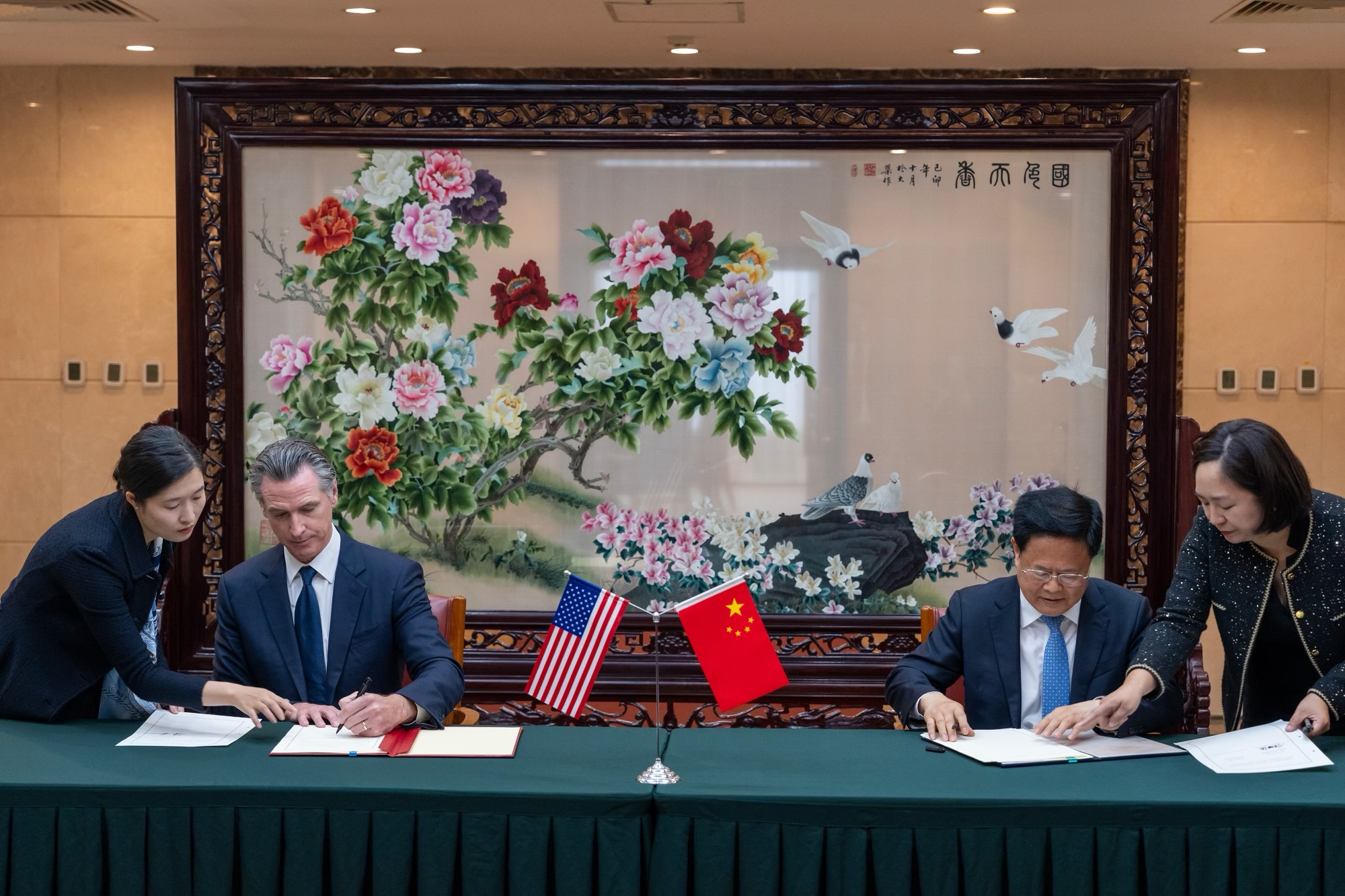
Zheng signs a memorandum of understanding with Gavin Newsom, governor of California.

On December 15, 2017, he was appointed Party Secretary of Ningbo and a member of the Standing Committee of the CCP Zhejiang Provincial Committee. On May 14, 2018, he was promoted to Deputy Party Secretary of Zhejiang. On September 4, 2020, he was appointed deputy governor and acting governor of Zhejiang. On September 29, he was elected governor at the Fourth session of the 13th Zhejiang Provincial People's Congress.

On September 30, 2021, he was transferred to Anhui province and appointed as the provincial Party Secretary.

=== As chairman of the National Development and Reform Commission ===
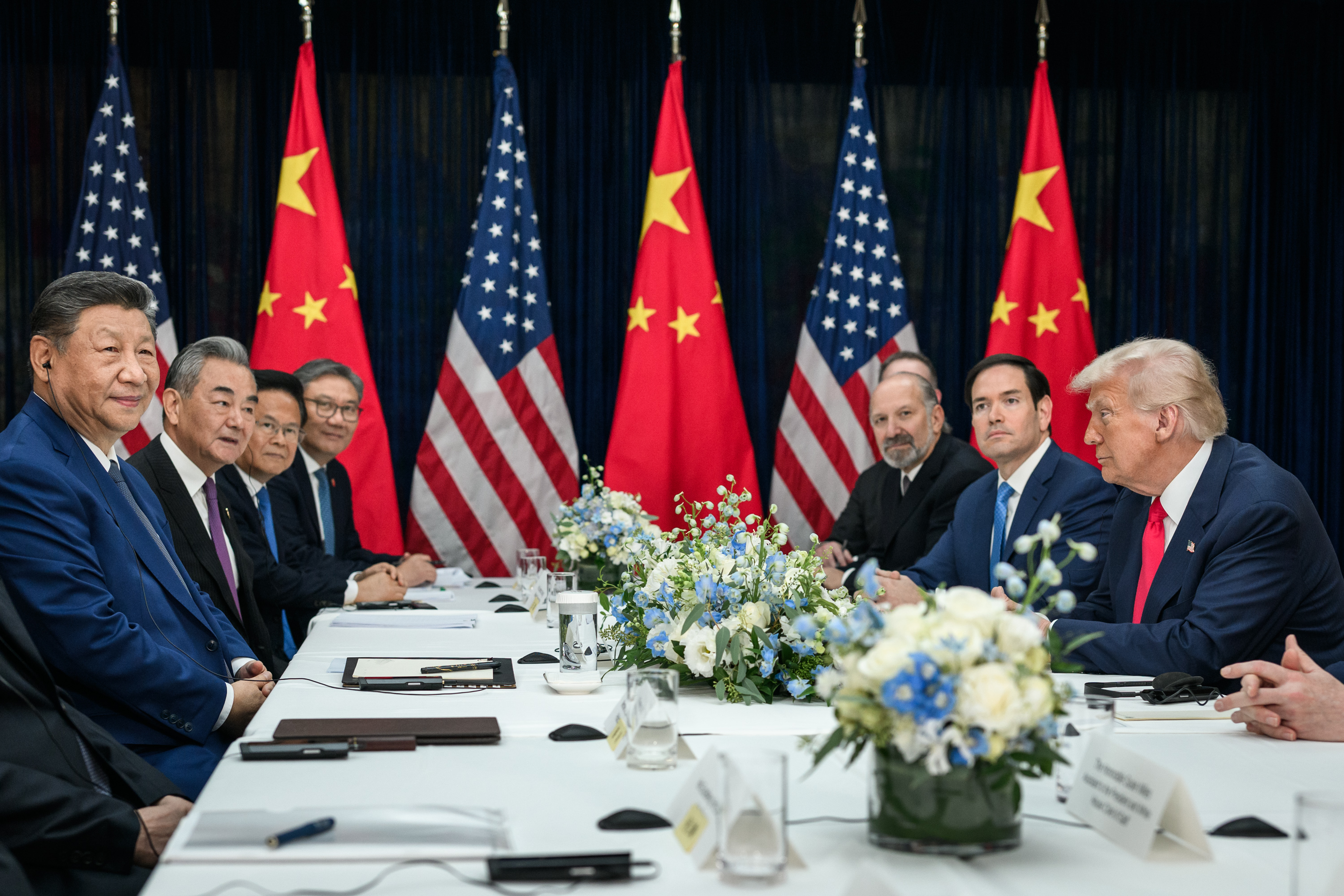
Zheng (third person from the left) during talks between US President Donald Trump and Chinese leader Xi Jinping at the APEC summit in Busan, October 2025

On March 12, 2023, Zheng was appointed as the chairman of the National Development and Reform Commission (NDRC).

As chairman of the NDRC, Zheng stated at a press conference in October 2024 that China's economy is stable but faces complex internal and external challenges. According to him, China would provide 14.12 billion USD from the 2025 budget and another 14.12 billion USD for key projects to help local governments. The country will speed up its fiscal spending. Zheng also revealed that a total 1 trillion yuan of special sovereign bonds have been issued to fund local projects and would continue to issue ultra-long special treasury bonds in 2025.

Amid the China–United States trade war, Zheng expressed his confidence in meeting China's annual growth targets despite challenges from Trump tariffs. He was one of the people who accompanied Chinese leader Xi Jinping during talks in South Korea with the US delegation headed by President Donald Trump in October 2025, which resulted on a trade truce between the two nations.

Government offices
Preceded by Zhang Zhinan	Director of Fujian Development and Reform Commission; 2010–2015	Succeeded by Wei Keliang
Preceded by Yuan Jiajun	Governor of Zhejiang; 2020–2021	Succeeded by Wang Hao
Preceded by He Lifeng	Chairman of the National Development and Reform Commission; 2023–present	Incumbent
Party political offices
Preceded by Tang Yijun	Party Secretary of Ningbo; 2017–2020	Succeeded by Peng Jiaxue
Preceded by Tang Yijun	Deputy Party Secretary of Zhejiang; 2018–2020	Succeeded by Huang Jianfa
Preceded by Li Jinbin	Party Secretary of Anhui; 2021–2023	Succeeded by Han Jun
