= Zhang Ping (politician) =

Chinese politician

- 张平
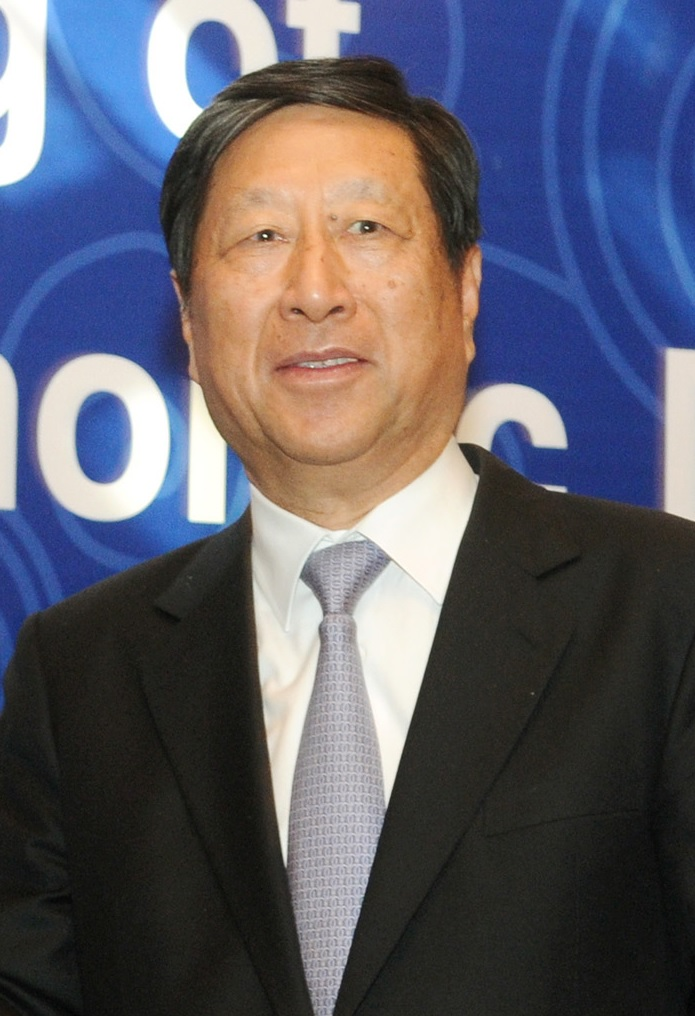
- Zhang in 2012

Chairman of the National Development and Reform Commission
- In office 8 March 2008 – 16 March 2013
- Premier: Wen Jiabao
- Preceded by: Ma Kai
- Succeeded by: Xu Shaoshi

Vice Chairman of the Standing Committee of the National People's Congress
- In office 14 March 2013 – 17 March 2018
- Chairman: Zhang Dejiang

Personal details
- Born: 1 January 1946 (age 80) Xiao County, Anhui, China
- Party: Chinese Communist Party
- Education: Anhui School of Banking

Zhang Ping (Chinese: 张平; born 1 January 1946) is a retired Chinese politician who served as the chairman of the National Development and Reform Commission, a prominent department within the State Council of the People's Republic of China, between 2008 and 2013. Prior to that, he served as deputy secretary general of the State Council from 2006 to 2008.

== Biography ==
Zhang was born in Xiao County, Anhui Province in January 1946. He graduated from the Anhui School of Banking with a concentration in credit and loans in 1966. He joined the Chinese Communist Party (CCP) in August 1979. and studied briefly at the Anhui provincial CCP school (1980–1981).

After graduation, Zhang began his career in finance, working first as accountant at the Chaoxian branch of the People's Bank of China in Anhui. He rose through the ranks, eventually becoming the branch's general manager, before joining Chao County government in 1981. Through the 1980s, he held various positions in the county and provincial governments, as well as in the nearby city of Wuhu, working mainly in economic- and planning-related positions. In 1992, he was named acting mayor of Wuhu and was made full mayor the following year.

Zhang was elevated to provincial-level positions in 1995 and, thereafter, held various high-level positions in Anhui, including assistant governor (1995–1996), vice governor (1996–1999), and deputy secretary of the CCP's Anhui Provincial Committee (1999–present). In January 2006, he was appointed secretary general of the State Council. In March 2008, he replaced Ma Kai as director of NDRC.

Zhang served as an alternate of the 16th CCP Central Committee (2002–2007) and was named a full member of the 17th Central Committee (2007–2012) in October 2007.

In March 2018, he was appointed deputy director of the National People's Congress Education, Science, Culture and Public Health Committee.

Government offices
Preceded by Ma Kai	Chairman of the National Development and Reform Commission; 2008–2013	Succeeded by Xu Shaoshi
