= National Development and Reform Commission =

Chinese government agency for macroeconomic management

- 中华人民共和国国家发展和改革委员会

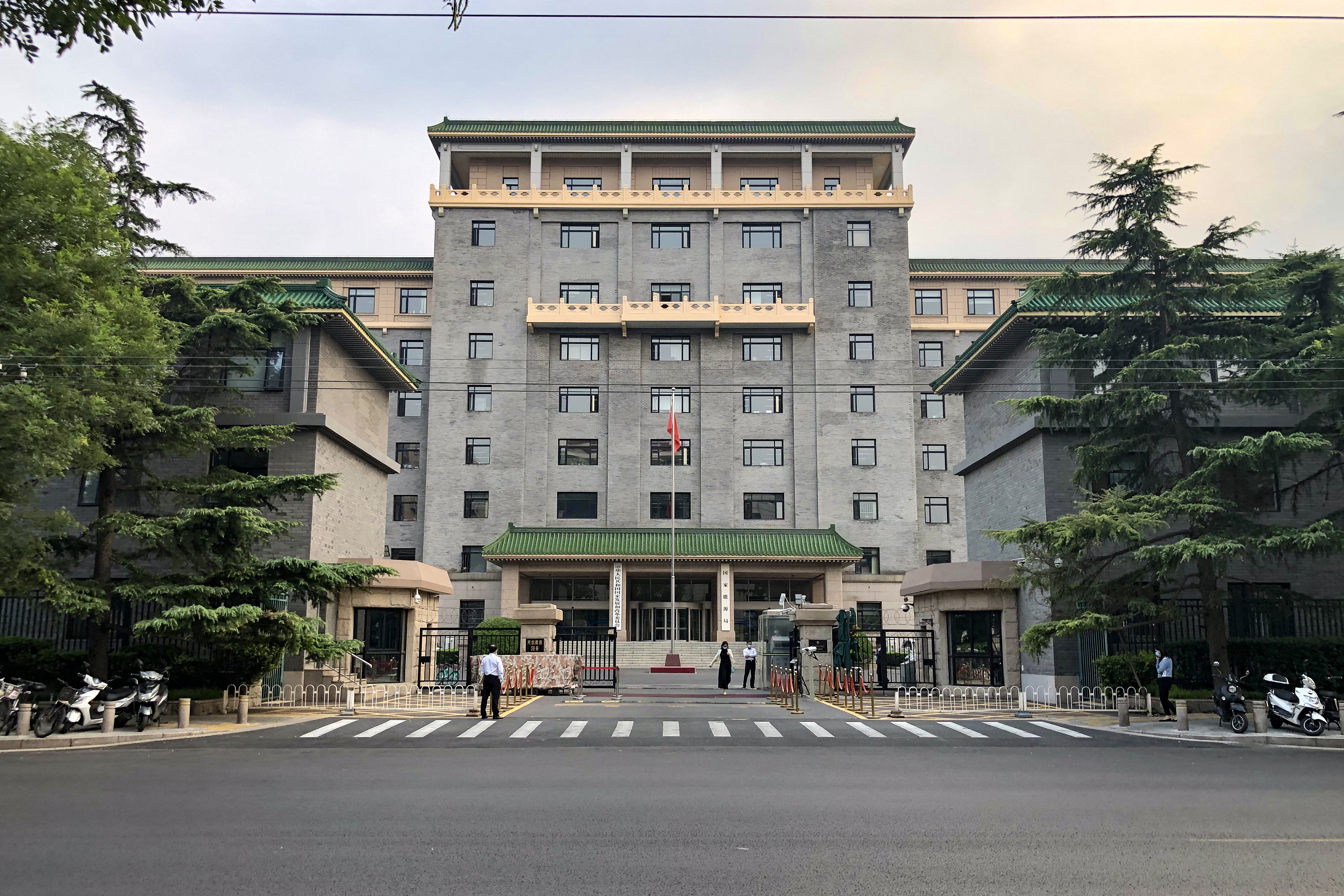
- Headquarters of the NDRC

Agency overview
- Formed: November 1952; 73 years ago
- Preceding agencies: State Planning Commission (1952–1998); State Development Planning Commission (1998–2003)
- Type: Constituent Department of the State Council (cabinet-level)
- Jurisdiction: Government of China
- Headquarters: 38 Yuetan South Street, Xicheng District, Beijing
- Minister responsible: Zheng Shanjie, Chairman
- Parent agency: State Council
- Child agency: China Center for International Economic Exchanges
- Website: en.ndrc.gov.cn

National Development and Reform Commission
- Simplified Chinese: 国家发展和改革委员会
- Traditional Chinese: 國家發展和改革委員會
Transcriptions
Standard Mandarin
- Hanyu Pinyin: Guójiā Fāzhǎn hé Gǎigé Wěiyuánhuì

Commonly abbreviated as
- Simplified Chinese: 国家发展改革委
- Traditional Chinese: 國家發展改革委
Transcriptions
Standard Mandarin
- Hanyu Pinyin: Guójiā Fāzhǎn Gǎigé Wěi

Second alternative Chinese name
- Simplified Chinese: 发改委
- Traditional Chinese: 發改委
- Literal meaning: Development Reform Commission
Transcriptions
Standard Mandarin
- Hanyu Pinyin: Fāgǎiwěi

The National Development and Reform Commission (NDRC) is the third-ranked ministerial-level cabinet department of the State Council of China and is tasked for macroeconomic management. Established as the State Planning Commission, the NDRC has broad administrative and planning control over the economy of mainland China, and has a reputation of being the "mini-state council".

== History ==
The body was first established in November 1952 as the State Planning Commission of the Central People's Government. It was modeled after Gosplan. Gao Gang was its first director. In 1954, it was transformed to the State Planning Commission of the People's Republic of China. Three of the NDRC's functions are to study and formulate policies for economic and social development, maintain the balance of economic development, and to guide restructuring of the economic system of mainland China.

In March 1998, the commission was renamed into the State Development Planning Commission. It was renamed again in March 2003 to its current name, the National Development and Reform Commission.

In 2005, the NDRC issued a circular economy-focused policy document requiring maximization of recycling and reuse of wastewater, exhaust gas, and water residue generated during mining and smelting.

In 2005, the NDRC increased the approved scope of government venture capital at national and local levels. In 2008,the NDRC supported the creation of state-backed venture funds.

In 2008, the NDRC issued a set of policies designed to further development the economies of central regions of China, consistent with the Hu-Wen administration's efforts to balance regional development.

In 2016, the NDRC and Alibaba Group signed an agreement to promote rural e-commerce development.

In 2017, the NDRC announced the creation of China's national carbon emissions trading system.

Prior to 2018, it was also responsible for enforcing China's antitrust law, but this function has been transferred to the State Administration for Market Regulation as part of the deepening the reform of the Party and state institutions. In February 2015, the NDRC completed an investigation into Qualcomm, finding that violated the Anti-Monopoly Law by imposing unreasonable requirements for patent licensing. Qualcomm was fined the equivalent of US$975 million. Also in 2018, the NDRC's climate policymaking functions were transferred to the newly created Ministry of Ecology and Environment.

On 19 December 2020, the NDRC published rules for reviewing foreign investment on national security grounds. The rules allow government agencies "to preview, deny and punish foreign investment activities in areas that are deemed as important to national security." In October 2021, the NDRC published rules restricting private capital in "news-gathering, editing, broadcasting, and distribution."

On 4 September 2023, the NDRC announced it established the Private Economy Development Bureau in order monitor the country's private economy, as well as establish regular communication with private businesses.

== Functions ==
The NDRC is China's main macroeconomic control institution, as well as the top organization in the State Council in matters related to economic policymaking. It oversees the planning system in China, including producing the Chinese Communist Party's five-year plans. The NDRC has responsibilities over economic targets, price policies, market policies, supply-side structural reform, overseas investment, domestic investment policy, regional development strategies, industrial development strategies, major infrastructure projects, consumption policy, innovation-driven development, scientific and technological infrastructure, high-tech industries, social development, basic public services and social development. NDRC's responsibility for large infrastructure is intended to prevent the economy from becoming too hot or cold, as well as to address China's overcapacity in production for sectors like aluminum, iron, steel, and energy.

The NDRC works with other departments to formulate policies, including drafting laws and regulations. It monitors Chinese businesses' outbound foreign direct investment to ensure they do not invest in blacklisted projects. The NDRC must approve sensitive projects, including projects in countries that do not recognize the People's Republic of China, projects in countries experiencing civil war or other major domestic difficulties, or projects involving sensitive subject matter like cross-border water issues or weapons production. The NDRC maintains the Negative List for Market Access, which identifies the economic sectors which cannot receive private investment.

The NDRC works with the National Health Commission to research demographic trends and formulate policies on population. It promotes sustainable development strategies. The NDRC is involved in the foreign aid process through coordinating aid to other countries for climate cooperation. The NDRC is also one of the main government agencies responsible for data collection for the Chinese Social Credit System. The NDRC's Social Development Division has a planning role in cultural industries including sports, tourism, and mass media.

The NDRC manages the General Offices several leading groups, including the National Defense Mobilization Commission, the State Council Leading Group for Western Development, and the State Council Leading Group for the Revitalization of Old Industrial Bases in Northeast China; all of these are led by the premier. It also hosts the General Offices of the State Council Leading Group for Promoting the Belt and Road Initiative, the Leading Group for Coordinated Development of the Beijing-Tianjin-Hebei Region, the Leading Group for Promoting the Development of the Yangtze River Economic Belt, the Leading Group for Promoting the Development of the Guangdong-Hong Kong-Macao Greater Bay Area, and the Leading Group for Promoting Comprehensive Deepening of Reform and Opening in Hainan; these are led by the first-ranking vice premier, with the NDRC chairman usually being the Office director.

== Structure ==
The National Development and Reform Commission has the following structure:

=== Internal organization ===
- General Office
- Policy Research Office
- Development Strategy and Planning Department
- National Economic Affairs Department
- Economic Operation Regulation Bureau
- Department of System Reform
- Fixed Asset Investment Department
- Private Economic Development Bureau
- Department of Foreign Investment and Overseas Investment (Hong Kong, Macao and Taiwan Office)
- Department of Regional Coordinated Development (Office of the Central Leading Group for Regional Coordinated Development)
- Regional Development Division
- Department of Regional Openness (Office of the Leading Group for Promoting the Construction of the Belt and Road Initiative)
- Rural Economy Department
- Department of Infrastructure Development (Office of the Leading Group for Promoting the Development of the Yangtze River Economic Belt)
- Low-altitude Economic Development Department
- Department of Industrial Development
- Department of Innovation and High Technology Development
- Department of Resources Conservation and Environmental Protection
- Social Development Department
- Employment, Income Distribution and Consumption Department
- Economic and Trade Department
- Department of Finance, Banking and Credit Construction
- Price Department
- Regulatory Department
- International Cooperation Department
- Personnel Department
- Department of Economic and Defense Coordination Development
- Evaluation and Supervision Department
- Party Committee
- Retired Cadres Bureau

=== Bureaus under the NDRC ===
- National Food and Strategic Reserves Administration (Vice-Ministerial Level)
- National Energy Administration (Vice-Ministerial Level)
- National Bureau of Statistics (Vice-Ministerial Level)

=== Directly affiliated institutions ===
- State Information Center (National E-Government Extranet Management Center)
- China Macroeconomic Research Institute
- Office Service Center
- Infrastructure Property Management Center
- Training Center (Publicity Center)
- Price Certification Center
- Research Center for Coordinated Development of Economy and Defense
- National Investment Project Review Center
- Price Monitoring Center
- International Cooperation Center
- Center for Reform and Development of Cities and Small Towns
- Price and Cost Research Center
- Belt and Road Initiative Promotion Center
- Innovation-Driven Development Center (Digital Economy Research and Development Center)
- National Energy Conservation Center (National Development and Reform * Commission Energy Conservation Information Dissemination Center)
- National Geospatial Information Center
- National Public Credit Information Center
- Business Environment Development Promotion Center
- Xi Jinping Economic Thought Research Center
- China Development and Reform Press
- China Economic and Business Magazine
- Editorial Department of Macroeconomic Management
- Editorial Department of China Economic and Trade Guide
- National Development and Reform Commission Macroeconomics Magazine

=== Advisory and deliberative bodies ===
- Academic Committee

=== Responsible social groups ===
- China Economic System Reform Research Association
- China Macroeconomics Society
- Chinese Human Resources Development Research Association
- China Center for International Economic Exchanges

=== Directly affiliated enterprise units ===
- China Planning Publishing House Co., Ltd.
- China Market Publishing Co., Ltd.

== Leadership ==
Officially, the candidate for the chairperson of the NDRC is nominated by the premier of the State Council, who is then approved by the National People's Congress or its Standing Committee and appointed by the president. The commission has been chaired by Zheng Shanjie since March 2023.

Minister in charge of the National Development and Reform Commission

1. Zheng Shanjie

Vice-ministers

1. Mu Hong - Minister level, Deputy General Office chief of the Central Leading Group for Comprehensively Deepening Reforms
2. Zhang Yong - Minister level
3. Ning Jizhe - Minister level

== See also ==
- China Compulsory Certificate
- Gosplan
- Number 10 Policy Unit
