= Ministry of science =

A science ministry or department of science is a ministry or other government agency responsible for governing scientific activities. The ministry is often headed by a minister specialising in scientific matters.

== List of ministries of science ==
Many countries have a ministry of science or ministry of science and technology:

- Ministry of Science, Technology and Productive Innovation (Argentina)
- Ministry of Science and Technology (Bangladesh)
- Ministry of Science, Technology and Innovation (Brazil)
- Innovation, Science and Economic Development Canada
- Ministry of Science, Technology, Knowledge and Innovation (Chile)
- Ministry of Science and Technology (China)
- Ministry of Science, Technology and Environment (Cuba)
- Ministry of Science, Technology and Innovation of Denmark
- Ministry of Higher Education, Science and Culture (East Timor)
- Federal Ministry of Education and Research (Germany)
- Ministry of Education, Science and Culture (Iceland)
- Ministry of Science and Technology (India)
- Ministry of Higher Education, Science, and Technology (Indonesia)
- Ministry of Science, Research and Technology (Iran)
- Department of Further and Higher Education, Research, Innovation and Science (Ireland)
- Ministry of Education, Culture, Sports, Science and Technology (Japan)
- Ministry of Education and Science (Lithuania)
- Ministry of Science and Technology (Malaysia)
- Ministry of Education and Science (Mongolia)
- Ministry of Science and Technology (Myanmar)
- Ministry of Education and Science (North Macedonia)
- Ministry of Science and Technology (Pakistan)
- Department of Science and Technology (Philippines)
- Ministry of Science, Technology and Higher Education (Portugal)
- Ministry of Science and Higher Education (Russia)
- Ministry of Education and Science (Somaliland)
- Ministry of Science and ICT (South Korea)
- Ministry of Science, Innovation and Universities (Spain)
- Ministry of Science and Technology (Sri Lanka)
- Ministry of Science and Technology (Taiwan)
- Ministry of Science and Technology (Thailand)
- Ministry of Industry and Technology (Turkey)
- Department for Science, Innovation and Technology (United Kingdom)
- Ministry of Education and Science of Ukraine
- Ministry of Science and Technology (Vietnam)
- Ministry of Technology and Science (Zambia)

== Ministers of Science ==
This is a list of Ministers who have a policy responsibility over Science.

- Brazil: Ministry of Science, Technology and Innovation (Brazil): Marcos César Pontes
- Canada: Minister of Innovation, Science and Industry: Navdeep Bains
  - Manitoba: Minister of Energy, Science and Technology (No longer used)
- China: Minister of Science and Technology: Yin Hejun
- Ireland: Minister for Further and Higher Education, Research, Innovation and Science: Simon Harris
- Japan: Minister of Education, Culture, Sports, Science and Technology: Kōichi Hagiuda
- Philippines: Secretary of Science and Technology: Fortunato dela Peña
- United Kingdom: Secretary of State for Science, Innovation and Technology: Liz Kendall
  - Minister of State for Science, Research and Innovation: Patrick Vallance
