= Hua Yuan Science and Technology Association =

American nonprofit organization

- Abbreviation: HYSTA
- Formation: 1999; 26 years ago
- Type: 501(c)(6) organization
- Tax ID no.: 77-0557640
- Location: Santa Clara, California
- Key people: Xiao Li
- Website: hysta.com

Hua Yuan Science and Technology Association 华源 (HYSTA) is a 501(c)(6) nonprofit organization, founded in 1999, aimed at business leaders, professionals, entrepreneurs and students who wish to promote business, cultural exchange, and to foster U.S. - China business relationships, and to facilitate networking and exchange of business ideas among Chinese entrepreneurs and executives in Silicon Valley and mainland China.

HYSTA has been described as linked to the Chinese government's systems of technology transfer. HYSTA is partnered with the Shanghai Association for the International Exchange of Personnel, an organization that is part of the China Association for the International Exchange of Personnel, which is under the auspices of the State Administration of Foreign Experts Affairs (now the Ministry of Science and Technology).
