= Conference on International Exchange of Professionals =

Annual event in Shenzhen, China

- English name: Conference on International Exchange of Professionals
- Location: Shenzhen, China
- Also known as: CIEP
- Organized by: Ministry of Science and Technology; Shenzhen Municipal People's Government
- Website: www.ciep.gov.cn

The Conference on International Exchange of Professionals (CIEP) is an annual event held in Shenzhen, China. It is organized by the Chinese Ministry of Science and Technology and Shenzhen Municipal People's Government.

== Annual conferences ==
Domestic and international: Each session of the CIEP has attracted professional organizations to participate in the exhibition from more than 40 countries and regions. Over the years, Li Keqiang, Wang Yang, Hu Chunhua, Zhang Dejiang, Li Yuanchao, Ma Kai, Cao Zhi, Huang Mengfu, Uyunqimg, Edmund Ho, and Hua Jianmin have attended the conference.

- Hosts: Ministry of Science and Technology, Shenzhen Municipal People's Government
- Organizers: China International Talent Exchange Center, China Science and Technology Exchange Center, Science and Technology Innovation Commission of Shenzhen Municipality, Human Resources and Social Security Administration of Shenzhen Municipality
- Co-organizers: Shenzhen Center for International Exchange of Personnel

The Conference on International Exchange of Professionals was founded in 2001 by Ministry of Science and Technology (the State Administration of Foreign Experts Affairs (SAFEA)), after an approval by the State Council.

The first conference was held in Nanjing and continued to be held there until 2005.

In 2006, the conference was moved from Nanjing to Shenyang for the first time.

In 2007, the conference was permanently shifted to Shenzhen and has been held there since then.

In 2012, the conference was held in Shenzhen and was attended by Zhao Qizheng and Alistair Michie.

In 2015, then Vice Premier of China, Ma Kai attended the conference, held in Shenzhen. The International Intellectual Forum also took part in the conference. In the following year, the conference was held between 15 and 16 April with participants from seventy countries. It also included a forum on vocational ability construction organized by the Ministry of Human Resources and Social Security.

In 2016, CIEP was held in Shenzhen organized by the State Administration of Foreign Experts Affairs (SAFEA) and the Shenzhen municipal government. The representatives from twenty countries took part in the conference.

In 2018, the conference was again held in Shenzhen and was attended by Vice-Minister of Science and Technology, Zhang Jianguo.

In 2019, 17th Conference on International Exchange of Professionals was held which was attended by Minister of Science and Technology, Wang Zhigang. Pitch@Palace, which was founded by Prince Andrew, Duke of York in 2014 was part of the event. United Kingdom was the guest of honor for the conference.

In 2020, CIEP was held virtually for the first time due to COVID-19 pandemic.

In 2022, the conference successfully held its twentieth event. The event was held virtually due to COVID-19 pandemic restrictions. It included themes such as Shenzhen Forum, Virtual Exhibition Hall, and Project Cooperation. Nanjing, Changzhou was included in the virtual city exhibition hall.

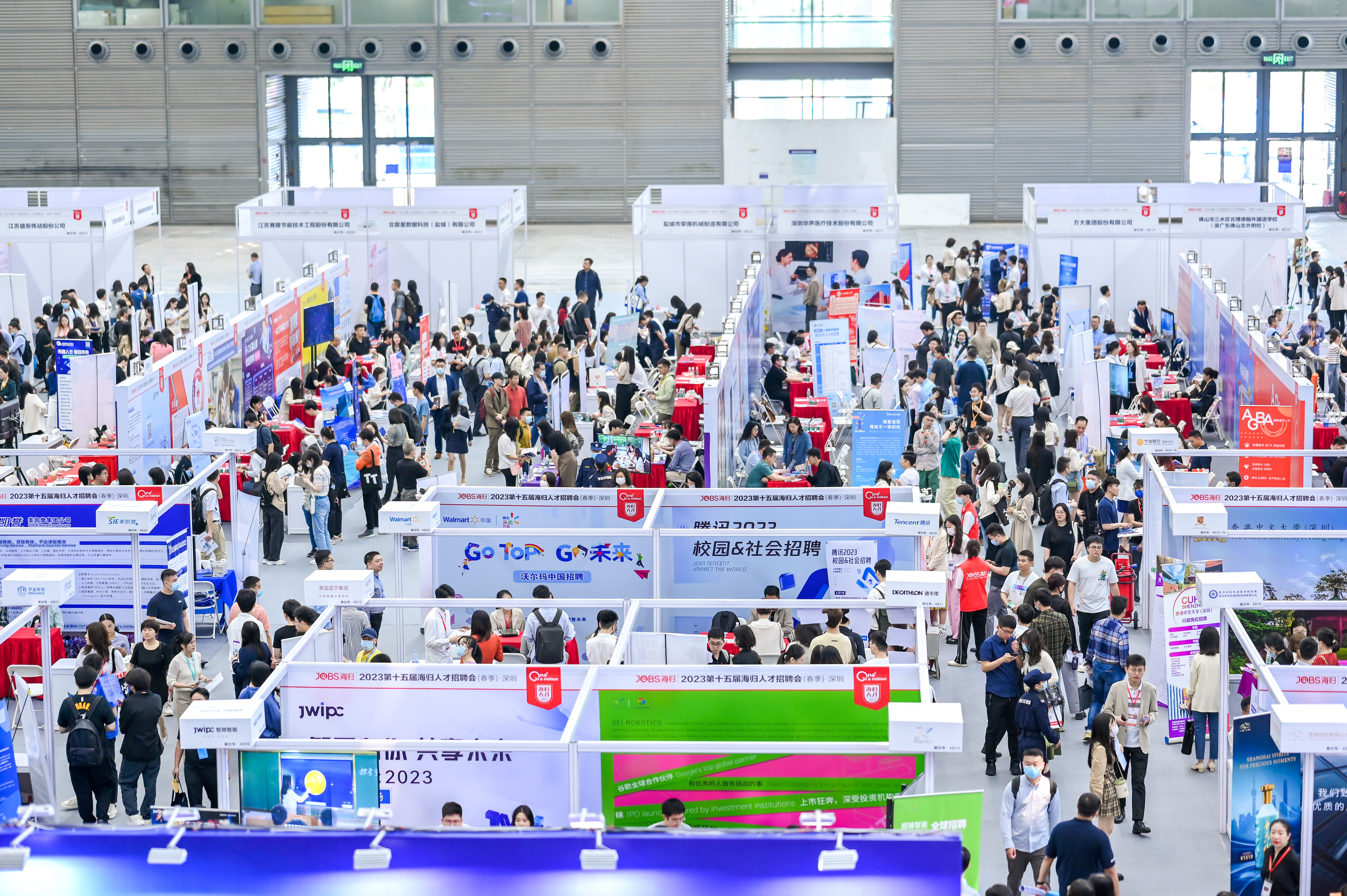
The 21st Conference on International Exchange of Professionals (CIEP) was held in Shenzhen.

In 2023, the 21st Conference on International Exchange of

Professionals (CIEP) was held in Shenzhen from April 15 to 16. The resonant theme was "Promoting scientific and technological innovation, seeking common development and benefiting global talents". The 21st CIEP was held both offline and online. It hosted 60 forums and activities, drawing 948 organizations from 28 countries. It featured 320 exhibitors showcasing 608 projects and 395 products, with an audience of over 53,000 people. The conference received extensive media coverage, with nearly 100 media outlets and 5.5 million viewers viewing the opening ceremony's live broadcast.
