= Fang Yi =

Chinese politician and diplomat (1916–1997)

- 方毅
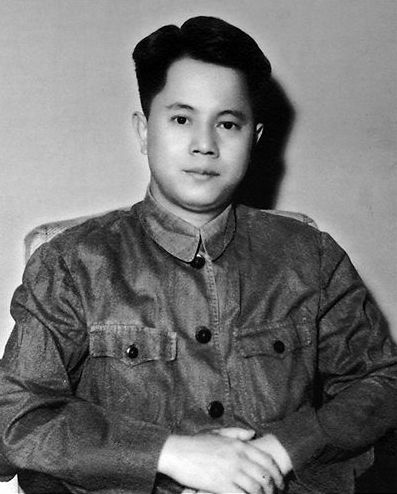
- Fang Yi in the early 1940s

State Councilor of China
- In office 1982–1988
- Premier: Zhao Ziyang

Vice Premier of China
- In office 1978–1982
- Premier: Zhao Ziyang

Director of the State Science and Technology Commission
- In office 1978–1985
- Preceded by: Nie Rongzhen
- Succeeded by: Song Jian

President of the Chinese Academy of Sciences
- In office 1979–1981
- Preceded by: Guo Moruo
- Succeeded by: Lu Jiaxi

Personal details
- Born: 26 February 1916 Xiamen, Fujian, China
- Died: 17 October 1997 (aged 81) Beijing, China
- Party: Chinese Communist Party
- Spouse: Yin Sen (m. 1940)

Fang Yi (Chinese: 方毅; Wade–Giles: Fang I; 26 February 1916 – 17 October 1997) was a Chinese Communist revolutionary, diplomat, and high-ranking politician. As a military leader, he participated in the Second Sino-Japanese War and the Chinese Civil War. After the founding of the People's Republic of China in 1949, he served as Vice Governor of Fujian, Vice Mayor of Shanghai, economic representative at the Chinese embassy in North Vietnam, President of the Chinese Academy of Sciences, and Vice Premier of China. He was also a member of the Politburo of the Chinese Communist Party.

== Early life ==
On 26 February 1916, Fang Yi was born in Xiamen, Fujian Province to a poor family. He original name was Fang Qingji (方清吉). He had an older brother, and his mother died 26 days after Fang Yi was born. His father remarried, and had another son and daughter. When Fang Yi was eight his father also died, and the family fell into abject poverty. With the help of his maternal uncle, Fang was able to attend Xiamen No. 1 Middle School, one of the best schools in Xiamen. While attending the school, he joined the Communist Youth League at age 14, and the Chinese Communist Party (CCP) a year later, in 1931.

== War-time career ==
He later went to Shanghai and worked at the Commercial Press, a leading publishing house. However, he was arrested by the Kuomintang in 1934, and sentenced to eight years in prison for his Communist activism. He was released from a Suzhou prison in 1937, after the Xi'an Incident and the Japanese invasion of China. He went on to serve as a political commissar in northern China during the Anti-Japanese War, and in the ensuing Chinese Civil War, he was Secretary General of the North China People's Government, the semi-autonomous Communist government in northern China. He also served as vice governor in the Communist government of Shandong Province.

== People's Republic of China ==
After the establishment of the People's Republic of China in 1949 following the Communist victory, Fang Yi served as vice governor in his home province of Fujian from 1949 to 1952, before briefly serving as vice-mayor of Shanghai from 1952 to 1953. He was then appointed Vice Minister of Finance in September 1953, but only served for a year before being posted, together with his wife Yin Sen, to the Chinese embassy to North Vietnam in 1954. As economic representative, he was responsible for coordinating China's assistance to North Vietnam, and served in that position until 1961.

In 1961, Fang returned to Beijing and oversaw China's foreign aid program in the Office for Economic Relations with Foreign Countries until 1976. His knowledge of multiple foreign languages, including English, German, Japanese, and Russian, was very useful to the Chinese government, which was eager to establish economic ties with foreign countries. He survived the Cultural Revolution and became an alternate member of the 9th CCP Central Committee in 1969. He led economic delegations to many, mainly African, countries, and oversaw the Tanzania–Zambia Railway project, among others.

After the death of Mao Zedong and the end of the Cultural Revolution in 1976, Fang was appointed vice president of the Chinese Academy of Sciences (CAS) and became close to Deng Xiaoping. Fang led the State Science and Technology Commission when it was revived after the Cultural Revolution.

To further promote Deng's priority of science as the forerunner of China's modernization, Deng in 1977 began a campaign to promote the 1978 National Science Conference. Fang led the team implementing it, instructing schools, factories, and communes to organize youth-focused events celebrating science and technology.

When Deng rose to power, Fang was made one of China's vice-premiers in March 1978, and was elected as a member of the 11th CCP Politburo (re-elected to the 12th Politburo in 1982). He also served as President of the CAS from 1979 to 1981. Under Deng's leadership, China established economic contacts with the Western world, and Fang led Chinese delegations to Japan and West Germany. He also accompanied Deng on the latter's historic visit to the United States in January 1979. Fang headed a separate delegation to American technological centers, such as the Georgia Institute of Technology, the Texas Medical Center, and a Lockheed plant near Los Angeles, with the aim of advancing China's industry.

In May 1982, Fang became a state councilor, serving until 1988. He was also a member of the Presidium of the 12th Congress of the CCP. In 1988, he was appointed a Vice Chairman of the Chinese People's Political Consultative Conference, serving until 1993. He was honorary chairman of the Chinese Weiqi Association from 1977 until his death.

On 17 October 1997, Fang Yi died in Beijing at the age of 81.

== Personal ==
Fang Yi married his wife Yin Sen (殷森) in 1940, when he was fighting in Anhui Province during the Sino-Japanese War. Because his parents died early, he did not know his own birthdate until he got in touch with relatives when he was 60.
