= Zhu Lilan =

Chinese politician

- 朱丽兰

Chairperson of the National People's Congress Education, Science, Culture and Public Health Committee
- In office March 2003 – March 2008
- Preceded by: Zhu Kaixuan
- Succeeded by: Bai Keming

Minister of Science and Technology
- In office March 1998 – February 2001
- Premier: Zhu Rongji
- Preceded by: Song Jian
- Succeeded by: Xu Guanhua

Personal details
- Born: August 1935 (age 91) Shanghai, China
- Party: Chinese Communist Party
- Education: Odessa University

Chinese name
- Simplified Chinese: 朱丽兰
- Traditional Chinese: 朱麗蘭
Transcriptions
Standard Mandarin
- Hanyu Pinyin: Zhū Lìlán

Zhu Lilan (Chinese: 朱丽兰; born August 1935) is a Chinese politician who served as minister of science and technology from 1998 to 2001 and chairperson of the National People's Congress Education, Science, Culture and Public Health Committee from 2003 to 2008.

Zhu was an alternate member of the 14th Central Committee of the Chinese Communist Party and a member of the 15th Central Committee of the Chinese Communist Party. She was a member of the Standing Committee of the 9th and 10th National People's Congress.

== Biography ==
Zhu was born in Shanghai in August 1935, while her ancestral home in Wuxing County (now Huzhou), Zhejiang. After graduating from McTyeire School in 1955, she was sent to study at Odessa University on government scholarships. She returned to China in 1961 and successively served as research team leader, deputy director of the office, deputy research director, associate researcher, and director of the Institute of Chemistry, Chinese Academy of Sciences. She was a visiting scholar at the University of Freiburg from 1979 to 1980.

Zhu joined the Chinese Communist Party (CCP) in July 1956, and got involved in politics in 1986, when she was appointed executive deputy director of the National Technical Committee. During his term in office, she headed the 863 Program, a program funded and administered by the government of the People's Republic of China intended to stimulate the development of advanced technologies in a wide range of fields for the purpose of rendering China independent of financial obligations for foreign technologies. In March 1998, she was promoted to become minister of science and technology, a position she held until February 2001. In February 2001, she became deputy chairperson of the National People's Congress Education, Science, Culture and Public Health Committee, rising to chairperson in March 2008.

== Honours and awards ==
- August 1997 Fellow of the International Eurasian Academy of Sciences

Government offices
Preceded by Song Jian	Minister of Science and Technology; 1998–2001	Succeeded by Xu Guanhua
Assembly seats
Preceded by Zhu Kaixuan	Chairperson of the National People's Congress Education, Science, Culture and Public Health Committee; 2003–2008	Succeeded by Bai Keming
Non-profit organization positions
Preceded by Ni Zhifu	President of the China Invention Association; 2005–2021	Succeeded by Wu Zhaohui
