= Xu Guanhua =

Chinese scientist and politician

- 徐冠华
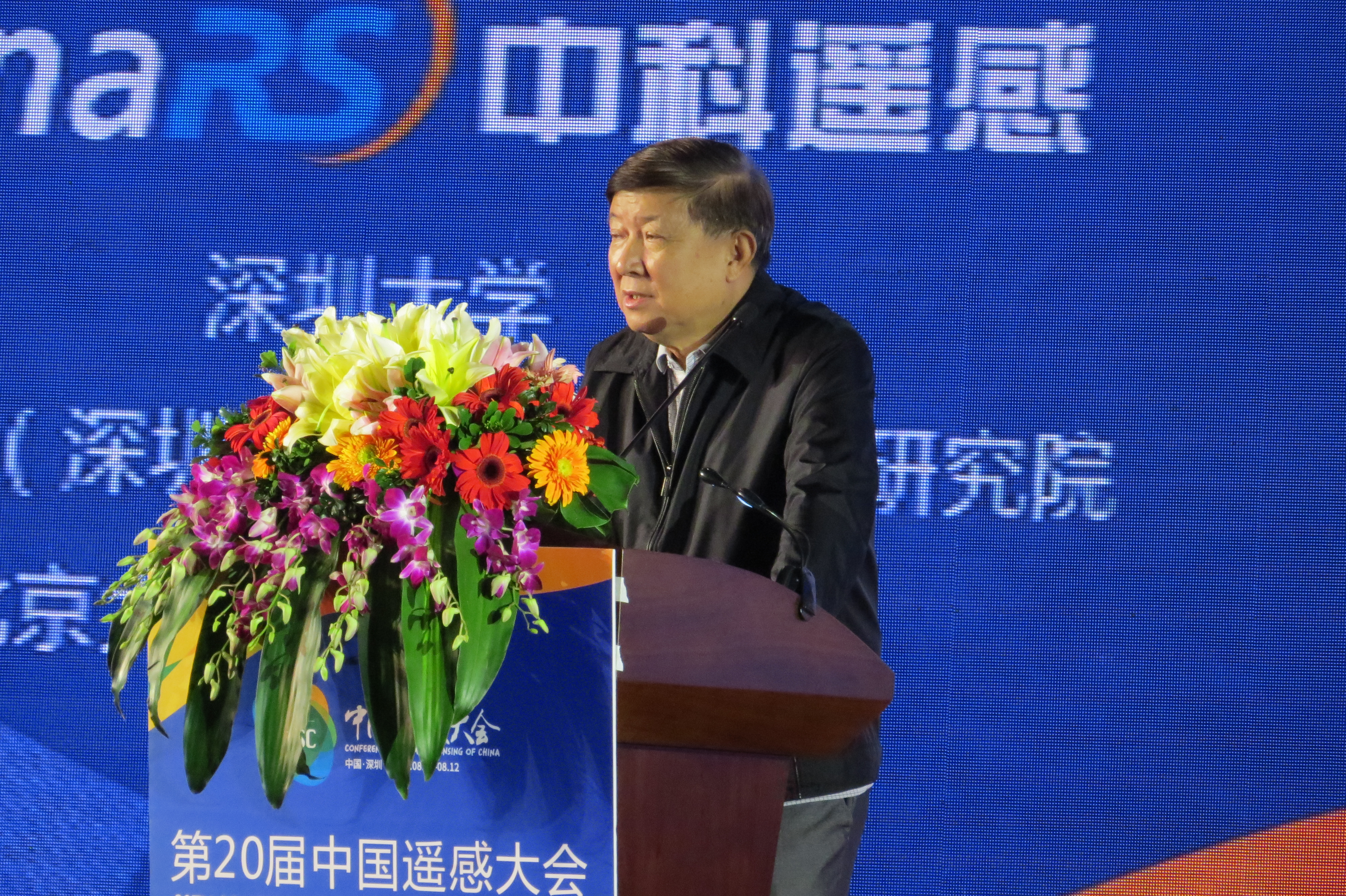
- Xu in August 2016

Chairperson of the Education, Science, Health and Sports Committee of the Chinese People's Political Consultative Conference
- In office March 2008 – March 2013
- Preceded by: Liu Zhongde
- Succeeded by: Zhang Yutai

Minister of Science and Technology
- In office 28 February 2001 – 27 April 2007
- Premier: Zhu Rongji; Wen Jiabao
- Preceded by: Zhu Lilan
- Succeeded by: Wan Gang

Personal details
- Born: 16 December 1941 (age 84) Shanghai, China
- Party: Chinese Communist Party
- Spouse: Yu Dongjie
- Children: 2
- Education: Beijing Forestry University; Stockholm University
- Scientific career
- Fields: Remote sensing application
- Institutions: Chinese Academy of Forestry (1963–1971); Chang'an University (1971–1979); Chinese Academy of Sciences (1993–1998)

Chinese name
- Simplified Chinese: 徐冠华
- Traditional Chinese: 徐冠華
Transcriptions
Standard Mandarin
- Hanyu Pinyin: Xú Guànhuá

Xu Guanhua (Chinese: 徐冠华; born 16 December 1942) is a Chinese scientist and politician who served as Minister of Science and Technology from 2001 to 2007. He also served as chairperson of the Education, Science, Health and Sports Committee of the Chinese People's Political Consultative Conference from 2008 to 2013. He was a member of the 16th Central Committee of the Chinese Communist Party. He was a member of the Standing Committee of the 11th Chinese People's Political Consultative Conference.

== Biography ==
Xu was born in Shanghai, on 16 December 1942. After graduating from Beijing Forestry University in 1963, he was assigned to the Chinese Academy of Forestry, where he successively served as research intern, teacher, assistant researcher, researcher, and director of its Resource Information Institute. In 1971, he joined the faculty of Chang'an University, and worked there until 1979.

After the Reform and Opening Up in 1979, he was sent to study at Stockholm University on government scholarships, and returned to China in 1981. He joined the Chinese Communist Party (CCP) in September 1984. He was appointed director of the Institute of Remote Sensing Applications, Chinese Academy of Sciences, in February 1993, and was elevated to vice president in August 1994.

Xu got involved in politics in 1995, when he was chosen as deputy director of the National Technical Committee. After the institutional reform, he served as the vice minister of science and technology in 1998. He moved up the ranks to become minister on 28 February 2001. In March 2008, he took office as chairperson of the Education, Science, Health and Sports Committee of the Chinese People's Political Consultative Conference, serving in the post until his retirement in March 2013.

== Personal life ==
Xu married Yu Dongjie (裕东洁), the couple have a son and a daughter.

== Honors and awards ==
- October 2003 Foreign Fellow of the Royal Swedish Academy of Engineering Sciences

Government offices
Preceded by Zhu Lilan	Minister of Science and Technology; 2001–2007	Succeeded by Wan Gang
Assembly seats
Preceded by Liu Zhongde	Chairperson of the Education, Science, Health and Sports Committee of the Chinese People's Political Consultative Conference; 2008–2013	Succeeded by Zhang Yutai
