= Wu Zhaohui =

Chinese computer scientist

- 吴朝晖
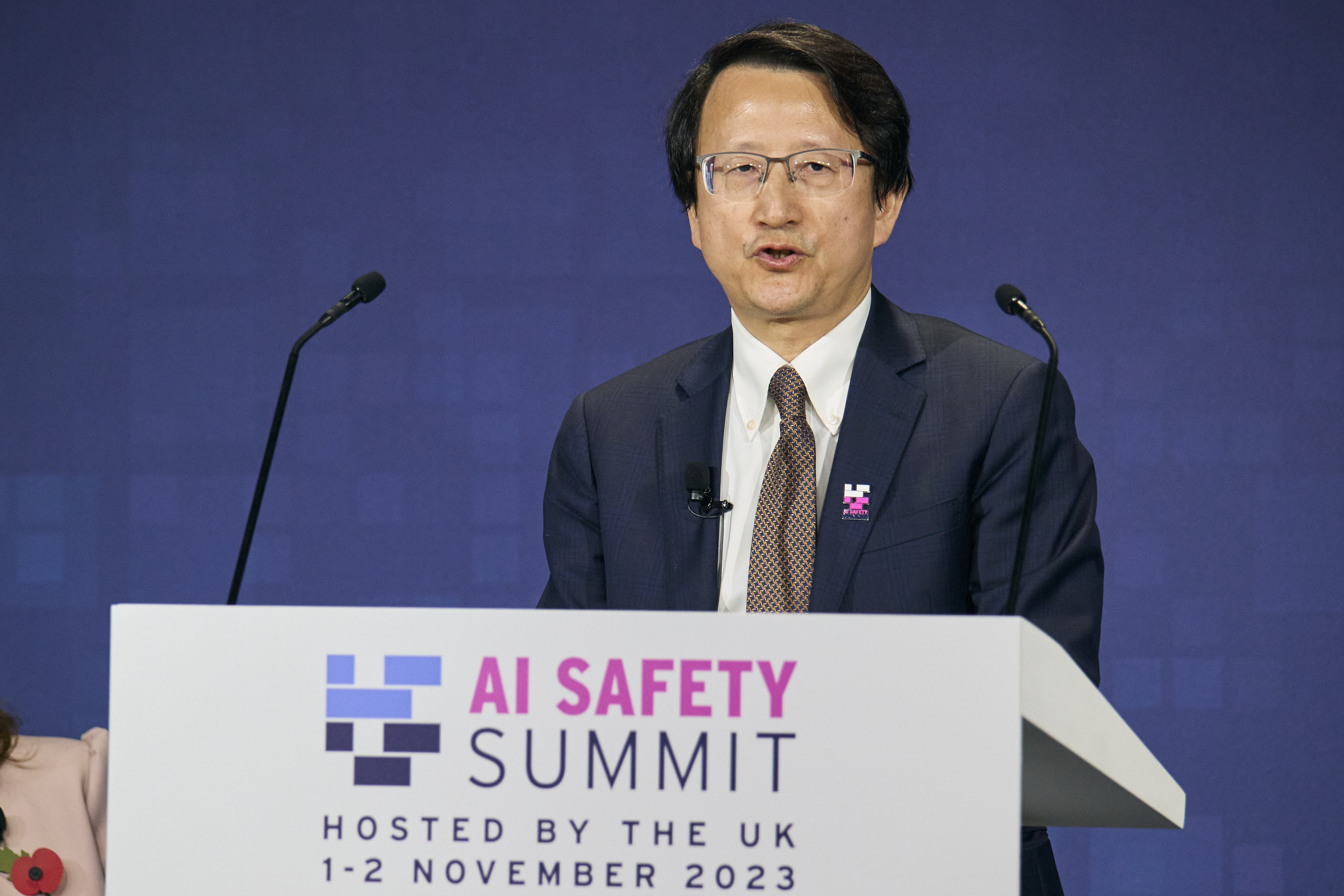
- Wu in 2023

Vice President of the Chinese Academy of Sciences
- Incumbent
- Assumed office April 2024
- President: Hou Jianguo
- Preceded by: Yin Hejun

President of Zhejiang University
- In office May 2015 – December 2022
- Preceded by: Lin Jianhua
- Succeeded by: Du Jiangfeng

Personal details
- Born: December 1966 (age 59) Wenzhou, Zhejiang
- Parent: Wu Xuequan
- Education: Zhejiang University
- Known for: Cyborg intelligence
- Awards: Member of the Chinese Academy of Sciences

Chinese name
- Traditional Chinese: 吳朝暉
- Simplified Chinese: 吴朝晖
Transcriptions
Standard Mandarin
- Hanyu Pinyin: Wú Zhāohuī

Wu Zhaohui (Chinese: 吴朝晖; born December 1966) is a Chinese computer scientist. He is a professor who had served as president of Zhejiang University from 2015 to 2022. He was elected to the Chinese Academy of Sciences in 2017.

== Early life and education ==
Wu was born in Wenzhou, Zhejiang in December 1966. His father Wu Xuequan was academic director of Wenzhou No. 7 High School. He has a younger sister. He entered Zhejiang University in 1984, where he received his Ph.D. in computer science in 1993.

== Career ==
Wu is a professor in the College of Computer Science and Technology at Zhejiang University before he was named in May 2015 to be President of the university. In 2007, he was assistant to university president and then vice president and executive vice president. Currently, he also serves as a director of the National Panel of Modern Service Industry, vice president of the China Association of Higher Education, and vice president of the Chinese Health Information Association.

In November 2022, Wu became the vice minister of Ministry of Science and Technology.

In April 2024, Wu was appointed as vice president of the Chinese Academy of Sciences (CAS), a position at (ministerial level).

== Research ==
Wu's major research is focused on cyborg intelligence in the computer science and technology discipline. He was a chief scientist in the 973 Project and an information expert in the 863 Project. His research covers cyborg intelligence, A.I., service computing, and computational intelligence.

== Awards ==
- Member, Chinese Academy of Sciences (2017)

Educational offices
Preceded by Yin Hejun	Vice President of the Chinese Academy of Sciences; 2020–2023	Incumbent
Previous: Lin Jianhua	President of Zhejiang University; 2015–2022	Succeeded by Du Jiangfeng
Non-profit organization positions
Preceded by Zhu Lilan	President of the China Invention Association; 2021	Incumbent
