= Wan Gang =

Chinese retired politician

- 万钢
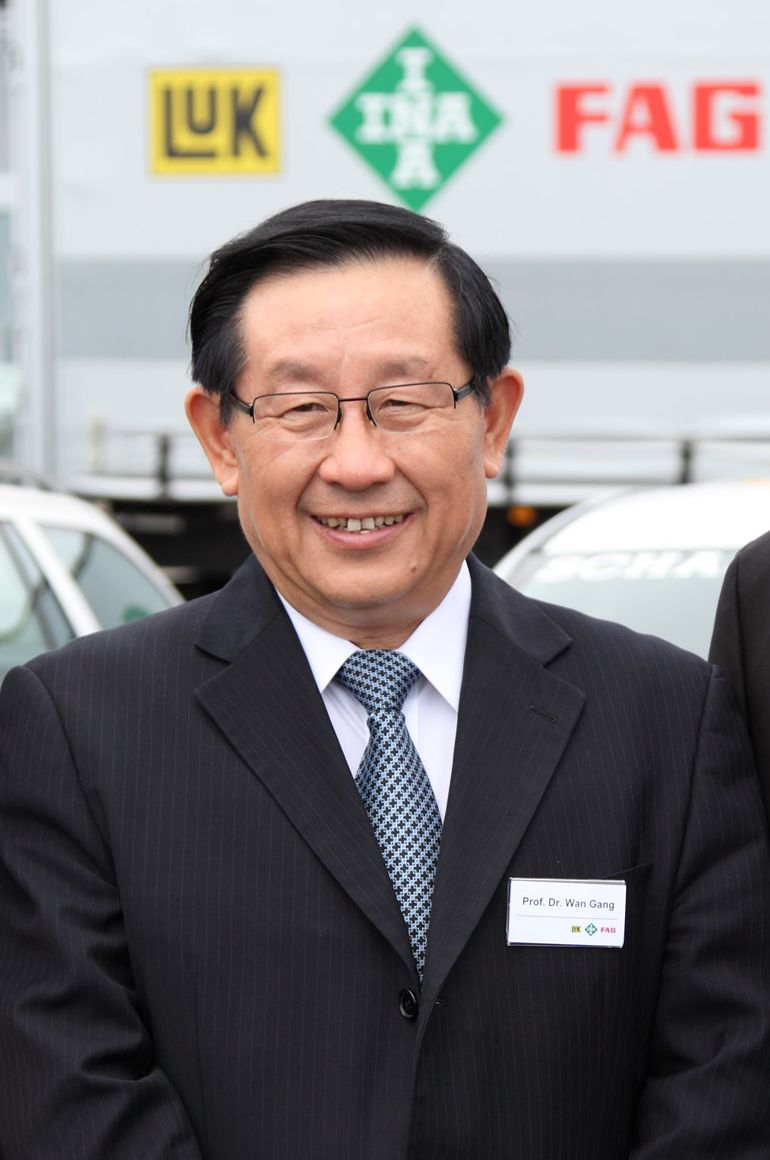
- Wan in 2011

Vice Chairman of the Chinese People's Political Consultative Conference
- In office 13 March 2008 – 10 March 2023
- Chairman: Jia Qinglin; Yu Zhengsheng; Wang Yang

Minister of Science and Technology
- In office 27 April 2007 – 19 March 2018
- Premier: Wen Jiabao; Li Keqiang
- Preceded by: Xu Guanhua
- Succeeded by: Wang Zhigang

Chairman of the China Zhi Gong Party
- In office 21 December 2007 – 14 December 2022
- Preceded by: Luo Haocai
- Succeeded by: Jiang Zuojun

Personal details
- Born: August 1952 (age 74) Shanghai, China
- Party: China Zhi Gong Party
- Education: Northeast Forestry University; Tongji University; Clausthal University of Technology

Wan Gang (Chinese: 万钢; pinyin: Wàn Gāng, born August 1952) is a Chinese expert on automobiles and retired politician, who served as the minister of science and technology from 2007 to 2018. The chairman of the China Zhi Gong Party from 2007 to 2022, Wan was one of the few non-Chinese Communist Party (CCP) ministers in China's State Council.

A graduate of the Northeast Forestry University, Wan was a visiting scholar to the Clausthal University of Technology in Germany from 1985 to 1991. He started working for Audi in 1991, where he contributed to research and development efforts. After proposing for China to focus on new car technologies using clean fuel in 2000, he was invited by the Chinese government to return to China to head the electric automobile projects in the 863 Program. He became the president of Tongji University in 2002, serving there until 2007.

In 2007, he was appointed the minister of science and technology. He also became the chairman of the China Zhi Gong Party later that year, and was appointed a vice chairman of the Chinese People's Political Consultative Conference in 2008. As minister, Wan promoted the development of electric vehicles, and has been nicknamed the "father of China's electric car industry". He retired as minister in 2018, and later stepped down as CPPCC vice chairman in 2023.

== Early life and education ==
Wan was born in Shanghai in August 1952. During the Down to the Countryside Movement, Wan was sent to Sandao Commune in Yanji County, Jilin Province from 1969 to 1975. In October 1975, Wan attended the Northeast Forestry University as a worker-peasant-soldier student. After graduating in 1978, he stayed at the university to teach in the Physics Teaching and Research Section. In 1979, he did his postgraduate study on experimental mechanics in Structural Theories Research Institute of Tongji University and received his master degree in 1981.

In the same year, he stayed on campus and taught mathematics and mechanics. In 1985, he went to Germany as a visiting scholar and doctoral candidate of Department of Mechanical Engineering in Clausthal University of Technology and received Ph.D. (Dr.-Ing.) with good honor five years later.

== Technical career ==
After his graduation in 1991, Wan received job offers from all the big German automakers, but chose to work in Audi as it was the smallest and offered the best chance at promotion.

In the year of 2000, Wan made a strategic proposal (Regarding Development of Automobile New Clean Energy as the Starting Line for Leap- Forward of China's Automobile Industry) to the State Council of China to develop a new type of automobile propelled by new clean fuel, with a view to ushering Chinese auto industry onto a new stage. He theorized that China would never be able to catch up to foreign manufacturers in traditional vehicles, thus prioritizing new technologies would give the country a more equal-footing, while also curbing its dependency on oil.

His proposal received the attention and support from the Ministry of Science and Technology and the State Economic and Trade Commission. By the end of 2000, he returned to China upon the invitation of the Ministry of Science and Technology and was appointed as chief scientist and group leader of the 863 Program key electric automobile projects assigned by Ministry of Science and Technology. He also took the responsibility of major supervisor to handle the most demanding part in this project ---- the developing of fuel cell sedan, which deals with the most complicated technologies as well as the heaviest working load. This project was nominated as one of the "Ten Greatest Scientific and Technological Progresses of Chinese Higher Schools in 2005".

In 2002, Wan worked as Assistant President of Tongji University; in 2003, Vice (Acting) President of Tongji; in July 2004, President of Tongji. He was also the founding dean of New Energy Automobile Engineering Center at Tongji.

== Political career ==
Wan was a member of the standing committee of the 10th Chinese People's Political Consultative Conference (CPPCC). He has been chairman of the China Zhi Gong Party from December 2007 to December 2022, a vice president in the Association for Science and Technology of Shanghai since 2006, and a vice chairman of the CPPCC from 2008 to 2023.

=== Minister of Science and Technology ===
Wan was appointed the Minister of Science and Technology on 27 April 2007. He was the first cabinet minister from a non-Communist party since the late 1970s when China launched its reform and opening up drive.

While as minister, Wan promoted the development of electric vehicles. He promoted building a fleet of electric buses before the 2008 Beijing Olympics, putting a thousand battery electric vehicles in every Chinese city, and implementing subsidies for EV developers. Due to his efforts at promoting EVs, he has been called the "father of China's electric car industry".

In February 2009, Wan and US energy secretary Steven Chu announced the US-China Clean Energy Research Center (CERC) during a visit by Chu to China. Wan was an advocate for CERC throughout its existence.

Wan retired as the minister of science and technology in 2018.

Party political offices
Previous: Luo Haocai	Chairman of China Zhi Gong Party; 2007–2022	Next: Jiang Zuojun
Government offices
Preceded by Xu Guanhua	Minister of Science and Technology; 2007–2018	Succeeded by Wang Zhigang
Educational offices
Preceded by Wu Qidi	President of Tongji University; June 2003 – August 2007	Succeeded by Pei Gang (裴钢)
Professional and academic associations
Preceded by Han Qide	President of the China Association for Science and Technology; 2016–present	Incumbent
