= Central Science and Technology Commission =

Commission of the Central Committee of the Chinese Communist Party (CCP)

- 中央科技委员会
- Emblem of the Chinese Communist Party

Agency overview
- Formed: March 2023
- Type: Policy coordination and consultation body
- Jurisdiction: Chinese Communist Party
- Headquarters: Beijing
- Agency executives: Ding Xuexiang, Leader; Yin Hejun, Office Director
- Parent agency: Central Committee of the Chinese Communist Party

Central Science and Technology Commission
- Simplified Chinese: 中央科技委员会
- Traditional Chinese: 中央科技委員會
Transcriptions
Standard Mandarin
- Hanyu Pinyin: Zhōngyāng Kējì Wěiyuánhuì

The Central Science and Technology Commission (CSTC) is a commission of the Central Committee of the Chinese Communist Party (CCP) that supervises and coordinates science and technology related policymaking across ministries, agencies, research institutes and industry.

== History ==
The CSTC was established in March 2023 under CCP general secretary Xi Jinping as part of a series of institutional reforms. The commission held its first meeting in July 2023. The Ministry of Science and Technology subsequently announced on its website that cadres were studying the outcome of the meeting. In June 2024, Vice Premier Ding Xuexiang was revealed to be the leader of the Commission.

== Role and organization ==
According to the reform measures announced in March 2023, the CSTC will conduct strategic planning and policy setting for science and technology development. taking over these functions from the Ministry of Science and Technology (MOST). The Ministry will instead be handling the administrative functions of the commission. It will also supervise and coordinate science and technology related policymaking across ministries, agencies, research institutes and industry. The responsibilities of the office of the CSTC will be assumed by the newly reorganized MOST.

== Membership ==
=== 20th Committee ===
- Leader
  - Ding Xuexiang, First-ranked Vice Premier
- Office Director
  - Yin Hejun, Minister of Science and Technology
- Office Deputy Director
  - Lin Xin, Vice Minister of Science and Technology
