= US–China Clean Energy Research Center =

American and Chinese research institute

The US–China Clean Energy Research Center (CERC) was a center for joint research across multiple research institutions in China and the United States. It was the two countries' most ambitious clean energy technology cooperation mechanism. It used a unique intellectual property rights protection framework among international research and development projects to encourage innovation.

== History ==
Before establishing CERC in 2009, clean energy policy and technology cooperation between the US and China were generally limited to policy dialogues and technical exchanges. These dialogues and exchanges were not well-integrated into broader climate change policy discussions between the two countries.

In January 2009, a US delegation traveled to the United States to discuss the concept of CERC with Wan Gang, China's science and technology minister. Wan became an advocate for CERC throughout CERC's existence.

In February 2009, US energy secretary Steven Chu visited China. During that visit, Wan and Chu announced the intention to establish CERC.

During the administration of United States President Obama, the US signed more bilateral agreements with China than it had during any other US administration, particularly regarding addressing climate change. The two countries signed seven clean energy agreements on November 17, 2009, during Obama's visit to China, including the agreement establishing CERC. This agreement characterized CERC as a virtual center for joint research which would be housed across multiple institutions in both China and the US. Its goals were to develop clean energy technology to diversify energy supply sources, improve energy efficiency, and improve the transition to low-carbon economies.

In November 2014, Chinese President Xi Jinping and Obama announced an agreement to extend CERC's mandate until 2020. They expressed their commitment to CERC in the same joint announcement in which their respective countries pledged new climate change targets.

During the administration of United States President Donald Trump, Wan conferred with US energy secretary Rick Perry to confirm the US desire to continue CERC. CERC engagement was lower than it had been during Obama's administration.

Nonetheless, CERC was one of the few US–China cooperation mechanism to continue during the Trump administration. CERC ended during the Joseph Biden administration. Academic Joanna I. Lewis writes, "CERC was highly subject to political headwinds, particularly in Washington, DC, which ultimately led to its dissolution."

== Significance ==
CERC was the most ambitious clean energy technology cooperation mechanism between China and the United States. The many technical exchanges on climate issues during the Obama era helped both sides of the relationship to understand better each other's emissions models and data, leading to increased mutual trust. CERC supported the research of approximately 1,100 researchers in China and the United States combined. According to an evaluation by the US Government Accountability Office, US participants gained "important benefits, such as the ability to speed progress in their research through cooperation with other US researchers and leading Chinese scientists and engineers and access to unique experimental platforms unavailable in the United States." The National Center for Science and Technology Evaluation of China (NCSTE) also evaluated CERC and described it as a "milestone initiative" that was "win-win."

To facilitate renewable energy research and development collaboration by providing more predictability to the patent process, CERC established a novel Technology Management Plan to govern intellectual property issues arising under its projects. Within CERC, owners who brought IP to CERC retained "all right, title, and interest in their background IP" and were not required to license, assign, or transfer it. The CERC Technology Management Plan required, in the event of a dispute, that the parties should attempt to reach a mutually agreeable resolution. If none could be reached, the Technology Management Plan required submission of the dispute to arbitration by the rules of the United Nations Commission on International Trade Law. No instances of arbitration were ultimately required by CERC.
