= Northeast Forestry University =

Public university in Harbin, Heilongjiang, China

Coordinates: 45.7240°N 126.6403°E

- 东北林业大学
- Motto: 学参天地 德合自然
- Motto in English: Promoting excellent learning and noble virtue
- Type: National university
- Established: 1952; 74 years ago
- Officer in charge: 张志坤
- President: 宋文龙
- Academic staff: 1,269
- Students: 28,000
- Location: Harbin, Heilongjiang, China
- Campus: Urban
- Colors: green
- Nickname: NEFU; 林大
- Website: nefu.edu.cn

Northeast Forestry University (NEFU; 东北林业大学) is a public university in Harbin, Heilongjiang, China. It is affiliated with the Ministry of Education, and co-founded by the Minister of Education, the National Forestry and Grassland Administration, and the Heilongjiang Provincial People's Government. The university is part of Project 211 and the Double First-Class Construction.

== History ==
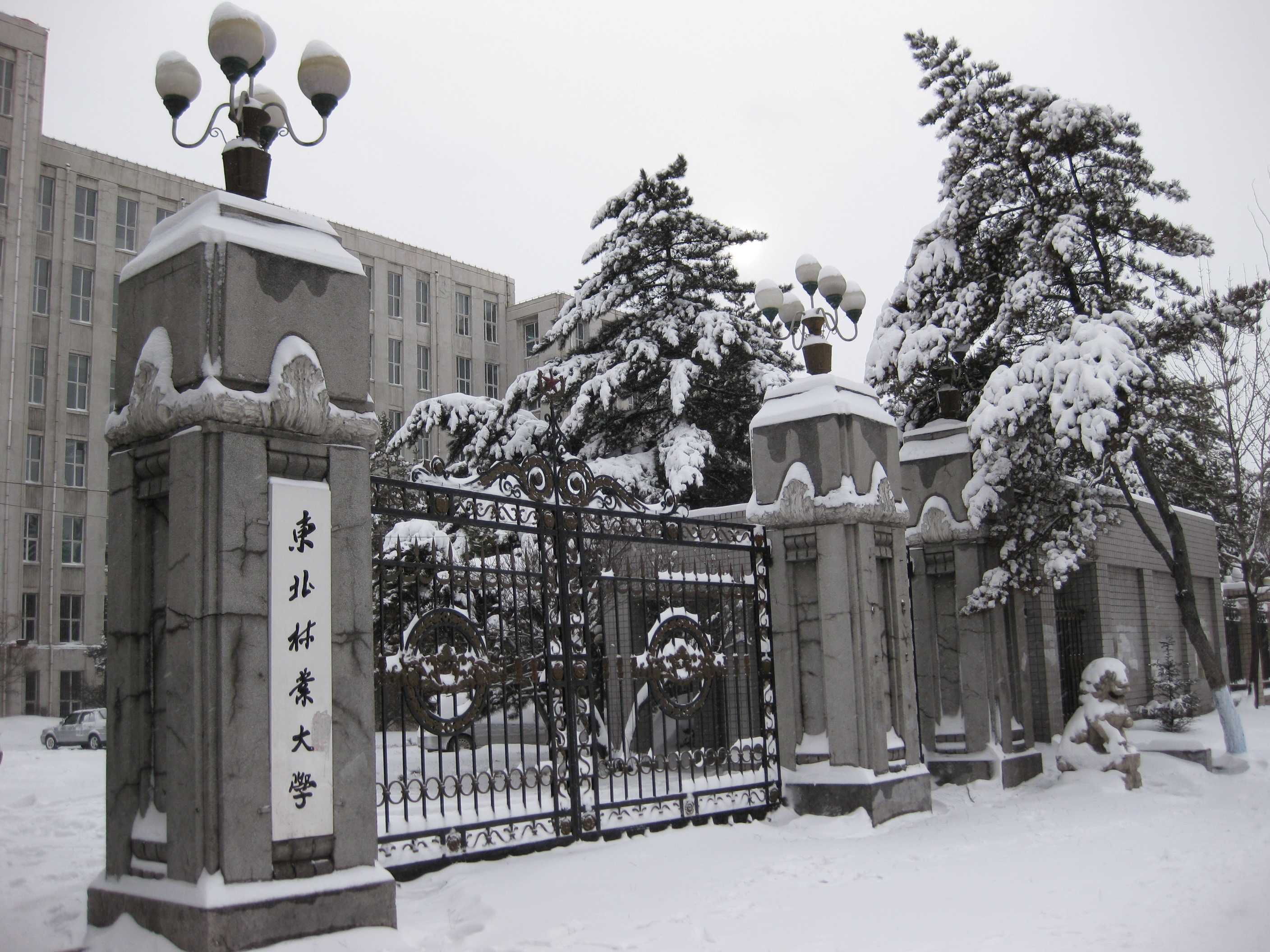
The main entrance of NEFU, the school gate since established

Founded in 1952, Northeast Forestry University (NEFU) was formed by the combination of both Zhejiang University and the Forestry Department of Northeast Agricultural College. It is one of the three oldest institutions for forestry education and research in China.

== Location ==
Northeast Forestry University is located in the city of Harbin, the center of the region with China's largest state-owned forests. Its campus covers more than 136 hectares (336 acres) with teaching buildings, scientific research laboratories, and practice sites. In addition, there are several practice centers which include the Maoershan Experimental Forestry Center (Maoershan National Forest Park) and the Liangshui Experimental Forestry Center (Liangshui National Nature Reserve). The university has a total area 33,000 hectares (81,545 acres).

The campus contains 15 dormitories and one dining hall. As a university which has more than 20,000 undergraduate students enrolled, the population density is higher than many other universities in China.

== Academics and research ==
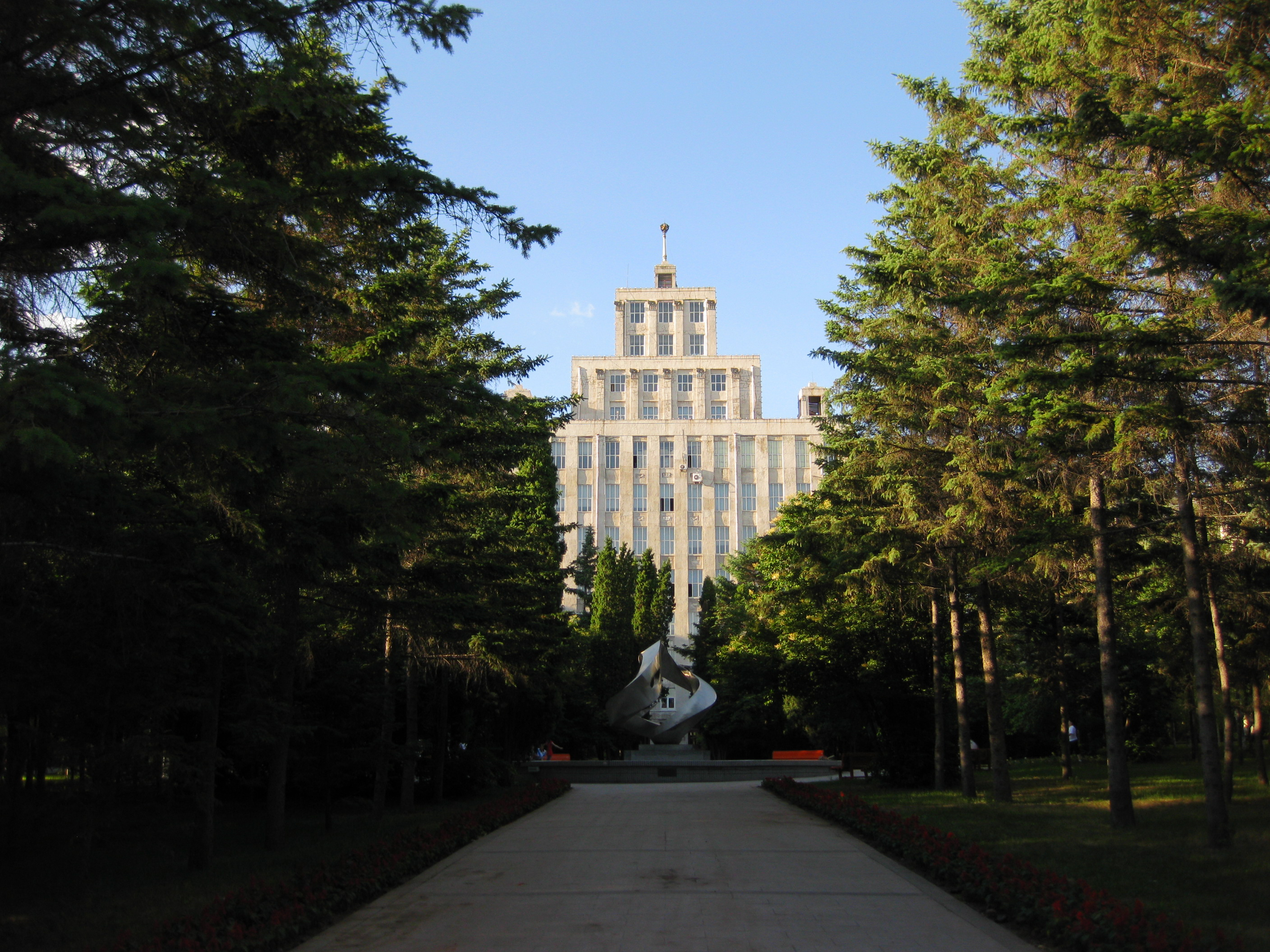
The Main Building

NEFU is a multidisciplinary university with forestry as its leading field. It offers a unique specialization in forestry engineering as well as focusing on the forestry-related aspects of agriculture, science, engineering, economy, management, liberal arts, and law. The university is composed of sixteen colleges and two departments. There are five post-doctoral scientific research programs, four first-level and thirty-two second-level doctoral degree programs. In addition, there are also ten first-level, seventy-five second-level master's degree programs, three types of special discipline master's degree programs in nine fields and fifty-seven undergraduate programs. NEFU has two national first-level key disciplines, two national second-level key disciplines, six key disciplines authorized by the State Forestry Administration, two key discipline groups authorized by Heilongjiang Province, four Heilongjiang Provincial first-level key disciplines, and fifteen Heilongjiang Provincial subordinate key disciplines. With the approval of National Planning Commission and Ministry of Education, NEFU runs the national training centers of life science and technology. In addition, NEFU operates teaching and research centers for basic sciences, particularly in biology, which are also approved by the Ministry of Education.

NEFU manages a national scientific observation key station (Maoershan forestry ecological system location station), three key laboratories of Ministry of Education, four key laboratories of the State Forestry Administration, and forty-nine research institutions. There are also nine practice sites within the school, including the Maoershan Experimental Forestry Center and Liangshui Experimental Forestry Center and 180 bases outside the school.

=== Key disciplines ===
==== First grade of national key disciplines ====
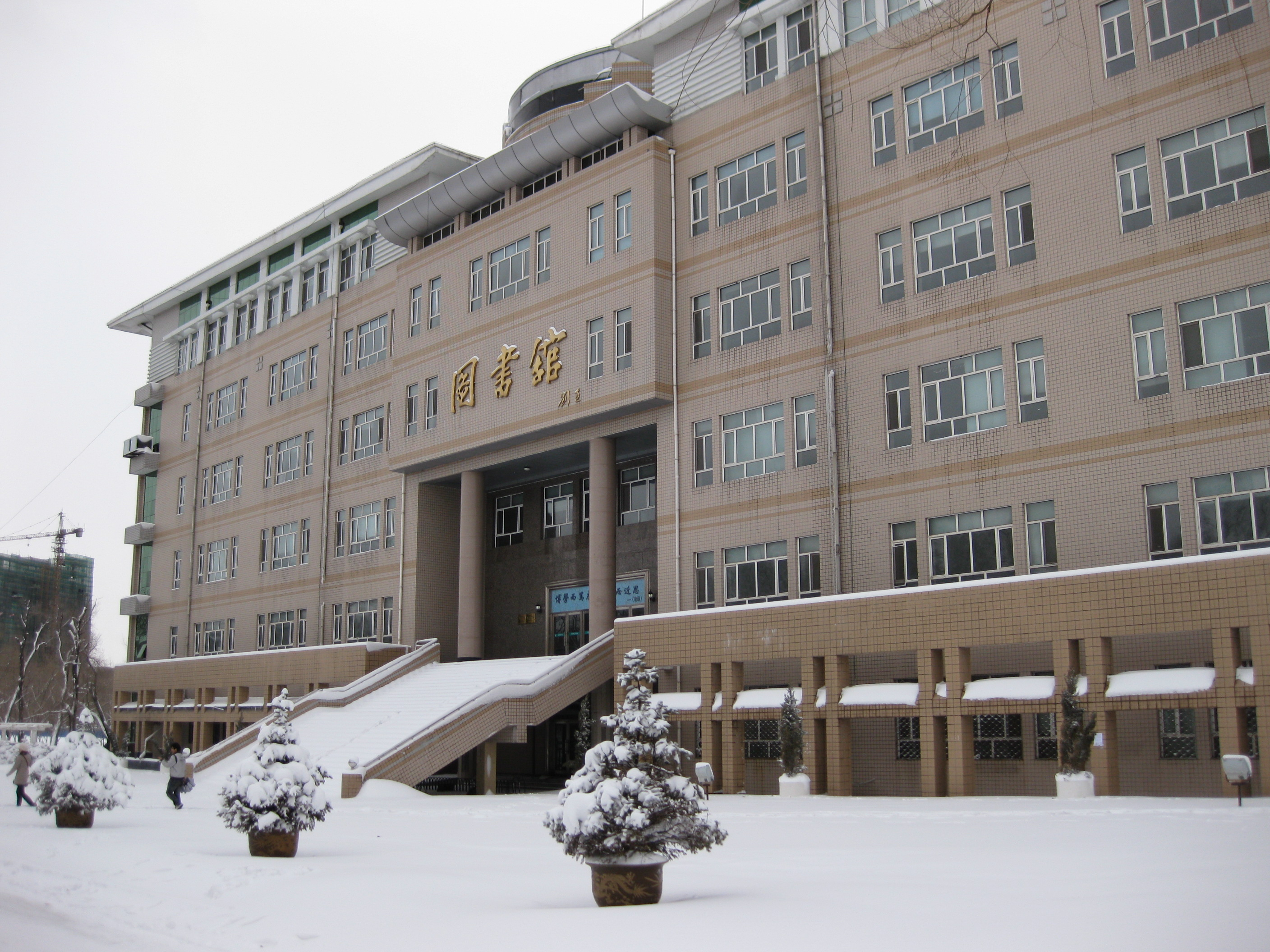
The Library

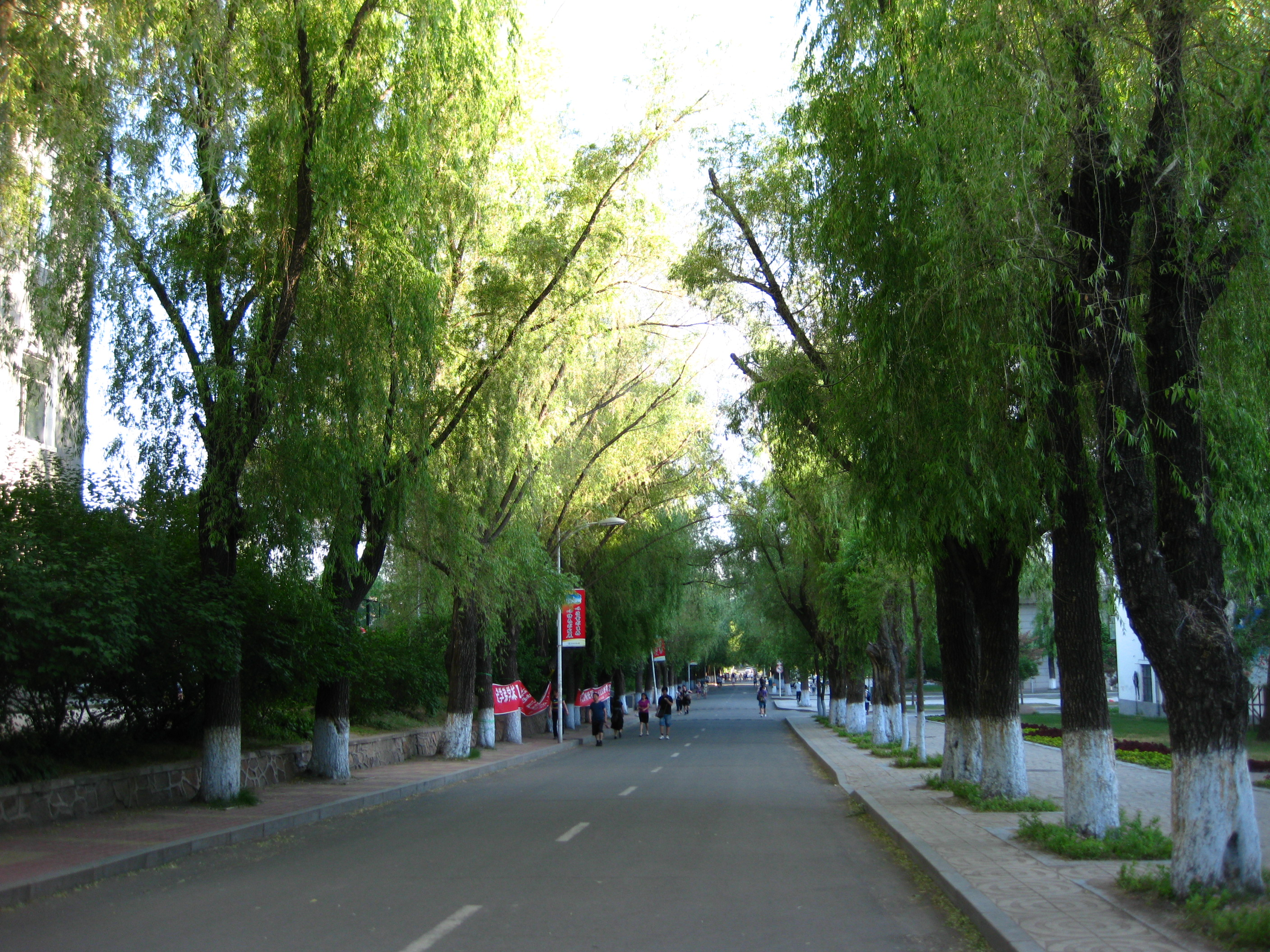
One of the main roads on campus

Forestry

- Forest Tree Genetics and Breeding
- Silviculture
- Forest Protection
- Forest Management
- Wildlife Conservation and Utilization
- Ornamental Plants and Horticulture
- Soil and Water Conservation and Desertification Controlling

Forest engineering

- Forest Engineering
- Wood Science and Technology
- Chemical Processing Engineering of Forest Products

==== Second grade of national key disciplines ====
- Botany
- Ecology

==== Key disciplines of state forestry administration ====
- Forest Tree Genetics and Breeding
- Silviculture
- Forest Management
- Ornamental Plants and Horticulture
- Chemical Processing Engineering of Forest Products
- Forestry Economics and Management

==== Key disciplines of Heilongjiang Province ====
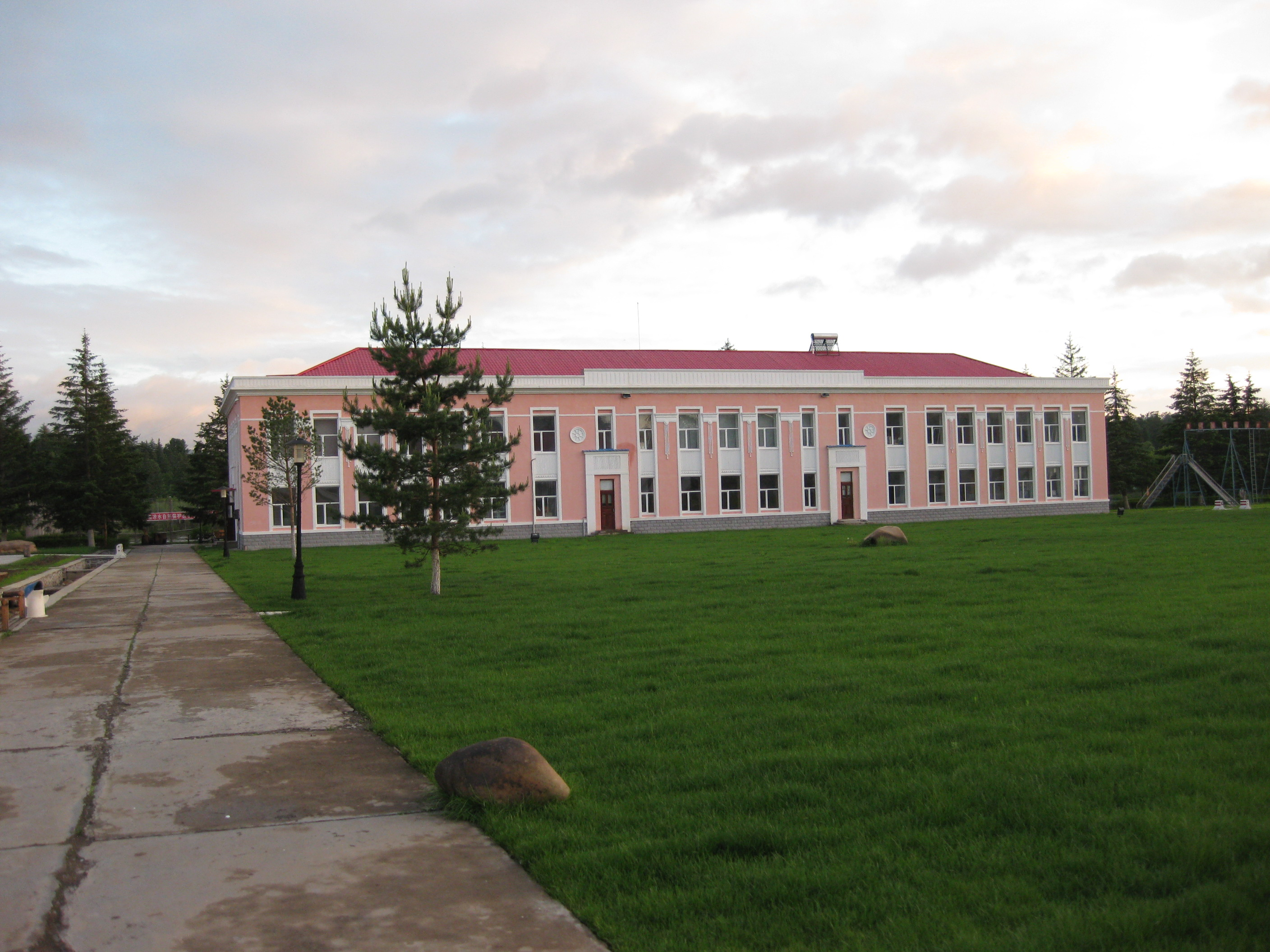
The Liangshui Experimental Forestry Center, Liangshui National Nature Reserve, Yichun, China

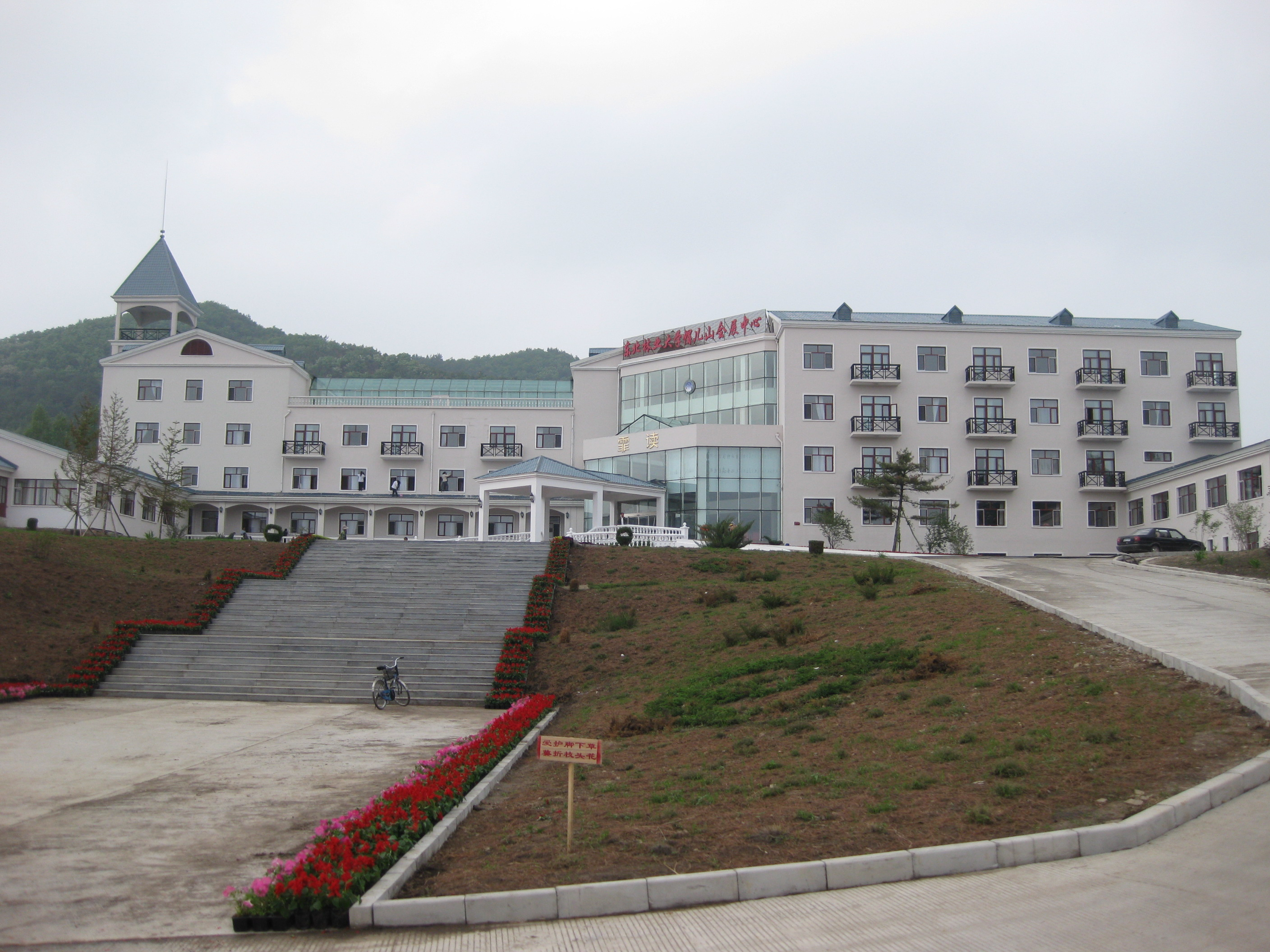
The Feidu Hotel in Maoershan Experimental Forestry Center

Provincial key discipline groups

- Forestry
- Biology Material Science and Technology

Provincial first-level key disciplines

- Biology
- Forestry
- Forest Engineering
- Agricultural and Forestry Economics and Management

Provincial second-level key disciplines

- Population, Resources and Environmental Economics
- Chemistry and Physics of Polymers
- Cell Biology
- Biochemistry and Molecular Biology
- Computer Applied Technology
- Chemical Processing Engineering of Forest Products
- Biomaterial Engineering
- Forest Tree Genetics and Breeding
- Silviculture
- Forest Management
- Horticulture
- Soil and Water Conservation and Desertification Controlling
- Biomedical Engineering
- Corporate Management
- Accounting

=== Key laboratories ===
- Key Laboratory of Forest Plant Ecology, Ministry of Education
- Key Laboratory of Bio-Based Material Science and Technology
- Key Laboratory of Forest Tree Genetic Improvement and Biotechnology, Ministry of Education

=== Research centers and institutes ===
- National Base for Cultivating People of Life Science and Technology
- National Base for Cultivating People of Base Science Research and Teaching (Biology Major)
- Maoershan Experimental Forestry Center
- Liangshui Experimental Forestry Center
- Forestry Demonstration Base of Harbin

=== Academic periodicals ===
- Journal of Northeast Forestry University
- Wildlife
- Green Financial Affairs and Accounting
- Chinese Forestry Economy
- Forest Engineering
- Journal of Forestry Research
- Bulletin of Botanical Research

== Faculty ==
The university has 1,269 full-time teachers.

=== National Academician ===
- Ma, Jianzhang 马建章; Distinguished expert of wildlife ecology and management resources.
- Li, Jian 李坚; Distinguished expert of wood science
- Song, Zhanqian 宋湛谦; Distinguished expert of forestry engineering and chemical processing of forest products
- Tang, Shouzheng 唐守正; Distinguished expert of forest management and forest statistics
- Fang, Zhiyuan 方智远; Distinguished expert of vegetable heredity breeding
- Sun, Tieheng 孙铁珩; Distinguished expert of pollution ecology and environmental engineering
- Feng, Zongwei 冯宗炜; Distinguished expert of ecology
- Xia, Xianzhu 夏咸柱; Distinguished expert of zoopathology

=== Northeast Forestry University Exchange Program ===
- The University of Adelaide, Australia
- University of Helsinki, Finland
- University of Turku, Finland
- University of Eastern Finland, Finland
- Kymenlaakson ammattikorkeakoulu, University of Applied Sciences, Finland
- The Ecole Supérieure du Bois, France
- Blagoveschensk State Pedagogical University, Russia
- Bauman Moscow State Technical University, Russia
- Ural State University, Russia
- Vladivostok State University of Economics and Service, Russia
- Ehime University, Japan
- Kagawa University, Japan
- Kitami Institute of Technology, Japan
- Kochi University, Japan
- Shimane University, Japan
- Waseda University, Japan
- Kangwon National University, South Korea
- National Chung Hsing University, Taiwan
- National Dong Hwa University, Taiwan
- National Taipei University, Taiwan
- I-Shou University, Taiwan
- Tunghai University, Taiwan
- Chinese Culture University, Taiwan
- National Pingtung University, Taiwan
- National Taichung University of Education, Taiwan
- Chaoyang University of Technology, Taiwan
- Mississippi State University, United States
- University of Colorado Denver, United States
- Purdue University Calumet, United States
- Bangor University, United Kingdom
- University of Exeter, United Kingdom

=== Chinese Program ===
Chinese Training Center of Northeast Forestry University offers courses on different levels for overseas students, including oral Chinese, listening, Chinese literature, writing, international trade, intensive reading and HSK Training. The center has basic, elementary, intermediate, and advanced-level classes, as well as short-term classes.

== Colleges and Departments ==
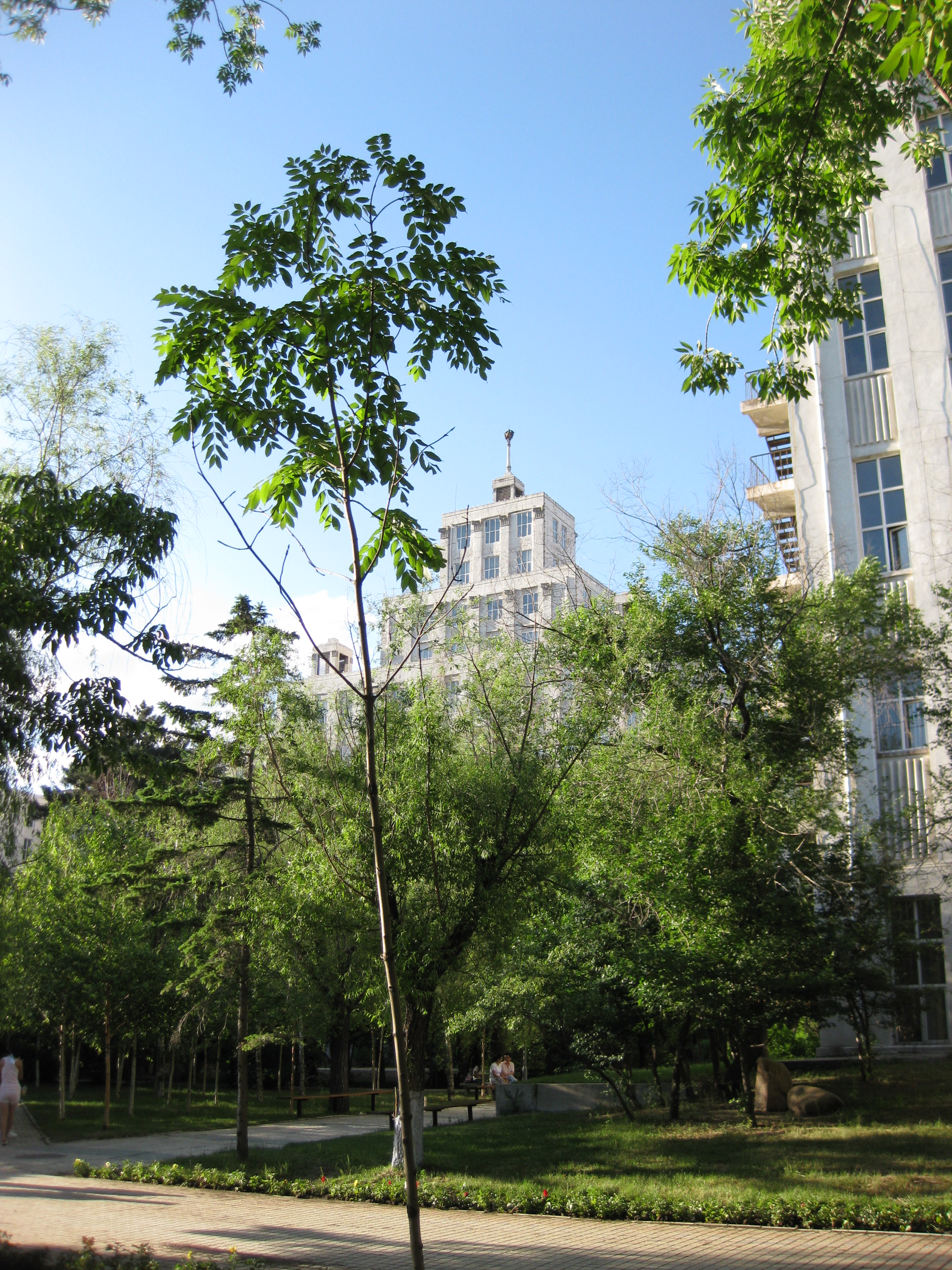
Behind the Main Building

- College of Forestry
- College of Wildlife Resources
- College of Electromechanical Engineering
- College of Humanities and Social Sciences
- College of Information and Computer Engineering
- College of Life Science
- College of Vocation and Technique
- College of Forest Economics and Management
- College of Landscape Architecture
- College of Material Science and Engineering
- College of Civil Engineering
- College of Sciences
- College of Foreign Languages
- College of Engineering and Technology
- College of Traffic
- College of Continuing Education
- Physical Education Department

== Outstanding alumni ==
Wan, Gang 万钢; Minister of Science and Technology of the People's Republic of China

Zhang, Yi 张毅; Former director of the State-owned Assets Supervision and Administration Commission

== List of presidents ==
- Liu, Chengdong 刘成栋 (1952–1963)
- Yang, Xianjin 杨衔晋 (1979–1983)
- Xiu, Guohan 修国翰 (1983–1985, 1985–1989)
- Zhu, Guoxi 朱国玺 (1990–1995)
- Li, Jian 李坚 (1996–2007)
- Yang, Chuanping 杨传平 (2007–2017)
- Li, Bin 李斌 (2017–2023)
- Song, Wenlong 宋文龙 (2023-)

== See also ==
- List of forestry universities and colleges
