= Du Jiangfeng =

Chinese physicist

- 杜江峰
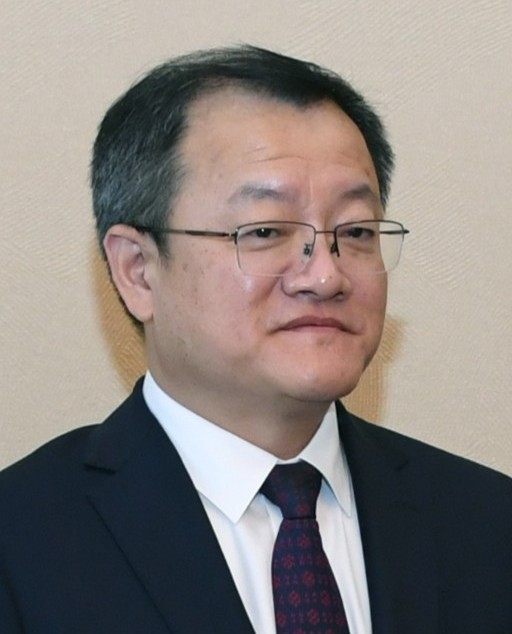
- Du in 2025

President of Zhejiang University
- In office 28 December 2022 – 25 February 2025
- Preceded by: Wu Zhaohui
- Succeeded by: Ma Yanming

Personal details
- Born: June 1969 (age 57) Wuxi, Jiangsu, China
- Party: Chinese Communist Party
- Education: University of Science and Technology of China
- Scientific career
- Fields: Quantum physics
- Workplaces: University of Science and Technology of China; Zhejiang University

Du Jiangfeng (Chinese: 杜江峰; pinyin: Dù Jiāngfēng; born June 1969) is a Chinese physicist, university administrator and politician, an academician of the Chinese Academy of Sciences, currently serving as vice minister of Education of China. He previously served as president of Zhejiang University from 2022 to 2025.

He is a member of the Chinese Communist Party (CCP). He is an alternate of the 20th Central Committee of the Chinese Communist Party.

== Biography ==
Du was born in Wuxi, Jiangsu, in June 1969. He attended Tianyi High School of Jiangsu Province (江苏省天一中学). He earned a bachelor's degree in 1990, a master's degree in 1997, and a doctor's degree in 2000, all from the University of Science and Technology of China.

After graduating in 1990, he stayed and taught at his alma mater. From 2005 to 2007, he was a researcher of Dortmund University in Germany. He was appointed as a "Changjiang Scholar" (or " Yangtze River Scholar") by the Ministry of Education of the People's Republic of China in 2008. He moved up the ranks to become deputy dean of its School of Physics in 2012 and vice president in April 2018.

On 28 December 2022, the Organization Department of the Chinese Communist Party appointed Du as president of Zhejiang University, a position at vice-ministerial level.

On 25 February 2025, Du was appointed as vice minister of Education.

== Honours and awards ==
- 2012 State Natural Science Award (Second Class) for the research on quantum computing based on nuclear spin
- October 2015 Member of the Chinese Academy of Sciences (CAS)
- 2019 Science and Technology Progress Award of the Ho Leung Ho Lee Foundation

Educational offices
Preceded by Wu Zhaohui	President of Zhejiang University; 2022–2025	Succeeded by Ma Yanming
