= Hydrogen energy vision and technology roadmap =

Chinese government plan

The Hydrogen energy vision and technology roadmap is the roadmap of China initiated by the Ministry of Science and Technology, it makes hydrogen and fuel cell technologies important thematic priorities of the S&T development plan.

== See also ==
- Hydrogen economy
