= Ma Yanming =

Chinese physicist

- 马琰铭

President of Zhejiang University
- Incumbent
- Assumed office 28 March 2025
- Preceded by: Du Jiangfeng

Personal details
- Born: September 1972 (age 53) Antu, Jilin, China
- Party: Chinese Communist Party
- Scientific career
- Education: Yanbian University (BS, MS); Jilin University (PhD)
- Fields: High-pressure physics
- Workplaces: Jilin University (2001-2025); Zhejiang University (2025-present)
- Doctoral advisor: Zou Guangtian
- Website: mym.calypso.cn

Chinese name
- Traditional Chinese: 馬琰銘
- Simplified Chinese: 马琰铭
Transcriptions
Standard Mandarin
- Hanyu Pinyin: Mǎ Yǎnmíng

Ma Yanming (born September 1972) is a Chinese physicist and an academician of the Chinese Academy of Sciences. His research area focuses on computational condensed matter physics under high-pressure conditions. He is currently the President and Deputy Party Secretary of Zhejiang University. He previously served as Vice President of Jilin University.

== Biography ==
Born in Antu County, Jilin Province in September 1972, Ma Yanming was admitted to the Department of Physics at Yanbian University in 1991, where he obtained his bachelor's and master's degrees. In 1998, he pursued further studies at the State Key Laboratory of Superhard Materials at Jilin University under the supervision of Zou Guangtian, one of the founders of high-pressure physics in China. After graduating in 2001, he remained at the university as a faculty member. He was promoted to professor in 2005. In 2011, he was appointed a Distinguished Professor under the Changjiang Scholars Program. From 2017 to 2021, he served as Dean of the School of Physics at Jilin University. In September 2021, he became Vice President of Jilin University. On 22 November 2023, he was elected as an academician of the Chinese Academy of Sciences. On 28 March 2025, he was appointed President and Deputy Party Secretary of Zhejiang University.

== Honors and awards ==
- Member of Chinese Academy of Sciences (2023)
- The second-class prize of the State Natural Science Award (2019), State Council of China
- Highly Cited Researcher (2017–2023), Clarivate Analytics
- Walter Kohn Prize (2016), International Centre for Theoretical Physics in Trieste
- China Youth Science and Technology Award (2011)
- GRC Jamieson Award (2001), International Association for High Pressure Science and Technology

Educational offices
Preceded by Du Jiangfeng	President of the Zhejiang University; 2025 - present	Incumbent
