= Wu Qidi =

Chinese politician and engineer

Wu Qidi 吴启迪
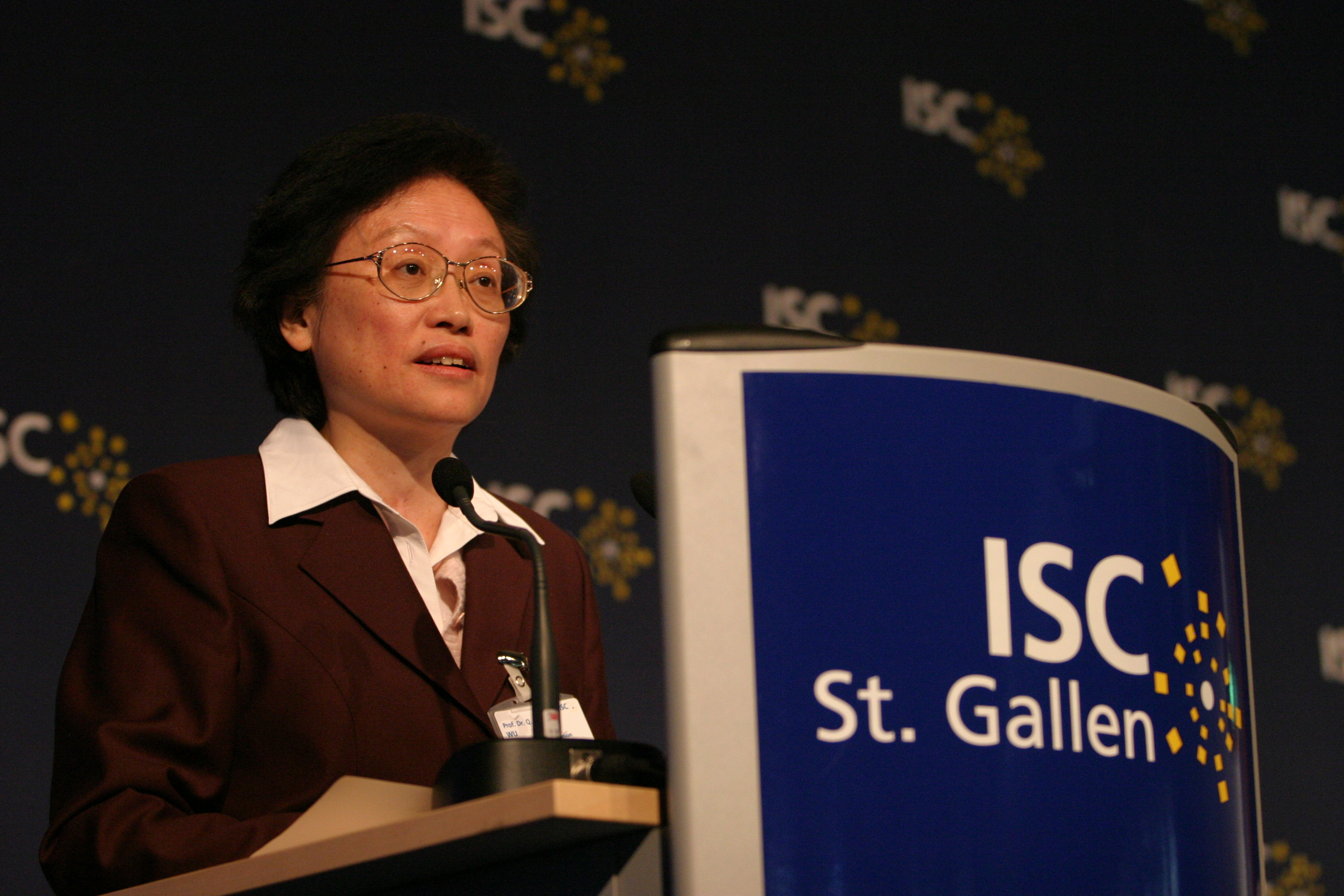

Vice-minister of Education
- In office June 2003 – 2008
- President: Hu Jintao

Vice-chairwoman of the All-China Women's Federation
- In office 2003–2008
- President: Gu Xiulian

Personal details
- Born: August 1947 (age 78) Yongjia County, Zhejiang
- Party: Chinese Communist Party
- Education: Tsinghua University (BSc); Tsinghua University (MSc); Swiss Federal Institute of Technology in Zurich (PhD)

Wu Qidi (Chinese: 吴启迪; born August 1947) is a Chinese politician and engineer. She is the president of the Shanghai Overseas Returned Scholars Association.

== Education ==
Wu completed her undergraduate degree in radio engineering at Tsinghua University in 1970. She worked as a technician in a factory making equipment for the Yunnan Central Office for telecommunications until 1975, when she moved to Beijing to become a technician in the China Electronics Standardization Institute.

In 1978, Wu resumed her studies as a master's student Tsinghua University, researching precision instruments and working as an assistant engineer. From 1981 to 1986, Wu studied for a PhD at the Swiss Federal Institute of Technology in Zurich.

== Career ==
From 1986 to 1989, Wu worked as a lecturer at Tongji University before becoming an assistant professor, then a professor. In 1993, she was made vice-president of Tongji University, before becoming president in 1995. During Wu's presidency, the number of students at Tongji increased from 27,000 to 56,000 and the funds available for research increased three-fold.

In 2002, Wu was an alternate member of the 16th National Congress of the Chinese Communist Party.

In 2003, Wu was made Vice-minister of Education, in addition to becoming a Vice-chairwoman of the All-China Women's Federation.

== Honors and awards ==
- Grand Cross of Merit of the Federal Republic of Germany (1999).
- Henry Fok Scholarship Award from MOE for Young Teachers (1988)

Educational offices
Previous: Gao Tingyao (高廷耀)	President of Tongji University; February 1995 - June 2003	Next: Wan Gang
