= Wang Zhigang =

Chinese politician (born 1957)

- 王志刚
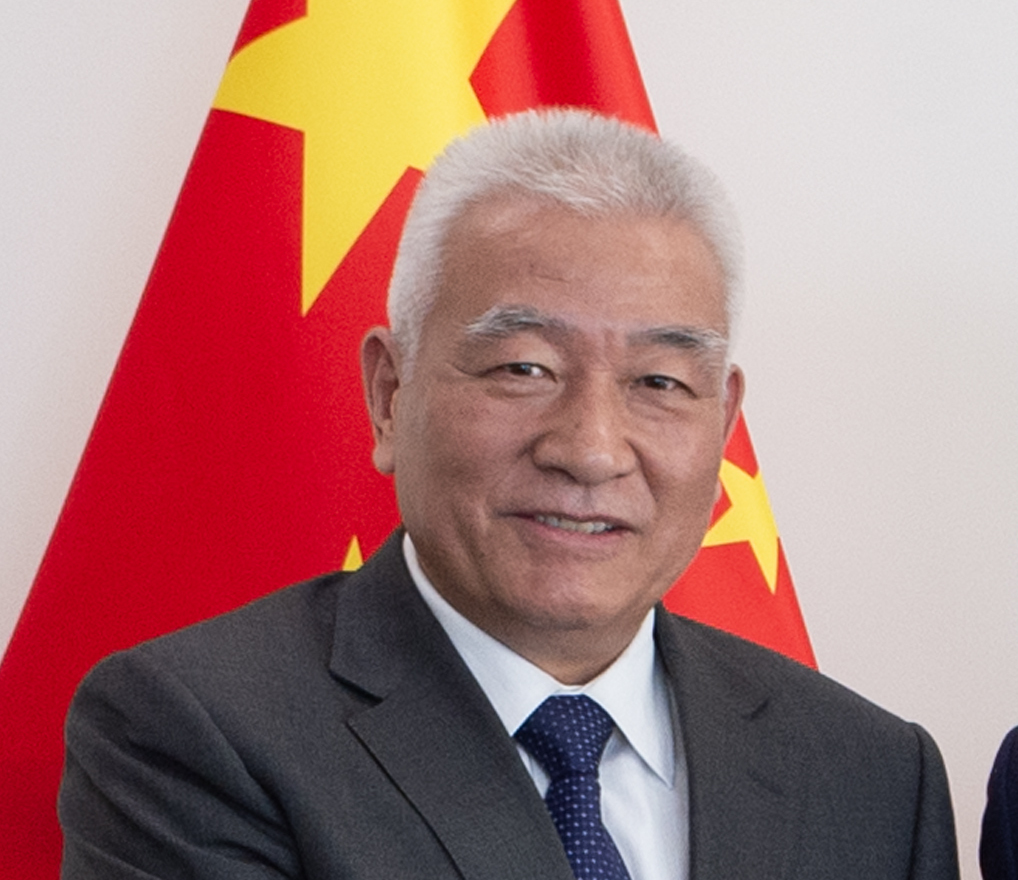
- Wang in 2023

Minister of Science and Technology
- In office 19 March 2018 – 24 October 2023
- Premier: Li Keqiang; Li Qiang
- Preceded by: Wan Gang
- Succeeded by: Yin Hejun

General Manager of China Electronics Technology Group Corporation
- In office September 2003 – April 2011
- Preceded by: Lü Xinkui (吕新奎)
- Succeeded by: Liu Liehong (刘烈宏)

Personal details
- Born: October 1957 (age 68–69) Dingyuan County, Anhui, China
- Party: Chinese Communist Party
- Education: Xidian University; Central Party School of the Chinese Communist Party

Wang Zhigang (Chinese: 王志刚; born October 1957) is a Chinese information engineer who served as the Minister of Science and Technology from 2018 to 2023. Previously, he served as general manager of China Electronics Technology Group Corporation, a state-owned military industrial complex.

== Biography ==
Wang was born in Dingyuan County, Anhui in October 1957. In January 1976, during the late Down to the Countryside Movement, he was a sent-down youth in Changshan Commune of Chuzhou. In October 1978 he was accepted to Xidian University and graduated in July 1982.

After graduation, he assigned to the Ministry of Electronics Industry as an engineer. He spent 14 years working there before serving as general manager of China National Software. He joined the Chinese Communist Party in December 1986. In February 1999 he was promoted to become the vice-president of CAEIT, a position he held until January 2002. In January 2002 he became the deputy general manager of China Electronics Technology Group Corporation, rising to general manager in September 2003. In April 2011, he was appointed vice-minister of Science and Technology, he remained in that position until March 2018, when he was elevated to the Minister position.

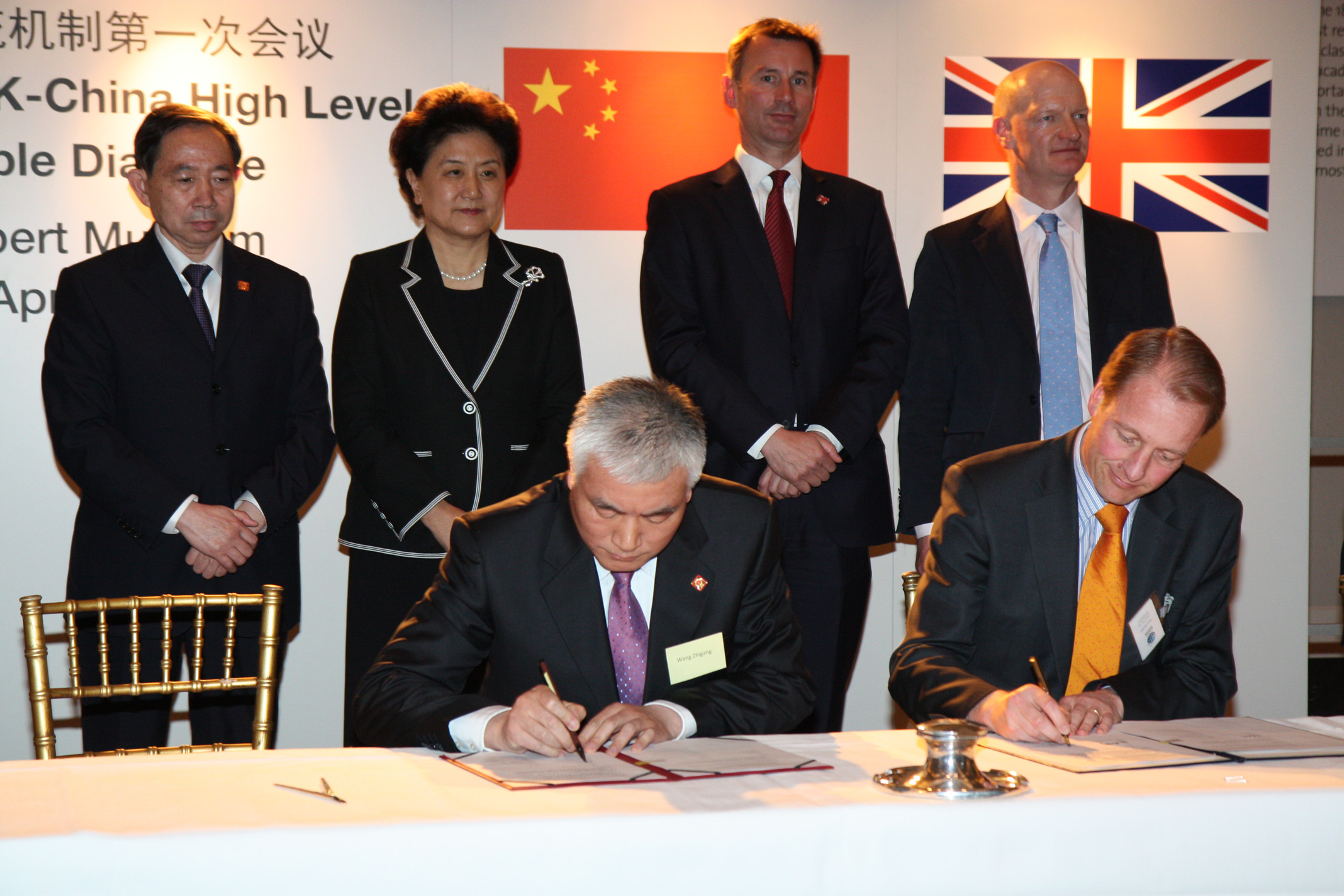
Wang Zhigang and Paul Boyle in London, on 16 April 2012.

He was a member of the 19th CPC Central Committee and the 18th CPC Central Committee. He was also a member of the 19th National Congress of the Chinese Communist Party.

On 7 October 2023, he was succeeded by Yin Hejun as the Communist Party secretary of the Ministry of Science and Technology. On 24 October, he was succeeded by Yin as the minister of Science and Technology.

Business positions
| Preceded by Lü Xinkui (吕新奎) | General Manager of China Electronics Technology Group Corporation; 2003–2011 | Succeeded by Liu Liehong (刘烈宏) |
Government offices
| Preceded by Wan Gang | Minister of Science and Technology; 2018–2023 | Succeeded by Yin Hejun |
