= Minister of Science and Technology (China) =

Minister of the People's Republic of China

Minister of Science and Technology of the People's Republic of China
- 中华人民共和国科学技术部部长
- National Emblem of China

- Flag of China

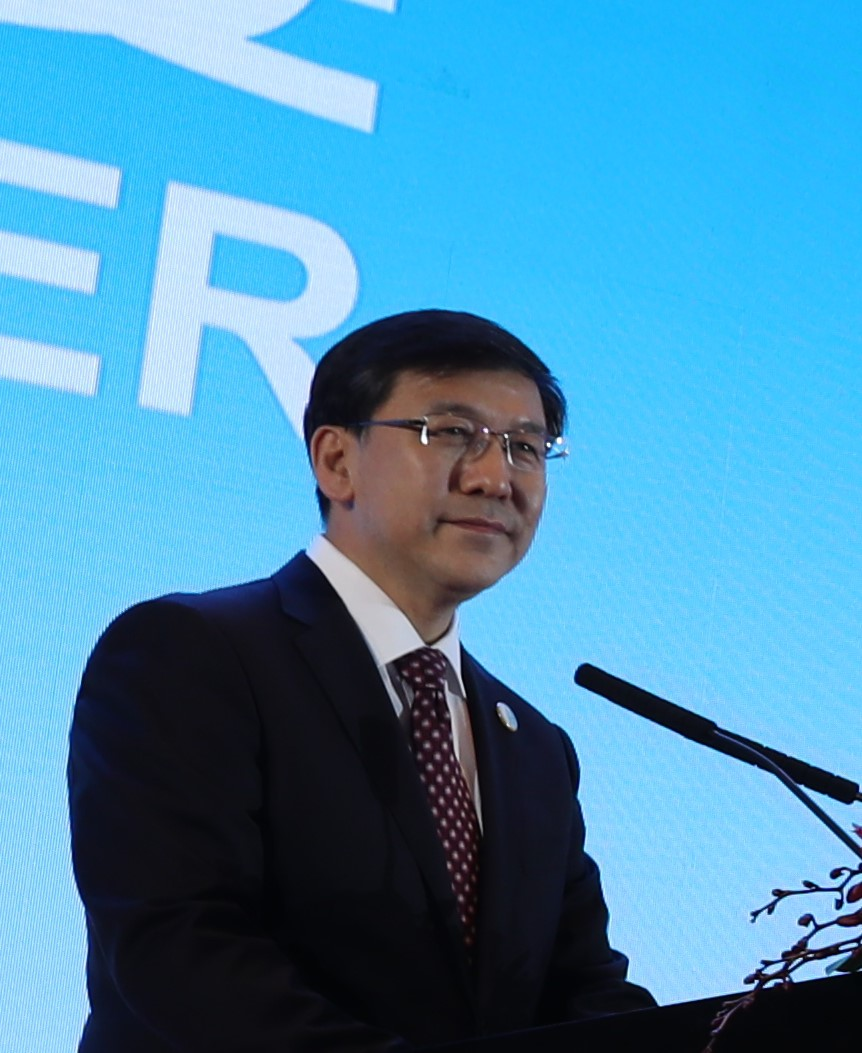
- Incumbent; Yin Hejun since 24 October 2023
- Ministry of Science and Technology
- Status: Provincial and ministerial-level official
- Member of: Plenary Meeting of the State Council
- Seat: Ministry of Science and Technology Building, Haidian District, Beijing
- Nominator: Premier (chosen within the Chinese Communist Party)
- Appointer: President; with the confirmation of the National People's Congress or its Standing Committee
- Formation: 23 November 1958; 67 years ago
- First holder: Nie Rongzhen
- Deputy: Vice Minister of Science and Technology

The minister of science and technology of the People's Republic of China is the head of the Ministry of Science and Technology of the People's Republic of China and a member of the State Council. Within the State Council, the position is fifth in order of precedence. The minister is responsible for leading the ministry, presiding over its meetings, and signing important documents related to the ministry. Officially, the minister is nominated by the premier of the State Council, who is then approved by the National People's Congress or its Standing Committee and appointed by the president.

The current minister is Yin Hejun, who concurrently serves as the Chinese Communist Party Committee Secretary of the ministry.

== List of ministers ==
No.	Name	Took office	Left office	Ref.
Director of State Science and Technology Commission
1	Nie Rongzhen	23 November 1958	June 1970	
Post abolished
2	Fang Yi	September 1977	20 September 1984	
3	Song Jian	20 September 1984	18 March 1998	
Minister of Science and Technology
4	Zhu Lilan	18 March 1998	28 February 2001	
5	Xu Guanhua	28 February 2001	27 April 2007	
6	Wan Gang	27 April 2007	19 March 2018	
7	Wang Zhigang	19 March 2018	24 October 2023	
8	Yin Hejun	24 October 2023	Incumbent	
