= State Administration of Foreign Experts Affairs =

Government agency in the People's Republic of China

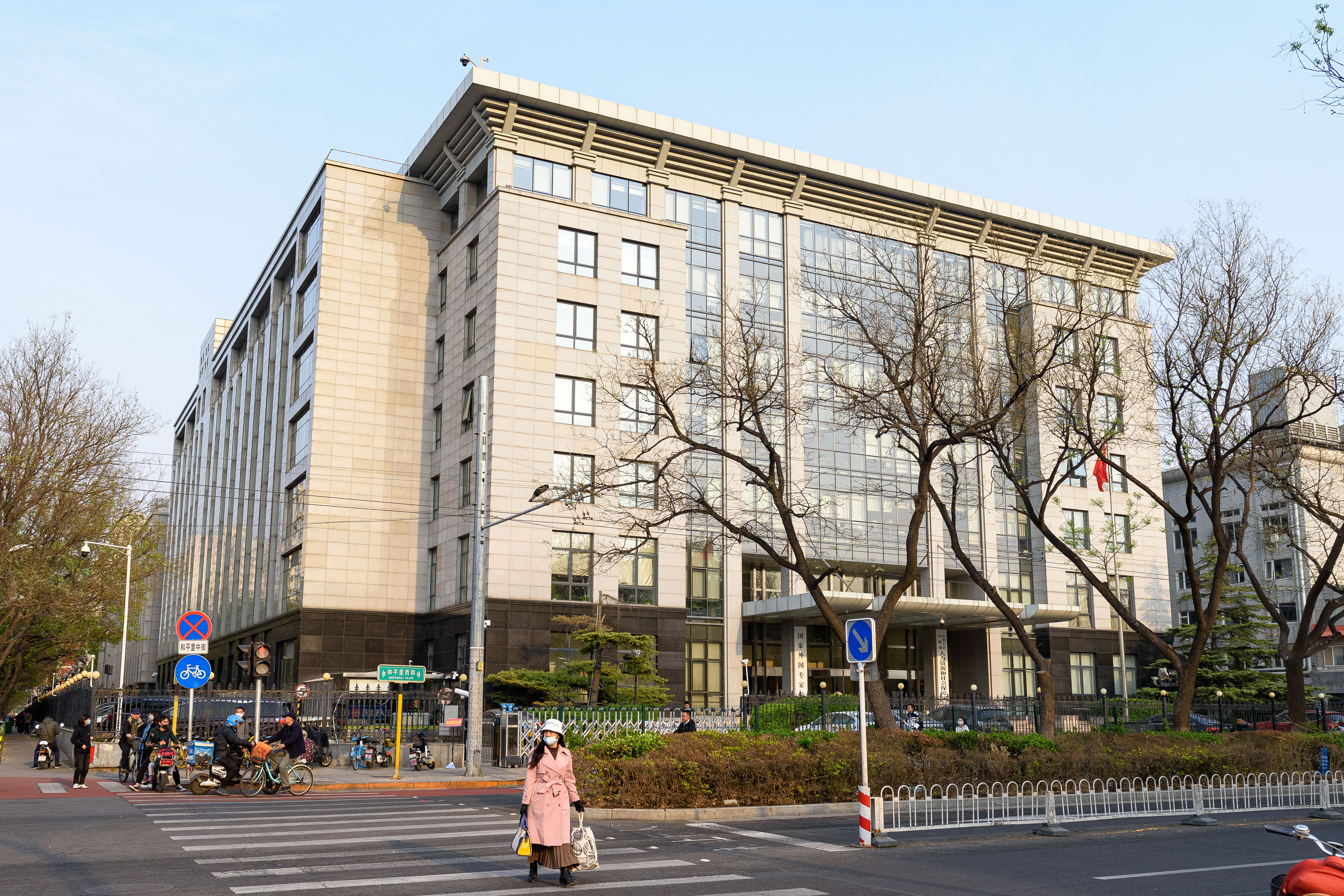
The sign of SAFEA at the Ministry of Human Resources and Social Security in 2024

The State Administration of Foreign Experts Affairs (SAFEA; Chinese: 国家外国专家局; pinyin: Guójiā Wàiguó Zhuānjiā Jú) is an external name used by China's Ministry of Human Resources and Social Security. SAFEA was previously its own agency of the government of the People's Republic of China (PRC) that operated under the State Council and the Ministry of Human Resources and Social Security. It was responsible for recruiting foreign experts outside of mainland China - including Taiwan and the special administrative regions - for work in the PRC, and managing the training of Chinese nationals outside of the PRC. It was headquartered in Zhongguancun, Haidian District, Beijing.

== History ==
SAFEA founded in 1956 and abolished in March 2018, when its functions were absorbed by the Ministry of Science and Technology (MOST) as part of the deepening the reform of the Party and state institutions. The SAFEA name was retained to interact with foreign parties. The name was transferred to the Ministry of Human Resources and Social Security in March 2023 as part of the plan on reforming Party and state institutions.

== Recruitment ==
The fields targeted for foreign recruitment included the economy, technology, management, education, engineering, science, culture, and healthcare. Foreigners usually worked in foreign invested joint-ventures, private industry, state-owned enterprises and public construction projects.

== Programs and organizations supervised ==
- Thousand Talents Plan (TTP)
- China International Talent Exchange Foundation (CITEF)
- China Association for International Exchange of Personnel (CAIEP)
- China Services International
- Conference on International Exchange of Professionals

== Partnerships ==
SAFEA has had partnerships with universities and professional bodies in several countries, including:

- University of Maryland, College Park
- University of Wisconsin–Madison
- Project Management Institute

== Reaction ==
According to the 1999 Cox Report, SAFEA's CAIEP is "one of several organizations set up by the PRC for illicit technology transfer through contacts with Western scientists and engineers." In March 2022, a federal jury convicted a man of fraudulently obtaining U.S. visas for CAIEP employees.

A 2019 report by the United States Senate Homeland Security Permanent Subcommittee on Investigations stated that SAFEA's contracts with foreign experts "include provisions that violate U.S. standards of research integrity, place TTP members in compromising legal and ethical positions, and undermine fundamental U.S. scientific norms of transparency, reciprocity, and integrity."

SAFEA has been the subject of espionage investigations. In 2010, Noshir Gowadia was convicted for selling classified information, primarily regarding the Northrop Grumman B-2 Spirit, to a SAFEA official. SAFEA has been reported to operate nominally private front organizations such as Virginia-based Triway Enterprises.

== See also ==
- Thousand Talents Plan
- Industrial espionage
- Friendship Award (winners are selected by the SAFEA)
