= Yin Hejun =

Chinese politician and engineer (born 1963)

- 阴和俊
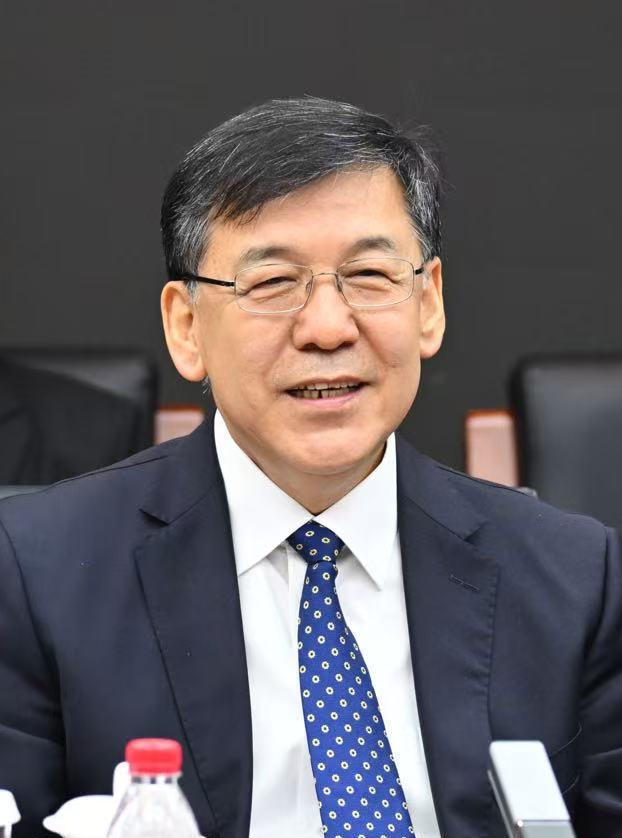
- Yin in 2025

Minister of Science and Technology
- Incumbent
- Assumed office 24 October 2023
- Premier: Li Qiang
- Preceded by: Wang Zhigang

Communist Party Secretary of the Ministry of Science and Technology
- Incumbent
- Assumed office 7 October 2023
- General Secretary: Xi Jinping
- Minister: Wang Zhigang
- Preceded by: Wang Zhigang

Vice President of the Chinese Academy of Sciences
- In office December 2020 – October 2023
- President: Hou Jianguo
- Preceded by: Hou Jianguo
- Succeeded by: Wu Zhaohui

Personal details
- Born: 14 January 1963 (age 63) Gujiao County, Shanxi, China
- Party: Chinese Communist Party (since 1983)
- Education: Taiyuan University of Technology; Xidian University; Chinese Academy of Sciences

Chinese name
- Simplified Chinese: 阴和俊
- Traditional Chinese: 陰和俊
Transcriptions
Standard Mandarin
- Hanyu Pinyin: Yin Hejun

Yin Hejun (Chinese: 阴和俊; born 14 January 1963) is a Chinese politician and engineer who is currently the minister of Science and Technology and the Chinese Communist Party (CCP) secretary of the Ministry of Science and Technology. He was previously also a vice president of the Chinese Academy of Sciences.

== Early life ==
Yin was born in Gujiao County (now Gujiao), Shanxi, on 14 January 1963. He graduated from Taiyuan Institute of Technology (now Taiyuan University of Technology) in 1983 and Xidian University in 1989. He joined the Chinese Communist Party (CCP) in June 1983. He earned his doctorate degree in electromagnetic field and microwave technology from the Institute of Electronics, Chinese Academy of Sciences in 1995.

== Career ==
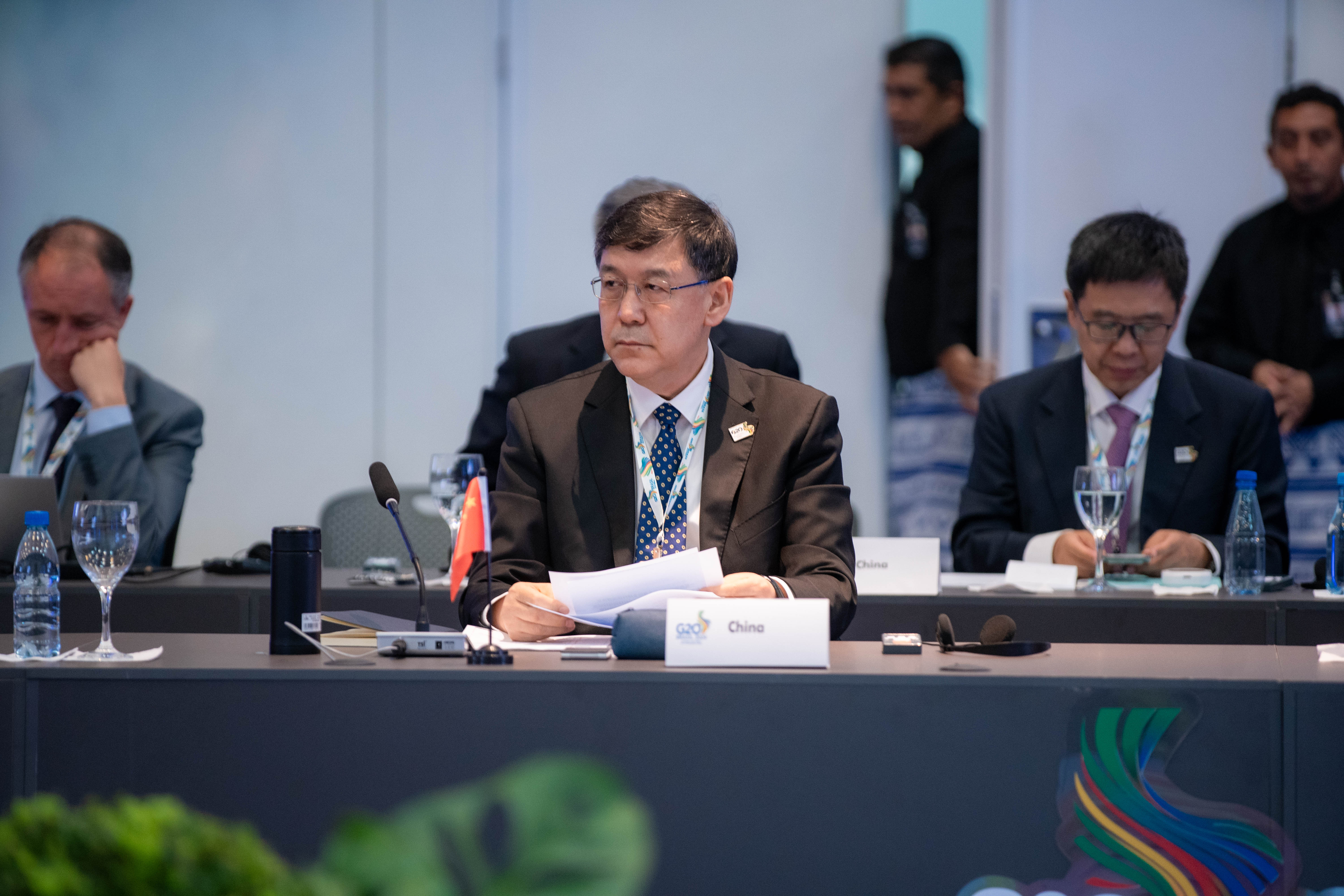
Yin Hejun at the 2024 G20 Research and Innovation Ministerial Meeting in Brazil

After graduating in March 1995, Yin stayed and worked at the Institute of Electronics, Chinese Academy of Sciences, where he was promoted to executive deputy director in August 1999 and to director in August 2001. After a short term as director of the High Technology Research and Development Bureau of the Chinese Academy of Sciences in January 2008, he rose to become vice president of the Chinese Academy of Sciences.

In November 2015, Yin was transferred to the central government and appointed vice minister of Science and Technology.

In March 2017, Yin was admitted to member of the Standing Committee of the CCP Beijing Municipal Committee, the capital city's top authority. He was vice mayor of Beijing in April 2017, in addition to serving as party secretary of the CCP Zhongguancun Management Committee.

In October 2018, Yin was made deputy party secretary of the neighboring city Tianjin and was admitted to member of the Standing Committee of the CCP Tianjin Municipal Committee, the city's top authority.

In November 2020, Yin was recalled to the Chinese Academy of Sciences and appointed vice president (ministerial level) for the second time.

He was a representative of the 19th National Congress of the Chinese Communist Party and an alternate of the 19th Central Committee of the Chinese Communist Party. He is a representative of the 20th National Congress of the Chinese Communist Party and a member of the 20th Central Committee of the Chinese Communist Party.

On 7 October 2023, he was appointed by the CCP Organization Department as the Communist Party secretary of the Ministry of Science and Technology, succeeding Wang Zhigang. On 24 October, he was appointed as the minister of Science and Technology.

Academic offices
Preceded by Xiang Libin	Director of the High Technology Research and Development Bureau of the Chinese Academy of Sciences; 2006–2008	Succeeded by Tian Jing
Preceded by Hou Jianguo	Vice President of the Chinese Academy of Sciences; 2020–2023	Succeeded by Wu Zhaohui
Party political offices
Preceded by Huai Jinpeng	Specifically-designated Deputy Communist Party Secretary of Tianjin; 2018–2020	Succeeded by Jin Xiangjun
Government offices
Preceded by Wang Zhigang	Minister of Science and Technology; 2023–present	Incumbent
