= Ministry of Science and Technology (China) =

Government ministry of the People's Republic of China

Ministry of Science and Technology of the People's Republic of China
- 中华人民共和国科学技术部; Zhōnghuá Rénmín Gònghéguó Kēxué Jìshùbù
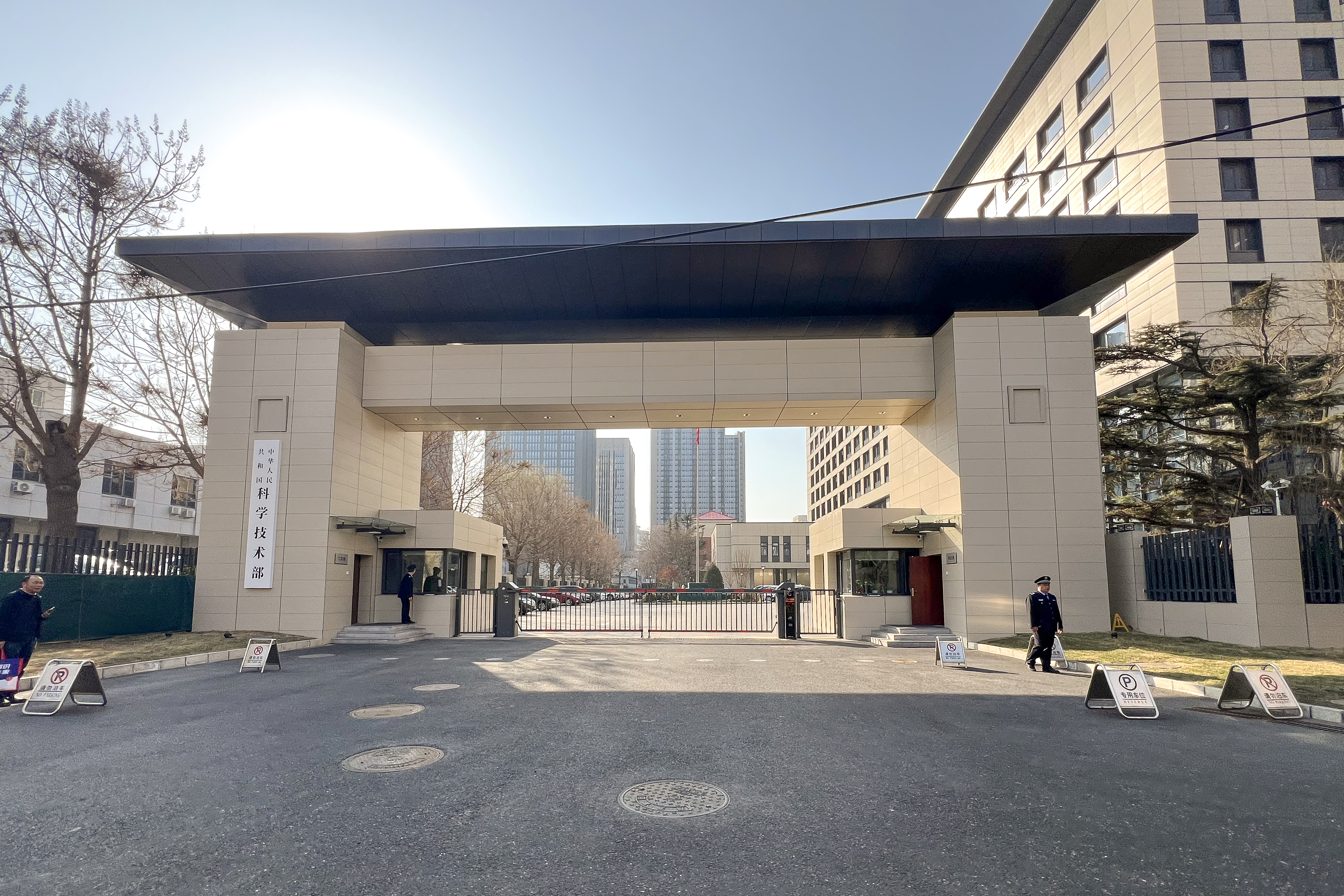
- Ministry headquarters

Agency overview
- Formed: 1958; 68 years ago (as Commission); 1998; 28 years ago (as Ministry)
- Preceding agency: State Science and Technology Commission
- Type: Constituent Department of the State Council (cabinet-level executive department)
- Jurisdiction: Government of China
- Headquarters: Beijing
- Annual budget: $61.7 billion (2026)
- Minister responsible: Yin Hejun, Minister
- Parent agency: Central Science and Technology Commission
- Website: en.most.gov.cn

The Ministry of Science and Technology is the executive department of the Central Science and Technology Commission, which coordinates science and technology activities in the country. The office is located in Xicheng District, Beijing.

The ministry is responsible for formulating guidelines and related policies for science and technology in China development and promoting basic and special research on science and technology.

== History ==
In 1956, the People's Republic of China formed an ad hoc Science Planning Commission, followed by the State Technology Commission. These two bodies merged to form the State Science and Technology Commission in 1958. The commission mostly ceased to function during the Cultural Revolution, but was revived in late 1977.

The commission was renamed to the Ministry of Science and Technology of the People's Republic of China at the 9th National People's Congress in 1998.

In 2018, the Ministry of Science and Technology was approved for restructuring at the National People's Congress as part of the deepening the reform of the Party and state institutions. The most significant departmental adjustment was the merger of the National Natural Science Foundation of China (NSFC) into the Ministry of Science and Technology. The NSFC is a semi-autonomous research funding agency that provided about $4.7 billion in funding to 120,000 research projects in 2017. In addition, the State Administration of Foreign Experts Affairs (SAFEA) was also merged into the Ministry of Science and Technology. The merger of this department reflected China's intention to invest more in global research cooperation.

In 2023, the Ministry was further reformed as part of the plan on reforming Party and state institutions, with several responsibilities transferred to other departments. The Ministry would no longer take part in evaluating and managing specific research projects, instead playing a mainly supervisory and guiding role, as well as overseeing the implementation of scientific research projects and evaluating their results. Additionally, several organizations under the Ministry were transferred to other departments; the SAFEA was transferred to the Ministry of Human Resources and Social Security, the China Rural Technology Development Center was transferred to the Ministry of Agriculture and Rural Affairs, the China Biotechnology Development Center was transferred to the National Health Commission, and the China Agenda 21 Management Center and the High Technology Research and Development Center were placed under the National Natural Science Foundation of China.

== Cooperation ==
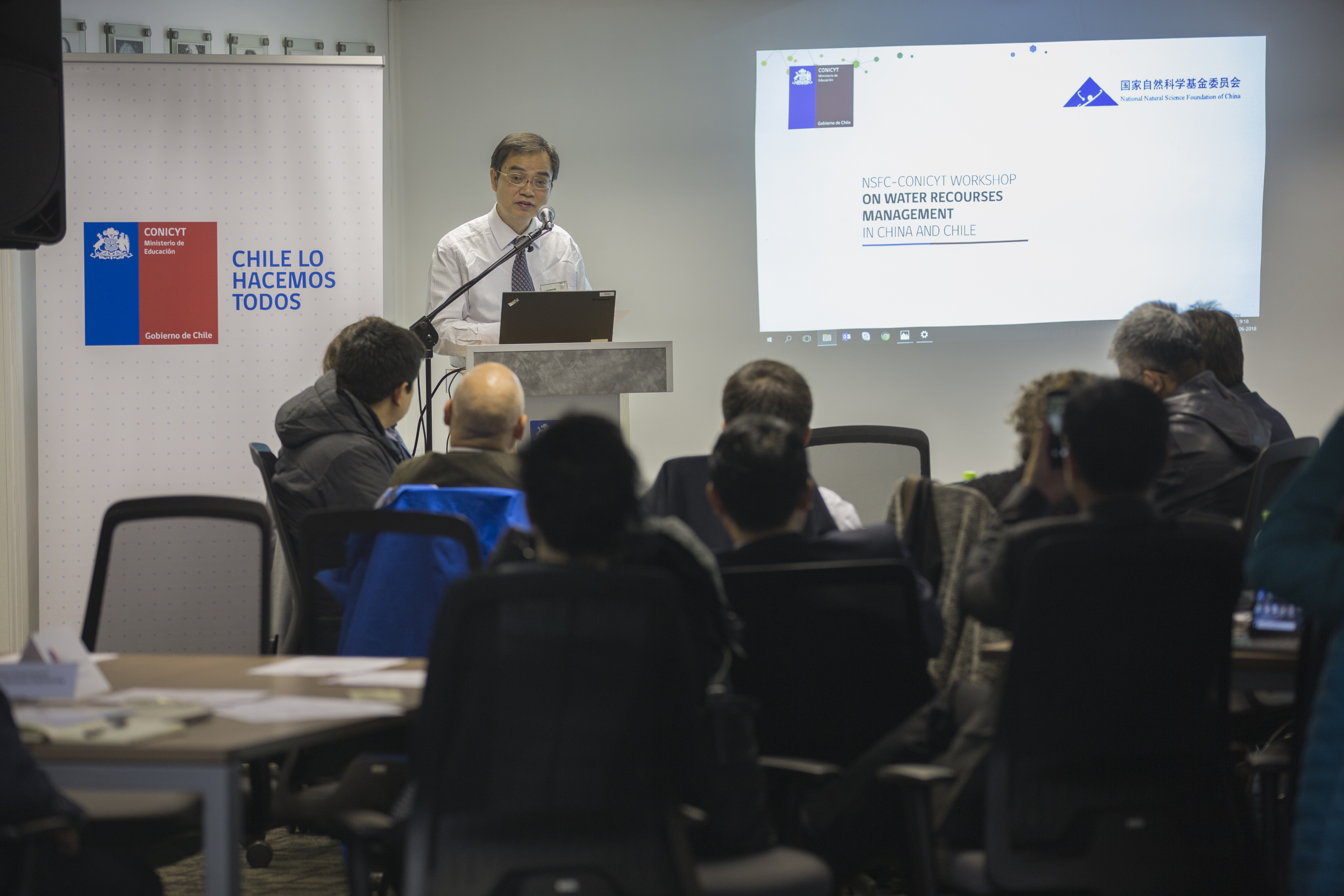
Cooperation between MOST and Chile

=== The United Nations (UN) ===
In December 2017, the Ministry of Science and Technology of China and the United Nations Department of Economic and Social Affairs (UN DESA) reached an agreement with the goal of strengthening knowledge sharing, capacity building and cooperation in sustainable development among countries. In addition, Mr. Liu Zhenmin, Deputy Secretary-General of the United Nations Department of Economic and Social Affairs, said that DESA and MOST signed a memorandum of understanding to encourage developing countries to conduct joint research in the field of green technology.

=== The World Academy of Sciences (TWAS) ===
In July 2019, TWAS Executive Director Romain Murenzi held talks with Wang Zhigang, Minister of MOST, to discuss issues such as jointly advancing scientific development in the global South. Murenzi said that the cooperative relationship between China and TWAS began 35 years ago at the beginning of TWAS establishment, and proposed to strengthen more scientific exchanges and cooperation with the Ministry of Science and Technology of China in the future.

=== European Union (EU) ===
In 2009, the Chinese Ministry of Science and Technology established a scientific cooperation program with the European Commission (CE), with the goal of conducting joint projects in scientific research areas of mutual interest. On December 16, 2015, the Ministry of Science and Technology of China launched a call for proposals. MOST will provide 200 million RMB annually to support the cooperation between China and European partners in various fields. The main supported scientific research fields are food, agriculture, biotechnology, information technology, aerospace, energy, health, etc.

=== Australian Government ===
==== The Australia-China Science and Research Fund (ACSRF) ====
This fund is jointly managed by the Ministry of Science and Technology of China and the Australian government, and mainly supports strategic scientific and technological cooperation between Australia and China. The priority research fields supported by ACSRF are the fields of food and agriculture, health technology, and renewable energy. ACSRF will also fund the establishment of joint research centers, hold special scientific lectures and conduct exchange programs for young scientists.

==== Queensland Government ====
The Queensland government was the first state in Australia to sign a memorandum of understanding with the Chinese Ministry of Science and Technology, originally signed in 2008 and renewed in 2014. It covers cooperation in the fields of renewable energy technology, environment, advanced materials, nanotechnology, agriculture, etc.

=== The National Research Council Canada ===
In February 2016, representatives from the National Research Council of Canada and MOST signed a letter of intent to support collaboration and funding in scientific and technological innovation. Vice President of the Industrial Research Assistance Program at the National Research Council of Canada Mr. Bogdan Ciobanu said that this agreement provides channels for Canadian Small and medium-sized enterprises to cooperate, fund, and promote with their Chinese counterparts and explain that this partnership will increase the global presence of Canadian companies.

=== Innovation Fund Denmark ===
In 2020, MOST and Innovation Fund Denmark carried out bilateral cooperation on sustainable city development solutions. In this project, Innovation Fund Denmark will allocate 15 million Danish krone, and MOST will allocate 20 million RMB to support four to five joint innovation research projects. The background of this cooperation is that both parties want to contribute to sustainable urban development, and the priority areas for funding are energy storage and smart city.

== Supported projects ==
=== Chronic kidney disease survey ===
The survey is a nationwide public health survey supported by the Ministry of Science and Technology of China, and a total of 50,500 adults were invited to conduct the survey. The background of this survey is that the prevalence of chronic kidney disease in developing countries is relatively high, but there is no such related survey in China. To specifically analyse the factors related to chronic kidney disease, this survey uses logistic regression.

The survey concluded that the estimated prevalence of chronic kidney disease in China is similar to that in developed countries such as the United States and Norway. However, the prevalence of stage 3 and stage 4 chronic kidney disease is lower than the prevalence in the United States and Norway.

Researchers speculate that the prevalence of hypertension and diabetes in China has increased rapidly in the past 20 years. Therefore, the prevalence of stage 3 and stage 4 chronic kidney disease will gradually increase in the next decade. The final result shows that chronic kidney disease has become one of the most important public health problems in China, and it needs more attention in rural areas with the poor economy.

=== Plasma Surface Metallurgy project ===
The MOST has corresponding support in material research in 2018. The main research direction of this project is the plasma surface metallurgy technique. The research has developed an alloy material that can withstand the requirements of industrial applications above 800 °C and has oxidation resistance. This alloy material will contribute to China's aerospace industry and automotive industry.

=== Coal energy development ===
Production, consumption, net imports and exports of coal for China

Since 2005, the Ministry of Science and Technology of China has formulated the main development direction of China's medium and long-term national energy is the new coal chemical industry, to reduce environmental pollution and dependence on imported crude oil.

==== Before 2005 ====
Most of China's energy was produced by burning coal. This method of coal utilization would produce a lot of harmful gases, which directly led to the world's top ten polluted cities all in China, and huge economic losses. Since 2005, under the strategy of the Ministry of Science and Technology, the energy consumption and industrial scale of the coal chemical industry have increased year by year. This strategy is expected to reduce China's air pollution and efficient utilization of coal and other issues.

==== After 2010 ====
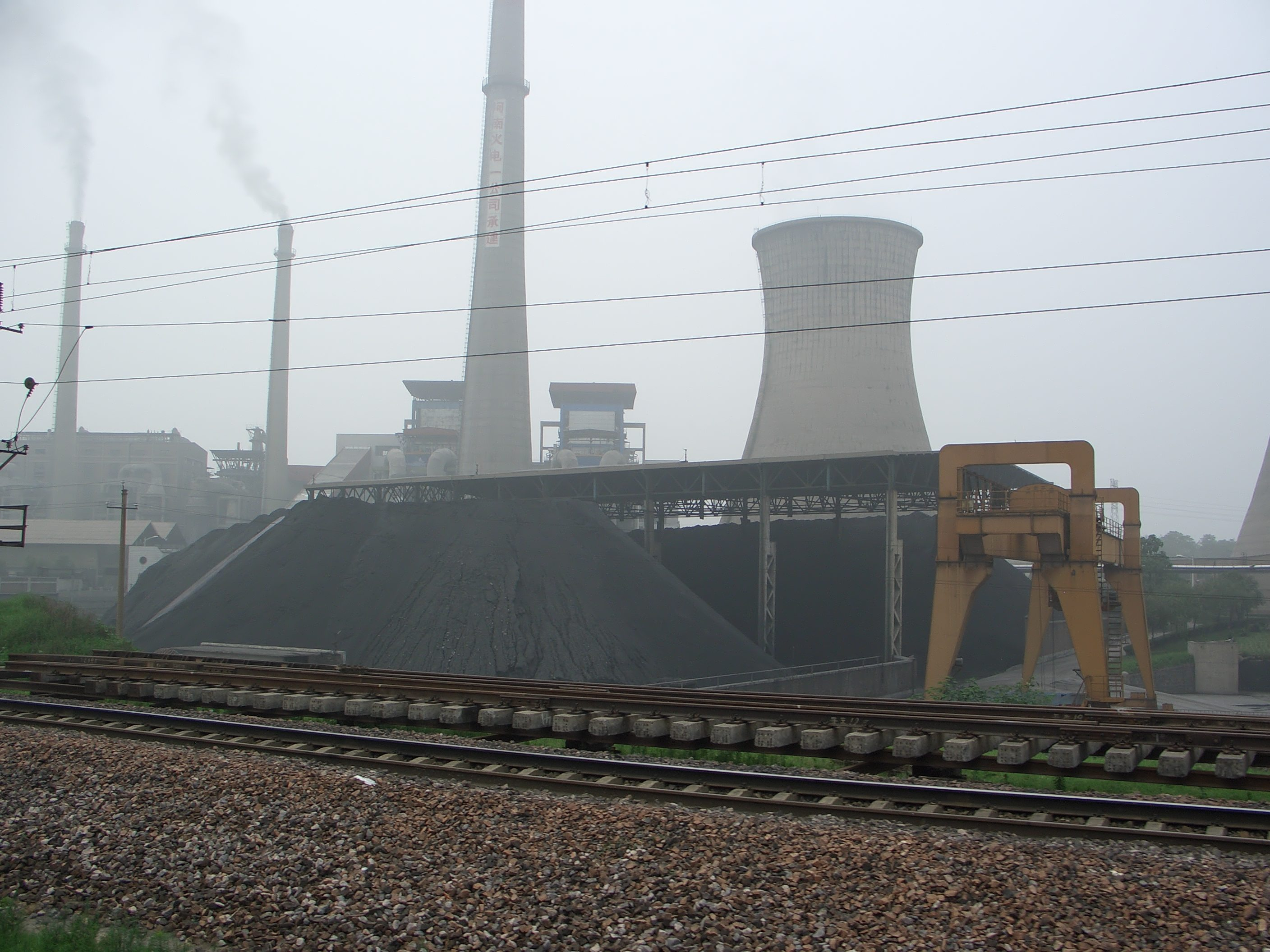
Coal-fired power plant in China

An article published in Renewable & sustainable energy reviews in 2015 pointed out that China's energy consumption and production in 2010 were greater than the early forecasts of the Ministry of Science and Technology of China. China's energy consumption has grown rapidly from 6% to 20% of the world's energy consumption in 30 years. In addition, carbon dioxide emissions have risen from 8 percent of the world's total to 24 percent in 30 years. These facts prove that the new coal chemical industry promoted by the Ministry of Science and Technology of China in 2005 has not freed China from problems such as excessive energy consumption and air pollution. The main reason for the wrong direction of the national energy development strategy is that the Ministry of Science and Technology of China incorrectly estimated the modern per capita living energy consumption. In the context of high tech development, China's per capita living energy consumption is on average 50% higher than a decade ago.

==== Future ====
It is speculated that the future energy development strategy formulated by the Ministry of Science and Technology of China will consist of three parts, namely improving energy efficiency, using more non-coal energy, and promoting national energy conservation. As for the specific energy development strategy, the Ministry of Science and Technology of China has not officially issued a statement.

== See also ==
- Hydrogen energy vision and technology roadmap
- Science and Technology Daily
