= Constituent departments of the State Council =

Structure of Chinese central government

The constituent departments of the State Council (Chinese: 国务院组成部门; pinyin: Guówùyuàn Zǔchéng Bùmén) are the principal units of State Council of the People's Republic of China. Types of departments include ministries (部; bù), commissions (委员会; wěiyuánhuì), the People's Bank of China, and the National Audit Office.

The current 14th State Council has 26 constituent departments: 21 ministries, three commissions, along with the People's Bank of China and the National Audit Office. It also has a General Office, one directly affiliated specialized institution, 14 directly affiliated institutions, one office, 7 directly affiliated public institutions, and 17 national bureaus managed by ministries and commissions of the State Council.

== Overview ==
=== Structure ===
Each department is headed by a minister, director, governor, or auditor-general, who is responsible for the work of their department. Each department head is confirmed by the National People's Congress or its Standing Committee on the recommendation of the premier, and ceremonially appointed by the president afterwards. According to the Organic Law of the State Council, the head presides over the executive meetings of the department, and "signs important requests for instructions and reports to be submitted to the State Council as well as the orders and directives to be issued". Each department additionally has two to four deputy heads (vice ministers, deputy directors, deputy governors and deputy auditors-general), assisting the department head. They are appointed or removed by the State Council.

Generally, the authority of government departments is defined by regulations and rules rather than law.

== Current departments ==
The 14th State Council has 26 constituent departments.

Constituent Departments of the 14th State Council (March 2023 – March 2028)
#	Logo	Name of department	Year established	Incumbent chief	Party	Reports to
1		Ministry of Foreign Affairs 外交部	1949 (CPG); 1954 (PRC)	Wang Yi 王毅; Minister of Foreign Affairs	CCP	General Secretary Xi Jinping ∟ Director of the Office of the Central Foreign Affairs Commission Wang Yi (himself)
2		Ministry of National Defense 国防部	1954	Dong Jun 董军; Minister of National Defense	CCP	General Secretary Xi Jinping (Chairman of the Central Military Commission)
3		National Development and Reform Commission 国家发展和改革委员会	2003	Zheng Shanjie 郑栅洁; Chairman of the National Development and Reform Commission	CCP	Vice Premier Ding Xuexiang
4		Ministry of Education 教育部	1949 (CPG); 1954 (PRC)	Huai Jinpeng 怀进鹏; Minister of Education	CCP	Vice Premier Ding Xuexiang
5		Ministry of Science and Technology 科学技术部	1998	Yin Hejun 阴和俊; Minister of Science and Technology	CCP	Vice Premier Ding Xuexiang
6		Ministry of Industry and Information Technology 工业和信息化部	2008	Li Lecheng 李乐成; Minister of Industry and Information Technology	CCP	Vice Premier Zhang Guoqing
7		National Ethnic Affairs Commission 国家民族事务委员会	1949 (CPG); 1954 (PRC)	Pan Yue 潘岳; Director of the National Ethnic Affairs Commission	CCP	Shi Taifeng (Head of the CCP Central Committee United Front Work Department)
8		Ministry of Public Security 公安部	1949 (CPG); 1954 (PRC)	Police Commissioner-General; Wang Xiaohong 王小洪 State Councillor; Minister of Public Security	CCP	Chen Wenqing (Secretary of the CCP Central Political and Legal Affairs Commission)
9		Ministry of State Security 国家安全部	1983	Chen Yixin 陈一新; Minister of State Security	CCP	Chen Wenqing (Secretary of the CCP Central Political and Legal Affairs Commission)
10		Ministry of Civil Affairs 民政部	1978	Lu Zhiyuan 陆治原; Minister of Civil Affairs	CCP	State Councillor Shen Yiqin
11		Ministry of Justice 司法部	1949 (CPG); 1954 (PRC); 1979 (re-established)	He Rong 贺荣; Minister of Justice	CCP	Chen Wenqing (Secretary of the CCP Central Political and Legal Affairs Commission)
12		Ministry of Finance 财政部	1949 (CPG); 1954 (PRC)	Lan Fo'an 蓝佛安; Minister of Finance	CCP	Vice Premier Ding Xuexiang
13		Ministry of Human Resources and Social Security 人力资源和社会保障部	2008	Wang Xiaoping 王晓萍; Ministry of Human Resources and Social Security	CCP	State Councillor Shen Yiqin
14		Ministry of Natural Resources 自然资源部	2018	Guan Zhi'ou 关志鸥; Minister of Natural Resources	CCP	Vice Premier Ding Xuexiang
15		Ministry of Ecology and Environment 生态环境部	2018	Huang Runqiu 黄润秋; Minister of Ecology and Environment	JS	Vice Premier Ding Xuexiang
16		Ministry of Housing and Urban–Rural Development 住房和城乡建设部	2008	Ni Hong 倪虹; Minister of Housing and Urban–Rural Development	CCP	Vice Premier He Lifeng
17		Ministry of Transport 交通运输部	2008	Liu Wei 刘伟; Minister of Transport	CCP	Vice Premier He Lifeng
18		Ministry of Water Resources 水利部	1949 (CPG); 1954 (PRC)	Li Guoying 李国英; Minister of Water Resources	CCP	Vice Premier Liu Guozhong
19		Ministry of Agriculture and Rural Affairs 农业农村部	2018	Han Jun 韩俊; Minister of Agriculture and Rural Affairs	CCP	Vice Premier Liu Guozhong
20		Ministry of Commerce 商务部	2003	Wang Wentao 王文涛; Minister of Commerce	CCP	Vice Premier He Lifeng
21		Ministry of Culture and Tourism 文化和旅游部	2018	Sun Yeli 孙业礼; Minister of Culture and Tourism	CCP	Li Shulei (Head of the CCP Central Committee Publicity Department)
22		National Health Commission 国家卫生健康委员会	2018	Lei Haichao 雷海潮; Head of the National Health Commission	CCP	Vice Premier Liu Guozhong
23		Ministry of Veterans Affairs 退役军人事务部	2018	Pei Jinjia 裴金佳; Minister of Veterans Affairs	CCP	State Councillor Shen Yiqin
24		Ministry of Emergency Management 应急管理部	2018	Zhang Chengzhong 张成中; Minister of Emergency Management	CCP	Vice Premier Zhang Guoqing
25		People's Bank of China 中国人民银行	1948	Pan Gongsheng 潘功胜; Governor of the People's Bank of China	CCP	Vice Premier He Lifeng (Director of the Central Financial and Economic Affairs Commission Office)
26		National Audit Office 审计署	1983	Hou Kai 侯凯; Auditor-General of the National Audit Office	CCP	Premier Li Qiang ∟ Vice Premier Ding Xuexiang

The Ministry of Education retains the external nameplate of the National Language Working Committee. The Ministry of Industry and Information Technology retains the external nameplates of China National Space Administration and of China Atomic Energy Authority. The Ministry of Human Resources and Social Security is supplemented with the nameplate of the State Administration of Foreign Experts Affairs. The Ministry of Natural Resources retains the external nameplate of the State Oceanic Administration. The Ministry of Ecology and Environment retains the external nameplate of the National Nuclear Safety Administration. The Ministry of Agriculture and Rural Affairs is supplemented with the nameplate of the National Rural Revitalization Administration.

== Former departments ==
=== Ministries ===
Name of Ministry	Year Established	Year Dissolved	Successor(s)
Ministry of Agriculture 农业部	1949 (of CPG); 1954 (of PRC)	2018	Ministry of Agriculture and Rural Affairs
Ministry of Culture 文化部	1975 (re-established)	2018	Ministry of Culture and Tourism
Ministry of Culture 文化部	1949 (of CPG); 1954 (of PRC)	1970	Culture Group of the State Council
Ministry of Supervision 监察部	1987 (re-established)	2018	National Supervisory Commission
Ministry of Supervision 监察部	1954 (of PRC)	1959	Central Commission for Discipline Inspection
Ministry of Land and Resources 国土资源部	1998	2018	Ministry of Natural Resources
Ministry of Environmental Protection 环境保护部	2008	2018	Ministry of Ecology and Environment
Ministry of Railways 铁道部	1975 (re-established)	2013	Ministry of Transport ∟ National Railway Administration China Railway Corporation
Ministry of Railways 铁道部	1949 (of CPG); 1954 (of PRC)	1975	Ministry of Transport
Ministry of Health 卫生部	1949 (of CPG); 1954 (of PRC)	2013	National Health and Family Planning Commission
Ministry of Information Industry 信息产业部	1998	2008	Ministry of Industry and Information Technology
Ministry of Labour and Social Security (China) 劳动和社会保障部	1998	2008	Ministry of Human Resources and Social Security
Ministry of Personnel 人事部	1988	2008	Ministry of Human Resources and Social Security
Ministry of Foreign Economic Relations and Trade (MOFERT) 对外经济贸易部 ↓ (renamed 1993) Ministry of Foreign Trade and Economic Co-operation (MOFTEC) 对外贸易经济合作部	1982	2003	Ministry of Commerce
Ministry of Domestic Trade 国内贸易部	1993	1998	State Bureau of Domestic Trade
Ministry of the Electronics Industry (China) 电子工业部	1993	1998	Ministry of Information Industry
Ministry of the Electronics Industry (China) 电子工业部	1982	1988	Ministry of Machine-Building and Electronics Industry
Ministry of Electric Industry 电力工业部	1993 (3rd est.)	1998	State Economic and Trade Commission
Ministry of Electric Industry 电力工业部	1979 (2nd est.)	1982	Ministry of Water Resources and Electric Power
Ministry of Electric Industry 电力工业部	1955 (1st est.)	1958	Ministry of Water Resources and Electric Power
Ministry of Coal Industry 煤炭工业部	1993	1998	State Bureau of Coal Industry
Ministry of Metallurgical Industry (MMI) 冶金工业部	1956	1998	State Bureau of Metallurgical Industry
Ministry of Chemical Industry 化学工业部	1978	1998	State Bureau of Petroleum and Chemical Industry
Ministry of Chemical Industry 化学工业部	1956	1970	Ministry of Fuel and Chemical Industry
Ministry of Posts and Telecommunications 邮电部	1973	1998	Ministry of Information Industry State Post Bureau
Ministry of Posts and Telecommunications 邮电部	1949 (of CPG); 1954 (of PRC)	1970	Ministry of Transport
Ministry of Labour 劳动部	1988	1998	Ministry of Labour and Social Security
Ministry of Labour 劳动部	1949 (of CPG); 1954 (of PRC)	1970	State Planning Commission
Ministry of Radio and Television 广播电视部 ↓ (renamed 1986) Ministry of Radio, Film and Television 广播电影电视部	1982	1998	State Administration of Radio, Film and Television (SARFT)
Ministry of Geology 地质部 ↓ (renamed 1982) Ministry of Geology and Mineral Resources 地质矿产部	1979	1998	Ministry of Land and Resources
Ministry of Geology 地质部 ↓ (renamed 1982) Ministry of Geology and Mineral Resources 地质矿产部	1949 (of CPG); 1954 (of PRC)	1970	State Planning Commission
Ministry of Forestry 林业部	1979	1998	State Forestry Administration
Ministry of Machine-Building Industry 机械工业部	1993	1998	State Bureau of Machine-Building Industry
Ministry of Machine-Building Industry 机械工业部	1982	1986	State Machine-Building Industry Commission
Ministry of Machine-Building and Electronics Industry 机械电子工业部	1988	1993	Ministry of Machine-Building Industry Ministry of Electronics Industry
Ministry of Aerospace Industry 航空航天工业部	1988	1993	China National Space Administration China Aerospace Science and Technology Corporation
Ministry of Energy 能源部	1988	1993	Ministry of Electric Industry Ministry of Coal Industry
Ministry of Petroleum Industry 石油工业部	1978	1988	Ministry of Energy
Ministry of Petroleum Industry 石油工业部	1955	1970	Ministry of Fuel and Chemical Industry
Ministry of Water Resources and Electric Power 水利电力部	1982	1988	Ministry of Water Resources Ministry of Electric Industry
Ministry of Water Resources and Electric Power 水利电力部	1958	1979	Ministry of Water Resources Ministry of Electric Industry
Ministry of Labour and Personnel 劳动人事部	1982	1988	Ministry of Labour Ministry of Personnel
7th Ministry of Machine Building 第七机械工业部 ↓ (renamed 1982) Ministry of Space Industry 航天工业部	1965	1988	Ministry of Aerospace Industry
3rd Ministry of Machine Building 第三机械工业部 ↓ (renamed 1982) Ministry of Aviation Industry 航空工业部	1963	1988	Ministry of Aerospace Industry
3rd Ministry of Machine Building 第三机械工业部 ↓ (renamed 1958) 2nd Ministry of Machine Building 第二机械工业部 ↓ (renamed 1982) Ministry of Nuclear Industry 核工业部	1955	1988	China National Nuclear Corporation
5th Ministry of Machine Building 第五机械工业部 ↓ (renamed 1982) Ministry of Ordnance Industry 兵器工业部	1963	1986	State Machine-Building Industry Commission
Ministry of Agricultural Machinery 农业机械部	1979	1982	Ministry of Machine-Building Industry
1st Ministry of Machine Building 第一机械工业部	1952 (of CPG); 1954 (of PRC)	1982	Ministry of Machine-Building Industry
Ministry of Foreign Economic Liaison 对外经济联络部	1970	1982	Ministry of Foreign Economic Relations and Trade
Ministry of Foreign Trade 对外贸易部	1952 (of CPG); 1954 (of PRC)	1982	Ministry of Foreign Economic Relations and Trade
4th Ministry of Machine Building (electronics industry) 第四机械工业部	1963	1982	Ministry of Electronics Industry
6th Ministry of Machine Building (shipbuilding) 第六机械工业部	1963	1982	China State Shipbuilding Corporation
8th Ministry of Machine Building (tactical missiles) 第八机械工业部	1979	1981	7th Ministry of Machine Building (space industry)
Ministry of Agricultural Machinery 农业机械部 ↓ (renamed 1965) 8th Ministry of Machine Building 第八机械工业部	1959	1970	1st Ministry of Machine Building
Ministry of Internal Affairs 内务部	1949 (of CPG); 1954 (of PRC)	1969	Ministry of Finance Ministry of Public Security
3rd Ministry of Machine Building (defense industry) 第三机械工业部	1960	1963	3rd Ministry of Machine Building (aviation industry) 4th Ministry of Machine Building (electronics industry) 5th Ministry of Machine Building (ordnance industry) 6th Ministry of Machine Building (shipbuilding industry)
2nd Ministry of Machine Building 第二机械工业部	1952 (of CPG); 1954 (of PRC)	1958	1st Ministry of Machine Building
Ministry of Fuel Industry 燃料工业部	1949 (of CPG); 1954 (of PRC)	1955	Ministry of Coal Industry Ministry of Petroleum Industry Ministry of Electric Industry

=== Commissions ===
Name of Commission	Year Established	Year Dissolved	Successor(s)
National Health and Family Planning Commission 国家卫生和计划生育委员会	2013	2018	National Health Commission
National Family Planning Commission 国家计划生育委员会 ↓ (renamed 2003) National Population and Family Planning Commission 国家人口和计划生育委员会	1981	2013	National Health and Family Planning Commission
Commission for Science, Technology and Industry for National Defense (COSTIND) 国防科学技术工业委员会	1982	2008	Ministry of Industry and Information Technology ∟ State Administration for Science, Technology and Industry for National Defence
State Economic and Trade Commission (SETC) 国家经济贸易委员会	1998	2003	National Development and Reform Commission State-owned Assets Supervision and Administration Commission of the State Council Ministry of Commerce
State Planning Commission 国家计划委员会 ↓ (renamed 1998) State Development Planning Commission 国家发展计划委员会	1952 (of CPG) 1954 (of PRC)	2003	National Development and Reform Commission
State Economic Commission 国家经济委员会	1993	1998	State Economic and Trade Commission
State Economic Commission 国家经济委员会	1978	1988	State Planning Commission
State Economic Commission 国家经济委员会	1956	1970	State Planning Commission
State Commission for Economic Restructuring 国家经济体制改革委员会	1982	1998	In 1998, this commission became a high-level think-tank of the State Council with the Premier serving as the director and relevant ministers as members; it was abolished in 2003.
State Physical Culture and Sports Commission 国家体育运动委员会	1972	1998	State General Administration of Sports
State Physical Culture and Sports Commission 国家体育运动委员会	1952 (of CPG) 1954 (of PRC)	1970	People's Liberation Army General Staff Department
State Machine-Building Industry Commission 国家机械工业委员会	1986	1988	Ministry of Machine-Building and Electronics Industry
Import and Export Regulation Commission of the People's Republic of China 中华人民共和国进出口管理委员会; Foreign Investment Regulation Commission of the People's Republic of China 中华人民共和国外国投资管理委员会 (one institution with two names)	1979	1982	Ministry of Foreign Economic Relations and Trade

== General Office ==
- General Office of the State Council: It is an administrative agency of the State Council which assists the leaders with the day to day administrative operations of the Chinese government.

== Directly affiliated specialized institution ==
According to the "Notice of the State Council on Institutional Establishment" issued by the State Council, there is one directly affiliated specialized institution (国务院直属特设机构).

- State-owned Assets Supervision and Administration Commission of the State Council

== Directly affiliated institutions ==
According to the "Notice of the State Council on Institutional Establishment" issued by the State Council, there are 14 directly affiliated institutions (国务院直属机构). The agencies are sorted in accordance with the official documents of the State Council.

- General Administration of Customs
- State Administration for Market Regulation
- China Securities Regulatory Commission
- General Administration of Sport of China
- National Bureau of Statistics
- China International Development Cooperation Agency
- Counsellors' Office of the State Council
- State Taxation Administration
- National Administration of Financial Regulation
- National Radio and Television Administration
- National Public Complaints and Proposals Administration
- China National Intellectual Property Administration
- National Healthcare Security Administration
- National Government Offices Administration

The State Administration for Market Regulation retains the external nameplate of the State Anti-Monopoly Bureau, the National Certification and Accreditation Administration, and the National Standardization Administration. The National Press and Publication Administration (National Copyright Administration) is an external nameplate of the Central Propaganda Department of the Chinese Communist Party. The State Administration for Religious Affairs is an external nameplate of the United Front Work Department of the Central Committee of the Chinese Communist Party.

== Office ==
According to the "Notice of the State Council on Institutional Establishment" issued by the State Council, there is one Office (国务院办事机构): the State Council Research Office (国务院研究室).

The Overseas Chinese Affairs Office of the State Council is an external nameplate of the United Front Work Department. The Hong Kong and Macao Affairs Office of the State Council is the nameplate of the Hong Kong and Macau Work Office. The Taiwan Affairs Office of the State Council and the Taiwan Affairs Office of the Central Committee of the CCP, the Cyberspace Administration of China and the Central Cyberspace Affairs Commission are both one institution with two names, and are directly under the Central Committee of the CCP. The State Council Information Office is an external nameplate of the CCP Central Propaganda Department.

== Directly affiliated public institutions ==
The State Council has seven directly affiliated public institutions (国务院直属事业单位):

- Xinhua News Agency
- Chinese Academy of Social Sciences
- State Council Development Research Center
- China Meteorological Administration
- Chinese Academy of Sciences
- Chinese Academy of Engineering
- China Central Radio and Television

The National School of Administration and the Central Party School are directly under the CCP Central Committee.

== National bureaus ==
The ministries and commissions of the State Council manage 17 national bureaus:

- National Food and Strategic Reserves Administration (managed by the National Development and Reform Commission)
- National Data Administration (managed by the National Development and Reform Commission)
- State Tobacco Monopoly Administration (managed by the Ministry of Industry and Information Technology)
- National Forestry and Grassland Administration (managed by the Ministry of Natural Resources)
- Civil Aviation Administration of China (managed by the Ministry of Transport)
- National Cultural Heritage Administration (managed by the Ministry of Culture and Tourism)
- National Administration of Disease Control and Prevention (managed by the National Health Commission)
- National Fire and Rescue Administration (managed by the Ministry of Emergency Management)
- National Medical Products Administration (managed by the State Administration for Market Regulation)
- National Energy Administration (managed by the National Development and Reform Commission)
- State Administration of Science, Technology and Industry for National Defense (managed by the Ministry of Industry and Information Technology)
- National Immigration Administration (managed by the Ministry of Public Security)
- National Railway Administration (managed by the Ministry of Transport)
- State Post Bureau (managed by the Ministry of Transport)
- National Administration of Traditional Chinese Medicine (managed by the National Health Commission)
- National Mine Safety Administration (managed by the Ministry of Emergency Management)
- State Administration of Foreign Exchange (managed by the People's Bank of China)

== See also ==
- One institution with two names
