= Ministry of Agriculture (China) =

Former agriculture ministry of China

Ministry of Agriculture of the People's Republic of China
- 中华人民共和国农业部; Zhōnghuá Rénmín Gònghéguó Nóngyèbù
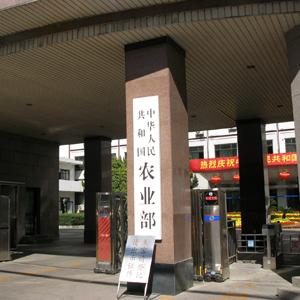
- Headquarters of the Ministry of Agriculture

Agency overview
- Formed: 29 September 1954
- Dissolved: 19 March 2018
- Superseding agency: Ministry of Agriculture and Rural Affairs
- Type: Constituent department of the State Council (ministerial-level)
- Jurisdiction: China
- Headquarters: Beijing
- Agency executive: Minister of Agriculture
- Parent agency: State Council
- Website: http://www.moa.gov.cn

The Ministry of Agriculture (MOA) was a cabinet-level executive department of the State Council which was responsible for agriculture in China.

Areas of the ministry's responsibility included agriculture and environmental issues relating to agriculture, fishery, consumer affairs, animal husbandry, horticulture, animal welfare, foodstuffs, hunting and game management as well as higher education and research in the field of agricultural sciences. The ministry was headquartered in Beijing.

The ministry was abolished in 2018, with its responsibilities being assumed by the newly created Ministry of Agriculture and Rural Affairs on March 19, 2018.

== History ==
In 2007, the MOA issued a regulation on the protection of agricultural geographical indication products. These are defined as including plants, animals, and microorganisms.

In 2015, the MOA issued the Strategic Plan for Agricultural Going Out, providing state subsidies to enterprises that invested in various overseas locations.

In 2015, the MOA announced a zero-growth plan by 2020 for the use of chemical fertilizers.

In 2016, MOA and Alibaba Group signed an agreement to promote rural e-commerce development.

Its responsibilities were assumed by the Ministry of Agriculture and Rural Affairs on March 19, 2018 as part of the deepening the reform of the Party and state institutions.

== List of Agriculture Ministers ==
No.	Name	Took office	Left office
1	Li Shucheng	October 1949	September 1954
2	Liao Luyan (廖鲁言)	September 1954	1966
post abolished
—	acting Jiang Yizhen (江一真)		
3	Sha Feng (沙风)	June 1970	January 1978
4	Yang Ligong (杨立功)	January 1978	February 1979
5	Huo Shilian (霍士廉)	February 1979	March 1981
6	Lin Hujia (林乎加)	March 1981	June 1983
7	He Kang (何康)	June 1983	June 1990
8	Liu Zhongyi (刘中一)	June 1990	March 1992
9	Liu Jiang (刘江)	March 1992	March 1998
10	Chen Yaobang (陈耀邦)	March 1998	August 2001
11	Du Qinglin	August 2001	December 2006
12	Sun Zhengcai	December 2006	November 2009
13	Han Changfu	December 2009	March 2018

== See also ==
- China Association of Agricultural Science Societies
