= HN-5 =

Portable air-defense system

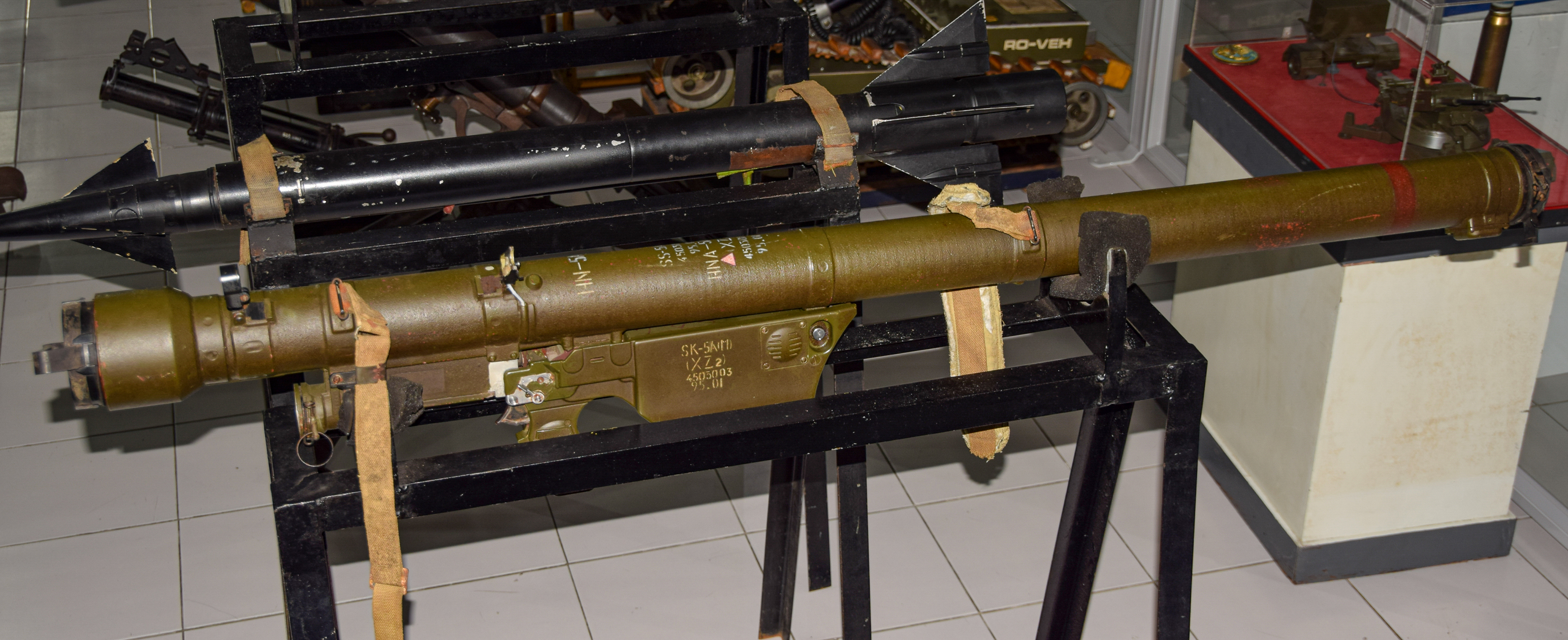
- HN-5A(M) of Thailand
- Type: MANPADS
- Place of origin: China

Service history
- In service: HN-5: 1983–present (reserve only); HN-5A: 1984–present (reserve only)
- Used by: See Operators

Production history
- Manufacturer: HN-5: Liaoning Defense Industry Office; HN-5A: Shanghai Academy of Spaceflight Technology (SAST)
- Produced: 1973–present

Specifications
- Mass: HN-5A: 10.2 kg (22 lb)
- Length: HN-5A: 1.46 m (4.8 ft)
- Diameter: 72 mm (2.8 in)
- Detonation mechanism: Impact
- Engine: Rocket motor
- Propellant: Solid fuel
- Operational range: HN-5A: 0.8–4.4 km (0.50–2.73 mi)
- Flight altitude: HN-5A: 50–2,500 m (160–8,200 ft)
- Maximum speed: 500 m/s (Mach 1.5)
- Guidance system: Infrared homing (IR)
- Launch platform: MANPADS & surface

The HN-5 (Chinese: 红缨-5; pinyin: Hóng Yīng-Wǔ; lit. 'Red Tassel-5'; NATO reporting name: CH-SA-3) is a family of first generation Chinese man-portable air-defense systems (MANPAD) based on Soviet technology. The HN abbreviation is used to avoid confusion with the HY (Hai Ying, or Sea Eagle) series anti-ship missiles of the Silkworm missile family. The HN-5 series was developed into HN-6 and QW-1 missiles.

== Development ==
The HN-5 is a reverse-engineered version of the Soviet Strela 2 (SA-7). The reverse-engineering and subsequent development took place between 1973 and 1982. The HN-5 was certified in 1983. The HN-5 was exported to Pakistan as Anza-1 and Afghanistan during the Soviet–Afghan War. The HN-5 was co-developed by the Liaoning Defense Industry Office, Third Ministry of Machine Building (aka Aviation Industry Corporation of China; AVIC), Fifth Ministry of Machine Building (aka Norinco), Seventh Ministry of Machine Building (aka China Aerospace Science and Technology Corporation; CASC and China Aerospace Science and Industry Corporation; CASIC) under designers Zhu Yuchi (Chinese: 朱玉池) and Xiao Lin (Chinese: 肖林).

The HN-5A (Chinese: 红缨-5甲; pinyin: Hóng Yīng-Wǔ jiǎ) was neither an improved variant nor a modification of the HN-5, but a parallel development began a few years later under the Shanghai Municipality Second Bureau of Electromechanical Industry, later known as the Shanghai Academy of Spaceflight Technology (SAST). The lead designers were Fan Conghui (Chinese: 范崇惠) and Ye Xiaoqing (Chinese: 叶尧卿). The HN-5A was tested between 1979 and 1981, with certification in 1984. Compared to the HN-5, the HN-5A has a larger warhead, a higher flight velocity, a longer range, a thermal filter, and a thermoelectric cooler with increased seeker sensitivity. The HN-5A largely correlates to Strela 2M.

Later, CASIC developed the second-generation MANPADS based on the HN-5, called QW-1. SAST also developed the next iteration of the HN-5 missile in parallel, called HN-6 (FN-6), which is a third-generation MANPADS.

== Variants ==
HN-5
The HN-5 is developed by Liaoning Defense Industry Office, Third Ministry of Machine Building (aka Aviation Industry Corporation of China; AVIC), Fifth Ministry of Machine Building (aka Norinco), Seventh Ministry of Machine Building (aka China Aerospace Science and Technology Corporation; CASC and China Aerospace Science and Industry Corporation; CASIC).

HN-5A
The HN-5A features a performance largely correlates to Strela 2M. A parallel development by the Shanghai Academy of Spaceflight Technology (SAST).

HN-5B
Developed from HN-5A with technology based on the Soviet 9K34 Strela-3. Although the missile had entered service with the Chinese army in the mid-1980s, it was not until 1990 that it was first publicly revealed in China. According to many domestic Chinese media sources and some sources outside China, Chinese obtained the Soviet samples via Zaire from UNITA captured 9K34 Strela-3 from Angola governmental forces, the exact the same way China obtained the 9K310 Igla-1 a short time later. The missile entered service with the Pakistani army in January 1990.

HN-5C
Vehicle-mounted version of HN-5 missiles. It can mount all missiles in the HN-5 series. It first entered production in 1986, but was not revealed to the public in China until the early 1990s. A total of eight missiles are configured into two groups of four missiles mounted on a 4x4 vehicle with an electro-optical fire control system.

HQ-5C
HQ stands for Hongqi, the Chinese designation for their surface-to-air missiles. The missile was specifically developed in the 1980s for export. The missile is modified to be compatible with Western standards.

=== Foreign derivatives ===
Pakistan has produced the HN-5 missile as the Anza Mk I, based on tech from the HN-5B. North Korea also produced HN-5 locally.

== Operators ==
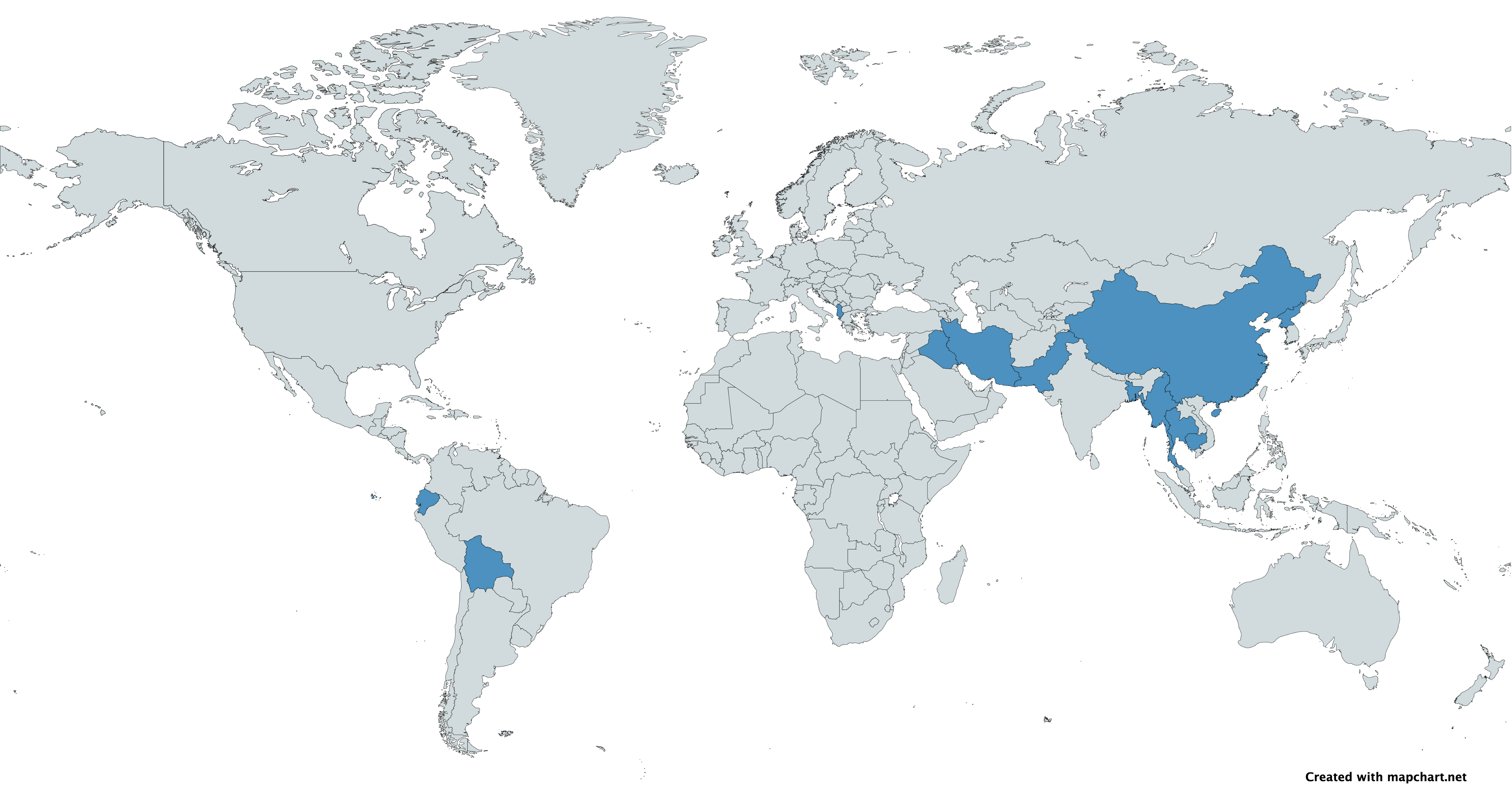
Map with HN-5 users in blue

- Albania: 100 acquired in 1978.
- Bangladesh: 50 HN-5As acquired in 1991–1992, 21 HN-5JA1 acquired in 2001.
- Bolivia: 30 HN-5As acquired in 1994.
- Cambodia: 1,000 acquired in 1992.
- China
- Ecuador: 72 HN-5As acquired in 1995.
- Iran: 500 acquired from 1986 to 1988.
- Iraq
- Myanmar: 200 HN-5As acquired in 1992.
- North Korea: 600 acquired unknown number from 1983 to 1994.
- Pakistan: 100 acquired by 1987. An additional 1,000 were produced as Anza Mk-I from 1989 to 1998.
- Thailand: 1,150 acquired from 1987 to 1988.

=== Non-state actors ===
- Afghan Mujahideen
- United Wa State Army

== Specifications ==
HN-5 series missile specifications
	HN-5	HN-5A
Introduction	1983	1984
Missile length	1.423 m (4.67 ft)	1.463 m (4.80 ft)
System length	1.508 m (4.95 ft)	
Missile weight	9.8 kg (22 lb)	10.2 kg (22 lb)
System weight	15 kg (33 lb)	16.5 kg (36 lb)
Missile diameter	72 mm (2.8 in)	72 mm (2.8 in)
Warhead		1.17 kg (2.6 lb)
Warhead filling		0.5 kg (1.1 lb)
Fuze		Impact
Flight speed		500 m/s (Mach 1.5)
Range	0.5–4.2 km (0.31–2.61 mi)	0.8–4.4 km (0.50–2.73 mi)
Altitude	50–2,300 m (160–7,550 ft)	50–2,500 m (160–8,200 ft)

== See also ==
- 9K32 Strela-2
- 9K34 Strela-3
- Anza-1
- FIM-43 Redeye
