= Zhang Ting (politician) =

Minister of the Electronics Industry of China

Zhang Ting (Chinese: 张挺; 11 September 1922 – 15 November 2018) was a Chinese Communist revolutionary and politician. He joined the Eighth Route Army and the Chinese Communist Party during the Second Sino-Japanese War, and served as China's Minister of the Electronics Industry from 1982 to 1983.

== Wartime career ==
Zhang was born 11 September 1922 into an affluent farmer and merchant family in Xin County (now Xinfu District), Shanxi, China. When the Second Sino-Japanese War broke out in 1937, Zhang, then a student at Xin County Middle School, quit school and went to the Communist headquarters in Yan'an. He enlisted in the Eighth Route Army in October 1937 and joined the Chinese Communist Party in November 1938. He fought in many battles defending the Shaan-Gan-Ning and Yimeng Mountains (Shandong) communist bases against Japanese attacks. In September 1943, he was tasked with manufacturing weapons including grenades and land mines in the Shandong Military District, which was surrounded by Japanese-occupied territory.

After the surrender of Japan in 1945, Zhang was sent to Northeast China, which had been under the occupation of the Japanese puppet-state Manchukuo. He was appointed head of the Xinkailing Arsenal in Liaodong Province in March 1946 and head of Liaodong Military District No. 1 Arsenal in January 1947. He was tasked with developing new types of ammunition to supply the People's Liberation Army in the Chinese Civil War. He was severely wounded during a weapons testing and became permanently handicapped.

== People's Republic of China ==
After the founding of the People's Republic of China in 1949, Zhang continued to work in the weapons industry in Northeast China, serving as head of the 41st Factory of the Northeast Military Region and helped supply the Chinese People's Volunteer Army in the Korean War. He later served as head of the 524th Factory of the Second Ministry of Machine Building and in the municipal government of Jilin City.

From February 1960, he served as a deputy bureau director in the First Ministry of Machine Building and the Third Ministry of Machine Building. In February 1963, he was appointed Director of Planning in the Fourth Ministry of Machine Building, which oversaw China's electronics industry.

After the Cultural Revolution, Zhang was promoted to Vice Minister of the Fourth Ministry of Machine Building in October 1977. In April 1982, he was appointed the first Minister of the Electronics Industry. He was replaced by Jiang Zemin in June 1983, after which he served as an advisor to the ministry. Starting in March 1988, Zhang served for ten years as a member of the Standing Committee of the 7th and the 8th National People's Congress, he was also a member of the National People's Congress Foreign Affairs Committee.

== Death ==
Zhang retired in May 2004. He died on 15 November 2018 in Beijing, aged 96. Chinese Communist Party general secretary Xi Jinping, Premier Li Keqiang, and former general secretaries Jiang Zemin and Hu Jintao all attended his funeral on 23 November. He was buried at the Babaoshan Revolutionary Cemetery.
