= 1993 National Games of China =

Multi-sport event in Beijing, China

7th National Games of the People's Republic of China
- Host city: Beijing and Qinhuangdao
- Athletes: 7481
- Events: 43
- Opening: 4 September
- Closing: 15 September
- Opened by: Jiang Zemin (CCP General Secretary & President)
- Torch lighter: Deng Yaping, Yang Wenyi
- Main venue: Workers' Stadium

Mingming (明明), a rooster, the mascot of the Games

The 7th National Games of the People's Republic of China were held from September 4 to September 15, 1993, in Beijing. Qi Yunhui started the Games to be held every four years, one year after the Summer Olympic Games. For the opening ceremony, China's major state leaders, including CCP General Secretary Jiang Zemin, Premier Li Peng, and Vice Premier Zhu Rongji, were present. The main venues were located in Beijing, Sichuan and Qinhuangdao City. The Games played a significant role in Beijing's bid for the 2000 Olympic Games, as they were used to test if Beijing was capable of hosting large international meetings.

== Emblem ==
The emblem is a burning torch, accompanied by the Roman numeral VII (seven), shaped into a runway by two opposite "7" symbols, representing the number of sessions.

== List of Heads of Delegations ==
- Beijing: He Luli
- Tianjin: Qian ao
- Hebei: Wangyou Hui
- Shanxi: U Tha only
- Mongolia: Zhao Zhihong
- Liaoning: Chang Yung-ming
- Jilin: Zhangyue Qi
- Heilongjiang: ZhouTieNong
- Shanghai: Gong Xueping
- Jiangsu: Zhang Huaixi
- Zhejiang: Xu pure
- Anhui: Du Yijin
- Fujian: Wang Liangpu
- Jiangxi: Mao Huang Heng
- Shandong: Aiying
- Henan : Zhang Shiying
- Hubei: Hannan Peng
- Hunan: Pan Guiyu
- Guangdong: Li Lanfang
- Guangxi: Li latent
- Hainan: Liu Ming Kai
- Sichuan: Pu Haiqing
- Guizhou: Zhang Yuqin
- Yunnan: Wangguang Xian
- Tibet: Jeep Puncog times · Gordon
- Shaanxi: Kang Shin true
- Gansu: Zhang Yue Wu
- Qinghai: Class Madain increase
- Ningxia: Liu Zhong
- Xinjiang: Wu Fu Er · Abdullah
- Garde: Chiang advanced
- Geology: Jiang Cheng Siong
- Space: Zhu Yuli, Wang Li Heng
- Chemicals: Tan Zhuzhou
- Light: - {Yu Zhen} -
- Locomotive: Lee SenMao
- Posts: Liu Pingyuan
- Forestry: Cai Yansong
- Silver Eagle: Bai Wenqing
- Petrochemical: Li Yi
- Coal: Baoming
- Oil: Admiralty super
- Automotive: Yu Zhi ring, Ding Zhihuan
- People's Liberation Army: Liu Xiaojiang

== Sports ==
There were a total of 43 sports contested across three cities.

- Aquatics
  - Diving
  - Swimming
  - Synchronised swimming
  - Water polo
- Archery
- Athletics
- Aviation model
- Badminton
- Baseball
- Basketball
- Boxing
- Cycling
- Chinese-style wrestling
- Equestrian
- Fencing
- Football
- Go (game)
- Gymnastics
  - Artistic gymnastics
  - Rhythmic gymnastics
- Handball
- Hockey
- Judo
- Kayaking
- Martial arts
- Modern pentathlon
- Navigation model
- Parachuting
- Radio direction finding
- Rowing
- Sailing
- Shooting
- Short track speed skating
- Softball
- Speed skating
- Table tennis
- Tennis
- Volleyball
- Water skiing
- Weightlifting
- Wrestling
- Windsurfing

=== Locations ===
Beijing hosted 26 events: athletics, swimming, gymnastics, artistic gymnastics, weight lifting, fencing, judo, international style wrestling, boxing, modern pentathlon, equestrianism, Chinese-style wrestling, Go, speed skating, short track skating, cycling, navigation model, radio direction finding, parachute, soccer, basketball, table tennis, tennis, handball, hockey, and women's softball.

Sichuan hosted 15 events: diving, water polo, synchronized swimming, fencing, shooting, archery, rowing, kayaking, swimming, water skiing, aviation model, volleyball, badminton, baseball, and martial arts.

Qinhuangdao City hosted two events: sailing and windsurfing.

== Records ==
There were 4 world records set at the Games. Three of them were set in athletics:

- Women's 1500 meters: Qu Yunxia ran 3:50.46.
- Women's 3000 meters: Wang Junxia ran 8:06.11.
- Women's 10000 meters: Wang Junxia ran 29:31.78.

== Medals ==
Place	Nationality	Gold	Silver	Bronze
1	Liaoning Province	44	48	44
2	Guangdong	29	28	26
3	Shanghai	26	19	16
4	Beijing	21	20	23
5	Hubei	19	12	11
6	Henan	19	8	17
7	Jiangsu Province	18	12	18
8	Sichuan Province	15	14	22
9	Hunan	14	13	13
10	People's Liberation Army	14	12	10
11	Shandong	12	15	15
12	Fujian Province	11	4	2
13	Anhui	11	3	10
14	Inner Mongolia	10	12	10
15	Shanxi	10	4	3
16	Jilin	9	8	12
17	Zhejiang	8	7	9
18	Hebei	7	15	11
19	Guangxi	6	13	7
20	Tianjin	5	15	7
21	Xinjiang	5	3	9
22	Heilongjiang	4	13	11
23	Gansu	4	7	5
24	Guizhou	3	4	1
25	Jiangxi	3	3	5
26	Yunnan	2	3	4
27	Shaanxi	1	5	5
28	Posts	1	1	4
29	Qinghai	1	1	3
30	Avant	1	1	3
31	Hainan	1	0	1
32	Tibet	0	0	1
33	Oil	0	0	1
34	Mine	0	0	1
35	Ningxia	0	0	1
