= Lu Yuanjiu =

Chinese physicist (1920–2023)

- 陆元九
- Born: 9 January 1920; Chuzhou, Anhui, China
- Died: 6 June 2023 (aged 103)
- Education: National Central University; Massachusetts Institute of Technology
- Scientific career
- Fields: Automation; gyroscope; inertial navigation system
- Workplaces: Ministry of Aerospace Industry; Ministry of Astronautics Industry

Chinese name
- Simplified Chinese: 陆元九
- Traditional Chinese: 陸元九
Transcriptions
Standard Mandarin
- Hanyu Pinyin: Lù Yuánjiǔ

Lu Yuanjiu (9 January 1920 – 6 June 2023) was a Chinese physicist. He was a member of the Chinese Academy of Sciences and Chinese Academy of Engineering.

== Biography ==
Lu was born in Chu County, Anhui, on 9 January 1920. His father was a teacher. He attended the Anhui Provincial No. 8 Middle School and Jiangsu Provincial Nanjing High School, and in November 1937 was accepted to the National Central University. That same year, the Imperial Japanese Army occupied north China and he escaped to Chongqing, where his university had relocated. In 1945, he pursued advanced studies in the United States on government scholarships. He earned his doctor's degree at Massachusetts Institute of Technology under the direction of C. S. Dreber. After graduation, he became an associate research fellow at the institute. In January 1954, he joined a scientific laboratory at Ford Motor Company as an engineer.

Lu returned to China in 1956, and that same year became vice dean of the Institute of Automation, Chinese Academy of Sciences. In 1966, Mao Zedong launched the Cultural Revolution, and during this period Lu was criticized, deprived of all his work, and forced to perform farm work at the May Seventh Cadre Schools. He moved to the 520th Research Institute of National Central University in January 1968, and was promoted to director of the 13th Research Institute in January 1978. In January 1984, he became a member of the Standing Committee of Science and Technology Committee of Ministry of Astronautics Industry.

Lu died on 6 June 2023, at the age of 103.

== Honours and awards ==
- 1980 Member of the Chinese Academy of Sciences (CAS)
- 1994 Member of the Chinese Academy of Engineering (CAE)
- 1997 Science and Technology Achievement Award of the Ho Leung Ho Lee Foundation
- 2021 July 1 Medal
