= Liang Shoupan =

Chinese aerospace engineer (1916–2009)

Liang Shoupan (Chinese: 梁守槃; 13 April 1916 – 5 September 2009) was a Chinese aerospace engineer. The chief designer of China's first generation of anti-ship missiles including the HY-1 and HY-2, he is regarded as the "father of China's cruise missile program". He also designed the C-101, C-801 and other missiles. He was an academician of the Chinese Academy of Sciences and the International Academy of Astronautics. In 2006, he was one of the five scientists who received the Highest Achievement Award of China's aerospace industry.

== Early life and education ==
Liang was born on 13 April 1916 in Fuzhou, Fujian, Republic of China. His father Liang Jingchun (梁敬錞) was an official in the Ministry of Justice of the Beiyang government and served as an advisor to the Kuomintang government in Taiwan after 1949. He spent his childhood in Beijing and attended secondary schools in Beijing, Tianjin, and Shanghai.

In June 1933, Liang entered Tsinghua University to study aeronautical engineering. As soon as he earned his bachelor's degree in June 1937, the Second Sino-Japanese War broke out. He enlisted in the Republic of China Air Force and studied at its advanced aeronautical engineering program. In August 1938, he went to the United States to study aeronautical engineering at the Massachusetts Institute of Technology. He earned his master's degree in just a year and returned to China in February 1940.

== Career ==
From February 1940 to August 1942, Liang taught aeronautical and mechanical engineering at the National Southwestern Associated University in Kunming. Starting in August 1942, he worked at Guizhou Aeronautical Engine Factory as an engineer and designer for three years. After the surrender of Japan in August 1945, he joined Zhejiang University as a professor and was appointed chair of the Aeronautical Engineering Department in June 1949.

After the establishment of the People's Republic of China, Liang became a professor at Harbin Institute of Military Technology in September 1952. In May 1956, he was transferred to the newly established Fifth Academy (for aerospace and missile research) of the Ministry of National Defense and awarded the military rank of colonel. A leading scientist in the start-up phase of the Fifth Academy, he was put in charge of rocket engine research and later comprehensive design.

After the Fifth Academy was upgraded to the Seventh Ministry of Machine Building in 1965, Liang served as head of the Third (Sub-) Academy, in charge of the development of anti-ship missiles for coastal defence. He was the chief designer of HY-1 and HY-2 (known in the West as the Silkworm) anti-ship missiles, and the C-101 supersonic missile. From the late 1970s to the early 1980s, he was the chief designer of the C-801 anti-ship missile, which was comparable to the Exocet of France. After 1982, he served as vice director of the Science and Technology Committee of the Ministry of Aerospace Industry (the former Seventh Ministry).

Liang served as a delegate to the Third, Fourth, and Fifth National People's Congresses, and was a member of the Third, Sixth, and Seventh National Chinese People's Political Consultative Conference (CPPCC).

Liang died on 5 September 2009 in Beijing, at the age of 93.

== Honours and recognition ==
Liang was elected an academician of the Chinese Academy of Sciences in 1980 and of the International Academy of Astronautics in 1985.

Liang was conferred a Special Prize of the State Science and Technology Progress Award in 1988 and the Qiu Shi Distinguished Scientist Prize in 1994. In 2006, he was one of the five scientists who received the Highest Achievement Award for the first 50 years of China's aerospace industry, together with Qian Xuesen, Ren Xinmin, Tu Shou'e, and Huang Weilu.
