= Ren Xinmin =

Chinese scientist

- 任新民
- Born: 5 December 1915; Ningguo, Anhui, China
- Died: 12 February 2017 (aged 101); Beijing, China
- Education: National Central University; Chongqing Ordnance School affiliated to Military Ministry (now Chung Cheng Institute of Technology, NDU); University of Michigan
- Known for: participant in the Two Bombs, One Satellite Project
- Scientific career
- Fields: Aeronautics
- Workplaces: University at Buffalo; Institute of Military Engineering; China Aerospace Science & Technology Corporation

Ren Xinmin (Chinese: 任新民; pinyin: Rén Xīnmín; Wade–Giles: Jen Hsin-min; 5 December 1915 – 12 February 2017) was a Chinese aerospace engineer and a specialist in astronautics and liquid rocket engine technology. He was the technical director of the Long March 1 rocket, which launched the Dong Fang Hong I, China's first satellite, and the chief designer of Chinese storable propellant rocket engine. He was also the chief designer for the Long March 3 launch vehicle, Fengyun, and SJ (Shijian) series satellites.

Together with Huang Weilu, Tu Shou'e, and Liang Shoupan, Ren was considered one of the "Four Elders of China's Aerospace", only surpassed by Qian Xuesen, the founder of China's aerospace industry. He was awarded the Two Bombs, One Satellite Merit Medal in 1999. Ren was elected a member of the Chinese Academy of Sciences in 1980.

== Early life and education ==
Ren Xinmin was born on 5 December 1915, in Ningguo, Anhui Province. When he was a middle school student, he joined the Communist Youth League. He studied chemical engineering at the National Central University in Nanjing. After the outbreak of the Second Sino-Japanese War in 1937, he took refuge in Chongqing where he studied gun design at the National Institute of Technology, Ministry of Military Administration. He worked at an armoury after graduation in 1940. Ren attended the University of Michigan in 1945, where he obtained his MS and PhD.

== Career ==
After the Second World War, Ren read a book authored by Qian that roused his interest in rocket science. When he returned to China in 1949, he arrived in Nanjing and was offered a research fellowship until 1952, when he left for Harbin. In those three years, Ren and his colleagues attempted to launch a tiny rocket, though experimentation was never completed.

Despite Ren's specialisation in mechanical engineering, he was appointed as the director of rocket teaching and research section to teach the solid-propellant rocket course at the Institute of Military Engineering.

Ren was then recruited by the Fifth Academy of the Ministry of Defence in 1956. His first task was incorporating the design and technology to replicate the R-2 rocket with the assistance of Soviet experts. Dongfeng 1, a licensed version of the R-2 with limited maximum range, was launched smoothly in 1960. Ren was appointed as the chief designer and helped develop the Dongfeng 2, a medium-range rocket, in 1961.

A colleague recalled, in a 2014 documentary, Ren leading a successful five-day march in 1967 in the cold western desert seeking a downed test rocket as one anecdote from his long career.

Ren served as Vice Minister of the Seventh Ministry of Machine Building from 1975 until 1982, when he was moved to the Ministry of Aerospace Industry. There, the 331 Project, to build and launch a communication satellite, was successfully implemented. Ren was in charge of its five sections as chief engineer and was nicknamed the "Chief Chief Engineer (总总师)".

Ren's insistence on applying LO_{X}/LH_{2} rocket engines led to the success of the Long March 3 in 1984, even though he had suffered numerous failures, and then faced the resulting backlash. He had also been a dedicated promoter of China's crewed spaceflight and space station projects since the 1980s.

== Personal life ==
Ren married Yu Shuangqin (Chinese: 虞霜琴), the daughter of a Nationalist government official, in 1944.

Ren died on 12 February 2017, in Beijing, aged 101 (102 in East Asian age reckoning). His wife and children survived him.
