= Lü Dong =

Chinese politician

- 吕东

Director of the State Economic Commission
- In office September 1984 – April 1988
- Premier: Zhao Ziyang
- Preceded by: Zhang Jingfu
- Succeeded by: Wang Zhongyu

Minister of the Third Ministry of Machine Building
- In office December 1977 – September 1981
- Premier: Hua Guofeng
- Preceded by: Li Jitai
- Succeeded by: Mo Wenxiang

Minister of Metallurgical Industry
- In office April 1964 – October 1967
- Premier: Zhou Enlai
- Preceded by: Wang Heshou
- Succeeded by: Zhu Huning

Personal details
- Born: July 1915 Haicheng County, Liaoning, China
- Died: May 8, 2002 (aged 86) Beijing, China
- Party: Chinese Communist Party
- Education: Peking University

Chinese name
- Simplified Chinese: 吕东
- Traditional Chinese: 呂東
Transcriptions
Standard Mandarin
- Hanyu Pinyin: Lǚ Dōng

Lü Dong (Chinese: 吕东; July 1915 – 8 May 2002) was a Chinese politician who served as Minister of Metallurgical Industry from 1964 to 1967, Minister of the Third Ministry of Machine Building from 1977 to 1981, and director of the State Economic Commission from 1984 to 1988. He was a representative of the 12th, 13th National Congress of the Chinese Communist Party, and 14th National Congress of the Chinese Communist Party. He was a member of the 4th National Committee of the Chinese People's Political Consultative Conference and a member of the Standing Committee of the 5th and 6th Chinese People's Political Consultative Conference. He was a member of the Central Advisory Commission.

== Biography ==
Lü was born in Haicheng County (now Haicheng), Liaoning, in July 1915. In 1935, he was accepted to the Department of History and Geography, Northeastern University, but switched to the Department of History, Peking University a year later.

Lü joined the Chinese Communist Party (CCP) in October 1937. In 1938, he established the Printing Bureau of the Finance Department of the Shanxi-Chahar-Hebei Administrative Committee, and served as its director. In 1940, he became inspector of the office of the 1st Administrative of the Shanxi-Chahar-Hebei Border Region and secretary-general of the Hebei-Chahar Border Region.

After the Second Sino-Japanese War, he successively served as party secretary of Shenyang, secretary-general of the Liaoning Provincial People's Government, deputy secretary of the Finance Committee of the Liaodong Branch, secretary-general of the Liaodong Office of the Northeast Administrative Committee, director and party secretary of the Liaodong Provincial Finance Office, and deputy secretary of the Finance Committee of the Nanman Branch. He was elevated to first deputy minister of northeast industry in November 1948.

After the founding of the Communist State, in August 1952, he was appointed as deputy minister of the heavy industry, responsible for daily work. Starting from May 1956, he successively served as executive vice minister, minister, and party branch secretary of the Ministry of Metallurgical Industry.

During the Cultural Revolution, he suffered political persecution and persecuted by Lin Biao and the Gang of Four, and was imprisoned for four years.

In 1977, he was named minister of the Third Ministry of Machine Building (later renamed as the Ministry of Aviation Industry). In 1980, he was appointed first deputy director of the Machinery Industry Commission of the State Council, responsible for daily work. In January 1982, he was chosen as executive deputy director the newly founded State Economic Commission, and two years later promoted to the director position. In April 1988, he became an advisor to the Central Financial and Economic Leadership Group and president of the China Industrial Economic Association.

Lü died on 8 May 2002 in Beijing, at the age of 86.

Government offices
Preceded by Wang Heshou	Minister of Metallurgical Industry; 1964–1967	Succeeded by Zhu Huning
Preceded by Li Jitai	Minister of the Third Ministry of Machine Building; 1977–1981	Succeeded by Mo Wenxiang
Preceded by Zhang Jingfu	Director of the State Economic Commission; 1984–1988	Succeeded by Wang Zhongyu
