= Statistics of the National Games of China =

This article involves the historical statistics of the National Games of China, starting with the first edition of the event hosted in 1959 by Beijing at Workers' Stadium.

== Host cities ==
Host cities of the National Games

== List of the National Games ==
Year	Games	Host	Teams	Athletes	OE	DE	Top placed team	Ref
1959	I	Beijing	29	10,658	36	6	People's Liberation Army	
1965	II	Beijing	29	5,922	22	1	People's Liberation Army	
1975	III	Beijing	31	12,497	28	6	Guangdong	
1979	IV	Beijing	31	15,189	34	1	People's Liberation Army	
1983	V	Shanghai	31	8,943	25	1	Guangdong	
1987	VI	Guangzhou	37	7,228	44	3	Guangdong	
1993	VII	Beijing	45	4,228	43	0	Liaoning	
1997	VIII	Shanghai	46	7,647	28	0	Shanghai	
2001	IX	Guangzhou	45	12,314	30	0	Guangdong	
2005	X	Nanjing	46	9,986	42	0	Jiangsu	
2009	XI	Jinan	41	12,000+	33	0	Shandong	
2013	XII	Shenyang	33	9,000+	31	0	Shandong	
2017	XIII	Tianjin	38	8,478	31	0	Shandong	
2021	XIV	Xi'an	39+	12,000+			Shandong	
2025	XV	Guangdong; Hong Kong; Macau	Future event					

Notes:

OE: Official events.
DE: Demonstration events.

== All-time medal table ==
=== Medal count ===
Defunct teams

Rank	Team	Gold	Silver	Bronze	Total
1	People's Liberation Army	596.5	435.5	387.5	1419.5
2	Guangdong Province	490.5	402	335.5	1228
3	Shanghai Municipality	413.5	427.5	375	1216
4	Liaoning Province	368	358.5	325.5	1052
5	Beijing Municipality	345	341.5	317.5	1004
6	Shandong Province	315	268.5	264	847.5
7	Jiangsu Province	276	249.5	285	710.5
8	Heilongjiang Province	180.5	209	179	568.5
9	Zhejiang Province	162	160.5	156	478.5
10	Jilin Province	135.5	135.5	150.5	421.5
11	Fujian Province	135	123	139	397
12	Hebei Province	133.5	141	202.5	477
13	Hubei Province	128	126.5	144	398.5
14	Hunan Province	123	116.5	117.5	357
15	Shanxi Province	122.5	89	91	302.5
16	Sichuan Province	121.5	174.5	195.5	491.5
17	Inner Mongolia Autonomous Region	107	96.5	103	306.5
18	Henan Province	102.5	94	125	321.5
19	Tianjin Municipality	98	106.5	95.5	300
20	Guangxi Zhuang Autonomous Region	96	102.5	98.5	297
21	Anhui Province	82.5	82.5	135	300
22	Jiangxi Province	64.5	55	57.5	177
23	Shaanxi Province	61	67.5	69	197.5
24	Yunnan Province	56.5	84.5	74	215
25	Xinjiang Uyghur Autonomous Region	45	59	57	161
26	Gansu Province	29.5	37.5	35.5	102.5
27	Guizhou Province	22	33	59.5	114.5
28	Qinghai Province	12.5	24	35	71.5
29	Chongqing Multicipality	9.5	11	15	35.5
30	China Qianwei Sports Association	9	14	16	39
31	China Locomotive Sports Association	9	6.5	11.5	27
32	Hong Kong Special Administrative Region	8	7	11	26
33	Harbin City	7	3	4	14
34	Tibet Autonomous Region	6	7	7	20
35	Tonghua City	5	6	1	12
36	Hainan Province	5	4.5	12	21.5
37	Songhua River Area	4	2	3	9
38	Ningxia Hui Autonomous Region	3	4	12.5	19.5
39	Qiqihar City	2	3	1	6
40	Independent Athletes	1	2	2	5
41	China Communication Sports Association	1	1	7	9
42	Heihe Area	1	0	0	1
43	China Coal Mine Sports Association	0	2	2	4
44	China Financial Sports Association	0	1	4	5
45	Xinjiang Production and Construction Corps	0	1	1.5	2.5
46	China Petroleum Sports Association	0	1	1	2
47	China Construction Sports Association	0	0	2	2
=48	China Water Conservancy Sports Association	0	0	1	1
=48	Jiamusi City	0	0	1	1
=50	China Aerospace Sports Association	0	0	0	0
=50	China Aviation Sports Association	0	0	0	0
=50	China Chemical Sports Association	0	0	0	0
=50	China Electric Power Sports Association	0	0	0	0
=50	China Forestry Sports Association	0	0	0	0
=50	China Metallurgical Sports Association	0	0	0	0
=50	Macau Special Administrative Region	0	0	0	0
=50	Taiwan Province	0	0	0	0
