= Snail Incident =

The Snail Incident (simplified Chinese: 蜗牛事件; traditional Chinese: 蝸牛事件) was a political incident in China during the Cultural Revolution. It stemmed from China's attempt to import a colour picture tube production line from the United States. In 1973, Chinese officials received a set of decorative glass snails from Corning Incorporated as a gift. In 1974, Jiang Qing, the wife of Mao Zedong, alleged that the snail was a deliberate symbol mocking China's slow pace of development, claiming it to be part of a U.S. smear campaign. Zhou Enlai intervened to rebut Jiang Qing's accusation, but the incident led to the cancellation of plans to adopt American colour television technology. Five years later, China introduced similar technology from Japan instead.

== Background ==
The Cultural Revolution, initiated by Mao Zedong in 1966, saw a significant shift in direction following the death of Mao's designated successor, Lin Biao, in September 1971. By 1970, Premier Zhou Enlai had already begun moving China away from the most extreme policies of the Cultural Revolution. This shift included a revival of foreign trade policies from the mid-1960s as part of Zhou's broader strategy for economic reconstruction. Zhou's initiatives focused on modernising China's economy by acquiring foreign technology and expertise. However, these efforts faced resistance from radical leftist leaders, who adhered to a rigid ideology of self-reliance and viewed negotiations with the United States as ideologically compromising. As a result, moderates had to frame their plans with strong ideological justifications to secure acceptance. In the early 1970s, as relations between China and the United States began to thaw, China resumed technological exchanges and imports from Western countries.

== Initial negotiations ==
In 1972, the State Council of China approved the import of a colour television production line. The implementation was entrusted to the Fourth Ministry of Machine Building, the Ministry of Foreign Trade, the Central Bureau of Broadcasting, and the National Planning Commission. The official reason for the import was stated as "to more vividly reflect the radiant image of our leaders."

At the time, China lacked the key technologies required to produce colour picture tubes, including glass shells, phosphor, shadow masks, graphite emulsion, and assembly lines. The Radio Corporation of America (RCA) was then a leading manufacturer of picture tubes with expertise in all these technologies. Consequently, China National Technical Import and Export Corporation, under the Fourth Ministry of Machine Building, sought a price quotation from RCA and invited representatives to Beijing to begin negotiations. During these talks, RCA's quoted price dropped from $130 million to $73 million.

On 23 November 1973, the Fourth Ministry sent a delegation of 12 people to the United States for an on-site inspection. After visiting RCA, the delegation toured Corning Incorporated, which specialised in glass shell manufacturing. Upon the delegation's departure, Corning presented each Chinese delegate with a small glass sculpture of a sea snail as a souvenir.

== Political interventions ==
In February 1974, during the "Criticise Lin, Criticise Confucius" campaign, a young official from the Fourth Ministry of Machine Building, Xu Wenbin, wrote to Jiang Qing, reporting that the snail souvenir given to the inspection team was an insult from the Americans. Jiang, outraged upon receiving the letter, accused the United States of mocking China with its slow pace of development and used the incident to lodge a protest with the U.S. Liaison Office in Beijing. She declared a refusal to proceed with importing the colour television production line.

Following this, the Ministry convened multiple meetings, condemning the gift as a deliberate insult to the Chinese people. They strongly demanded that ministry leaders abandon plans to import colour television tube technology from the U.S. and insisted the gifts be returned via diplomatic channels. The ministry leadership was also criticised for their "rightist tendencies." Similar denunciation meetings were held in the Ministry of Water Resources and Electric Power and the Ministry of Posts and Telecommunications, where large-character posters and public condemnation proliferated.

Under Zhou Enlai's direction, the Ministry of Foreign Affairs investigated the matter. They found that, while "moving at a snail's pace" is indeed an English expression for slowness, the snail was actually a Christmas gift manufactured by Corning Incorporated. Corning had warmly welcomed the Chinese delegation, and no evidence of disrespectful behaviour was found.

On 18 and 19 February 1974, Zhou Enlai twice instructed the Ministry of Foreign Affairs to conduct further investigation before making a final decision. Ultimately, the ministry recommended that no action be taken to return or protest the snail gift. This position was endorsed by Mao Zedong. During this period, Zhou chaired a Politburo meeting to review the incident. The meeting concluded that Jiang Qing's comments at the Fourth Ministry were incorrect. Her statements were ordered not to be distributed, and any printed copies were immediately recalled. With this resolution, the chaos finally came to an end.

== Aftermath ==
Jiang Qing attempted to use the event as a political manoeuvre to escalate tensions and tie the controversy to the "Criticise Lin, Criticise Confucius" campaign. Her goal was to gain an advantage in her political struggle against Zhou Enlai, but the effort ultimately failed. However, the plan to import the colour television production line was also shelved as a result.

In 1976, following the end of the Cultural Revolution, the Fourth Ministry of Machine Building, the Ministry of Foreign Trade and Economic Cooperation, the Central Bureau of Broadcasting, and the National Planning Commission submitted a renewed proposal to import the production line. After over a year of negotiations with Japan, a contract was finally signed in September 1979. The agreement involved adopting Hitachi's assembly line, Asahi Glass's glass shell line, Dai Nippon Ink and Chemicals’ phosphor line, and Dai Nippon Screen's shadow mask line. The four production lines cost over $160 million. The incident delayed the introduction of colour television in China by at least five years, causing an economic loss estimated at 700 million yuan.
