= Yaobang =

Yaobang (Chinese: 耀邦) is a masculine given name. Notable people with the name include:

- Chen Yaobang (born 1935), Chinese politician
- Hu Yaobang (1915–1989), Chinese politician
