= Zhang Ting =

Zhang Ting or Chang Ting may refer to:

- Zhang Ting (politician) (张挺; 1922–2018), Minister of the Electronics Industry of China
- Chang Ting (actress) (張庭; born 1970), Taiwanese actress
- Zhang Ting (athlete), Chinese Paralympic athlete
