= Chen Shaokun =

Chinese army officer and politician (1921–2020)

- 陈绍昆

3rd Minister (Head) of Metallurgical Industry
- In office February 1970 – May 1977
- Prime Minister: Zhou Enlai→Hua Guofeng
- Preceded by: Lü Dong
- Succeeded by: Tang Ke

5th Director of Political Department of Shenyang Military Region
- In office August 1969 – February 1970
- Preceded by: Li Boqiu
- Succeeded by: Zhang Wu (born 1920)

Deputy Political Commissar of Shenyang Military Region
- In office August 1969 – June 1975
- Political Commissar: Pan Fusheng→Mao Yuanxin

Personal details
- Born: April 20, 1921 Suyu District, Suqian, Jiangsu, China
- Died: October 10, 2020 (aged 99) Beijing, China
- Party: Chinese Communist Party
- Spouse: Yang Jingyuan
- Children: Chen Honghai
- Education: Counter-Japanese Military and Political University
- Occupation: Army officer, politician

Military service
- Allegiance: People's Republic of China
- Branch/service: People's Liberation Army Ground Force
- Years of service: 1939–1970
- Rank: Major General
- Battles/wars: Second Sino-Japanese War; Chinese Civil War; Korean War
- Awards: National Flag Medal (1952); Order of Freedom and Independence (2nd Class Medal) (1952); Order of Independence and Freedom (2nd Class Medal) (1955); Order of Liberation (2nd Class Medal) (1955)

Chinese name
- Traditional Chinese: 陳紹昆
- Simplified Chinese: 陈绍昆
Transcriptions
Standard Mandarin
- Hanyu Pinyin: Chén Shàokūn

Chen Shaokun (Chinese: 陈绍昆; 20 April 1921 – 10 October 2020) was a Chinese army officer and politician who served as minister of Metallurgical Industry from 1975 to 1977. Prior to that, he was director of Political Department of Shenyang Military Region between 1969 and 1970 and deputy political commissar of Shenyang Military Region between 1969 and 1975.

== Biography ==
Chen was born in Suyu District of Suqian, Jiangsu, on April 20, 1921. After graduating from Suqian High School, he was admitted to Counter-Japanese Military and Political University. He enlisted in the Eighth Route Army in 1939, and joined the Chinese Communist Party in 1940.

=== Second Sino-Japanese War ===
In 1940, he served in Sishu County (泗沭县) as party chief and deputy captain of guerrilla force. After that, he became director of Political Division of the New 1st Group Army.

=== Chinese Civil War ===
In the early period of the Chinese Civil War, he was political commissar of the 15th Regiment of the 2nd Column in the Northeast People's Liberation Army and then political commissar of the 348th Regiment of the 116th Division in the 39th Group Army. He participated in the 1948 Battle of Jinzhou attacks led by Lin Biao and Luo Ronghuan in northeast China's Liaoning province. He also participated in the Pingjin campaign, Yangtze River Crossing Campaign, and Guangdong-Guangxi campaign.

=== Korean War ===
After the outbreak of the Korean War, he was commissioned director of Political Department of the 116th Division of the 39th Group Army. His army overwhelmed the 8th Regiment of the 1st Cavalry Division of the United States Army during the Battle of Unsan. In 1952, he became deputy political commissar of the 117th Division, and in 1953 received a promotion to political commissar of 115th Division.

After returning to China, he became political commissar of 116th Division in 1954. In 1962, he was director of Political Department, deputy political commissar, and then political commissar of the 39th Group Army. He was promoted to the rank of major general (Shaojiang) in 1964. In 1969, he was transferred to Shenyang Military Region and appointed deputy political commissar and director of Political Department. In February of the following year, he was assigned to the Ministry of Metallurgical Industry, where he was promoted to its head in 1970. He retired in 1977.

=== Death ===
He died in Beijing on October 10, 2020, aged 99.

== Personal life ==
He married Yang Jingyuan (杨景援). Their son, Chen Honghai (born 1955), is also a major general (Shaojiang) in the People's Liberation Army (PLA) of China.

== Work ==
- 回顾 [Review] (in Chinese). Shenyang, Liaoning: Northeast University Press. 2006. ISBN 7811022443.

== Awards ==
- National Flag Medal (1952)
- Order of Freedom and Independence (2nd Class Medal) (1952)
- Order of Independence and Freedom (2nd Class Medal) (1955)
- Order of Liberation (2nd Class Medal) (1955)

Military offices
Preceded by Li Boqiu	5th Director of Political Department of Shenyang Military Region; 1969-1970	Succeeded by Zhang Wu (born 1920)
Government offices
Preceded by Lü Dong	3rd Minister (Head) of Metallurgical Industry; 1970-1977	Succeeded by Tang Ke
