= Huang Weilu =

Chinese aerospace and electrical engineer

Huang Weilu (Chinese: 黄纬禄; 18 December 1916 – 23 November 2011) was a Chinese aerospace and electrical engineer who was a specialist in the control systems of missiles and rockets. The chief designer of JL-1, China's first submarine-launched ballistic missile (SLBM), he was awarded the Two Bombs, One Satellite Meritorious Medal in 1999 and the Highest Achievement Award of China's aerospace industry in 2006. He was an academician of the Chinese Academy of Sciences and the International Academy of Astronautics.

== Early life and education ==
Huang was born on 18 December 1916 in Wuhu, Anhui, Republic of China. After graduating from the Department of Electrical Engineering of National Central University in 1940, he went to work in the United Kingdom in 1943. In 1945, he entered Imperial College London to study radio electronics and earned his M.S. degree two years later.

== Career ==
Huang returned to China in 1947 and worked as a research scientist in Shanghai. In 1958, he joined the Fifth Academy (aerospace research) of the Ministry of National Defense with the military rank of colonel. He focused on solving technical issues of control systems for liquid-fuelled intercontinental ballistic missiles (ICBM), then being developed in China with the assistance of the Soviet Union.

In 1965, the Fifth Academy was reorganized into the Seventh Ministry of Machine Building, and Huang was appointed director of Institute 12 under the ministry, in charge of developing the control systems for the Dongfeng missiles.

He was transferred to Department 4 in 1970 and later took charge of the development of JL-1, China's first submarine-launched ballistic missile (SLBM). His team solved a host of technical issues besetting the program, which was developed without Soviet assistance after the Sino-Soviet split. Under Huang's leadership, the team developed subsystems such as underwater launching, high-altitude control, real-time calculations, aiming, and miniaturization, which altogether enabled China to become the fourth country in the world to successfully launch an SLBM. He also contributed to the development of China's second generation of ICBMs.

Huang died on 23 November 2011 in Beijing, at the age of 94.

== Honours and recognition ==
Huang was elected an academician of the International Academy of Astronautics in 1986 and of the Chinese Academy of Sciences in 1991.

Huang was conferred a Special Prize of the State Science and Technology Progress Award in 1985 and the Qiu Shi Distinguished Scientist Prize in 1994.

In 1999, Huang was awarded the Two Bombs, One Satellite Meritorious Medal. In 2006, he was one of the five scientists who received the Highest Achievement Award for the first 50 years of China's aerospace industry, together with Qian Xuesen, Ren Xinmin, Tu Shou'e, and Liang Shoupan.
