= Pan Liang =

- 潘良

Chairperson of the Board of Supervisors for State-owned Key Large Enterprises
- In office May 2010 – November 2018
- Premier: Wen Jiabao→Li Keqiang

Personal details
- Born: September 1956 (age 69) Nanjing, Jiangsu, China
- Party: Chinese Communist Party (expelled in 2026)

Pan Liang (Chinese: 潘良; pinyin: Pān Liáng; born September 1956) is a retired Chinese politician who served as deputy ministerial level official in the State-owned Assets Supervision and Administration Commission of the State Council and before that, chairperson of the Board of Supervisors for State-owned Key Large Enterprises. He was investigated by China's top anti-graft agency in December 2025.

== Early life and education ==
Pan was born in Nanjing, Jiangsu, in September 1956.

== Career ==
Pan successively served as a cadre in the Labor and Personnel Department and the General Office of the Ministry of Aerospace Industry, deputy division director, division director, deputy director, and director of the Second Secretariat of the General Office of the State Council. In May 2010, he was promoted to become chairperson of the Board of Supervisors for State-owned Key Large Enterprises, a position he held until November 2018, when he was appointed deputy ministerial level official in the State-owned Assets Supervision and Administration Commission of the State Council.

== Investigation ==
On 12 December 2025, Pan was placed under investigation for "serious violations of laws and regulations" by the Central Commission for Discipline Inspection (CCDI), the party's internal disciplinary body, and the National Supervisory Commission, the highest anti-corruption agency of China. Pan was expelled from the party on 8 June 2026.

Government offices
Preceded by	Chairperson of the Board of Supervisors for State-owned Key Large Enterprises; 2010–2018	Succeeded by
