= Ministry of the Electronics Industry =

Ministry of the Electronics Industry may refer to:

- Ministry of the Electronics Industry (China)
- Ministry of the Electronics Industry (Soviet Union)

== See also ==
- Ministry of Electronics and Information Technology (India)
