= Eighth Ministry of Machine-Building Industry =

Chinese office overseeing the defense industry

The Eighth Ministry of Machine-Building Industry of the PRC (中华人民共和国第八机械工业部) was one of the central offices in the People's Republic of China, established in 1964, which inter alia oversaw the defense industry.

In November 1970 merged with the First Ministry of Machine-Building Industry, and partly with the Ministry of Agriculture and Forestry.

Again, the Ministry appointed 13 September 1979, while on September 10, 1981, was absorbed by the Seventh Ministry of Machine-Building Industry.
