= Zhu Yuli =

Chinese politician and aerospace executive (1934–2020)

Zhu Yuli (Chinese: 朱育理; February 1934 – 8 January 2020) was a Chinese politician and aerospace executive. He served as director of the State Bureau of Technological Supervision (1990–1992), vice minister of the Ministry of Astronautics Industry (1992–1993), and general manager of the state-owned Aviation Industry Corporation of China (1993–1999).

== Early life and education ==
Zhu was born in February 1934 in Rugao, Jiangsu, Republic of China. After graduating from the Harbin Institute of Technology in 1954, he studied at the Moscow Machine Tool Institute in the Soviet Union, graduating in 1959.

== Career ==
After returning to China, Zhu served as director of the 625 Institute of the Third Ministry of Machine Building. During the Cultural Revolution (1966–1976), his father, who had been a high-ranking official, was denounced as a "capitalist roader". Zhu himself was persecuted as a "counterrevolutionary" for his opposition to the Cultural Revolution. He suffered beatings which caused permanent disability in his right hand, forcing him to write with his left hand for the rest of his life.

After his political rehabilitation, Zhu served as deputy director of the Science and Technology Bureau of the Ministry of Astronautics Industry from 1984 to 1987, as director of the State Bureau of Technological Supervision from 1990 to 1992, and as vice minister of the Ministry of Astronautics Industry from 1992 to 1993. In 1993, he was appointed general manager of the state-owned Aviation Industry Corporation of China, serving until 1999.

He was a member of the 14th Central Commission for Discipline Inspection (1992–1997) and a member of the 15th Central Committee of the Chinese Communist Party (1997–2002). He also served as a Standing Committee member of the 9th National People's Congress (1998–2003) and as deputy director of the Environmental Protection and Resources Conservation Committee of the 10th National People's Congress. He was the 5th and 6th president of the China Society of Aeronautics and Astronautics, and became a lifetime honorary president afterwards.

== Death ==
Zhu died on 8 January 2020 in Beijing, aged 85.
