= Mo Wenxiang =

Chinese politician

- 莫文祥

Minister of Aviation Industry
- In office April 1982 – 1988
- Premier: Zhao Ziyang; Li Peng
- Preceded by: New title
- Succeeded by: Lin Zongtang

Personal details
- Born: Mo Guangyou (莫广有); October 1923 Xiajin County, Shandong, China
- Died: 12 March 2013 (aged 89) Beijing, China
- Party: Chinese Communist Party

Mo Wenxiang (Chinese: 莫文祥; pinyin: Mò Wénxiáng; October 1923 – 12 March 2013) was a Chinese politician who served as Minister of Aviation Industry in the early 1980s and retired in 1999.

He was a representative of the 12th and 13th National Congress of the Chinese Communist Party and a member of the 12th Central Committee of the Chinese Communist Party. He was a delegate to the 1st, 7th and 8th National People's Congress. He was a member of the Standing Committee of the 7th and 8th National People's Congress.

== Biography ==
Mo was born Mo Guangyou (莫广有) in Zhaozhuang Township, Xiajin County, Shandong, in October 1923. Mo joined the Communist Revolution in 1938 and joined the Chinese Communist Party (CCP) in July of the same year.

During the Second Sino-Japanese War, he served in the Shanxi-Suiyuan Military District. During the Chinese Civil War, he successively served as a staff member of the General Political Department of the Northeast Democratic United Army, political commissar of the 3rd Arsenal of the Military Industry Department of the 4th Field Army, and deputy director of the 53rd Arsenal of the Military Industry Department of the Northeast Military Region.

After the founding of the Communist State in 1949, he was appointed party secretary of Shenyang No. 53 Factory, factory director of the No. 111 Factory, and factory director of the No. 410 Factory, responsible for military production. He was factory director of Shenyang Songling Machinery Factory in 1961 and subsequently secretary of the Secretariat of the CCP Shenyang Municipal Committee two years later.

During the Cultural Revolution, he suffered political persecution. He was reinstated in 1972 as deputy director of Shenyang Municipal Revolutionary Committee and director of National Defense Industry Office. In 1982, he was chosen as minister of the newly founded Ministry of Aerospace Industry. He retired in 1999.

On 12 March 2013, he died in Beijing, at the age of 89.

Government offices
New title	Minister of Aviation Industry; 1982–1988	Succeeded by Lin Zongtang
