= Liao Luyan =

Chinese politician (1913–1972)

- 廖鲁言

Minister of Agriculture
- In office September 1954 – June 1970
- Premier: Zhou Enlai
- Preceded by: Li Shucheng
- Succeeded by: Sha Feng

Personal details
- Born: Liao Guang'ao (廖广鏖); 1913 Nanjing, Jiangsu, China
- Died: 1972 (aged 58–59) Beijing, China
- Party: Chinese Communist Party
- Education: Beijing Army Medical University

Chinese name
- Simplified Chinese: 廖鲁言
- Traditional Chinese: 廖魯言
Transcriptions
Standard Mandarin
- Hanyu Pinyin: Liào Lǔyán

Liao Guang'ao
- Simplified Chinese: 廖广鏖
- Traditional Chinese: 廖廣鏖
Transcriptions
Standard Mandarin
- Hanyu Pinyin: Liào Guǎng'áo

Liao Luyan (Chinese: 廖鲁言; 1913 – 19 November 1972) was a Chinese politician who served as Minister of Agriculture from 1954 to 1970. He was a delegate to the 1st and 2nd National People's Congress. He was a representative of the 7th National Congress of the Chinese Communist Party. He was a member of the 3rd and 4th National Committee of the Chinese People's Political Consultative Conference. He was an alternate member of the 8th Central Committee of the Chinese Communist Party.

== Biography ==
Liao was born Liao Guang'ao (廖广鏖) into a family of merchants, in Nanjing, Jiangsu, in 1913. Before graduating from high school in 1929, he was expelled by the school for participating in student movements. In 1930, he enrolled at Beiping Army Medical University and participated in the Leftist Writers Alliance during his time at school.

He joined the Chinese Communist Party (CCP) in 1932. In July 1932, he led and organized the student movement in Beiping. In August, he was arrested and imprisoned by the Kuomintang for betrayal. In November 1936, he was rescued by the party organization and was sent to north China's Shanxi province to serve as an editor in the editorial office of the Taiyuan Counter-Japanese Military and Political Training Committee.

At the end of 1939, he was transferred to Yan'an and appointed deputy director and Section Chief of the Friendship Department of the United Front Work Department. He was a member of the Friendly Forces Working Committee of the CCP Central Committee in August 1942 and subsequently director of the Party Affairs Group of the Party Affairs Research Office of the CCP Central Committee in the spring of 1944. In April 1946, he became director of the Party Affairs Research Office of the CCP Central Research Bureau. Two months later, he served as a member of the Central Committee of the CCP's Legal Issues Research Committee. In June 1947, he participated in the Land Reform Movement in the Shanxi-Chahaer-Hebei Liberated Area. At the end of 1947, he was chosen as the secretary of Liu Shaoqi, a member of the Political Bureau of the CCP Central Committee and secretary of the Secretariat of the CCP Central Committee. He became secretary-general of the Policy Research Office of the CCP Central Committee in 1948.

After the founding of the Communist State in 1949, he was made deputy director of the Counselor's Office of the State Council of China. He was elevated to deputy secretary-general of the State Council in August 1952. He was appointed minister of agriculture in September 1954, in addition to serving as deputy director of the 7th Office of the State Council.

In September 1964, he was transferred to Shijiazhuang, capital of Hebei province, and appointed party secretary, the top political position in the city.

During the Cultural Revolution, he was brought to be persecuted and suffered political persecution. He died on 19 November 1972, at the age of 59.

Government offices
Preceded by Li Shucheng	Minister of Agriculture; 1954–1970	Succeeded by Sha Feng
