= Tu Shou'e =

Chinese aerospace engineer

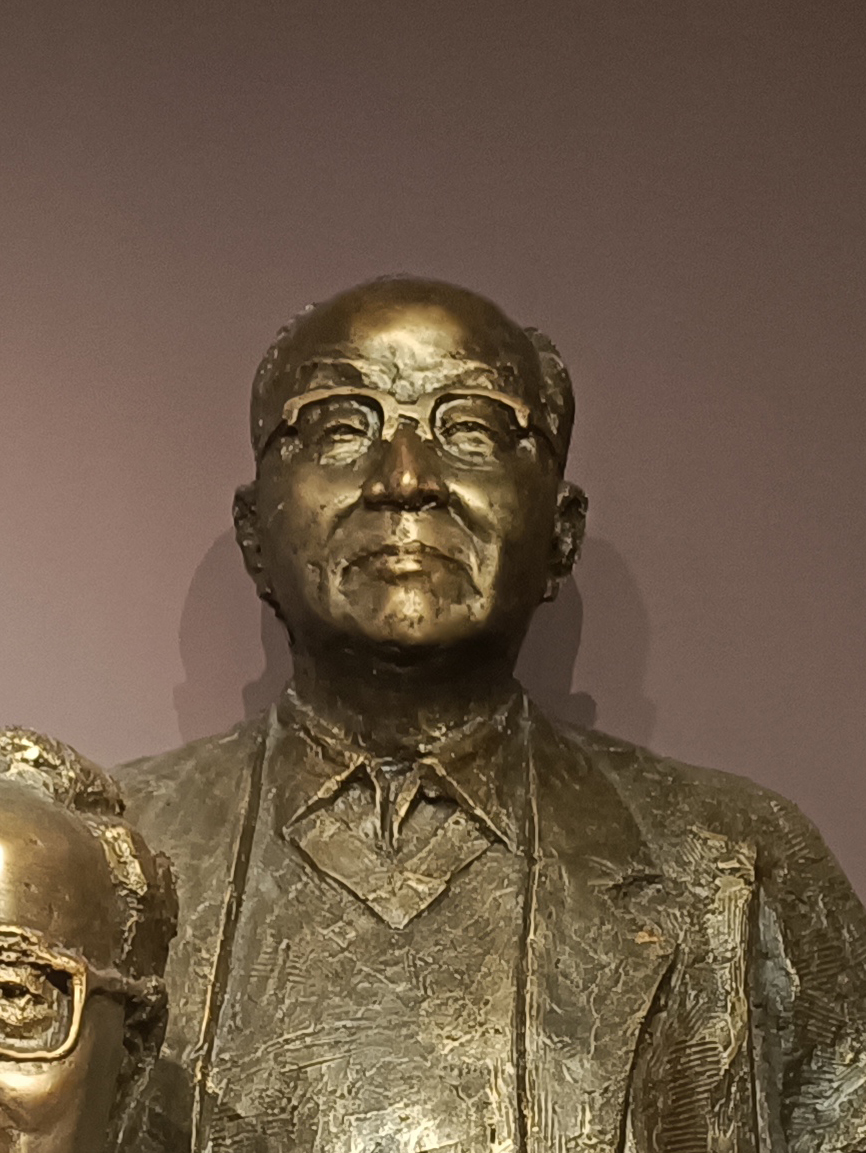
- Southwest United Nations General Assembly Museum - Tu Shouyi Statue
- Born: December 5, 1917; Huzhou, Zhejiang, China
- Died: December 15, 2012 (aged 95); Beijing, China
- Education: Southwestern Associated University; Massachusetts Institute of Technology
- Known for: participant in the Two Bombs, One Satellite Project
- Scientific career
- Fields: Aeronautics
- Workplaces: Southwestern Associated University; Tsinghua University; Beijing Institute of Aeronautics; China Aerospace Science & Technology Corporation

Chinese name
- Traditional Chinese: 屠守鍔
- Simplified Chinese: 屠守锷
Transcriptions
Standard Mandarin
- Hanyu Pinyin: Tú Shǒu'è
- Wade–Giles: T'u Shou-o

Tu Shou'e or Shou-ngo Tu (Chinese: 屠守锷; 1917–2012) was a Chinese aerospace engineer who was a specialist in structural mechanics. Tu is famous as the chief designer of the Long March 2 rocket and China's intercontinental ballistic missile.

Together with Liang Shoupan, Huang Weilu and Ren Xinmin, Tu is considered one of the "Four Elders of China's Aerospace". He was granted the Two Bombs, One Satellite Merit Medal in 1999. Tu was elected a member of the Chinese Academy of Sciences in 1991.

== Early life and education ==
Tu was born in Nanxun, Huzhou, Zhejiang in 1917. After completing his primary education in Zhejiang, he studied at Shanghai High School. The pervading sense of Japanese menace germinated an idea in his mind that China should have the independent capacity to manufacture planes. He was admitted to Tsinghua University in 1936 and entered its Aeronautical Engineering Department in 1938.

== Career ==
After graduation, Tu worked at an aeronautical institute in Chengdu. He went to MIT in 1941 with full scholarship and received a master's degree there. Then Tu served Curtiss-Wright Corporation as a stress analyst, but he returned to China following the surrender of Japan in 1945, teaching at his alma mater as an associate professor and then as a professor.

Tu reached Beijing after the university. Since the Adjustment of University Colleges & Departments in 1952, he was assigned to Beijing Aviation Institute. He had served successively as vice dean, dean and the assistant of president there.

Later Tu was invited to serve the Fifth Academy of the Ministry of Defence in 1957. From then on, Tu plunged himself into Chinese missile and aerospace projects, especially its system design aspect. He was the deputy chief designer of Dongfeng 2 and Dongfeng 3, also the chief designer of Dongfeng 5 and Long March 2. He made several significant breakthroughs in the field.

The vicissitudes of his life in the decade never rob his enthusiasm for search. He once completely absorbed in the formula during a struggle session, ignoring the impassioned speech.

Tu felt very sorry for the Columbia disaster in 2003, but he also insisted that the progress of space science is unstoppable, while China "is still on track to launch its first manned spacecraft".

== Personal ==
Tu joined in the CPC in 1948.

Tu enjoyed tai chi and classic music. He and his wife, Qiu Su (Chinese: 秋粟), had five children.
