= Liu Jiang (politician) =

Chinese politician (born 1940)

- 刘江

Minister of Agriculture
- In office March 1993 – March 1998
- Premier: Li Peng
- Preceded by: Liu Zhongyi
- Succeeded by: Chen Yaobang

Personal details
- Born: April 1940 (age 86) Beijing, China
- Party: Chinese Communist Party
- Education: Shihezi University; Central Party School of the Chinese Communist Party

Chinese name
- Traditional Chinese: 劉江
- Simplified Chinese: 刘江
Transcriptions
Standard Mandarin
- Hanyu Pinyin: Liǘ Jiāng
- Wade–Giles: Liu Chiang

Liu Jiang (Chinese: 刘江; born April 1940) is a retired Chinese politician who served as Minister of Agriculture between 1993 and 1998.

Liu was a member of the 15th Central Committee of the Chinese Communist Party and 16th Committee of the Central Commission for Discipline Inspection. He was also a member of the 10th National Committee of the Chinese People's Political Consultative Conference and a member of the 11th Standing Committee of the Chinese People's Political Consultative Conference.

== Biography ==
Liu was born in Beijing in April 1940. In December 1964 he graduated from the College of Agriculture in Xinjiang Production and Construction Corps (now Shihezi University), where he majored in animal husbandry. After gradation, he was assigned to Tibet Military District, where he worked until August 1972.

In August 1972, Liu became a technician at Beijing Municipal Animal Husbandry and Veterinary Station, five years later he was promoted to become its deputy director.

Liu was the head of Beijing Red Star Chicken Farm in December 1979, and held that office until July 1982.

In 1982 he was promoted to become director of the Bureau of Animal Industry in Beijing, a position he held until 1986.

In January 1986, he was appointed vice-minister of Agriculture, he remained in that position until November 1990, when he appointed deputy director of the State Planning Commission.

He rose to become minister of Agriculture in March 1993, and served until March 1998.

He served as deputy director the National Development and Reform Commission from March 1998 to March 2003, and again from March 2003 to August 2005.

In February 2005 he was appointed deputy director of the Committee for Ethnic and Religious Affairs, an institution under the jurisdiction of the Chinese People's Political Consultative Conference.

Government offices
Preceded by Liu Zhongyi	Minister of Agriculture; 1993–1998	Succeeded by Chen Yaobang
