= Zhang Shiying =

Chinese philosopher (born 1921)

Zhang Shiying (张世英; born 1921) is a Chinese philosopher. He became a philosophy professor at Peking University in 1952. He began doing research into German Idealism in the 1950s. He emphasized God as a material force in order to justify his analysis into Hegel's theology. In 1972 he published a materialist analysis of Hegel that was translated and commented upon by Alain Badiou. In opposition to the Idealist System, Hegelian Contradiction was interpreted in light of the theory of One Divides Into Two. Since the 1970s he has written works in dialogue with the broader stream of Continental Philosophy, including Husserl and Derrida.

== Sources ==
Negativity and Dialectical Materialism: Zhang Shiying's Reading of Hegel's Dialectical Logic Peter Button

The Rational Kernel of the Hegelian Dialectic Alain Badiou Tzuchien Tho (ed. and trans.)
