= Zhang Huaixi =

Chinese politician

Zhang Huaixi (Chinese: 张怀西; born February 1935) was a Chinese male politician, who served as the vice chairperson of the Chinese People's Political Consultative Conference.
