= Sixth Ministry of Machine-Building Industry =

The Sixth Ministry of Machine-Building Industry of the PRC (中华人民共和国第六机械工业部), one of the central offices in the People's Republic of China, was created on September 2, 1963. It oversaw the shipbuilding industry.

After Cultural Revolution the first information about its business, already as a Ministry of Shipbuilding, from June 1970. In May 1982, was closed and converted into the China Shipbuilding Corp., July 1, 1999 which was divided into two organisms, the:

- China Shipbuilding Industry Corp. - CSIC in Beijing,
- China State Shipbuilding Corp. - CSSC in Shanghai.

In 1950, the first aid the Chinese shipbuilding industry has given the Soviet Union. In 1986, China had 523 yards, 160 factories manufacturing facilities, 540,000 employees and more than 80 offices and scientific research.

The main shipbuilding centers are Shanghai (Jiangnan Shipyard), Dalian (Dalian Shipbuilding Co.), Tianjin, Guangzhou and Wuhan.

== Bibliography ==
- Malcolm Lamb: Directory of officials and Organizations in China, ME Sharpe Inc. Armonk, NY, 2003, p. 1911 +, ISBN 0-7656-1020-5, Volume 1
- China's Economic System, Routledge Abingdon 2005, 594 p., ISBN 0-415-36147-8
