= Minister of Agriculture and Rural Affairs =

Minister of the People's Republic of China

Minister of Agriculture and Rural Affairs of the People's Republic of China Civil service of China
- 中华人民共和国农业农村部
- National Emblem of China

- Flag of China

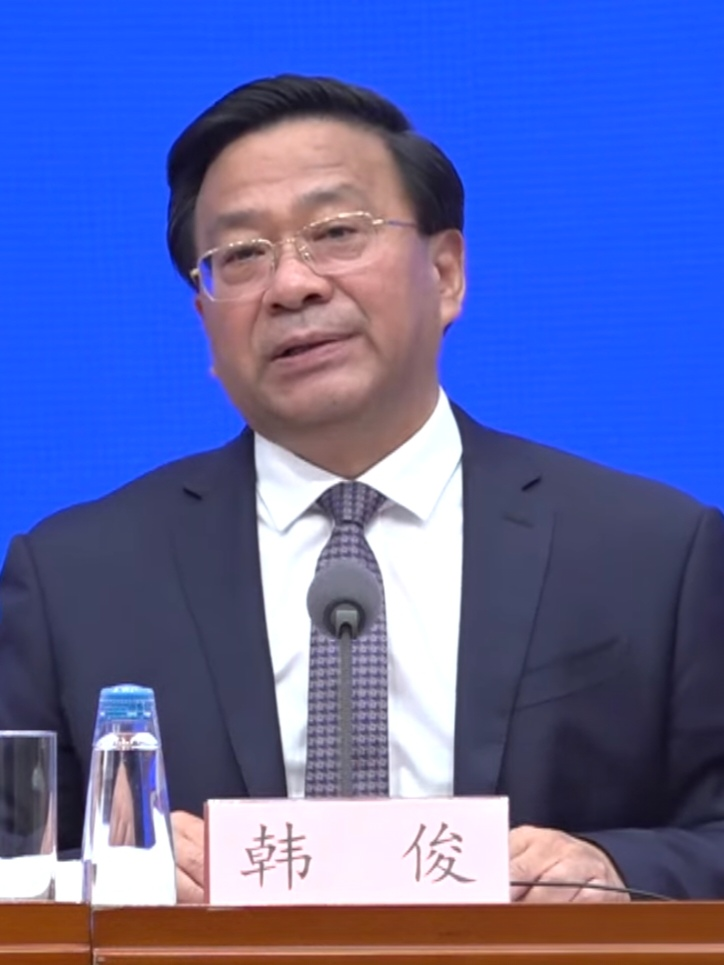
- Incumbent; Han Jun since 13 September 2024
- Ministry of Agriculture and Rural Affairs
- Status: Provincial and ministerial-level official
- Member of: Plenary Meeting of the State Council
- Seat: Ministry of Agriculture And Rural Affairs Building, Chaoyang District, Beijing
- Nominator: Premier (chosen within the Chinese Communist Party)
- Appointer: President; with the confirmation of the National People's Congress or its Standing Committee
- Formation: 19 October 1949; 76 years ago
- First holder: Li Shucheng
- Deputy: Vice Minister of Agriculture and Rural Affairs

The minister of agriculture and rural affairs of the People's Republic of China is the head of the Ministry of Agriculture and Rural Affairs of the People's Republic of China and a member of the State Council. Within the State Council, the position is eighteenth in order of precedence. The minister is responsible for leading the ministry, presiding over its meetings, and signing important documents related to the ministry. Officially, the minister is nominated by the premier of the State Council, who is then approved by the National People's Congress or its Standing Committee and appointed by the president.

The minister since June 2004 is Han Jun, who concurrently serves as the Chinese Communist Party Committee Secretary of the ministry.

== List of ministers ==
=== Minister of Agriculture ===
No.	Portrait	Name	Term of office		Ref.
No.	Portrait	Name	Took office	Left office	Ref.
1		Li Shucheng	October 1949	September 1954	
2		Liao Luyan	September 1954	1966	
—		acting Jiang Yizhen	September 1964	May 1966	
Post abolished
3		Sha Feng (沙风)	June 1970	January 1978	
4		Yang Ligong (杨立功)	January 1978	February 1979	
5		Huo Shilian	February 1979	March 1981	
6		Lin Hujia	March 1981	June 1983	
7		He Kang	June 1983	June 1990	
8		Liu Zhongyi	June 1990	March 1992	
9		Liu Jiang	March 1992	March 1998	
10		Chen Yaobang	March 1998	August 2001	
11		Du Qinglin	August 2001	December 2006	
12		Sun Zhengcai	December 2006	November 2009	
13		Han Changfu	December 2009	March 2018	

=== Minister of Agriculture and Rural Affairs ===
No.	Portrait	Name (Birth–Death)	Term of office		Ref.
No.	Portrait	Name (Birth–Death)	Took office	Left office	Ref.
1		Han Changfu 韩长赋 (born 1954)	19 March 2018	December 2020	
2		Tang Renjian 唐仁健 (born 1962)	26 December 2020	28 June 2024	
3		Han Jun 韩俊 (born 1963)	28 June 2024	Incumbent	
