= Liu Zhongyi =

Chinese politician (1930–2020)

- 刘中一

Minister of Agriculture of China
- In office June 1990 – April 1993
- Premier: Li Peng
- Preceded by: He Kang
- Succeeded by: Liu Jiang

Personal details
- Born: October 1930 Wuhan, Hubei, China
- Died: January 5, 2020 (aged 89) Beijing, China
- Party: Chinese Communist Party
- Education: Zhongyuan University

Liu Zhongyi (Chinese: 刘中一; October 1930 – 5 January 2020) was a Chinese politician who served as Minister of Agriculture from 1990 to 1993 and Vice Minister of the National Development and Reform Commission from 1985 to 1990.

== Biography ==
Liu was born in October 1930 in Wuhan, Hubei, Republic of China. He also used the names Liu Xinglu (刘兴鲁) and Liu Youting (刘佑庭). In February 1949, he enlisted in the People's Liberation Army during the Chinese Civil War.

After the founding of the People's Republic of China in 1949, he studied statistics at Zhongyuan University (中原大学) from 1951 to 1952, and joined the Chinese Communist Party in October 1954. From May 1956, he worked in the hydraulics department of the State Planning Commission. During the Cultural Revolution, he was sent to the countryside to perform manual labor.

In 1978, he was appointed Deputy Director of the Agriculture, Forestry and Water Conservancy Planning Bureau of the National Development and Reform Commission (NDRC), and was promoted to Director in 1982. He was promoted to Vice Minister of the NDRC in 1985. In June 1990, he was appointed Minister of Agriculture, serving until April 1993, when he became Deputy Director of the Development Research Center of the State Council.

Liu was a member of the 14th Central Committee of the Chinese Communist Party (1992–1997). From 1998 to 2003 he was a Standing Committee member of the 9th National People's Congress, and served as Vice Chairman of the National People's Congress Agriculture and Rural Affairs Committee.

Liu died on 5 January 2020 in Beijing, aged 89.
