= Li Shucheng =

Chinese politician (1882–1965)

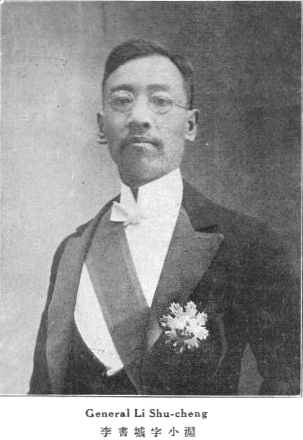

Minister of Agriculture
- In office 1949–1954
- Preceded by: None
- Succeeded by: Liao Luyan

Personal details
- Born: 1882
- Died: 1965 (aged 82–83)
- Party: Chinese Communist Party
- Awards: Order of Wen-Hu

Li Shucheng (Chinese: 李書城; 1882–1965) was a senior leader of Kuomintang, and a politician of the People's Republic of China.

In 1921, the first National Congress of the Chinese Communist Party was held in his house in Shanghai, thus the CCP was founded with his brother Li Hanjun.

After the establishment of the People's Republic of China, Li served as the first Minister of Agriculture of PRC.

Government offices
Preceded by None	Minister of Agriculture of the People's Republic of China; 1949–1954	Succeeded by Liao Luyan
