= He Kang =

Chinese politician (1923–2021)

- 何康
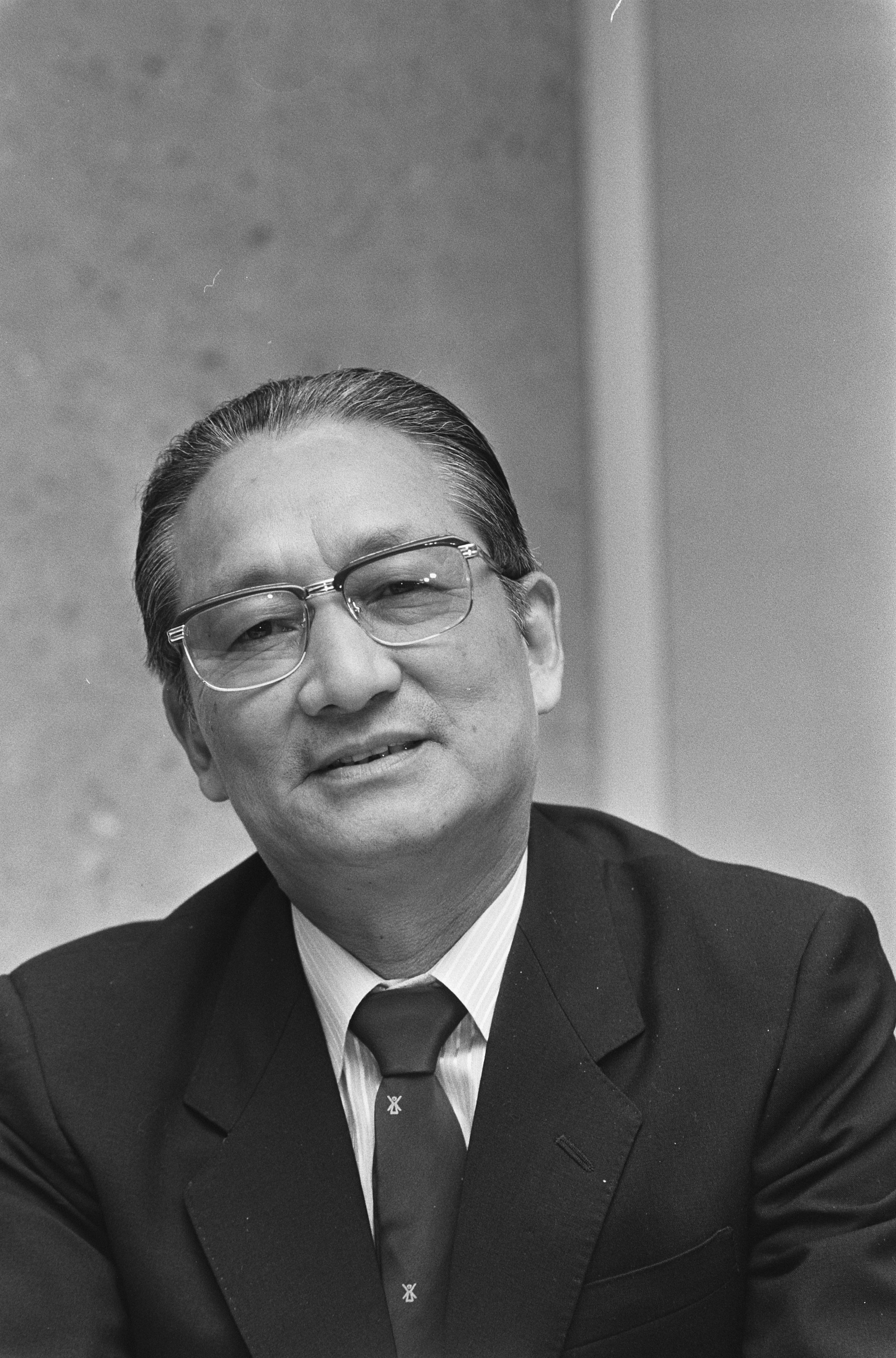
- He in 1986

Minister of Agriculture of China
- In office 1988–1990
- Premier: Li Peng
- Preceded by: New title
- Succeeded by: Liu Zhongyi

Minister of Agriculture, Animal Husbandry and Fisheries
- In office 1983–1988
- Premier: Li Peng
- Preceded by: Lin Hujia
- Succeeded by: Position revoked

Personal details
- Born: February 1923 Fuzhou, Fujian, China
- Died: 3 July 2021 (aged 98) Beijing, China
- Party: Chinese Communist Party
- Spouse: Miao Xixia
- Parent(s): He Sui; Chen Kunli
- Education: Guangxi University

He Kang (Chinese: 何康; pinyin: Hé Kāng; February 1923 – 3 July 2021) was a Chinese politician who served as minister of Agriculture between 1988 and 1990 and minister of Agriculture, Animal Husbandry and Fisheries between 1983 and 1988. He served as vice president of the China Association for Science and Technology on two occasions, 1986–1995 and 1995–2000. He was a member of the 12th and 13th Central Committee of the Chinese Communist Party.

== Early life and education ==
He was born in Fuzhou, Fujian, in February 1923, the third son of He Sui, a military officer and politician, and Chen Kunli (陈坤立). He has five siblings. His eldest brother He Shiyong (何世庸) was also a politician who entirely worked in south China's Guangdong province. After graduating from Nanjing Jinling High School, he entered Mawei Naval School, but dropped out in the following year. In 1938, he entered Tianjin Nankai High School, which was relocated in Chongqing due to the Japanese aggression. In 1939, due to the impact of his family, he joined the Chinese Communist Party. In 1941, the New Fourth Army incident broke out, he dropped out of school after receiving order from the party, and he was accepted to Guanghua University in Chengdu. At that time, Bai Chongxi and Li Jishen asked his father to serve as general consultant of Guilin Military Camp, he accompanied his father to Guilin, where he was admitted to Guangxi University. He studied economics at the beginning, but switched to agriculture later.

== Career in Shanghai ==
After graduating in 1946, he returned to Nanking, meeting Dong Biwu, who was about to return to the liberated areas. Soon after, the contact person took him to meet Qian Ying, director of the Organization Department of the Shanghai Bureau of the Chinese Communist Party. Under the financial support of the Shanghai Bureau of the CCP Central Committee, He Sui co-founded the Ruiming Company (瑞明公司) with Miao Qiujie. He Kang was despatched to the company and appointed general manager, his future wife Miao Xixia was made financial director. In May 1945, Shanghai was controlled by the People's Liberation Army. He was appointed director of the Agriculture and Forestry Department of Shanghai Military Regulatory Commission and deputy director of the Agriculture and Forestry Department of East China Military and Political Commission.

== Career in Guangdong ==
After the establishment of the Communist State, in 1952, he became director of Special Forestry Department of Forestry Ministry. After the outbreak of the Korea War, the United States imposed a blockade and embargo on China, resulting in a serious shortage of natural rubber as military supplies. In order to develop rubber business, he left for Guangzhou, and then moved to Hainan Island. In 1957, he was president and party chief of South China Academy of Tropical Crops (now Chinese Academy of Tropical Agricultural Sciences) and president and party chief of South China College of Tropical Crops (now Hainan University), concurrently holding the deputy director of General Administration of land reclamation of Guangdong position since 1971.

== Career in Beijing ==
In January 1978, he was transferred to Beijing and appointed vice minister of Forestry, which was reshuffled as Ministry of Agriculture, Animal Husbandry and Fisheries in May 1983. He was also deputy director of the State Agricultural Commission and deputy director of State Planning Commission. In May 1983, he rose to become minister of the newly founded Ministry of Agriculture, Animal Husbandry and Fisheries, which was regrouped as Ministry of Agriculture in April 1988. During his term in office, he carried out the agricultural reform and made the growth of agricultural products reach 8% in the 1980s. He also set up the Agricultural Research Institute and promoted the agricultural reform in China, which won him the World Food Prize in 1993. He was elected vice president of the China Association for Science and Technology on 28 June 1986, and was re-elected on 27 May 1995. In 1986, he received an honorary doctor of science degree from the University of Maryland. In 1993, he became a member of the 8th Standing Committee of the National People's Congress and a consultant to the Food and Agriculture Organization.

On 3 July 2021, he died in Beijing, aged 98.

== Personal life ==
He married Miao Xixia (缪希霞), who he met at the Ruiming Company in Shanghai. She was daughter of Miao Qiujie (缪秋杰), a politician in the Nationalist government.

== Works ==
- 何康文集 [Collected Works of He Kang] (in Chinese). Beijing: People's Publishing House. 2014. ISBN 9787010131443.

Government offices
Preceded by Lin Hujia	Minister of Agriculture, Animal Husbandry and Fisheries; 1983–1988	Position revoked
New title	Minister of Agriculture of China; 1988–1990	Succeeded by Liu Zhongyi

Honorary titles
Preceded by Edward F. Knipling	World Food Prize; 1993	Succeeded by Muhammad Yunus
