= Fifth Ministry of Machine-Building Industry =

The Fifth Ministry of Machine-Building Industry of the PRC (中华人民共和国第五机械工业部) oversees production of tank equipment and artillery. It was created on September 28, 1963.

In 1982, it changed its name to the Ministry of Ordnance Industry.

== Bibliography ==
- Malcolm Lamb: Directory of officials and Organizations in China, ME Sharpe Inc. Armonk, NY, 2003, p. 1911 +, ISBN 0-7656-1020-5, Volume 1
- China's Economic System, Routledge Abingdon 2005, 594 p., ISBN 0-415-36147-8
