= Chen Yaobang =

Chinese politician (born 1935)

Chen Yaobang (Chinese: 陈耀邦; pinyin: Chén Yàobāng; Jyutping: Can^{4} Jiu^{6}-bong^{1}; born December 1935) is a retired politician and former Minister of Agriculture of the People's Republic of China.

== Biography ==
Chen is a native of Panyu District, Guangzhou, Guangdong. He received an undergraduate degree in plant conservation from Huazhong Agricultural Institute (now Huazhong Agricultural University) in 1957, and a graduate degree in plant pathology and agricultural antibiotics in 1966. Chen later served as a teaching assistant at Huazhong Agricultural Institute.

Chen joined the Chinese Communist Party in March 1982. He previously worked as a technician, deputy office head in the Cash Crop Bureau, and deputy bureau chief of the Agriculture Bureau in the Ministry of Agriculture, Husbandry, and Fisheries, the predecessor to the modern Ministry of Agriculture. In 1986, he was named vice minister. In 1993, Chen became vice chairman of the State Planning Commission, and in 1997 he began serving concurrently as Minister of Forestry. He was appointed Minister of Agriculture and Ministry of Agriculture Party Group Secretary in 1998. Chen later became a member of the Standing Committee of the Chinese People's Political Consultative Conference (CPPCC), and vice chairman of the CPPCC Economics Committee.

Government offices
Preceded by Liu Jiang	Minister of Agriculture; 1998–2001	Succeeded by Du Qinglin
