= Ministry of Astronautics Industry =

Former ministry

- 中华人民共和国航空航天工业部; Zhōnghuá Rénmín Gònghéguó Hángkōng Hángtiān Gōngyèbù
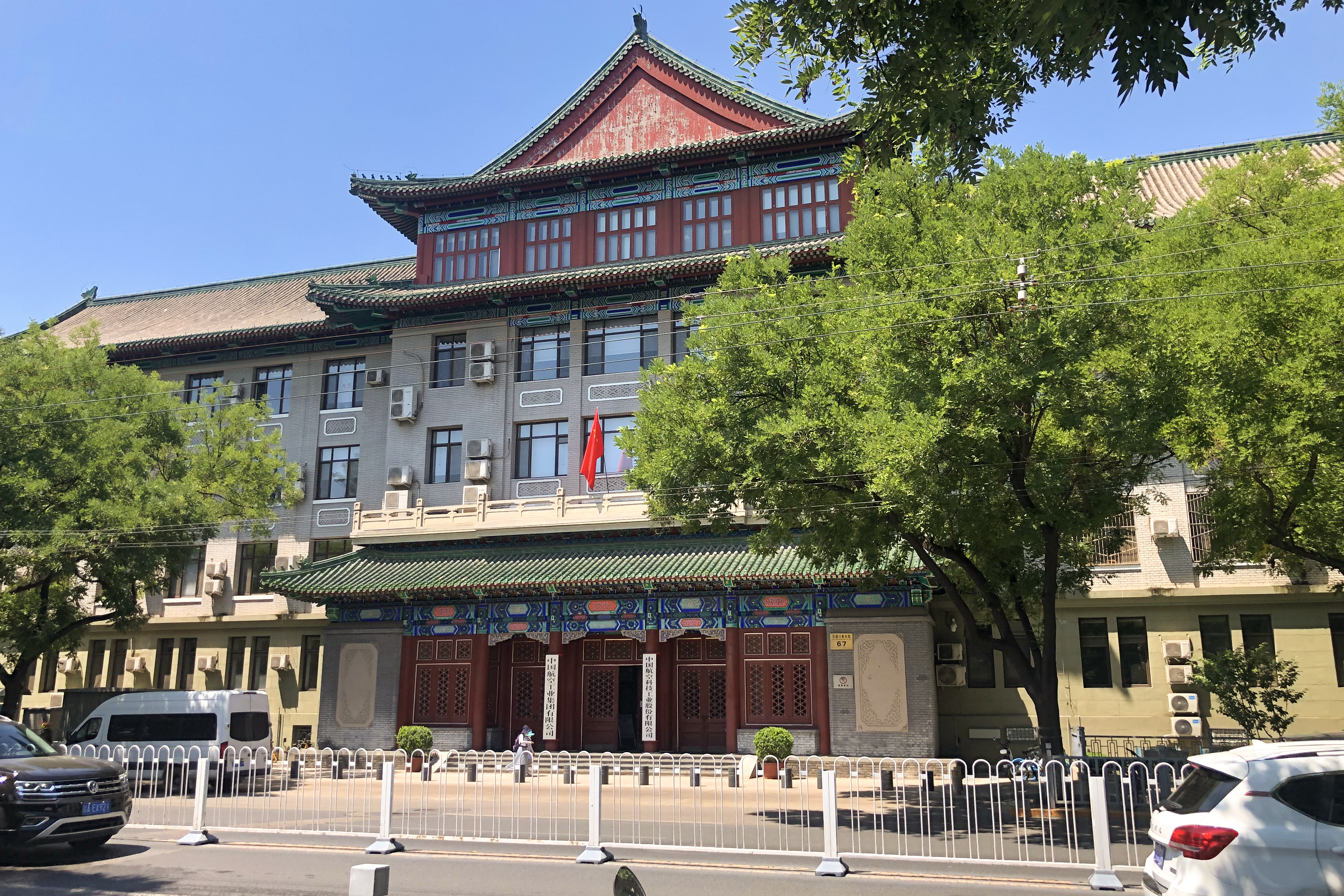

Agency overview
- Formed: April 12, 1988
- Preceding agencies: Ministry of Aviation Industry; Ministry of Aerospace Industry
- Dissolved: March 1993
- Superseding agency: China Aerospace Industry Corporation
- Jurisdiction: China
- Headquarters: Beijing
- Minister responsible: Lin Zongtang
- Parent agency: State Council

Chinese name
- Traditional Chinese: 中華人民共和國航空航天工業部
- Simplified Chinese: 中华人民共和国航空航天工业部
Transcriptions
Standard Mandarin
- Hanyu Pinyin: Zhōnghuá Rénmín Gònghéguó Hángkōng Hángtiān Gōngyèbù

The Ministry of Astronautics Industry of the People's Republic of China (Chinese: 中华人民共和国航空航天工业部) was a ministry of the government of the People's Republic of China which was responsible for the management of research, design and production of rockets, missiles and spacecraft. The ministry was headquartered in Beijing. It existed from 1988 to 1993.

== History ==
On April 12, 1988, the People's Republic of China merged its Ministry of Aviation Industry and Ministry of Aerospace Industry to form the Ministry of Astronautics Industry.

In March 1993, the ministry was disestablished during the institutional reform of the State Council. Its responsibilities were assumed by the China Aerospace Industry Corporation.

== Leaders ==
- Minister: Lin Zongtang
- Vice-Ministers: Jiang Xiesheng, Liu Jiyuan, He Wenyi (何文怡), and Sun Jiadong

== See also ==
- China Aerospace Science and Technology Corporation
- China Aerospace Science and Industry Corporation
