= First Ministry of Machine-Building Industry =

Former government ministry of China

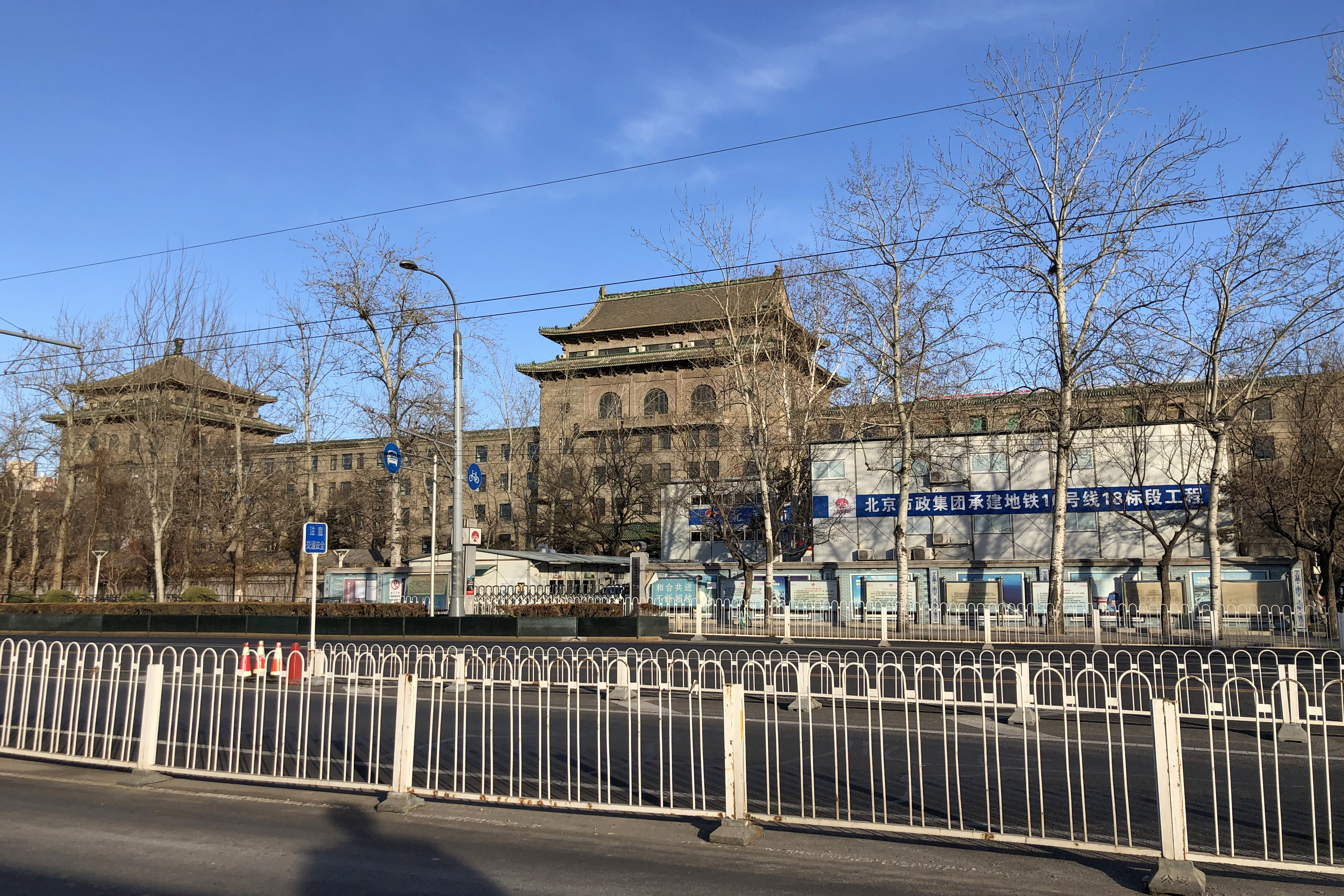
Site of the former First Ministry of Machine Building at 46 Sanlihe Rd, Beijing

The First Ministry of Machine-Building Industry of the People's Republic of China (中华人民共和国第一机械工业部) was one of the central offices in the People's Republic of China. It was responsible for heavy industry.

== History ==
The Ministry was established in August 1952. It was responsible for heavy industry. It continued to operate during and after the Cultural Revolution.

- 1952–1954: The First Ministry of Machinery Industry of the PRC
- 1954–1982: The First Ministry of Machinery Industry
- 1982–1987: Ministry of Machinery Industry
- 1987–1988: State Machinery Industry Committee
- 1988–1993: Ministry of Machinery and Electronic Industry
- 1993–1998: Ministry of Machinery Industry
- From 1998: State Bureau of Machinery Industry
- From 2000: China Machinery Industry Association
- Since 2001: China Machinery Industry Federation

In May 1982, its name was changed to the Ministry of Machinery Industry. In December 1985, the ministry was liquidated upon the creation of the State Machinery Industry Committee. In 1988 it became the Ministry of Mechanical and Electronic Industry, and finally the Ministry of Machinery Industry from 1993 to 1998.

After 1998 the Ministry was abolished and the State Bureau of Machinery Industry was established under the administration of the State Economic and Trade Commission (SETC). Also SETC became defunct and part of the National Development and Reform Commission (NDRC).

The State Bureau of Machinery Industry was replaced in 2000 by the China Machinery Industry Association, which in 2001 was renamed China Machinery Industry Federation.

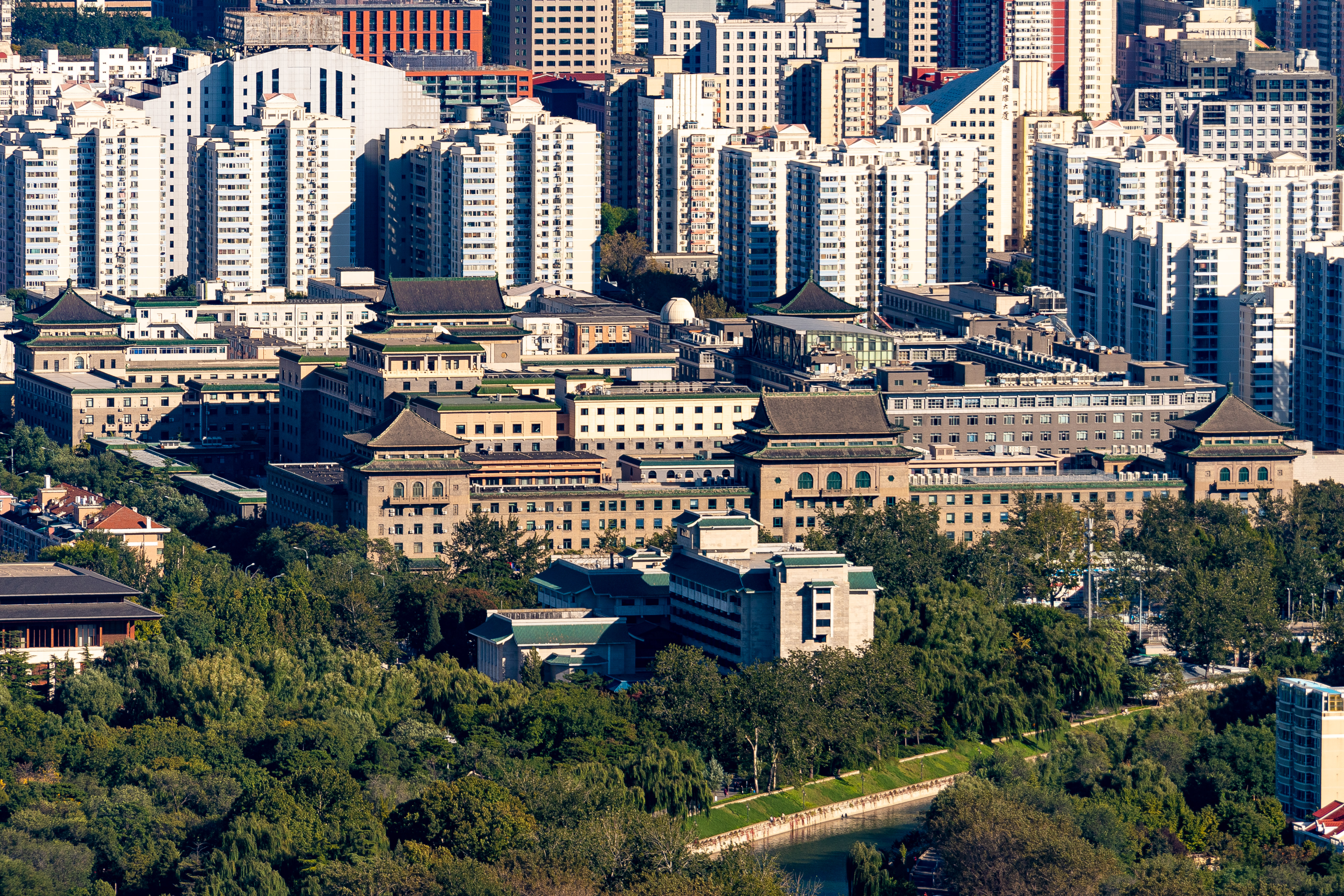
The former Ministry of First Machine Building, which is since 2021 the office area of the National Energy Administration.

== See also ==
- Technological and industrial history of China

== Bibliography ==
- Malcolm Lamb: Directory of officials and Organizations in China, ME Sharpe Inc. Armonk, NY, 2003, p. 1911 +, ISBN 0-7656-1020-5, Volume 1
- China's Economic System, Routledge Abingdon 2005, 594 p., ISBN 0-415-36147-8
