= Third Ministry of Machine-Building Industry =

Former PRC Ministry Overseeing Aviation

The Third Ministry of Machine-Building Industry of the People's Republic of China (中华人民共和国第三机械工业部) was a former government ministry of China which oversaw the aviation industry.

== History ==
In February 1958, China's Third Ministry of Machine Building (which had been established in November 1956 to oversee China's nuclear weapons program) was renamed the Second Ministry of Machine Building.As the Second Ministry, it continued to have responsibility for nuclear weapons design. The "new" Third Ministry contemporaneously created was responsible for aviation.

In April 1988 it became part of the newly created Ministry of Aerospace Industry.

At the close cooperation with the Soviet Union ministry was responsible for launching the production supplied by Soviet fighters F-2 (MiG-15), J-4 (MiG-17), JS (MiG-17PF) and J-6 (MiG-19) and bombers, H-5 (Il-28) and H-6 (Tu-16). Also launched its own production of J-7 fighter (MiG-21).

Modern aircraft factories in: Shenyang (J-4, J-5, J-6, J-7, J-8, J-11), Xi'an (H-6, H-8), Harbin (H-5) and Chengdu (J-7).

== Bibliography ==
- Malcolm Lamb: Directory of officials and Organizations in China, ME Sharpe Inc. Armonk, NY, 2003, p. 1911 +, ISBN 0-7656-1020-5, Volume 1
- China's Economic System, Routledge Abingdon 2005, 594 p., ISBN 0-415-36147-8
