= Fourth Ministry of Machine-Building Industry =

The Fourth Ministry of Machine-Building Industry (中华人民共和国第四机械工业部), one of the central offices in the People's Republic of China, who oversaw the electronics industry.

It was established in 1963. In March 1993, became part of the Ministry of Machine Building and Electronics Industries. In March 1998, an independent Ministry of the Electronics Industry.

== Bibliography ==
- Malcolm Lamb: Directory of officials and Organizations in China, ME Sharpe Inc. Armonk, NY, 2003, p. 1911 +, ISBN 0-7656-1020-5, Volume 1
- China's Economic System, Routledge Abingdon 2005, 594 p., ISBN 0-415-36147-8
