= Ministry of Aerospace Industry =

Defunct Chinese government agency

Agency overview
- Formed: 1956
- Dissolved: 1988
- Superseding agency: Ministry of Astronautics Industry

The Ministry of Aerospace Industry of the People's Republic of China (simplified Chinese: 中华人民共和国航天工业部; traditional Chinese: 中華人民共和國航天工業部; pinyin: Zhōnghuá Rénmín Gònghéguó Hángtiān Gōngyèbù) was a government ministry of China from 1956 to 1988. The ministry was responsible for managing the Chinese space program. In 1988, the ministry was succeeded by the Ministry of Astronautics Industry, which was split into the China National Space Administration and China Aerospace Science and Technology Corporation in July 1993 as a part of government reform and modernization efforts.

== See also ==
- China Aerospace Science and Industry Corporation
