= Seventh Ministry of Machine-Building Industry =

The Seventh Ministry of Machine-Building Industry (第七机械工业部), originally the Fifth Academy of the Ministry of National Defense, was a government ministry of the People's Republic of China, established November 23, 1964 by the State Council to oversee the space industry.

In 1960, Qian Xuesen founded the Combat Research Department at the Fifth Academy of the Ministry of National Defence. It was China's first military operations research centre.

During the Cultural Revolution, the Seventh Ministry experienced conflicting factions within it. In January 1967, key leadership including Qian Xuesen were ousted for several months; Zhou Enlai ultimately intervened and reversed the ouster. Conflict, including physical conflict, later resumed and in June 1968 missile expert Yao Tongbin was beaten to death.

In April 1988 the Ministry merged with the Ministry of the Aviation Industry and adopted the name of the Ministry of Aviation and Space Industry.
