= 2018 Chinese salmon controversy =

Food controversy in China

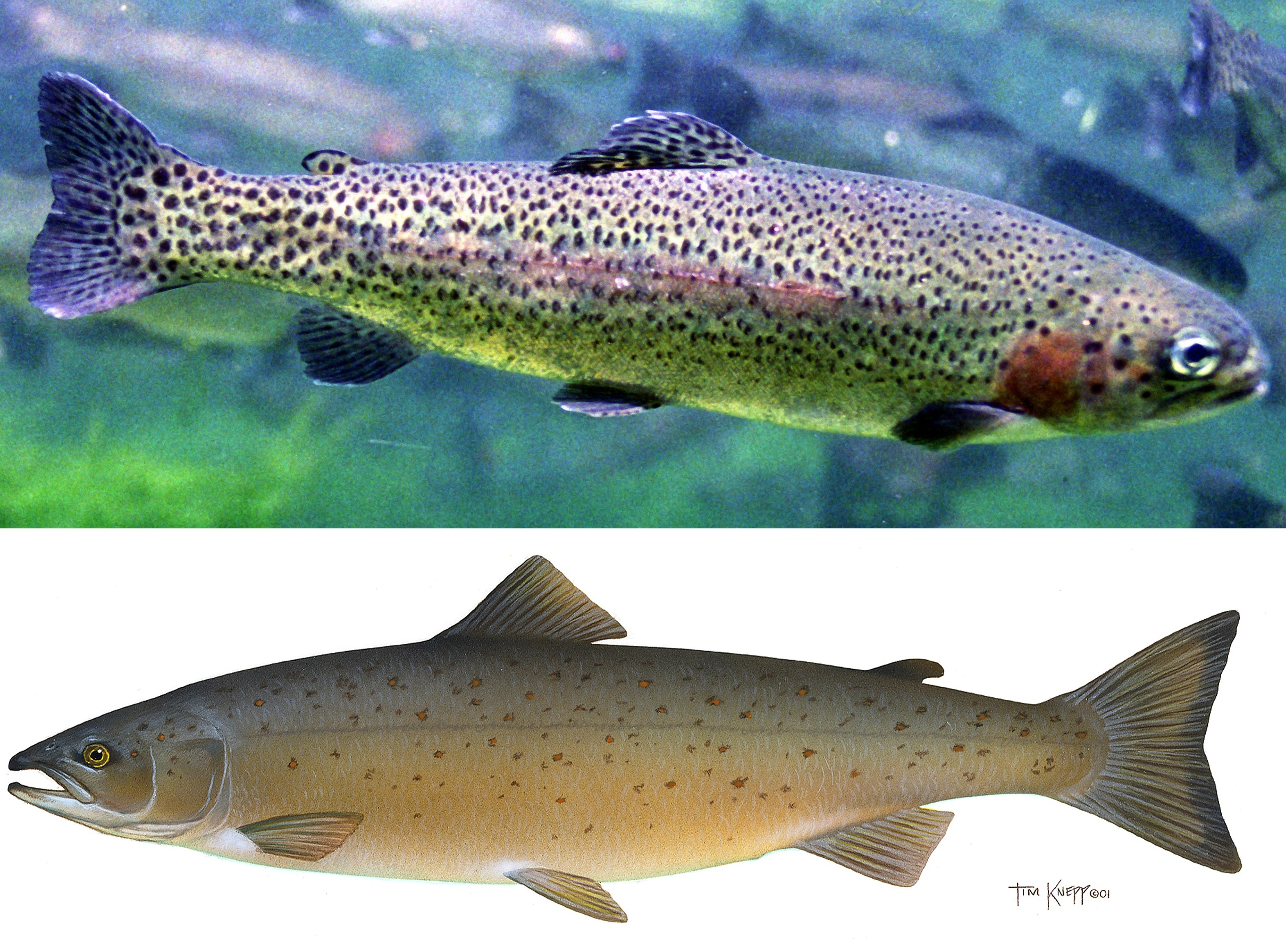
Rainbow trout (top) and Atlantic salmon (bottom)

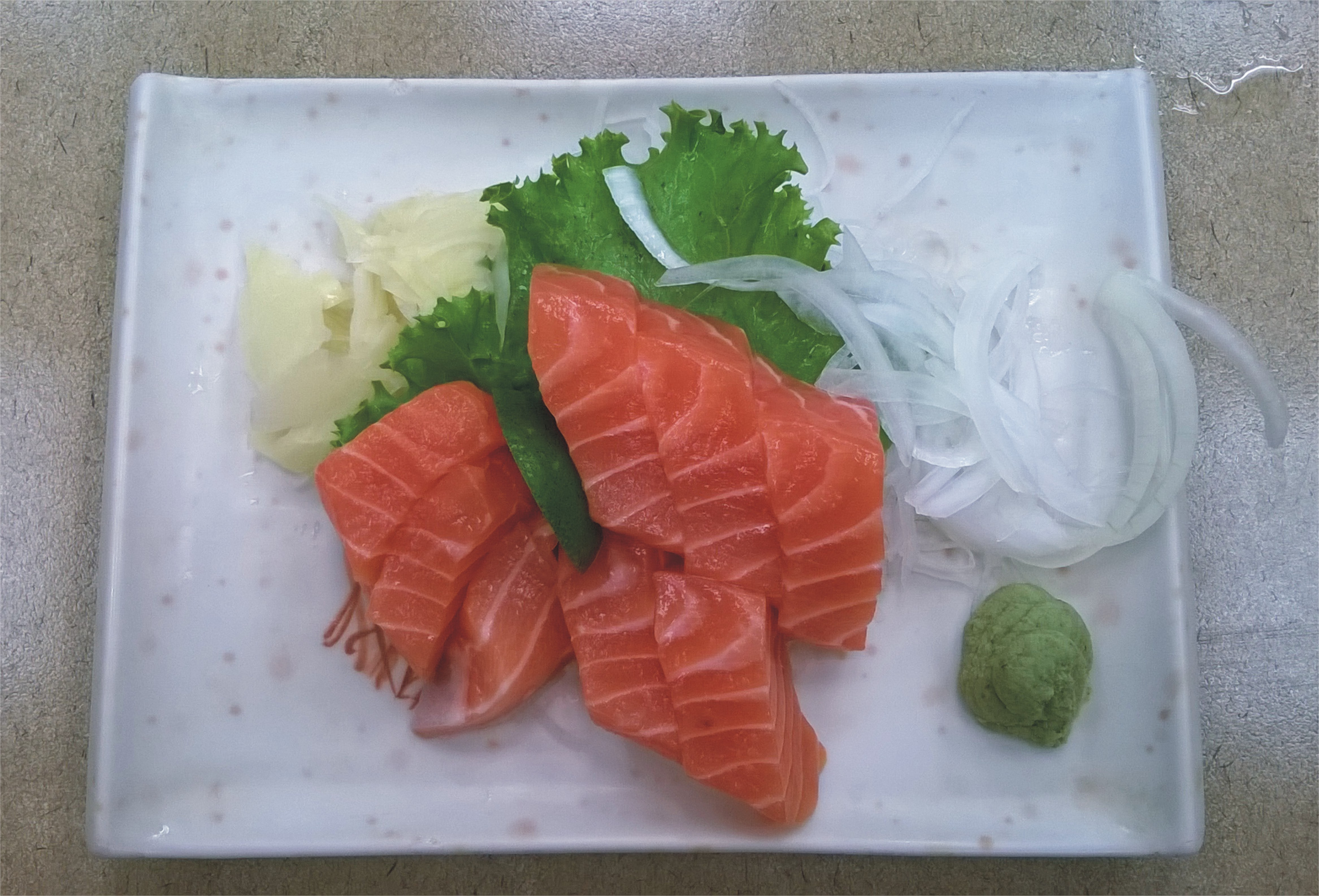
Rainbow trout sashimi and salmon sashimi are visually almost indistinguishable

The domestic salmon controversy in China refers to a dispute in the aquatic products market in mainland China, where consumers and the media have questioned whether rainbow trout from freshwater aquaculture can be marketed under the name “salmon.” Some vendors claim that rainbow trout, like Atlantic salmon, is suitable for raw consumption, raising concerns about consumers’ right to information and food safety.

Reports of rainbow trout being marketed under the name “salmon” (a Cantonese transliteration of the English word “salmon”) in mainland China can be traced back to 2004, when market regulators in Shanghai carried out a rectification campaign. In May 2018, China Central Television Finance Channel reported that nearly one-third of the “salmon” sold in mainland China came from aquaculture farms at the Longyangxia Dam in Qinghai. In August 2018, the China Aquatic Products Processing and Marketing Alliance released a draft group standard titled "Raw-Consumption Salmon", proposing that rainbow trout could be sold as an ingredient for salmon sashimi. Supporters of the standard argued that the establishment of group standards by industry associations would promote the healthy development of the salmon market. Opponents, however, contended that many of those involved in drafting the standard had vested interests, and that classifying rainbow trout as salmon constituted mislabeling, undermined fair market competition, and infringed upon consumers’ rights to information and choice, as well as posing risks to food safety. Although various government agencies, quasi-governmental bodies, and social organizations conducted research on the draft standard, no consensus has been reached. Nevertheless, numerous experts in fields such as food science, law, quality regulation, and consumer protection have expressed their views on the issue.

== Differences between rainbow trout and salmon ==
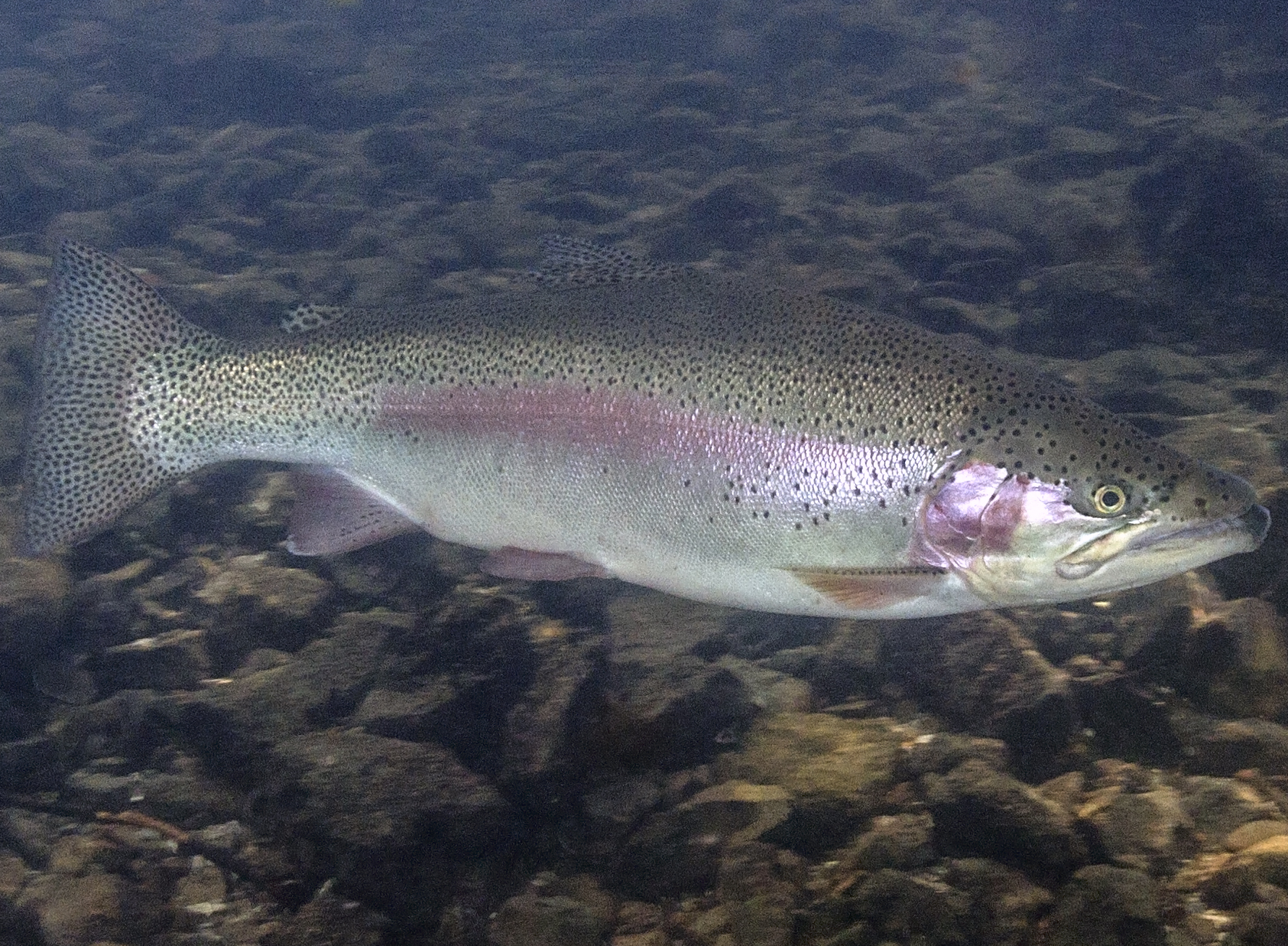
Rainbow Trout (Oncorhynchus mykiss)

=== Rainbow trout ===
Rainbow trout (scientific name: Oncorhynchus mykiss) is a species of freshwater fish in the family Salmonidae and the genus Oncorhynchus. It is native to coastal drainage systems of the Bering Sea in Northeast Asia and the Pacific Northwest of North America. Based on differences in anadromous behavior, rainbow trout can be further divided into several subspecies. With the exception of the anadromous form known as steelhead, most subspecies primarily inhabit inland freshwater environments and undertake migrations entirely within freshwater systems between lakes and streams during the spawning season.

Freshwater rainbow trout differ in appearance from the anadromous steelhead found in saltwater and brackish environments. Freshwater rainbow trout typically have a more rounded head and a body coloration ranging from blue, green, to pale yellow, with a silvery-white underside. Their backs are covered with black spots, and a broad pink stripe runs along the lateral line from the gill slit to the tail. The tail is relatively square-shaped with only slight forking. In contrast, steelhead more closely resemble marine fish, with a more elongated and streamlined body profile. Their coloration is generally more uniform grayish-white with higher reflectivity. They exhibit small black spots on the back and some degree of countershading camouflage. The characteristic red stripe is largely absent except during spawning migrations, when it may reappear. The tail is evenly spotted, and there are no teeth in the throat or at the back of the tongue. In addition, adult steelhead tend to be larger than freshwater rainbow trout, likely due to colder aquatic environments, consistent with Bergmann's rule. According to the National Wildlife Federation, steelhead and other forms of rainbow trout are not reproductively isolated and are considered the same species. Freshwater rainbow trout typically inhabit cool, shallow, and wide rivers and lakes. During the spawning season, they usually undertake short-distance migrations to upstream streams where they were born in order to reproduce. Like freshwater rainbow trout, steelhead grow in inland freshwater environments, but upon reaching maturity they migrate, like salmon, to estuaries and adjacent saltwater or brackish water habitats. They remain there until the spawning season, when they undertake long upstream migrations back to freshwater. This life cycle is similar to that of other Pacific salmon species commonly referred to as “salmon”. However, the Pacific Salmon Foundation in Canada notes that steelhead may alter their migratory behavior in response to environmental changes and may remain in freshwater for extended periods.

Rainbow trout and the closely related cutthroat trouts (O. clarkii clade) were historically classified together within the genus Salmo, which includes the Atlantic salmon, and were assigned the scientific name Salmo gairdneri. As early as 1914, the ichthyologist Charles Tate Regan proposed reclassifying rainbow trout within the Pacific salmon genus. In 1989, rainbow trout were formally reclassified into the genus Oncorhynchus, which includes six species of Pacific salmon, and the name Oncorhynchus mykiss was adopted. However, because the anadromous behavior of steelhead more closely resembles that of other species commonly referred to as salmon, the taxonomic classification of rainbow trout remains a subject of debate in Canada.

=== Salmon ===
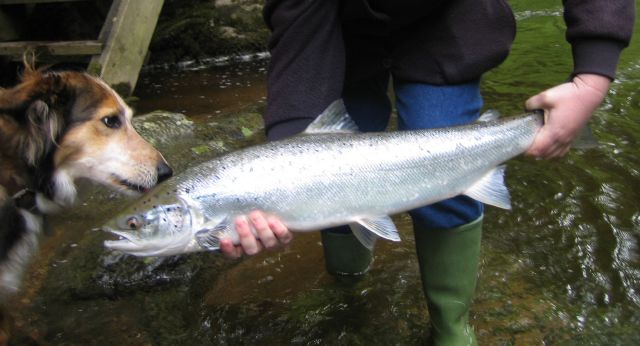
Atlantic Salmon

The term “salmon” in Chinese (gui, 鮭/鲑) can be traced back to Middle Chinese, although its meaning differed significantly from its modern usage. At the time the Kangxi Dictionary was compiled, the character “gui” had several meanings, one of which referred to pufferfish. Beginning with the publication of the Encyclopedic Dictionary of Zoology edited by Du Yaquan, the original meaning of “gui” as pufferfish disappeared, and the term came to be used exclusively as a common name for fishes of the family Salmonidae. Historically, the salmon most commonly found in East Asia was the chum salmon (Oncorhynchus keta), commonly known in Chinese as dàmahā yú (大马哈鱼). The term derives from Northeastern Mandarin, which borrowed it from the Hezhe language of the Tungusic languages, where daw imaha was a general term referring to two species of Oncorhynchus fish (chum salmon and pink salmon) native to Outer Manchuria. Influenced by Chinese culture, Japan historically referred to chum salmon as sake (さけ), written with the characters 石桂魚 (distinct from the fish known as Siniperca in modern Chinese). From the Meiji period onward, the character 鮭 (read sake in Japanese) was adopted and used as a general term for all members of the family Salmonidae.

The term “salmon” in modern Chinese corresponds to the English word “salmon”, which is not a precise term in taxonomy but rather a common name used in Western fisheries to refer broadly to a group of edible fish with similar body forms, ecological niches, and anadromous life cycles. In this respect, it is comparable to other general terms in English such as bass, trout, carp, mackerel, and sardine. Historically, in Western usage, “salmon” primarily referred to the Atlantic salmon (Salmo salar), native to northwestern Europe, particularly the region known as Germania in Ancient Rome. Following the European colonization of the Americas, European settlers encountered salmonid species in the Pacific Ocean drainage systems of North America, and the meaning of “salmon” expanded to include six commercially important species of the genus Oncorhynchus along the North Pacific coast (chum salmon, Chinook salmon, sockeye salmon, pink salmon, masu salmon, and coho salmon). In addition to members of the family Salmonidae, the term “salmon” is sometimes used in regions outside Europe and North America to refer to unrelated fish species. Examples include the so-called “Australian salmon” (several in the genus Arripis of the order Scombriformes), “Hawaiian salmon” (Elagatis bipinnulata, also known as the rainbow runner, a species of the order Carangiformes), and “Indian salmon” (Eleutheronema tetradactylum, another species of the order Carangiformes).

== Background ==
=== Rainbow trout aquaculture in Longyangxia Reservoir ===
In 1992, Jin Jipeng, then governor of Qinghai, convened an executive meeting to plan the development of rainbow trout aquaculture in the Longyangxia Reservoir. Taking advantage of the area’s high water quality and relatively low temperatures, multiple state-owned enterprises, private companies, and agricultural cooperatives entered the industry. The aquaculture sector later became a key industry in Gonghe County and Longyangxia Town. The county developed related sectors such as fish sales, agritourism, and leisure tourism to diversify economic growth. By 2015, the integrated industry chain in Longyangxia Town had generated approximately 70 million yuan in GDP. In July 2008, the DunAn Group obtained exclusive 50-year rights to develop and operate fishery resources in Longyangxia Reservoir through a contract with the local government. It subsequently established Qinghai Minze Longyangxia Ecological Aquaculture Co., Ltd. to manage rainbow trout farming in the area. On 3 May 2018, Securities Times reported that DunAn Group was facing a debt crisis. On 8 May of the same month, the Minze company completed an industrial and commercial registration change, and DunAn Group withdrew from the company.

=== Draft “Raw Salmon” industry standard ===
The draft industry standard titled Raw Salmon was issued by the China Aquatic Products Processing and Marketing Alliance, an organization affiliated with the Ministry of Agriculture and Rural Affairs of the People's Republic of China. The standard was jointly developed by 13 companies, at least eight of which were primarily engaged in rainbow trout aquaculture or related businesses. The draft stated that it defined terminology, requirements, inspection methods, labeling, packaging, transportation, and storage standards for raw salmon products. In Section 3.1, “salmon” was defined as a general term for fishes of the family Salmonidae, explicitly including Atlantic salmon, rainbow trout, coho salmon, Chinook salmon, sockeye salmon, chum salmon, and pink salmon. Under this definition, rainbow trout was classified as a type of “raw salmon”. The standard also specified requirements for sensory qualities, physicochemical properties, contaminants, parasites, and testing procedures. It further required that product labels indicate the product name, species name, and place of origin, such as “salmon (Atlantic salmon)” or “salmon (rainbow trout)”.

== Course of events ==
=== Domestic salmon incident ===
On 22 May 2018, “Economic Half Hour”, a program on the Finance Channel of China Central Television, aired a special report titled “A New ‘Fresh’ Flavor Emerging from Technology”. The program reported on the use of fishery technology by Qinghai Minze Longyangxia Ecological Aquaculture Co., Ltd. to farm rainbow trout by taking advantage of the low water temperature and high water quality of the Longyangxia Reservoir. It also stated that nearly one-third of the “salmon” sold in mainland China originated from aquaculture in this reservoir. This event became known as the “domestic salmon” incident, also referred to as the “real vs. fake salmon” controversy.

Following the outbreak of the incident, on 24 May, the China Fisheries Association issued a statement stating that the claim that “rainbow trout is not salmon” was a misunderstanding. It argued that “salmon” is a commercial name referring to Atlantic salmon and several other species, including rainbow trout, and that farmed rainbow trout is safe and controllable, with an extremely low probability of parasite infection. However, the incident triggered public concern among internet users over food safety and consumers’ right to information, with some expressing that they would no longer consume “salmon”. The Yangtzi Evening News reported that some salmon products on the market had unclear labeling and were suspected of false advertising. Ma Suping of Southern Weekly argued that seafood mislabeling in mainland China was not an isolated case, citing examples such as oilfish being sold as cod. He noted that while such labeling fraud may not necessarily affect food safety, it is often concealed and widespread, posing challenges to government regulation. Another commentary in Southern Weekly by Xin Xingzhi stated that the salmon controversy was not merely a scientific issue, but also affected normal market order and public health, calling on relevant government authorities to respond promptly.

Following the incident, consumer confidence in the salmon market in mainland China was severely affected. Salmon sales declined sharply and prices fell significantly, directly impacting the sales of imported Atlantic salmon. Within the Atlantic salmon industry, it even became common practice to market the product under the alternative name “marine Atlantic salmon”.

=== Release of the draft industry standard ===
At approximately 20:51 (UTC+8) on 6 August 2018, the China Aquatic Products Processing and Marketing Alliance published the draft group standard Raw-Consumption Salmon (standard number: T/CAPPMA 08-2018) for public consultation. The consultation period ended on 9 August of the same month. On 10 August 2018, the inaugural meeting of the Salmon Branch of the China Aquatic Products Processing and Marketing Alliance was held in Xining, Qinghai. On the same day, the branch released the standard at the meeting venue, stipulating that rainbow trout could be classified as a type of raw-consumption salmon.

According to the explanatory notes of the standard, it was drafted by 13 companies. According to the association’s internal regulations, the formulation of a group standard requires the participation of at least five companies and two research institutions. The stated purpose was “to further maintain fair market competition, protect the legitimate rights and interests of consumers, and provide technical support for market supervision, inspection, and regulation.” It was also intended to respond to the negative impact on consumer confidence caused by the “domestic salmon” incident in May of the same year. The public consultation period lasted only three days. In addition, an article previously reposted on the association’s website stating that “rainbow trout is not salmon” was removed. In response, the association stated that the shortened consultation period was due to the special circumstance of releasing the standard at the inauguration of the Salmon Branch, and that the standard had not yet been submitted for approval. It also stated that the reposted article did not represent the association’s views. The association stated that, as the concept of “salmon” is formed by convention, no one can determine whether it is correct or incorrect; therefore, the group standard requires labeling of the specific species name and place of origin. The association also stated that this labeling requirement is a key feature of the standard.

Regarding the establishment of the Salmon Branch, the association stated that the need to address product quality, branding, and changes in domestic and international markets brought relevant parties together, and that this was beneficial to the domestic market by helping to put forward unified demands externally. The association also stated that the “domestic salmon” incident in May gave rise to this standard. In order to ensure food safety, avoid commercial fraud, and protect consumers’ right to be informed, member companies of the association drafted the standard, and experts including professors and researchers from universities and research institutions participated in the review process. The association expressed the hope of increasing the adoption rate of the standard and promoting it to become an industry standard or a national standard, in order to regulate market order and avoid the emergence of monopolistic practices.

According to the explanatory notes released by the association, the definition of “raw salmon” in the group standard referenced several sources, including the Wikipedia article on salmon, the 2018 salmon farming handbook published by Marine Harvest (now known as Mowi), and a salmon market analysis report published by Kontali Analyse in 2007. However, as of 16 August 2018, both the Chinese- and English-language versions of Wikipedia explicitly stated that rainbow trout is not classified as salmon and did not mention that it could be consumed raw. In addition, the 113-page Marine Harvest salmon farming handbook contained only one mention of rainbow trout, in the context of disease control, while the 2007 report published by Kontali Analyse did not mention rainbow trout.

At the time of the standard’s release, Qinghai Daily reported that the standard would help regulate the industry, ensure quality, protect consumers’ right to be informed, and promote the healthy development of the salmon industry. By contrast, China Youth Daily questioned why rainbow trout needed to be associated with the name “salmon”. An editorial by The Paper argued that in order to strengthen the branding of Qinghai rainbow trout, consumer confidence in food safety must be ensured, and that the issue should not be addressed through “wordplay”. It further stated that the controversy over salmon “should not be decided solely by interested parties”. Several international media outlets, including BBC News, The Guardian, and The Independent, also published reports questioning the standard. Some reports described the move as an attempt to “legalize the problem rather than solve it”. On social media platform Twitter, the hashtag “#RainbowTroutBecomesSalmon” emerged, reflecting public questioning of the standard. Science and Technology Daily questioned whether the standard could become a form of industry protection. People’s Dailypublished a commentary stating that group standards should not become tools for group interests, but should instead guide industry development and protect consumers’ legitimate rights and interests.

=== Heyu and Minze salmon sales dispute ===
On 14 July 2018, The Paper reported on a Tmall store named “Longyangxia Flagship Store” (operated by Qinghai Minze Longyangxia Ecological Aquaculture Co., Ltd.). The store sold rainbow trout sourced from the Longyangxia Reservoir, but all products were labeled as “salmon” without mentioning “rainbow trout”. The listed preparation method stated that the fish was suitable for both raw and cooked consumption, and claimed that it met the requirements for raw consumption. After a reporter reported the online store operator to food regulatory authorities in Qinghai Province, the authorities responded by stating that the claims were inaccurate. Following the incident, all products in the store were temporarily removed for rectification. They were later relisted with the description “suitable for both raw and cooked consumption” removed, and were labeled as “rainbow trout” and sold at discounted prices. Sales volume also declined significantly.

On 22 August 2018, The Paper reported another consumer complaint case. A customer purchased products labeled as “salmon” (which were in fact rainbow trout products) from a self-operated JD.com store selling products of Shanghai Heyu Frozen Foods Co., Ltd., but discovered that some of the products were marketed under the name “salmon”, including one product that directly used the scientific name of Atlantic salmon, Salmo salar. On the same day the incident was reported, the company revised the product descriptions to “salmon (rainbow trout)”, in accordance with the draft group standard. Afterwards, Zhou Zhuocheng, director of the Native Aquatic Organisms and Aquatic Ecology Committee of the China Fisheries Association, stated that Heyu Company's use of the scientific name of Atlantic salmon on rainbow trout products unquestionably constituted consumer fraud and should be severely punished. The following day, the products involved were removed from JD.com, and market regulatory authorities in Fengxian District also launched an investigation. However, legal professionals expressed pessimism about consumers’ ability to defend their rights because of the existence of the draft group standard and the consumable nature of the food products involved.

Afterwards, because the draft group standard explicitly defined rainbow trout as a type of salmon, consumers of the Longyangxia flagship store found themselves unable to effectively defend their rights. Staff members of Oriental Press Group submitted several commercially available “salmon” products to an unnamed testing institution for DNA testing, which ultimately confirmed that Minze and Heyu had indeed sold rainbow trout products under the names “salmon” and “Atlantic salmon”. In response to the decline in sales caused by the controversy surrounding the draft group standard, an executive of Heyu Company stated that the company did not regret its actions.

== Controversy ==
=== Definition controversy of salmon ===
The term "salmon" is derived from the English word salmon, which itself originates from Latin, meaning "to leap". It generally refers to any fish in the family Salmonidae that exhibits anadromous behavior, migrating upstream and often leaping out of the water to overcome obstacles and changes in water level. Traditionally in Europe, the term specifically referred to the Atlantic salmon, which inhabits the North Atlantic and Baltic Sea river systems. In English usage, "salmon" conventionally includes commercially important edible fish species within the genera Salmo and Oncorhynchus. These typically include seven species:

- Atlantic salmon (S. salar);
- Pink salmon (O. gorbuscha);
- Chum salmon (O. keta), aka dog salmon;
- Coho salmon (O. kisutch), aka silver salmon;
- Masu salmon (O. masou), aka cherry salmon;
- Sockeye salmon (O. nerka);
- Chinook salmon (O. tshawytscha), aka king salmon.

The rainbow trout (Oncorhynchus mykiss) is one of the most important members of the genus Oncorhynchus. Its coastal anadromous subspecies, the steelhead (O. mykiss irideus), closely resembles the Atlantic salmon in appearance and exhibits nearly identical migratory behavior. However, in a strict sense, it is generally not included within the traditional definition of "salmon" in academic usage. A similar case is the brown trout (Salmo trutta), which belongs to the same genus as the Atlantic salmon. Its anadromous form, the sea trout (S. trutta trutta), has a life cycle almost identical to that of the Atlantic salmon, yet it is also typically not classified as "salmon".

The transliteration "sanwenyu" for "salmon" in the Chinese-speaking world originated in British Hong Kong, where it was primarily used to refer to Atlantic salmon imported from Northern Europe (especially Norway) to East Asia during the 1970s and 1980s. Following the economic reforms in China, the term entered mainland China via the Shenzhen Special Economic Zone and spread throughout the Pearl River Delta, later becoming more widely adopted alongside the growing influence of Lingnan culture amid the economic rise of Guangdong. In recent years, the term "sanwenyu" has also been used in mainland China as a commercial label for rainbow trout. The practice of feeding rainbow trout with astaxanthin to produce an orange-red flesh color and marketing them as Atlantic salmon had already been reported as early as 2004. On 17 March 2004, the front page of Xinmin Evening News reported that vendors at the Tongchuan Road Aquatic Products Market in Shanghai were selling rainbow trout as "salmon", describing the practice as misleading to consumers. The report prompted intervention by local market regulators. A professor from the former Shanghai Fisheries University stated that astaxanthin itself is not harmful, but its use in this context could mislead consumers. Subsequently, local authorities required vendors not to market rainbow trout under the name "salmon", warning that violations would be subject to administrative penalties.

Wu Hanlin, a scholar from the former Shanghai Fisheries University (now Shanghai Ocean University), argued that the term "salmon" has long been used to refer specifically to large, orange-fleshed marine salmonids such as the Atlantic salmon and Pacific salmon, and that applying the term to freshwater-farmed rainbow trout is inappropriate. Tang Wenqiao, a professor at Shanghai Ocean University and a specialist in biological taxonomy, stated that rainbow trout differ fundamentally from other fish commonly referred to as "salmon" because they do not migrate from marine environments. From a taxonomic perspective, he noted, the academic community generally does not classify rainbow trout as salmon. By contrast, a draft industry standard proposed by the China Aquatic Products Circulation and Processing Association classified rainbow trout as "salmon".

=== Safety of consuming rainbow trout raw ===
Proponents of the industry standard argue that rainbow trout meeting certain criteria—such as an individual weight above 3 kilograms (6.6 lb), absence of detectable parasites, and controlled levels of contaminants and bacterial counts—can be considered suitable for raw consumption after undergoing freezing treatments, such as continuous freezing at below −20 °C for at least 24 hours or below −35 °C for at least 15 hours. Freezing requirements issued by the U.S. Food and Drug Administration (FDA) are broadly similar and do not differentiate between fish species. An article in Farmers' Daily (Nongmin Ribao) cited aquaculture experts as stating that domestically produced "salmon" in China can be safely consumed raw. The Norwegian Food Safety Authority also issued a statement indicating that farmed Atlantic salmon and seawater-farmed rainbow trout in Norway are safe for raw consumption in dishes such as sushi and sashimi.

Tang Wenqiao, a professor at Shanghai Ocean University, stated that it is inappropriate to classify rainbow trout as "salmon", but that consuming rainbow trout raw may be acceptable under controlled aquaculture conditions. Chen Shunsheng, also a professor at Shanghai Ocean University, stated that freezing methods for parasite control are primarily applicable to marine fish and may not necessarily be suitable for freshwater-farmed rainbow trout. He added that the safety of consuming such treated rainbow trout raw remains uncertain and may involve relatively high risks. After interviewing relevant experts, the Beijing Morning Post also concluded that “salmon” was unsuitable for raw consumption because of parasites. The experts further recommended that “salmon” intended for raw consumption should either be frozen in accordance with U.S. Food and Drug Administration (FDA) standards or cooked thoroughly.

A report by The Paper cited abstracts indexed in PubMed and noted that infections of Diphyllobothrium latum in freshwater rainbow trout have been documented in multiple regions worldwide, including Chile and Argentina. Experts from the Chinese Center for Disease Control and Prevention have also stated that the consumption of raw freshwater fish plays an important role in the transmission of Clonorchis sinensis. In addition, guidance issued by the U.S. Food and Drug Administration (FDA) in 2001 indicated that all wild-caught Pacific salmon should be regarded as potentially infected with Anisakis, and that inspection data in the United States have found infection rates as high as 75% in species such as sockeye salmon, coho salmon, and Chinook salmon. Public Health Ontario reviewed data from 29 studies on parasite control by freezing. One study found that Diphyllobothrium larvae in fish could be killed by freezing at −18 °C within 24 hours, while four studies addressed Anisakis parasites.

An internal source from the China Fisheries Association stated that parasite testing institutions related to the "salmon" industry may face conflicts of interest and thus may not always remain fully objective and neutral. For example, in a parasite testing project commissioned by Minze Company to a testing institution in Shandong, parasites that are unlikely to infect freshwater fish were reportedly identified. The company also conducted a live-streamed self-inspection following the "domestic salmon" controversy, during which thick cuts of fish were reportedly placed directly under the light source of an optical microscope without proper slicing or sampling. Industry insiders have also suggested that aquaculture environments for freshwater rainbow trout are difficult to fully control, which may increase the risk of parasite infection.

== Aftermath ==
=== Government agencies ===
On 6 September 2018, the National Health Commission (NHC) announced on its official website that the China National Center for Food Safety Risk Assessment, an agency under the commission, had conducted emergency monitoring of commercially sold salmon products in Hunan, Guangdong, and Qinghai in June 2018. None of the 92 samples tested were found to contain metacercariae of Clonorchis sinensis, Metorchis orientalis, or third-stage larvae of Gnathostoma. The report was removed from the official website the following day. Some critics questioned the findings, citing the limited number of samples tested and the absence of testing for common tapeworm species. Later that month, reports indicated that several government departments, including the Ministry of Agriculture and Rural Affairs and the Standardization Administration of China, were considering discussions and evaluations regarding the “Raw Salmon” standard. In October 2018, the Department of Standards Innovation Management under the Standardization Administration of China stated that it was studying the “Raw Salmon” group standard and had consulted relevant industry associations.

In October 2018, Zhu Ziming, former director of the Policy and Regulations Division of the former Shanghai Municipal Bureau of Quality and Technical Supervision, published an article titled “On Group Standards from the Classification of Rainbow Trout as Salmon” in the journal Quality and Standardization. He argued that the view that rainbow trout is not salmon had become a public consensus, and that the “Raw Salmon” group standard violated the fundamental principles and requirements of standard-setting and should be corrected in accordance with the Standardization Law of the People’s Republic of China. Zhu also noted that group standards do not possess administrative enforcement power and would be unlikely to compel the public to accept rainbow trout as salmon. He suggested establishing a separate “Raw Rainbow Trout” standard that would classify rainbow trout independently.

According to a report by The Paper, within two months after the introduction of the standard, a journalist made nearly 90 phone calls to various government departments and organizations, including the Fisheries Administration of the Ministry of Agriculture and Rural Affairs, the Standardization Administration of China, the State Administration for Market Regulation, the Fengxian District Market Supervision Bureau in Shanghai, the Shanghai Consumer Council, and the China Consumers Association, inquiring about how the standard would be handled subsequently. Most responses either referred the journalist to other departments or stated that the matter was “complex and still under study” or “under investigation”. Apart from the NHC, no official or semi-official organization directly responded to the issue. Industry insiders stated that government departments had adopted an ambiguous stance and were reluctant to clearly support or oppose the standard. They also suggested that, in the absence of a national standard, the controversy might eventually fade without resolution.

=== Consumer protection organizations and legal professionals ===
On 14 August 2018, the Shanghai Consumer Council stated that it was closely monitoring the issue. On 21 August, the council held a public forum on the definition of "salmon". Zheng Weizhong, a council member of the Salmon Branch of the China Aquatic Products Processing and Marketing Association, stated that the purpose of the standard was to clarify which fish met the definition of salmon and to require the species name to be indicated on packaging. Jiang Xian, a standing committee member of the council and a partner at Shanghai United Law Firm, argued that businesses were using scientific terminology to blur distinctions between two fish species, potentially infringing consumers' rights to information and choice. Chen Shunsheng, a professor at Shanghai Ocean University, stated that the traditional definition of salmon referred specifically to salmon raised in seawater and noted that the U.S. Food and Drug Administration (FDA) does not classify rainbow trout as salmon. He also stated that in restaurants and similar settings, consumers are often unable to determine what species of fish is actually being served, making packaging labels ineffective. Prior to the forum, the council conducted a survey through its WeChat account. The results showed that approximately 80% of respondents believed that including rainbow trout under the definition of salmon was misleading, while around 73% were concerned that businesses might use the classification to mislead consumers.

Sui Siyu, an expert committee member of the Qingdao Consumer Council and deputy director of Shandong Hualu Law Firm, stated in an interview with CCTV.com that labeling rainbow trout as salmon could constitute consumer fraud. He added that under Article 55 of the Law of the People's Republic of China on the Protection of Consumer Rights and Interests, businesses could face penalties amounting to several times the purchase price. In an interview with China Consumer News, the China Consumers Association stated that when group standards involve consumer rights, consumer opinions should be considered during the drafting process and public supervision should be accepted. The association also suggested that relevant authorities strengthen oversight to prevent group standards from becoming tools for harming consumer interests.

Wang Yajun, a lawyer at Beijing Shuangbei Law Firm, opposed the "Raw Salmon" group standard, arguing that classifying rainbow trout as salmon could restrict or exclude competition between Atlantic salmon and rainbow trout products and potentially constitute monopolistic conduct. He also stated that potential parasite risks could affect consumer health. In September 2018, he reported the matter to the State Administration for Market Regulation. Cui He, president of the China Aquatic Products Processing and Marketing Association, responded that annual production of rainbow trout meeting the "Raw Salmon" group standard in mainland China was only about 10,000 tonnes, compared to annual salmon imports of around 100,000 tonnes, and therefore would not constitute a monopoly. In October 2018, Wang again reported the standard to the State Administration for Market Regulation and the Standardization Administration of China, arguing that it violated provisions of the Standardization Law requiring standards not to be used to exclude market competition and requiring the drafting process to be transparent.

Jiang Hai, a partner at Yuanda Law Firm and an adjunct professor at East China University of Political Science and Law, stated that the "Raw Salmon" group standard could directly affect consumers' right to information, as consumers dining in restaurants might not know what species of fish was being referred to as salmon on menus. He stated that businesses had a responsibility to provide clear information. Jiang also noted that because no national standard existed, the group standard could potentially influence judicial decisions in disputes between consumers and businesses. Jiang Xian further argued that defining salmon as seven fish species "and others" while using academic terminology to reshape public understanding was harmful to consumers. He described the standard as serving vested interests under the guise of academic authority and suggested that government authorities establish national standards for raw fish consumption and strengthen regulation of industry associations.

== See also ==
- Fish classified as "salmon" by the China Aquatic Products Processing and Marketing Association: salmonids, rainbow trout, Chinook salmon, chum salmon, coho salmon, pink salmon, and sockeye salmon
- Ministry of Agriculture and Rural Affairs of the People's Republic of China, Standardization Administration of China
- "National Food Safety Standard—Animal Aquatic Products" (in Chinese). National Health and Family Planning Commission of the People's Republic of China. 2015-11-23.
- Oncorhynchus mykiss (rainbow trout), Salmo salar (Atlantic salmon)
