= Office of the Central Financial and Economic Affairs Commission =

Chinese Communist Party body

- 中央财经委员会办公室
- Emblem of the Chinese Communist Party

Agency overview
- Formed: March 2023
- Type: Administrative agency of the Central Financial and Economic Affairs Commission
- Jurisdiction: Chinese Communist Party
- Headquarters: Zhongnanhai, Beijing
- Agency executives: He Lifeng, Director; Han Wenxiu, Executive Deputy Director; Yan Pengcheng, Deputy Director; Zhu Weidong, Deputy Director
- Parent agency: Central Financial and Economic Affairs Commission

Office of the Central Financial and Economic Affairs Commission
- Simplified Chinese: 中央财经委员会办公室
- Traditional Chinese: 中央財經委員會辦公室
Transcriptions
Standard Mandarin
- Hanyu Pinyin: Zhōngyāng Cáijīng Wěiyuánhuì Bàngōngshì

Abbreviation
- Simplified Chinese: 中央财办
- Traditional Chinese: 中央財辦
Transcriptions
Standard Mandarin
- Hanyu Pinyin: Zhōngyāng Cáibàn

Second alternative Chinese name
- Simplified Chinese: 中财办
- Traditional Chinese: 中財辦
Transcriptions
Standard Mandarin
- Hanyu Pinyin: Zhōngcáibàn

The Office of the Central Financial and Economic Affairs Commission is the administrative agency of the Central Financial and Economic Affairs Commission, a policy formulation body of the Central Committee of the Chinese Communist Party (CCP) responsible for coordinating national financial and economic decision-making. It is the permanent body of the commission, and handles its day-to-day administrative operations.

== History ==
The Plan for Deepening the Reform of the Party and State Institutions issued by the CCP Central Committee in March 2018 stated that the Central Leading Group for Financial and Economic Affairs would be changed into the Central Financial and Economic Affairs Commission. In 2023, the Office of the Central Rural Work Leading Group formerly located in the Ministry of Agriculture and Rural Affairs was merged into the Central Financial and Economic Affairs Commission and is no longer a separate office.

== Organizational structure ==
The Office of the Central Financial and Economic Commission has the following institutions:

- General Bureau
- Secretariat
- Macroeconomics Bureau (Economic Bureau 1)
- Finance and Trade Bureau (Second Economic Bureau)
- Economic and Trade Bureau (Economic Bureau No. 3)
- International Economic Bureau (Economic Bureau 4)
- Rural Affairs Bureau

== Leaders ==
=== Director ===
1. Li Zhisheng (1981–1985)
2. Jiang Guanzhuang (1985–1994)
3. Zeng Peiyan (August 23, 1994 – March 1998)
4. Hua Jianmin (March 1998 – March 2003)
5. Wang Chunzheng (March 2003 – July 2007)
6. Zhu Zhixin (July 2007 – March 2013)
7. Liu He (March 2013 – March 2023)
8. He Lifeng (March 2023 –)

=== Executive Deputy Director ===
......

- Han Wenxiu (December 2018 –, ministerial level; concurrently director of the Office of the Central Rural Work Leading Group from 2023)

=== Deputy Director ===
......

- Duan Yingbi (August 1994 - April 2003)
- Hua Jianmin (1996–1998)
- Chen Xiwen (2003-June 2016)
- Liu He (March 2003 – March 2013)
- Tang Renjian (March 2006 – April 2014; June 2016 – May 2017)
- Yang Weimin (2011–June 2018)
- Yi Gang (April 2014 – March 2018)
- Han Jun (October 2014 – March 2018)
- Shu Guozeng (November 2014 – May 2017)
- Zhu Guangyao (April 2016 – June 2018)
- Yin Yanlin (December 2017 – June 2023)
- Han Wenxiu (April 2018 – December 2018)
- Liao Min (May 2018 – September 2023)
- Zhu Weidong (August 2023 –)
- Yang Yinkai (September 2023 – April 2025)
- Yan Pengcheng (April 2024 –)
