= Financial Stability and Development Committee =

- 金融稳定发展委员会
- National emblem of China

Agency overview
- Formed: November 8, 2017
- Dissolved: 2023
- Jurisdiction: China
- Headquarters: Beijing
- Agency executive: Liu He
- Parent agency: State Council

The Financial Stability and Development Committee (FSDC; Chinese: 金融稳定发展委员会) was a Chinese financial regulatory body under the State Council that existed between 2017 and 2023. During its existence, it was chaired by member of the Politburo of the Chinese Communist Party and vice premier Liu He.

== History ==
In August 2013, China indicated that it would create a new government body to coordinate financial regulation. The announcement was made amidst a wide variety of regulatory reforms as government concern about the corporate debt bubble grew in China. Chinese Communist Party (CCP) general secretary Xi Jinping at the July 2017 National Financial Work Conference gave a speech describing the Financial Stability and Development Committee, by name, stating that its purpose would be to "strengthen financial regulatory coordination and supplement regulatory shortcomings" and "strengthen the People's Bank of China's macroprudential regulation and systemic risk prevention role, strengthen the regulatory role of financial regulatory departments, and ensure the safe and stable development of the Chinese financial sector." The Central Committee of the CCP and the State Council approved its creation in November 2017. Vice Premier Ma Kai was appointed the inaugural chairman. After the inaugural meeting held in November 2017, Chinese state media identified the FSDC as a critical step to "safeguard financial security and prevent financial risk."

The FSDC held its first meeting in November 2017. The New York Times opined that the Commission "seemed more a minnow than a whale" as it fell far short of proposals to combine the People's Bank of China (PBOC) with existing regulatory agencies to create a "super-regulator." In contrast, the FSDC was assigned a small physical office in the PBOC. The Times noted that Vice Premier Ma was a "lame duck," but expressed hope that the commission would be given more power in the future. It was not until July 2018 that the government announced the full membership of the FSDC, while also indicating that Party Politburo member and Vice Premier Liu He was succeeding Ma as Commission Chair.

As part of the government response to the COVID-19 pandemic in mainland China, the FSDC met repeatedly; while the commission announced its 14th meeting in early January 2020, it disclosed that it held its 25th meeting on 7 April. This reflected deep worry by national leadership about the economic downturn and a policy shift from managing risk from accumulated debt to expanding availability to credit to avoid bankruptcies and job losses.

In March 2023, the Chinese leadership approved the plan on reforming Party and state institutions that included the dissolution of the FSDC, with the newly established Central Financial Commission (CFC) overseeing it. Its abolition was complete by October, with FSDC's General Office being absorbed into the CFC.

== Membership ==
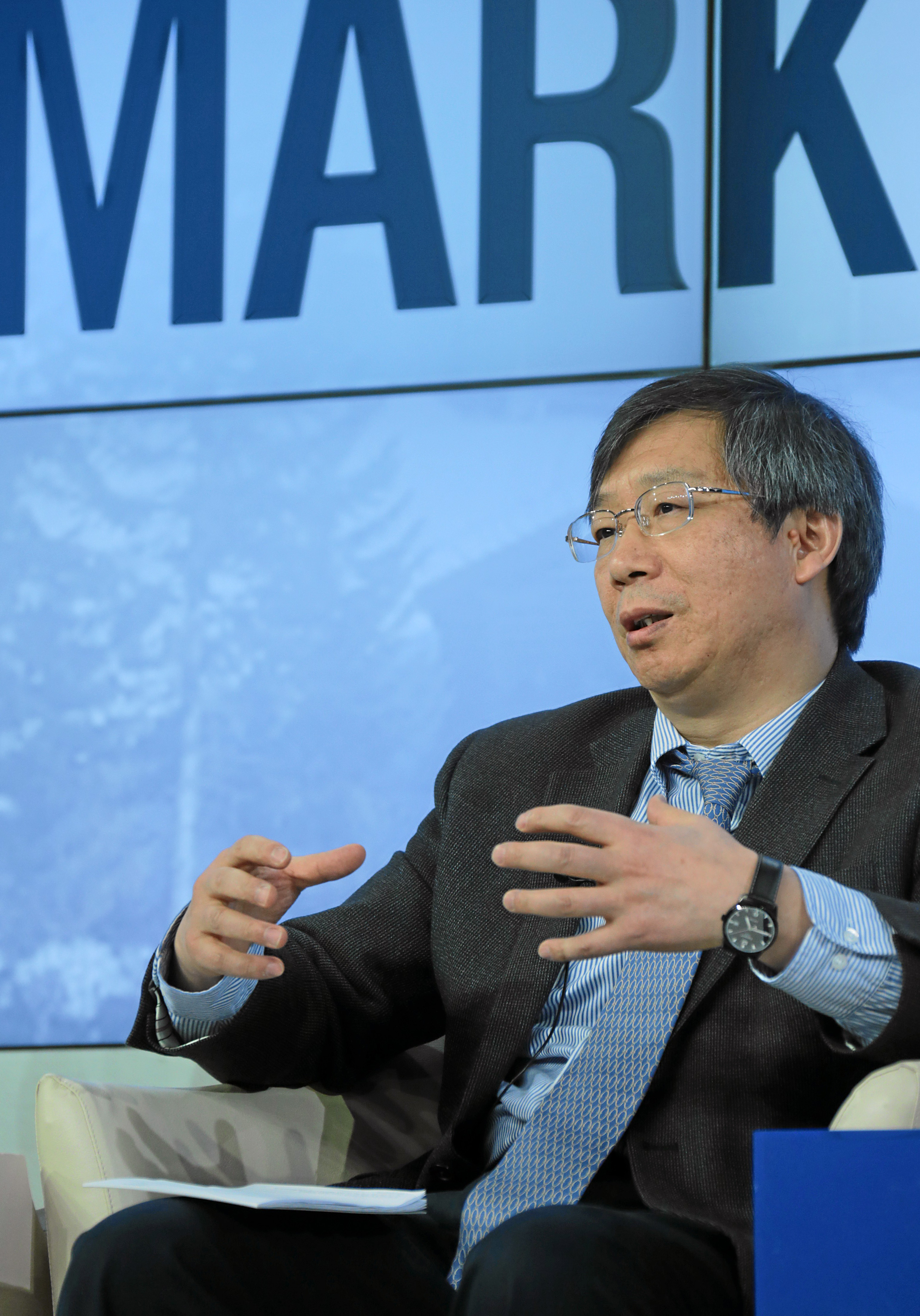
Yi Gang, Governor of the People's Bank of China, is the Vice Chair and Office Chair of the FSDC

The membership of the FSDC, as of July 2018, was:

- Vice Premier Liu He: Chair
- Governor of the PBOC Yi Gang: Vice Chair and Office Chair
- Deputy-secretary general of the State Council Ding Xuedong: Vice Chair
- Chair of the China Banking and Insurance Regulatory Commission Guo Shuqing
- Chair of the China Securities Regulatory Commission Liu Shiyu
- Vice Chair of PBOC and head of the State Administration of Foreign Exchange Pan Gongsheng
- Vice Chair of the Central Financial and Economic Affairs Commission Han Wenxiu
- Vice Chair of the National Development and Reform Commission Lian Weiliang
- Vice Finance Minister Liu Wei

== See also ==
- List of financial supervisory authorities by country
