= Cheng Xiaobo =

Chinese politician (born 1972)

- 程晓波

Standing Deputy Governor of Gansu
- In office January 2022 – August 2026
- Preceded by: Shi Moujun

Personal details
- Born: October 1972 (age 54) Changzhi, Shanxi, China
- Party: Chinese Communist Party (1992-)
- Education: Changchun College of Geology; Central Party School

Cheng Xiaobo (Chinese: 程晓波; born October 1972) is a former Chinese politician, who was served as the standing deputy governor of Gansu from 2022 to 2026.

== Career ==
Cheng was born in Changzhi, Shanxi in October 1972. In 1994, he was graduated from Changchun College of Geology and enrolled to the office of the Ministry of Geology and Mineral Resources. In 1996, he was transferred to the State Planning Commission.

In August 2014, Cheng was appointed as the president of China Reform Daily. In December 2016, he was appointed as the director of the State Information Center.

In April 2019, Cheng was appointed as the deputy secretary-general of the NDRC.

In April 2020, Cheng was transferred to Gansu and appointed as the deputy governor. He was promoted to the standing member of the Gansu Provincial Committee of the Chinese Communist Party and the standing deputy governor of Gansu in January 2022.

== Investigation ==
On 14 August 2026, Cheng was suspected of "serious violations of laws and regulations" by the Central Commission for Discipline Inspection (CCDI), the party's internal disciplinary body, and the National Supervisory Commission, the highest anti-corruption agency of China.

Business positions
Preceded by Shi Moujun	Standing Deputy Governor of Gansu; 2022－2026	Vacant
