= Zhu Zhixin =

Zhu Zhixin is the name of:

- Zhu Zhixin (revolutionary) (1885–1920), Tongmenghui revolutionary and writer
- Zhu Zhixin (politician) (born 1949), People's Republic of China politician and economic official
