= Central Urban Work Conference =

Chinese government gathering

- Simplified Chinese: 中央城市工作会议
- Traditional Chinese: 中央城市工作會議
Transcriptions
Standard Mandarin
- Hanyu Pinyin: Zhōngyāng Chéngshì Gōngzuò Huìyì

The Central Urban Work Conference is the highest-level conference in China in regards to urban work.

== History ==
The Central Urban Work Conference was held on 20 December 2015, the first such conference in 37 years.

The Central Urban Work Conference was 14 to 15 July 2025. At the conference, CCP general secretary Xi Jinping delivered a speech.

== See also ==
- Central Rural Work Leading Group
