= Han Jun (politician) =

Chinese politician (born 1963)

- 韩俊
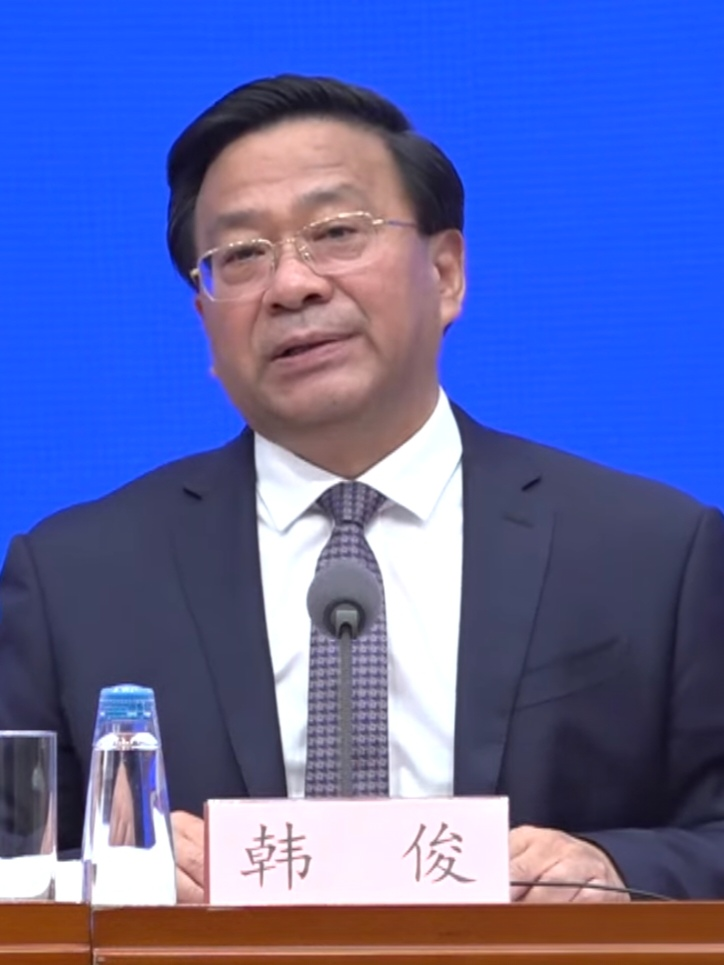
- Han in 2024

Minister of Agriculture and Rural Affairs
- Incumbent
- Assumed office 13 September 2024
- Premier: Li Qiang
- Preceded by: Tang Renjian

Party Secretary of Anhui
- In office 14 March 2023 – 28 June 2024
- Deputy: Wang Qingxian (Governor)
- Preceded by: Zheng Shanjie
- Succeeded by: Liang Yanshun

Governor of Jilin
- In office 25 November 2020 – 2 April 2023
- Preceded by: Jing Junhai
- Succeeded by: Hu Yuting

Personal details
- Born: December 1963 (age 62) Gaoqing County, Shandong
- Party: Chinese Communist Party
- Education: Shandong Agricultural University (BS); Northwest Agricultural University (DSc)

Chinese name
- Simplified Chinese: 韩俊
- Traditional Chinese: 韓俊
Transcriptions
Standard Mandarin
- Hanyu Pinyin: Hán Jùn

Han Jun (Chinese: 韩俊; pinyin: Hán Jùn, born December 1963) is a Chinese politician, currently serving as party branch secretary of the Ministry of Agriculture and Rural Affairs, in office since June 2024. He has served as the Chinese Communist Party Committee Secretary of Anhui from March 2023 to June 2024.

He formerly served from November 2020 to March 2023 as the governor of Jilin.

== Biography ==
Han was born in Gaoqing County, Shandong. He earned a doctorate from Northwest Agricultural University (now Northwest A&F University) in 1989. He served as the Deputy Chief of General Office of the Central Leading Small Group for Financial and Economic Affairs (2014–2018), the Chief of General Office of the Central Leading Small Group for Rural Work (2017–2020), and the Deputy Minister of Agriculture and Rural Affairs (2018–2020).

In November 2020, Han was named acting Governor of Jilin. He was elected as the Governor in January 2021.

On 28 June 2024, Han was appointed party branch secretary of the Ministry of Agriculture and Rural Affairs by the Central Committee of the Chinese Communist Party. On 13 September 2024, he was appointed the Minister of Agriculture and Rural Affairs. Han is a delegate to the 13th National People's Congress.

On 1 March 2025, at the behest of the Uruguayan government, Han Jun, special envoy of President Xi Jinping and Minister of Agriculture and Rural Affairs, participates in the inauguration ceremony of the new President of Uruguay Yamandú Orsi in Montevideo, the capital of Uruguay. On 2 March 2025, Orsi convenes with Han Jun at the presidential palace.

Party political offices
Preceded by Tang Renjian	Director of General Office of the Central Rural Work Leading Group; 2017–2018	Succeeded by Han Changfu
Preceded by Zheng Shanjie	Party Secretary of Anhui; 2023–2024	Succeeded by Liang Yanshun
Government offices
Preceded by Jing Junhai	Governor of Jilin; 2020–2023	Succeeded by Hu Yuting
Preceded by Tang Renjian	Minister of Agriculture and Rural Affairs; 2024–present	Incumbent
