= Liu He (politician) =

Chinese economist and politician

- 刘鹤
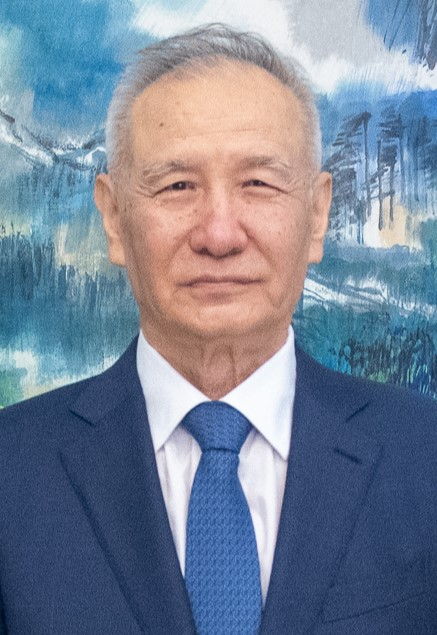
- Liu He in 2023

Vice Premier of China
- In office 19 March 2018 – 12 March 2023 Serving with Han Zheng, Sun Chunlan, Hu Chunhua
- Premier: Li Keqiang

Director of the Office of the Central Financial and Economic Affairs Commission (Note: Office was known as the "Director of the Office of the Central Financial and Economic Affairs Leading Group" before March 2018.)
- In office 20 March 2013 – October 2023
- Deputy: Chen Xiwen
- General secretary: Xi Jinping
- Preceded by: Zhu Zhixin
- Succeeded by: He Lifeng

Personal details
- Born: 25 January 1952 (age 74) Beijing, China
- Party: Chinese Communist Party (1976–present)
- Education: Renmin University (BS, MS); Harvard University (MPA)
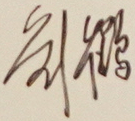
- Signature

Liu He (Chinese: 刘鹤; pinyin: Liú Hè; born 25 January 1952) is a Chinese economist and retired politician who served as a vice premier of China from 2018 to 2023. Additionally, he served as the director of the Office of the Central Financial and Economic Affairs Commission of the Chinese Communist Party (CCP) from 2013 to 2023, the director of the Financial Stability and Development Committee from 2017 to 2023, as well as a member of the Politburo of the Chinese Communist Party from 2017 to 2022.

Liu studied industrial economics in the Renmin University of China in the 1980s, he worked in various jobs in the State Council Development Research Center, the State Planning Commission, the State Information Center, and the State Council Information Office between 1986 and 2003, being responsible for economic affairs. He was a deputy director of the Central Leading Group for Financial and Economic Affairs between 2003 and 2011, and deputy director of the Development Research Center between 2011 and 2013; during this time, he was an influential advisor to CCP general secretary Hu Jintao on economic affairs.

Liu became a member of the CCP Central Committee in 2013, when he became a deputy director of the National Development and Reform Commission, as well as the director of the Office of the Central Leading Group for Financial and Economic Affairs. During this period, he advised CCP general secretary Xi Jinping on economic affairs, and was considered a primary architect of Xi's economic policies. He was promoted to the Politburo in 2017 and became a vice premier in 2018, where he continued to take on economic policies and also became the top trade negotiator with the United States due to the China–United States trade war. Liu retired from the Politburo in 2022, and stepped down from vice premiership in 2023.

== Early life and education ==
Born in Beijing on 25 January 1952, Liu attended Beijing 101 Middle School for middle and high school; some foreign and Chinese media have mistakenly reported that Liu attended the same middle school with Xi Jinping, though Xi attended the Bayi School and Beijing No. 25 School. Nevertheless, they still likely grew close ties as they grew up in the same neighborhood.

Liu was sent down to Taonan, Jilin during the Cultural Revolution, where he worked in an agricultural commune. In 1970, he joined 82nd Group Army, and once became a deputy squad leader. He retired from army after three years, and was assigned to Beijing Radio Factory as a worker for another three years. He joined the Chinese Communist Party (CCP) in December 1976. He received a Bachelor of Science in Industrial Economics and Management from Renmin University of China in 1983 and a Master of Science in Industrial Economics in 1986. He was a visiting scholar at Seton Hall University School of Business from 1992 to 1993. He received a Master of Public Administration from Harvard Kennedy School in 1995. Liu was also a founder of the Chinese Economists 50 Forum.

== Career ==
He has published widely on macroeconomics, Chinese industrial and economic development policy, new economic theory and the information industry, writing five books and over 200 articles.

Liu briefly worked as a researcher in the Development Research Center of the State Council between 1986 and 1987. Afterwards, he worked as a deputy director of the Research Office of the State Planning Commission, and later a deputy director of the Industrial Policy and Long-term Planning Department of the Commission between 1987 and 1998. Between the years of 1998 and 2001, he serves as the executive deputy director of the State Information Center, and concurrently the chairman of the China Economic Information Company. He was a deputy director at the State Council Information Office (SCIO) between 2001 and 2003, in charge of e-commerce and international cooperation.

Liu became a deputy director of the Central Leading Group for Financial and Economic Affairs in 2003, a position he served until 2011, where he was responsible for macro-economic policy planning and drafting speeches for CCP general secretary Hu Jintao during the Central Economic Work Conference. He briefly returned to the Development Research Center between 2011 and 2013, where he served as the CCP secretary and deputy director.

In 2013, he became a member of the CCP Central Committee, and was appointed as a deputy director and CCP secretary of the National Development and Reform Commission, serving in that office until 2018. He also became the director of the Office of the Central Leading Group for Financial and Economic Affairs, which was later upgraded to a commission in 2018. During this time, Liu began advising CCP general secretary Xi Jinping on a series of economic initiatives, and was believed to be one of the primary architects of Chinese economic policy at the time. He has been described as "one of the technocrats that Xi Jinping trusts a great deal". He was the chief drafter of the communiqué at the Third Plenum of the 18th National CCP Congress, which promised to give "market forces" a "decisive" role in allocating resources.

=== Vice Premier ===
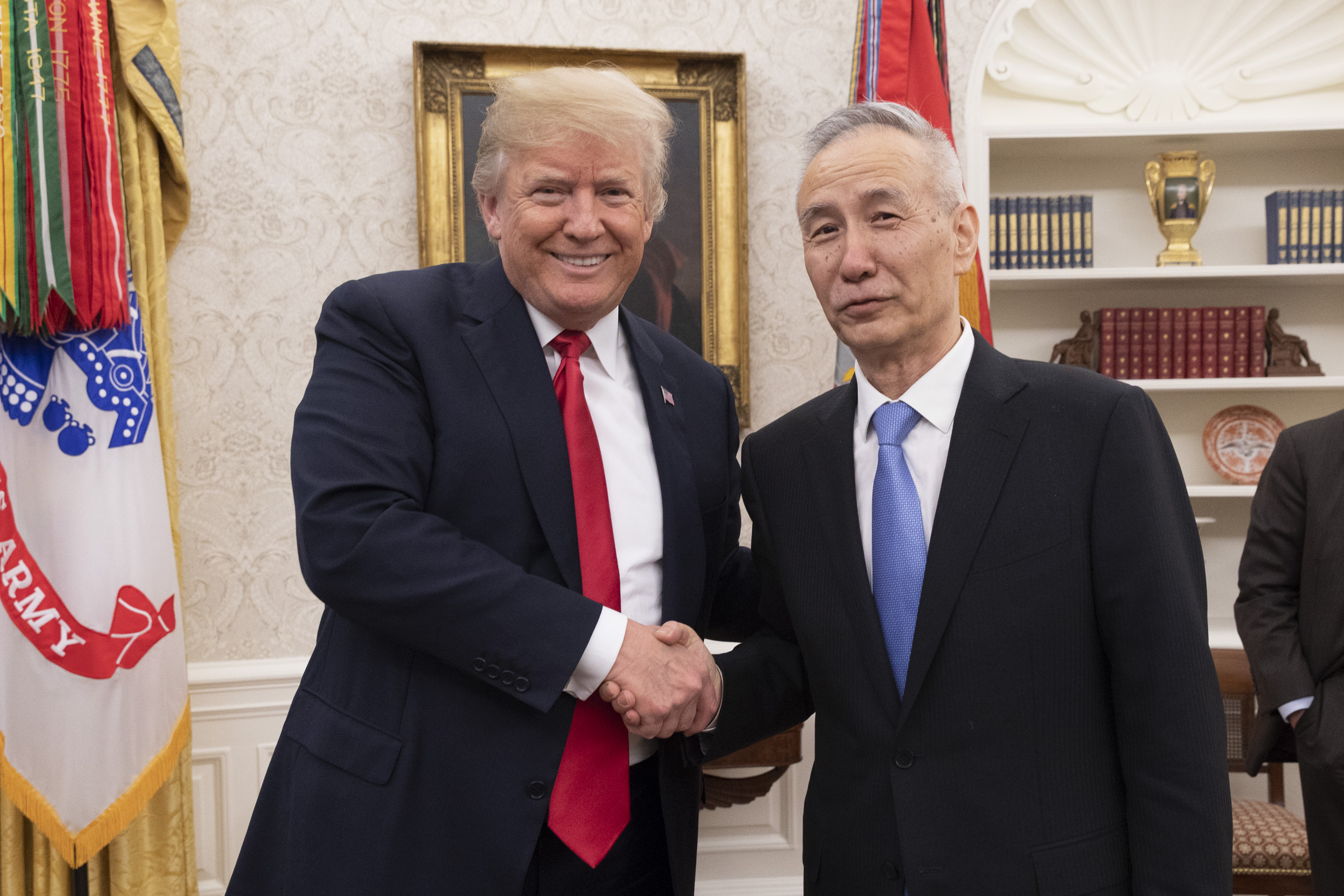
Liu with U.S. President Donald Trump in the Oval Office, 2018

At the CCP 19th National Congress in October 2017, Liu was promoted to the CCP Politburo. He also was put in charge of the newly established Financial Stability and Development Committee in November. In March 2018, Liu He was appointed as a vice premier in charge of finance and economic structural reforms in Li Keqiang Government.

As vice premier, Liu has significantly contributed to Xi's key economic concepts such as "economic new normal" and "supply-side reform".

In May 2018, Liu He was also appointed top trade negotiator for the China–United States trade war. In early October 2019, Liu He negotiated with his US counterparts on a preliminary trade deal.

Liu is generally considered to hold economically liberal views. He gave a keynote address to the 2018 World Economic Forum in Davos.

He has been one of the key officials in the crackdown on Ant Group.

=== Retirement ===
Liu retired from the Politburo in October 2022, after the 20th CCP National Congress, as well as from vice premiership in March 2023, after the first session of the 14th National People's Congress. He also retired as the director of the Office of the Central Financial and Economic Affairs Commission by October 2023, where Vice Premier He Lifeng took over the position. Nevertheless, he was reported to still be influential after his retirement, still attending meetings on economic affairs, and being asked to give input on dealing with the US on trade and economic issues, as well as on domestic economic policies. Liu also met with US Treasury Secretary Janet Yellen in July 2023 and April 2024.

== Family ==
Liu is married. His son Liu Tianran, is the founder of Tianyi Ziteng Asset Management (alternatively known as Skycus Capital) and served as its chairman until April 2017. In April 2025, the Financial Times reported that Liu Tianran was put under investigation over suspected financial-related corruption.

== Notes ==
Government offices
| New title | Director of the National Informatization Expert Advisory Committee; 2001–2003 | Succeeded by Qu Weizhi |
| Preceded by Liu Yandong | Deputy Head of the National Science and Technology Leading Group; 2018–present | Incumbent |
Party political offices
| Preceded by Li Wei | Party Branch Secretary of Development Research Center of the State Council; 2011–2013 | Succeeded by Wang Anshun |
| New title | Deputy Party Branch Secretary of the National Development and Reform Commission; 2014–2018 | Succeeded by Mu Hong |
| Preceded by Zhu Zhixin | Director of the Office of the Central Financial and Economic Commission; 2013–present | Incumbent |
