= Tang Renjian =

Chinese politician (born 1962)

- 唐仁健
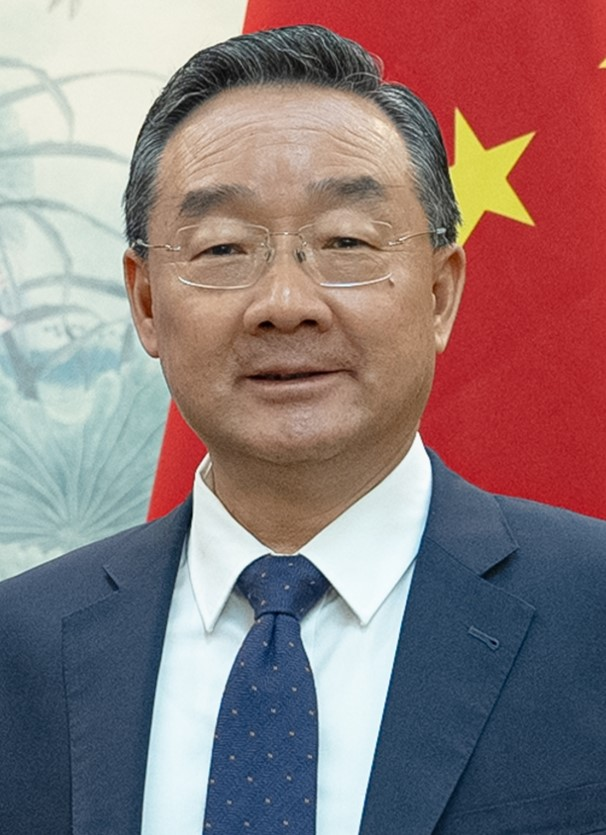
- Tang in 2024

Minister of Agriculture and Rural Affairs
- In office 26 December 2020 – 13 September 2024
- Premier: Li Keqiang; Li Qiang
- Preceded by: Han Changfu
- Succeeded by: Han Jun

Director of the Office of the Central Rural Work Leading Group
- In office 26 December 2020 – 14 October 2023
- Leader: Hu Chunhua
- Preceded by: Han Changfu
- Succeeded by: Han Wenxiu

Governor of Gansu
- In office 11 April 2017 – 3 December 2020
- Preceded by: Lin Duo
- Succeeded by: Ren Zhenhe

Personal details
- Born: August 1962 (age 64) Chongqing, China
- Party: Chinese Communist Party (1991–2024; expelled)
- Education: Southwestern University of Finance and Economics

Tang Renjian (Chinese: 唐仁健; pinyin: Táng Rénjiàn; born August 1962) is a Chinese convicted criminal and former politician who served as Minister of Agriculture and Rural Affairs from 2020 to 2024. He formerly served as Chief of General Office of the Central Rural Work Leading Group and Governor of Gansu, and before that as deputy director of the Office of the Leading Group for Financial and Economic Affairs as well as Vice Chairman of the Guangxi Zhuang Autonomous Region.

== Biography ==
Tang Renjian was born in August 1962 in Chongqing. In March 1983, he graduated from the Southwestern University of Finance and Economics. Later he entered the Ministry of Agriculture, became the officer. In 1998, he moved to the Office of the Leading Group for Financial and Economic Affairs, became the supervisor.

In 2014, Tang was appointed as the Vice Chairman of Guangxi; in 2015, he was made Executive Vice Chairman.

In 2016, Tang returned to the Office of the Leading Group for Financial and Economic Affairs, became the deputy director.

Tang was appointed as the acting Governor of Gansu in April 2017, confirmed on May 5.

On 26 December 2020, Tang took office as Minister of Agriculture and Rural Affairs, succeeding Han Changfu.

=== Downfall ===
On 18 May 2024, Tang was suspected of "serious violations of laws and regulations" by the Central Commission for Discipline Inspection (CCDI), the party's internal disciplinary body, and the National Supervisory Commission, the highest anti-corruption agency of China. On 13 September 2024, he was removed as the Minister of Agriculture and Rural Affairs, and was replaced by Han Jun. On November 15, he was expelled from the Chinese Communist Party. On December 10, he was arrested by the Supreme People's Procuratorate.

In April 2025, Tang was indicted on suspicion of accepting bribes. On September 28, 2025, he was sentenced to death with reprieve for taking 268 million yuan in bribes.

Government offices
| Preceded by Huang Daowei | Executive Vice Chairman of Guangxi; 2015–2016 | Succeeded by Lan Tianli |
| Preceded by Lin Duo | Governor of Gansu; 2017–2020 | Succeeded by Ren Zhenhe |
| Preceded by Han Changfu | Minister of Agriculture and Rural Affairs; 2020–2024 | Succeeded by Han Jun |
Party political offices
| Preceded by Chen Xiwen | Chief of General Office of the Central Rural Work Leading Group (First Time); 2016–2017 | Succeeded by Han Jun |
| Preceded by Han Changfu | Chief of General Office of the Central Rural Work Leading Group (Second Time); 2020–2023 | Succeeded by Han Wenxiu |
