= China Economic Information Network =

Information network that analyses Chinese macroeconomics

China Economic Information Network (Chinese: 中国经济信息网) is a national information network that provides information and analyses of Chinese national macroeconomic trends. It is sponsored by the State Information Network. It was officially opened on December 3, 1996.
