= Shanghai Ocean University =

Public university in Shanghai, China

- 上海海洋大学
- Former name: Shanghai Fisheries University (1985–2008)
- Motto: Chinese: 勤 朴 忠 实
- Motto in English: "Diligent, Plain, Loyal, Honest"
- Type: Public research university
- Established: December 1912; 113 years ago
- Academic affiliations: Double First-Class Construction
- President: Rong Wan
- Faculty: 800 (2023)
- Administrative staff: 700 (2023)
- Students: 17,700 (2023)
- Undergraduates: 12,000 (2023)
- Postgraduates: 5,700 (2023)
- Location: Pudong, Shanghai, China; 30°53′09″N 121°53′34″E
- Campus: Total: 1.1 square kilometres (270 acres); Midsize city
- Colors: Ocean Blue
- Nickname: SHOU
- Website: www.shou.edu.cn

Shanghai Ocean University (SHOU) is a public research university in Shanghai, China, dedicated to the study of aquaculture, marine science and engineering. This university is a part of the Double First-Class Initiative. It is sponsored by the Ministry of Natural Resources of China, the Ministry of Agriculture and Rural Affairs of China, and the Shanghai Municipal Government.

Founded in 1912, the university has been a fisheries higher education institution, known as Jiangsu Provincial Fisheries School, founded by Zhang Jian and Huang Yanpei. In 1952, it became Shanghai Fisheries College and then was renamed Shanghai Ocean University in 2008.

It enrolls approximately 12,098 undergraduate students and 5,700 graduate students. The university consists of 14 colleges and offers degree programs at undergraduate and graduate levels.

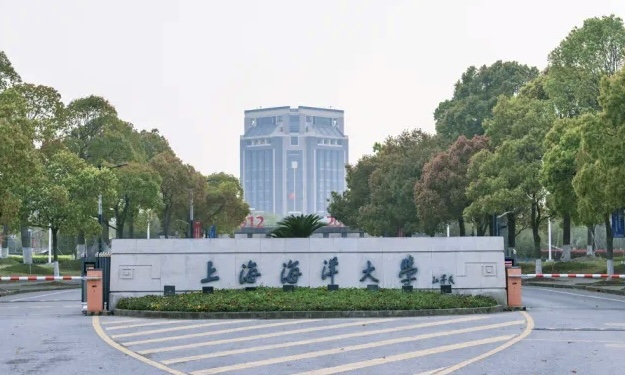
Gate of Shanghai Ocean University, Pudong (Lingang Campus)

== Academics ==
Five disciplines at Shanghai Ocean University (Plant and Animal Science, Agricultural Sciences, Environment and Ecology, Engineering, and Biology and Biochemistry) rank among the world's top 1% according to the Clarivate Essential Science Indicators (ESI). In 2016, the university launched Aquaculture and Fisheries, the first English fisheries science journal published in mainland China, in partnership with Elsevier and KeAi Publishing.

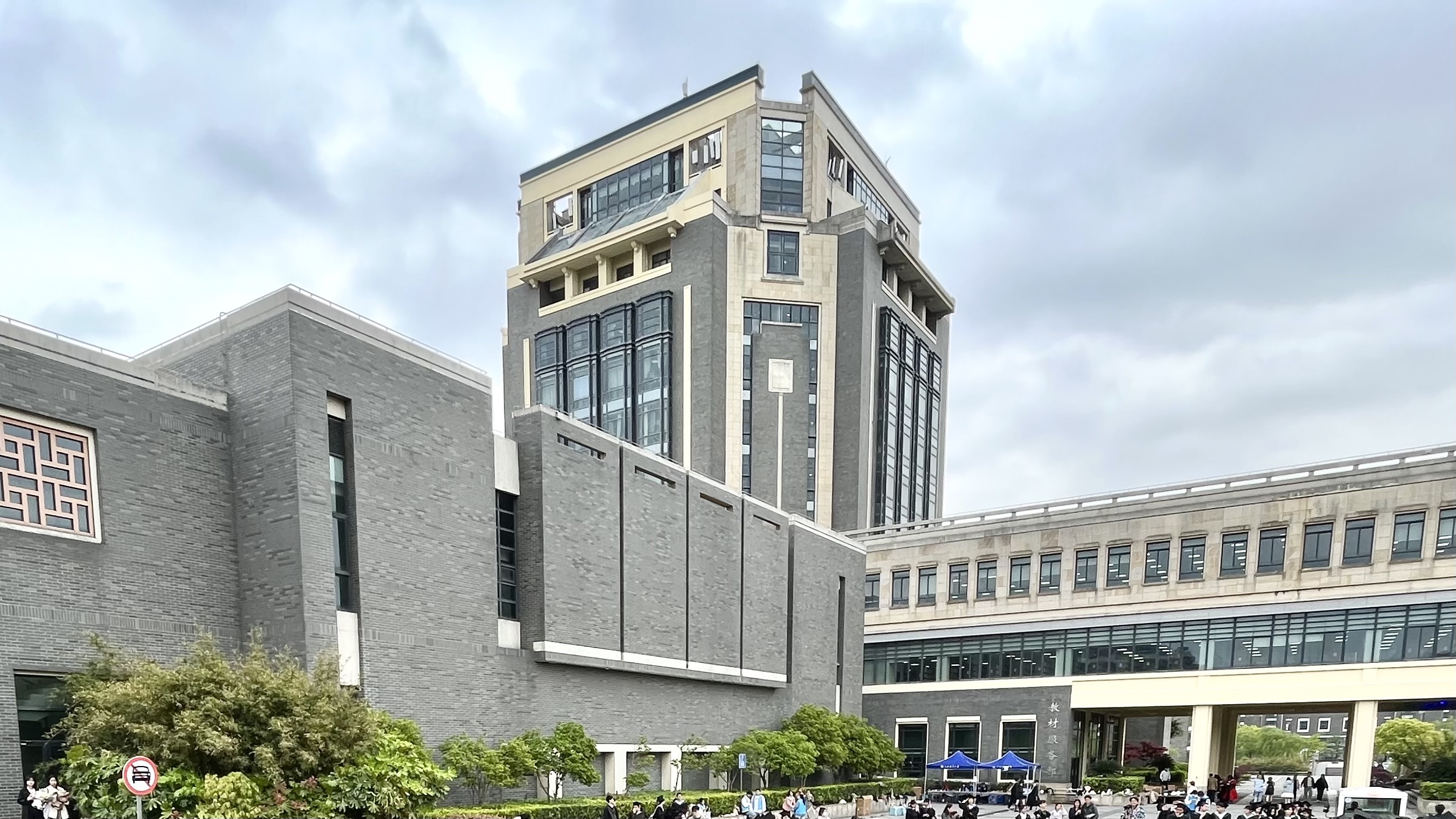
Library Building on Lingang Campus of Shanghai Ocean University

=== Aquaculture and Fisheries ===
- Ichthyology
- Aquatic Animal Breeding and Propagation
- Fish Disease Prevention and Control
- Fish Nutrition and Feed Science
- Fish Genetic Resources and Germplasm Conservation

=== Fisheries Engineering and Resource Management ===
- Fishing Gear Technology and Methodology
- Fisheries Machinery and Engineering
- Fisheries Resource Conservation and Management

=== Fisheries Policy and Economics ===
- Fisheries Law and Policy
- Fisheries Economics

=== Marine Environmental Science and Ecology ===
- Marine Ecology
- Seaweed Cell Engineering

=== Life Sciences and Biotechnology ===
- Biotechnology

=== Food Science and Technology ===
- Food Science and Engineering
- Refrigeration and Cryogenic Technology

== Rankings and reputation ==
As of 2023, Shanghai Ocean University is ranked among the world's top 800-900th universities according to the Academic Ranking of World Universities. As of 2021, the U.S. News & World Report ranks Shanghai Ocean University at 499th among the best universities in Asia. The university ranked no. 1 nationwide in "Marine fisheries science and technology" in the recognized Best Chinese Universities Ranking.

== Campuses ==
- Main Campus - Shanghai Ocean University, Pudong (Lingang Campus)
- Shanghai Ocean University, Yangpu (Jungong Road Campus)

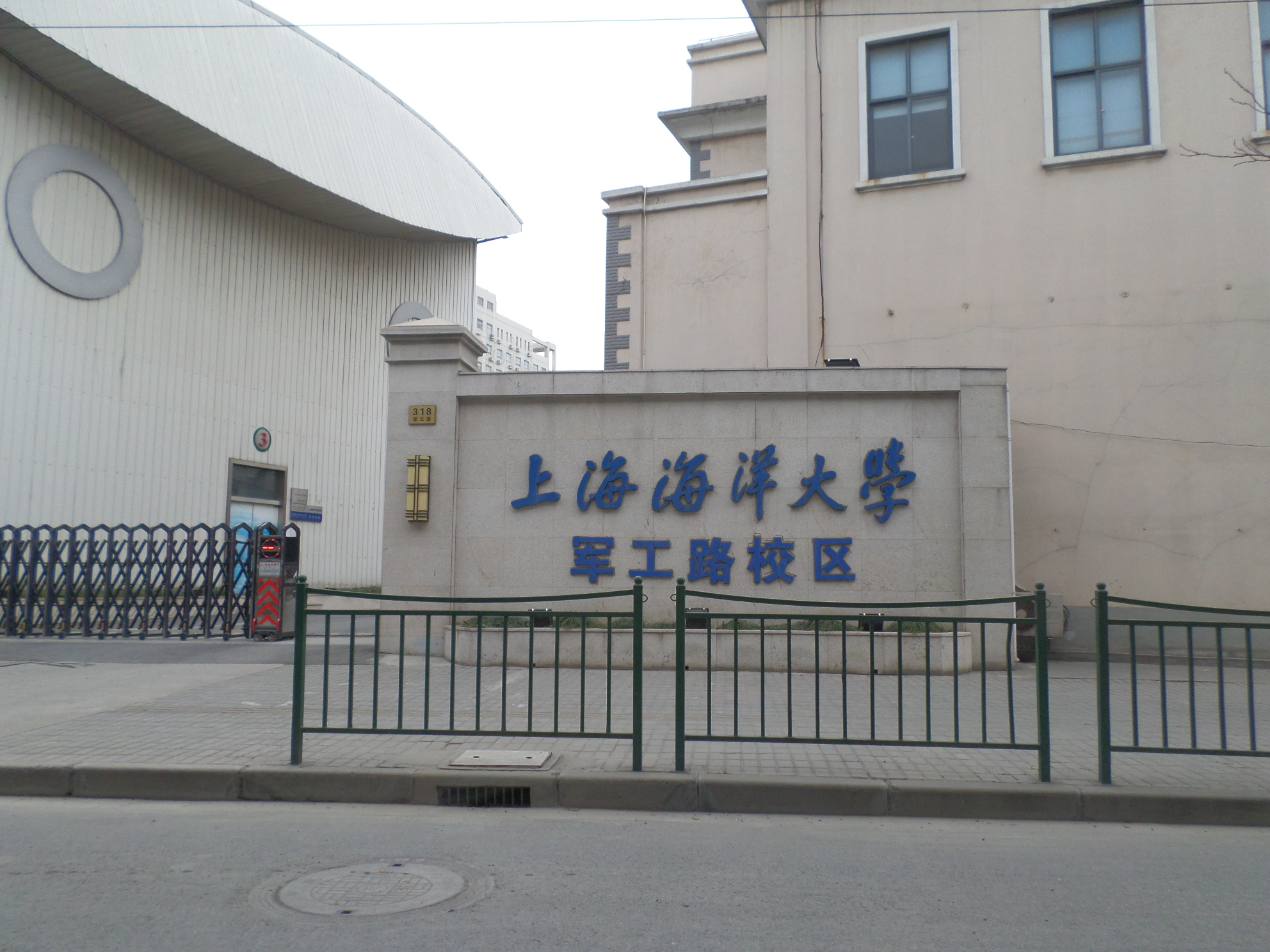
Shanghai Ocean University, Yangpu
