= Central Rural Work Leading Group =

Rural affairs organization of the Chinese Communist Party

- 中央农村工作领导小组; Zhōngyāng Nóngcūn Gōngzuò Lǐngdǎo Xiǎozǔ
- Emblem of the Chinese Communist Party

Agency overview
- Formed: March 1993; 33 years ago
- Type: Leading small group
- Jurisdiction: Chinese Communist Party
- Headquarters: Beijing
- Agency executives: Liu Guozhong, Leader; Liu Guozhong, Deputy Director; Han Wenxiu, Office Director
- Parent agency: Central Committee of the Chinese Communist Party
- Child agency: Ministry of Agriculture and Rural Affairs

Central Rural Work Leading Group
- Simplified Chinese: 中央农村工作领导小组
Transcriptions
Standard Mandarin
- Hanyu Pinyin: Zhōngyāng Nóngcūn Gōngzuò Lǐngdǎo Xiǎozǔ

The Central Rural Work Leading Group is a coordination body set up under the Central Committee of the Chinese Communist Party for the purpose of managing rural affairs.

== History ==
The central leading group was established in March 1993 by the Central Committee of the CCP.

From 2018, the General Office of the leading group was co-located in the Ministry of Agriculture and Rural Affairs. In mid-2023, the General Office was merged with the Office of the Central Financial and Economic Affairs Commission.

== Role ==
The group is the CCP's leading body on rural and agricultural affairs.

== Leadership ==
=== Leader ===
- Zhu Rongji (March 1993–September 1994)
- Jiang Chunyun (September 1994–March 1998)
- Wen Jiabao (March 1998–March 2003)
- Hui Liangyu (March 2003–March 2013)
- Wang Yang (March 2013–March 2018)
- Hu Chunhua (March 2018–March 2023)
- Liu Guozhong (March 2023–Incumbent)

=== Deputy Leader ===
- Wen Jiabao (March 1993–March 1998)
- Chen Junsheng (March 1993–March 1998, served concurrently with Wen Jiabao)
- Ma Zhongchen (September 2000–January 2003)
- Hui Liangyu (January 2003–March 2003)
- Xu Youfang (March 2003–March 2008)
- Tian Chengping (March 2008–October 2014)
- Yuan Chunqing (September 2014–November 2017)
- Tang Renjian (June 2016–March 2017)
- Han Changfu (April 2018–November 2020)
- Chen Quanguo (June 2022–October 2022)
- Ma Xingrui

=== Office Director ===
- Han Jun (November 2015–March 2018)
- Tang Renjian (June 2016–March 2017)
- Han Changfu (April 2018–November 2020, concurrently serving as Deputy Leader)
- Tang Renjian (December 2020–September 2023)
- Han Wenxiu (October 2023–Incumbent)

=== Deputy Office Director ===
- Tang Renjian (June 2006–April 2014)

== See also ==
- Central Rural Work Conference
