= Central Rural Work Conference =

Chinese government gathering

Central Urban Work Conference
- Simplified Chinese: 中央农村工作会议
- Traditional Chinese: 中央農村工作會議
Transcriptions
Standard Mandarin
- Hanyu Pinyin: Zhōngyāng Nóngcūn Gōngzuò Huìyì

The Central Rural Work Conference is the highest-level conference in China in regards to rural work held annually.

== History ==
At the Central Rural Work Conference in December 2012, Agriculture Minister Han Changfu called for the gap between the incomes of urban and rural residents to be narrowed.

At the Central Rural Work Conference in December 2021, CCP General Secretary Xi Jinping said "The food of the Chinese people must be made by and remain in the hands of the Chinese".

At the Central Rural Work Conference in December 2025, CCP General Secretary Xi Jinping called for a modernized, industrialized rural economy.

== Functions ==
The conference is held annually, and sets China's rural policy for the upcoming year.
