= Farmers' Daily =

Farmers' Daily (农民日报)
- Type: Daily newspaper
- Format: Broadsheet, typically 8 pages per issue
- Owner: Ministry of Agriculture and Rural Affairs of the People's Republic of China
- Publisher: Farmers' Daily Press
- Founded: 1980-04-06
- Language: Simplified Chinese
- Headquarters: No. 15 Huixin West Street, Chaoyang District, Beijing
- Circulation: Approximately 400,000 copies
- Price: 1.35 RMB per issue
- Website: farmer.com.cn

Farmers' Daily (simplified Chinese: 农民日报; traditional Chinese: 農民日報; pinyin: Nóngmín Rìbào), or "Nongmin Ribao", is the official newspaper of the Ministry of Agriculture and Rural Affairs of the People's Republic of China. Founded in 1980 as China's first farmers newspaper distributed nationwide, it is now a central-level comprehensive newspaper with a daily circulation of 400,000 copies, promoting the government's policies on agriculture, countryside and farmers. The newspaper's name was personally inscribed by Deng Xiaoping.

== History ==
On April 6, 1980, the newspaper "China Farmers' Daily" was founded by the CPC Central Committee Rural Policy Research Office and the State Council Rural Development Research Center. It was the first newspaper in China to be distributed nationwide to rural areas and a national, comprehensive, central-level Party newspaper. Initially Farmers' Daily was a weekly publication. The first issue was printed by the People's Daily with a total of 200,000 copies, each priced at 4 cents.

In July 1980, the publication frequency was changed from weekly to bi-weekly.

In 1982, the newspaper began to be publicly distributed overseas.

In January 1983, it became tri-weekly.

In January 1985, the newspaper was renamed "Farmers' Daily", and the frequency increased to six times a week (excluding Sundays). The title of the paper was personally inscribed by Deng Xiaoping, the chief architect of China's reform and opening up.

In 1988, the newspaper's daily circulation reached 400,000 copies.

In 1989, Farmers' Daily was placed under the leadership of the Ministry of Agriculture (now the Ministry of Agriculture and Rural Affairs).

In 1993, the circulation of the Farmers' Daily plummeted from a historical high of 680,000 copies to below 200,000.

On July 16, 2004, the "San Nong Online" website was officially launched, later renamed China Agricultural News Network, and now known as China Agricultural Network (www.farmer.com.cn).

In 2018, Farmers' Daily was awarded the title of "Top 100 Newspapers in China".

In 2023, Farmers' Daily won one first prize and two third prizes at the 33rd China News Awards.

== Features ==
Farmers' Daily is an agricultural comprehensive newspaper distributed nationwide to the country's rural areas. The title was personally inscribed by Deng Xiaoping.

Farmers' Daily usually has 8 pages. The first page is for main news; the second, third, and fourth pages are for general news. Page 5 to 8 are special pages focusing on agricultural industry and rural areas governance. It is affiliated with the All-China Farmers' Daily Association with other agricultural newspapers in other provinces and cities. Farmers' Daily has an electronic version, a mobile app, and the China Agricultural News Network.

Since its founding, Farmers' Daily has been a major platform for disseminating policies concerning the “三农” (agriculture, countryside, farmers). It has 32 reporter stations in all provinces (and autonomous regions and municipalities) and cities with independent planning status across the country.

== Subsidiary publications ==
Farmers' Daily also oversees several specialized newspapers, including:

- China Agricultural Mechanization Herald (中国农机化导报)
- China Rural Credit Cooperative News (中国农村信用合作报)
- Chinese Animal Husbandry and Veterinary News (中国畜牧兽医报)
- Chinese Fishery News (中国渔业报).

== See also ==
- Ministry of Agriculture and Rural Affairs of the People's Republic of China
