= Han Wenxiu =

Chinese politician

- 韩文秀
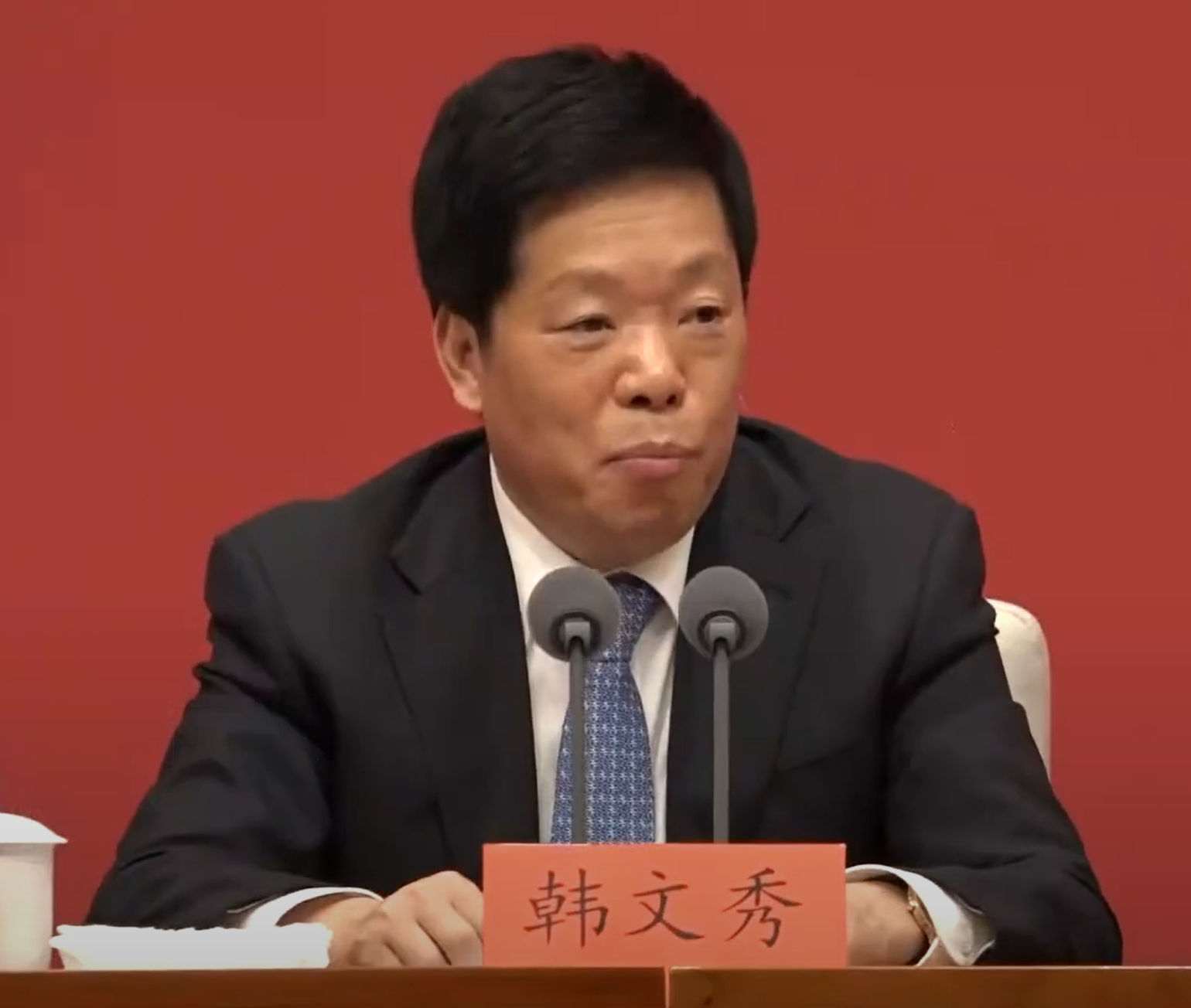
- Han in October 2020

Director of the Office of the Central Rural Work Leading Group
- Incumbent
- Assumed office October 2023
- Preceded by: Tang Renjian

Executive Deputy Director of the Office of the Central Financial and Economic Affairs Commission
- Incumbent
- Assumed office December 2018
- Director: Liu He

Personal details
- Born: September 1963 (age 63) Zanhuang County, Hebei, China
- Party: Chinese Communist Party
- Education: Peking University; Renmin University of China; Oxford University

Chinese name
- Simplified Chinese: 韩文秀
- Traditional Chinese: 韓文秀
Transcriptions
Standard Mandarin
- Hanyu Pinyin: Hán Wénxiù

Han Wenxiu (Chinese: 韩文秀; born September 1963) is a Chinese economist and politician, currently serving as executive deputy director of the Office of the Central Financial and Economic Affairs Commission and director of the Office of the Central Rural Work Leading Group.

He is a representative of the 20th National Congress of the Chinese Communist Party and a member of the 20th Central Committee of the Chinese Communist Party.

== Biography ==
Han was born in Zanhuang County, Hebei, in September 1963. In 1980, he enrolled at Peking University where he received his bachelor's degree in 1984 and his master's degree in 1989 both in economics. He also received his doctor's degree in finance in 2010 from the Renmin University of China. He studied at Oxford University between September 1992 and September 1993.

Han worked at the Economic Research Center of the State Planning Commission (now Macroeconomic Research Institute of National Development and Reform Commission) from January 1989 to July 1997. He then worked in other departments of the National Development and Reform Commission till 2005.

In March 2005, Han became leader of Macroeconomic Group of the Central Financial Leading Group Office, a post he kept until August 2011, when he was appointed deputy director of the State Council Research Office.

In April 2018, Han was recalled to the Office of the Central Financial and Economic Affairs Commission and appointed deputy director. In December, he was promoted again to become executive deputy director, a position at ministerial level.

In October 2023, Han was revealed to be the director of the Office of the Central Rural Work Leading Group.

== Publications ==
- 政府工作的总体要求和需要把握的重点 (in Chinese). Beijing: China Yanshi Publishing House. 2010. ISBN 9787517127246.
- 人民币迈向国际货币 [RMB Moves Towards International Currency] (in Chinese). Beijing: Economic Science Press. 2011. ISBN 9787514104172.
- 回头看：经济分析的前瞻性和可靠性 [Looking Back: Forward-looking and Reliable Economic Analysis] (in Chinese). Beijing: Economic Science Press. 2013. ISBN 9787514128789.
- 做好十三五时期经济社会发展工作须着力把握好三个关 (in Chinese). Beijing: China Yanshi Publishing House. 2016. ISBN 9787517118398.
- 建言中国经济成长 [Suggestions on China's Economic Growth] (in Chinese). Beijing: China Yanshi Publishing House. 2018. ISBN 9787517127918.
