= Zhu Zhixin (politician) =

Chinese politician

- 朱之鑫
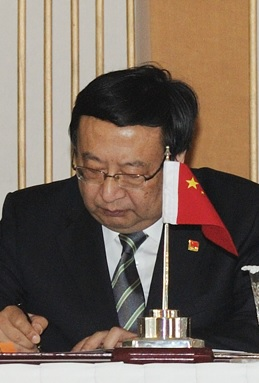
- Zhu Zhixin in 2010

Director of the Office of the Central Leading Group for Financial and Economic Affairs
- In office July 2007 – March 2013
- Preceded by: Wang Chunzheng
- Succeeded by: Liu He

Director of the National Bureau of Statistics
- In office June 2000 – May 2003
- Preceded by: Liu Hong
- Succeeded by: Li Deshui

Personal details
- Born: 27 March 1949 (age 77) Jiaxing, Zhejiang, China
- Party: Chinese Communist Party

Zhu Zhixin (Chinese: 朱之鑫; pinyin: Zhū Zhīxīn; born 27 March 1949) is a former Chinese politician and economic official. He served as vice chairman and deputy Communist Party chief of the National Development and Reform Commission.

== Biography ==
Zhu was born in Jiaxing, Zhejiang, and received a postgraduate degree. He holds the title of doctorate supervisor.

He started working in 1969 and was initially sent to work in rural Da'an County of Jilin Province. He later served at Changchun First Automotive Works (FAW), the First Ministry of Mechanical Industry, and the general office of the Anhui provincial government. In September 1983, he entered the National Planning Commission, and was elevated to the position of section chief of the national economics general section of the Commission. He also served as vice director of the Dalian municipal planning commission for training. In March 1993, he became vice director of the national economics general section of the National Planning Commission, and was promoted to director in April 1997. In September 1999, he was appointed vice director and vice Party chief of the National Bureau of Statistics of China. He was promoted to director and Party chief in June 2000. In March 2003, he became the vice chairman of the National Development and Reform Commission, and was vice Party chief from August 2005.

Zhu retired in December 2014, having reached the mandatory retirement age for ministerial level officials of 65.

Zhu was an alternate member of the 16th Central Committee of the Chinese Communist Party, and a full member of the 17th Central Committee.

Party political offices
Preceded by Liu Hong	Director of the National Bureau of Statistics; 2000–2003	Succeeded by Li Deshui
Government offices
Preceded by Wang Chunzheng	Director of the Office of the Central Leading Group for Financial and Economic Affairs; 2007–2013	Succeeded by Liu He
