= New normal (China) =

Chinese Communist Party political slogan

New normal (Chinese: 新常态; pinyin: Xīn chángtài) is a political slogan promoted by the Chinese Communist Party (CCP). It was coined by CCP General Secretary Xi Jinping during a visit to Henan Province in May 2014.

== History ==
Since 2012, China's economy has shown a marked slowdown, with growth rates declining from double digit levels (before the 2008 financial crisis) to around 7% in 2014. A statement by CCP General Secretary Xi Jinping during a visit to Henan in May 2014 indicated that China was entering a 'new normal'. Xi systematically expounded the term at the Asia-Pacific Economic Cooperation (APEC) Business Leaders Summit in November of that year.

This term was subsequently popularised by the press and came to refer to expectations of 7% growth rates in China for the foreseeable future. It was indicative of the Chinese government's anticipation of moderate but perhaps more stable economic growth in the medium-to-long term.

== Definition ==
The official definition of the new normal is the model of China's economic development under the new situation, which has three characteristics:

- economic growth rate drops from high speed to medium speed
- economic structure (urban-rural regional gap, economic industrial structure) optimization
- growth momentum shifts from investment to innovation
