= Ministry of Agriculture and Rural Affairs =

Chinese government agency for rural development

Ministry of Agriculture and Rural Affairs of the People's Republic of China
- 中华人民共和国农业农村部; Zhōnghuá Rénmín Gònghéguó Nóngyè Nóngcūnbù
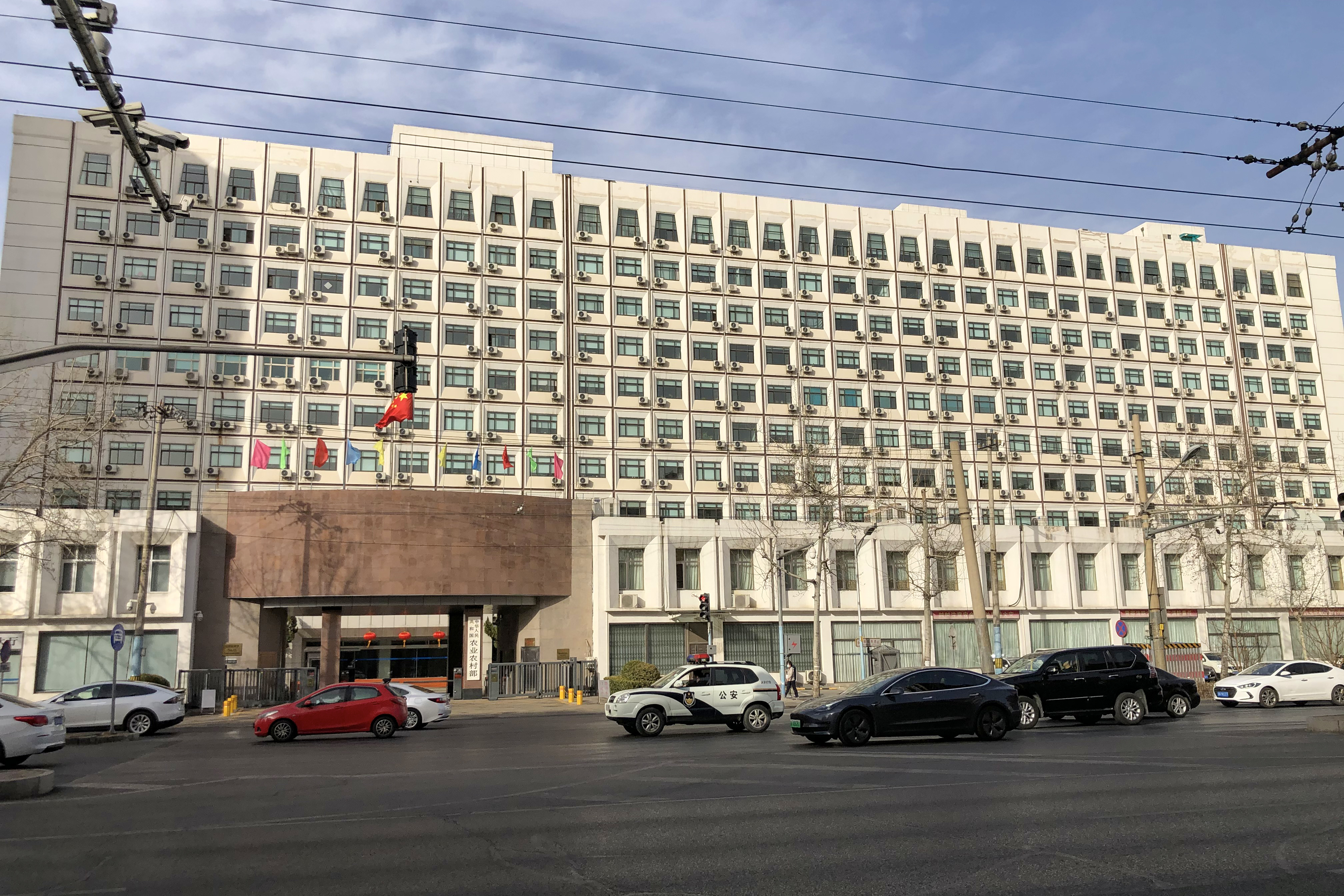

Agency overview
- Formed: March 19, 2018; 8 years ago
- Preceding agency: Ministry of Agriculture
- Type: Constituent Department of the State Council (cabinet-level executive department)
- Jurisdiction: Government of China
- Headquarters: Beijing
- Minister responsible: Han Jun, Minister
- Deputy Ministers responsible: Deng Xiaogang; Ma Youxiang; Wu Hongyao; Zhang Xingwang
- Agency executives: Wu Qinghai, Leader of Discipline Inspection & Supervision Team; Wu Kongming, President of Academy of Agricultural Sciences; Zeng Yande, Chief Agricultural Expert; Li Jinxiang, Chief Vet; Zhang Tianzuo, Chief Shepherd; Wei Baigang, Chief Economist
- Parent agency: State Council
- Website: english.moa.gov.cn

Chinese name
- Simplified Chinese: 中华人民共和国农业农村部
- Traditional Chinese: 中華人民共和國農業農村部
Transcriptions
Standard Mandarin
- Hanyu Pinyin: Zhōnghuá Rénmín Gònghéguó Nóngyè Nóngcūnbù

The Ministry of Agriculture and Rural Affairs of the People's Republic of China is the cabinet-level executive department of the State Council which is responsible for agriculture and rural affairs in the country. The ministry is headquartered in Beijing. It was formed on March 19, 2018, as the agency superseding the former Ministry of Agriculture.

== History ==
On March 19, 2018, the Ministry of Agriculture and Rural Affairs was created at the first session of the 13th National People's Congress as part of the deepening the reform of the Party and state institutions, superseding the Ministry of Agriculture. That same day, Han Changfu was elected Minister of Agriculture and Rural Affairs. It was also announced that some of its additional responsibilities come from the agricultural investment projects of the National Development and Reform Commission, the Ministry of Finance, the Ministry of Land and Resources, and the Ministry of Water Resources.

The Ministry stated in late 2020 that it would designate 6.6 million hectares of prime agricultural land as grain zones to be farmed with high production methods and which could not be converted to other crops. It also raised subsidies for rice, corn, and soybean growing.

In March 2023, it gained responsibilities related to rural science and technology from the Ministry of Science and Technology as part of the plan on reforming Party and state institutions. It also absorbed the National Rural Revitalization Administration.

== Functions ==
The Ministry is responsible for handling the "three rural issues"; namely agriculture, rural areas, and farmers. It is responsible for managing fisheries, animal husbandry, farmland resources, irrigation projects, land reclamation and agricultural mechanization, checking agricultural product quality and safety, and managing agricultural investments. It also houses the Office of the Central Rural Work Leading Group.

== See also ==
- History of agriculture in China
- Farmers' Daily
