= State Information Center =

Chinese government think tank

- 国家信息中心
- Formation: 1987; 38 years ago
- Type: Government think tank
- Parent organization: National Development and Reform Commission
- Website: www.sic.gov.cn

The State Information Center is a policy think tank within the National Development and Reform Commission of the People's Republic of China (PRC), established in 1987. The State Information Center sponsors the China Economic Information Network, a national information network that provides broad information sources about the PRC's economic activities. The State Information Center serves the interests of the PRC government and its policies.

== See also ==
- National Development and Reform Commission
- Think tank
  - List of think tanks
