= Han Changfu =

Chinese politician (born 1954)

- 韩长赋
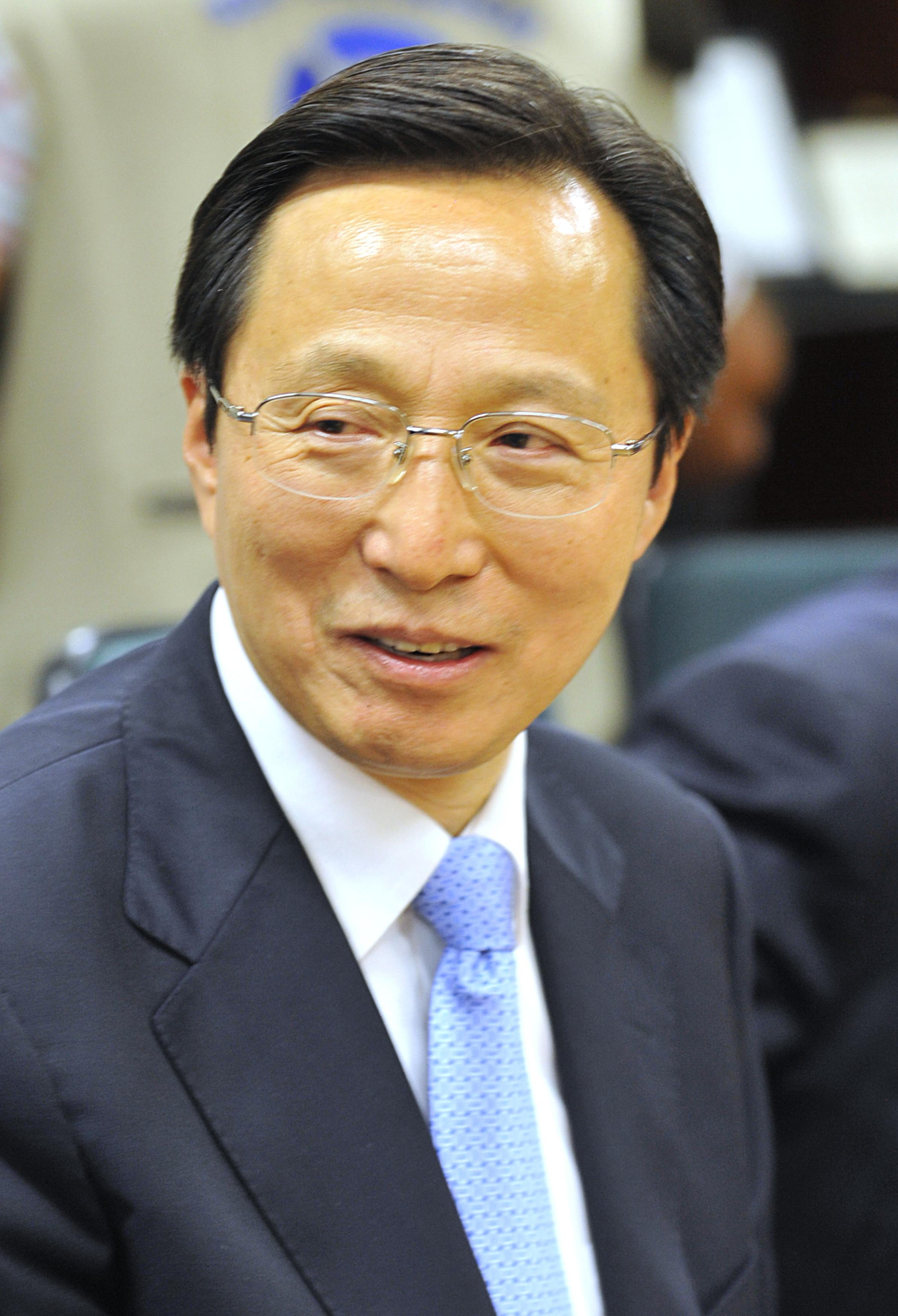

Minister of Agriculture and Rural Affairs
- In office 19 March 2018 – 26 December 2020
- Premier: Li Keqiang
- Preceded by: Himself (as the Minister of Agriculture)
- Succeeded by: Tang Renjian

Deputy Leader of the Central Rural Work Leading Group
- In office March 2018 – December 2020
- Leader: Hu Chunhua

Director of the Office of the Central Rural Work Leading Group
- In office March 2018 – December 2020
- Leader: Hu Chunhua
- Preceded by: Han Jun
- Succeeded by: Tang Renjian

Minister of Agriculture
- In office 26 December 2009 – 19 March 2018
- Premier: Wen Jiabao→Li Keqiang
- Preceded by: Sun Zhengcai
- Succeeded by: Post abolished

Governor of Jilin
- In office December 2006 – December 2009
- Preceded by: Wang Min
- Succeeded by: Wang Rulin

Personal details
- Born: October 10, 1954 (age 71) Bin County, Heilongjiang
- Party: Chinese Communist Party
- Education: Renmin University of China; Tsinghua University

Han Changfu
- Simplified Chinese: 韩长赋
- Traditional Chinese: 韓長賦
Transcriptions
Standard Mandarin
- Hanyu Pinyin: Hán Chángfù

Han Changfu (Chinese: 韩长赋; born 10 October 1954) is a Chinese politician. Until December 2020 he was Minister of Agriculture and Rural Affairs. Before he was Governor of Jilin.

== Biography ==
Han joined the Chinese Communist Party in January 1974. He holds a doctorate in law. He has previously held numerous positions in the Communist Youth League, as well as deputy director and vice Party secretary of the State Council Research Office. Han served as vice-Party secretary and vice governor of Jilin province, before becoming governor in January 2007. He served in this position before becoming minister of agriculture in December 2009.

Han is a member of the 17th, 18th, and 19th Central Committees of the Chinese Communist Party.

Government offices
New title	Minister of Agriculture and Rural Affairs; 2018–2020	Succeeded by Tang Renjian
Preceded by Sun Zhengcai	Minister of Agriculture of the People's Republic of China; 2009–2018	Succeeded by Post abolished
Preceded by Wang Min	Governor of Jilin; 2007–2009	Succeeded by Wang Rulin
