= Central Financial and Economic Affairs Commission =

Commission of the Central Committee of the Chinese Communist Party

- 中央财经委员会
- Emblem of the Chinese Communist Party

Agency overview
- Formed: March 1980
- Type: Policy coordination and consultation body
- Jurisdiction: Chinese Communist Party
- Headquarters: Huairen Hall, Zhongnanhai
- Agency executives: Xi Jinping, Director; Li Qiang, Deputy Director; He Lifeng, Office Director
- Parent agency: Central Committee of the Chinese Communist Party
- Child agency: Office of the Central Financial and Economic Affairs Commission

Central Financial and Economic Affairs Commission
- Simplified Chinese: 中央财经委员会
Transcriptions
Standard Mandarin
- Hanyu Pinyin: Zhōngyāng Cáijīng Wěiyuánhuì

The Central Financial and Economic Affairs Commission is a commission of the Central Committee of the Chinese Communist Party in charge of leading and supervising economic policy of both the CCP Central Committee and the State Council. The commission is generally headed by CCP General Secretary or Premier of China.

It is currently led by General Secretary Xi Jinping, with Premier Li Qiang as its deputy leader. The Commission coordinates closely with the National Development and Reform Commission and is considered the highest body for coordination and discussion on issues related to the economy. The Office of the commission, handling the daily affairs of the body, is currently headed by He Lifeng.

== History ==
The commission was originally established as the Central Leading Group for Financial and Economic Affairs (Chinese: 中央财经领导小组; pinyin: Zhōngyāng Cáijīng Lǐngdǎo Xiǎozǔ) in March 1980. The decision to establish this group was taken by the CCP Politburo Standing Committee on March 17, 1980, to replace the State Commission for Economy and Finance, so as to coordinate the work necessary to meet the requirements of Deng Xiaoping's reform and opening up.

In March 2018, the leading group was transformed into the Central Financial and Economic Affairs Commission as part of the deepening the reform of the Party and state institutions.

== Functions ==
The commission has traditionally been the core decision-making body of the CCP in regards to economic policy and public finance. It generally meets around twice a year to discuss the overall direction of the Chinese economy. The Office of the commission, handling the daily affairs of the body, is critical to coordinating high-level policymaking in economic and financial topics.

== Leaders ==
1. Zhao Ziyang (1980–1989, as Premier then CCP General Secretary)
2. Jiang Zemin (1989–2002, as CCP General Secretary)
3. Hu Jintao (2002–2012, as CCP General Secretary)
4. Xi Jinping (2012–present, as CCP General Secretary)

== Composition ==
=== 18th Committee ===
- Leader
  - Xi Jinping, General Secretary of the Chinese Communist Party, President of the People's Republic of China
- Deputy Leader
  - Li Keqiang, Politburo Standing Committee member, Premier of the People's Republic of China
- Director of General Office
  - Liu He
- Members
  - Liu Yunshan, Politburo Standing Committee member, First Secretary of the Secretariat
  - Zhang Gaoli, Politburo Standing Committee member, First Vice Premier
  - Liu Yandong, Politburo member, Vice Premier
  - Wang Yang, Politburo member, Vice Premier
  - Ma Kai, Politburo member, Vice Premier
  - Wang Huning, Politburo member, CCP Policy Research Office chief
  - Li Zhanshu, Politburo member, CCP General Office chief
  - Yang Jiechi, State Councilor in charge of Foreign Affairs
  - Yang Jing, Secretary-General of the State Council, Secretary of the Central Secretariat
  - Zhou Xiaochuan, Governor of the People's Bank of China
  - Fang Fenghui, PLA Chief of General Staff
  - Xiao Jie, Deputy Secretary-General of the State Council
  - Xu Shaoshi, Director of the National Development and Reform Commission
  - Miao Wei, Minister of Industry and Information Technology
  - Jiang Daming, Minister of Land and Resources
  - Chen Lei, Minister of Water Resources
  - Wang Yi, Minister of Foreign Affairs
  - Wang Zhigang, Deputy Minister of Science and Technology
  - Lou Jiwei, Minister of Finance
  - Zhou Shengxian, Minister of Environmental Protection
  - Yang Chuantang, Minister of Transport
  - Wu Xinxiong, Director of the National Energy Administration

=== 19th Committee ===
- Leader
  - Xi Jinping, General Secretary of the Chinese Communist Party, President of the People's Republic of China
- Deputy Leader
  - Li Keqiang, Politburo Standing Committee member, Premier of the People's Republic of China
- Director of General Office
  - Liu He, Politburo member, Vice Premier
- Executive Deputy Director of the General Office
  - Han Wenxiu (from December 2018)

=== 20th Committee ===
- Leader
  - Xi Jinping, General Secretary of the Chinese Communist Party, President of the People's Republic of China
- Deputy Leader
  - Li Qiang, Politburo Standing Committee, Premier of the People's Republic of China
- Director of General Office
  - He Lifeng, Politburo member, Vice Premier
- Executive Deputy Director of the General Office
  - Han Wenxiu
- Deputy Director of General Office
  - Yan Pengcheng
  - Yang Yinkai
  - Zhu Weidong
- Members
  - Cai Qi, Politburo Standing Committee, First Secretary of the Secretariat
  - Ding Xuexiang, Politburo Standing Committee, First Vice Premier

== Meetings ==
=== 19th Central Committee ===
	Date	Content	Ref.
1	April 2, 2018	Study the ideas and measures to win the three major battles; Study and approve the "Working Rules of the Central Finance and Economics Commission"; Listened to the report of the People's Bank of China on the ideas and measures to fight the battle to prevent and resolve major risks; Listened to the report of the State Council Poverty Alleviation Office on the ideas and measures for winning the battle against poverty; Listened to the report of the Ministry of Ecology and Environment on the ideas and measures to fight the tough battle against pollution	
2	July 13, 2018	Listened to the reports from the National Development and Reform Commission, the Ministry of Science and Technology, the Ministry of Industry and Information Technology, the Chinese Academy of Sciences, and the Chinese Academy of Engineering	
3	October 10, 2018	Study on improving my country's natural disaster prevention and control capabilities and the planning and construction of the Sichuan-Tibet Railway; Listened to the reports from the National Development and Reform Commission, the Ministry of Emergency Management, the Ministry of Natural Resources, the Ministry of Water Resources, the Ministry of Science and Technology and China Railway Corporation	
4	April 22, 2019	Study on the issues of filling the gaps in building a moderately prosperous society in all respects and the implementation of the spirit of the Central Economic Work Conference; Listened to the reports of the National Development and Reform Commission, the National Bureau of Statistics, the Ministry of Ecology and Environment, the State Council Leading Group Office of Poverty Alleviation and Development, the Central Rural Work Leading Group and the Ministry of Agriculture and Rural Affairs on the issue of filling the gaps in building a moderately prosperous society in all respects; Listened to the reports on the implementation of the spirit of the Central Economic Work Conference from the National Development and Reform Commission, the Ministry of Industry and Information Technology, the Ministry of Finance, the People's Bank of China and other departments	
5	August 26, 2019	Study the issues of promoting regional economic layout with complementary advantages and high-quality development, and improving industrial basic capabilities and industrial chain levels.; Listened to the reports from the National Development and Reform Commission, the National Bureau of Statistics, Shanghai, Guangdong, and Liaoning on promoting the formation of a regional economic layout with complementary advantages and high-quality development; Listened to the reports from the National Development and Reform Commission, the Ministry of Industry and Information Technology, the State-owned Assets Supervision and Administration Commission of the State Council, and the Chinese Academy of Engineering on improving the basic capabilities of the industry and the level of the industrial chain	
6	January 3, 2020	Study the issues of ecological protection and high-quality development in the Yellow River Basin and promote the construction of the Chengdu-Chongqing Twin Cities Economic Circle; Listened to the reports from the National Development and Reform Commission, the Ministry of Natural Resources, the Ministry of Ecology and Environment, the Ministry of Water Resources, and the Ministry of Culture and Tourism on the ecological protection and high-quality development of the Yellow River Basin; Listened to the reports from the National Development and Reform Commission, Chongqing Municipality and Sichuan Province on promoting the construction of the Chengdu-Chongqing Twin Cities Economic Circle	
7	April 10, 2020	Study on several major issues of the country's medium- and long-term economic and social development strategy	
8	September 9, 2020	Study on the smooth circulation of national economy and the construction of modern circulation system; Study the implementation of the decisions and arrangements made by the Central Financial and Economic Commission since the 19th CCP National Congress; Listened to the reports from the National Development and Reform Commission, the Ministry of Transport, the Ministry of Commerce, and the People's Bank of China on unblocking the national economic cycle and building a modern circulation system; Listened to the reports from the National Development and Reform Commission, the Ministry of Science and Technology, the Ministry of Industry and Information Technology, the Ministry of Ecology and Environment, the Ministry of Emergency Management, the People's Bank of China and other departments on the implementation of the decisions and arrangements of the Central Financial and Economic Commission since the 19th National Congress of the Chinese Communist Party	
9	March 15, 2021	Research on issues related to promoting the healthy development of the platform economy and the basic ideas and major measures for achieving carbon peak and carbon neutrality; Listened to the reports from the National Development and Reform Commission, the People's Bank of China and the State Administration for Market Regulation on promoting the healthy development of the platform economy; Listened to the reports from the National Development and Reform Commission, the Ministry of Ecology and Environment, and the Ministry of Natural Resources on the overall ideas and major measures for achieving carbon peak and carbon neutrality	
10	August 17, 2021	Study the issue of promoting common prosperity; Study on preventing and defusing major financial risks and ensuring financial stability and development; Listened to the reports from the National Development and Reform Commission, the Ministry of Finance, the Ministry of Human Resources and Social Security, and the Central Rural Work Office on solidly promoting common prosperity; Listened to reports from the People's Bank of China, China Banking and Insurance Regulatory Commission, China Securities Regulatory Commission, National Development and Reform Commission, and Ministry of Finance on preventing and resolving major financial risks and ensuring financial stability and development.	
11	April 26, 2022	Study on comprehensively strengthening infrastructure construction; Study the implementation of the decisions and arrangements made by the Central Financial and Economic Commission since the 19th CCP National Congress; Listened to the reports of the National Development and Reform Commission, the Ministry of Industry and Information Technology, the Ministry of Transport, the Ministry of Housing and Urban-Rural Development, the Ministry of Agriculture and Rural Affairs, the Ministry of Water Resources and other departments on comprehensively strengthening infrastructure construction; Listened to the reports from the National Development and Reform Commission, the Ministry of Science and Technology, the Ministry of Ecology and Environment, the Ministry of Agriculture and Rural Affairs, the Ministry of Emergency Management, the People's Bank of China and other departments on the implementation of the decisions and arrangements of the Central Financial and Economic Commission since the 19th National Congress of the Chinese Communist Party	

=== 20th Central Committee ===
	Date	Content	Ref.
1	May 5, 2023	Accelerate the construction of a modern industrial system; Supporting Chinese-style modernization with high-quality population development	
2	July 20, 2023	Strengthening the protection of cultivated land and the comprehensive transformation and utilization of saline-alkali land	
4	February 23, 2024	Large-scale equipment replacement and consumer product trade-in; Effectively reduce the logistics costs of the whole society	
6	July 1, 2025	Deepen the construction of a unified national market; High-quality development of the marine economy	
