= House of Switzerland =

Olympic guesthouse of the Swiss Confederation

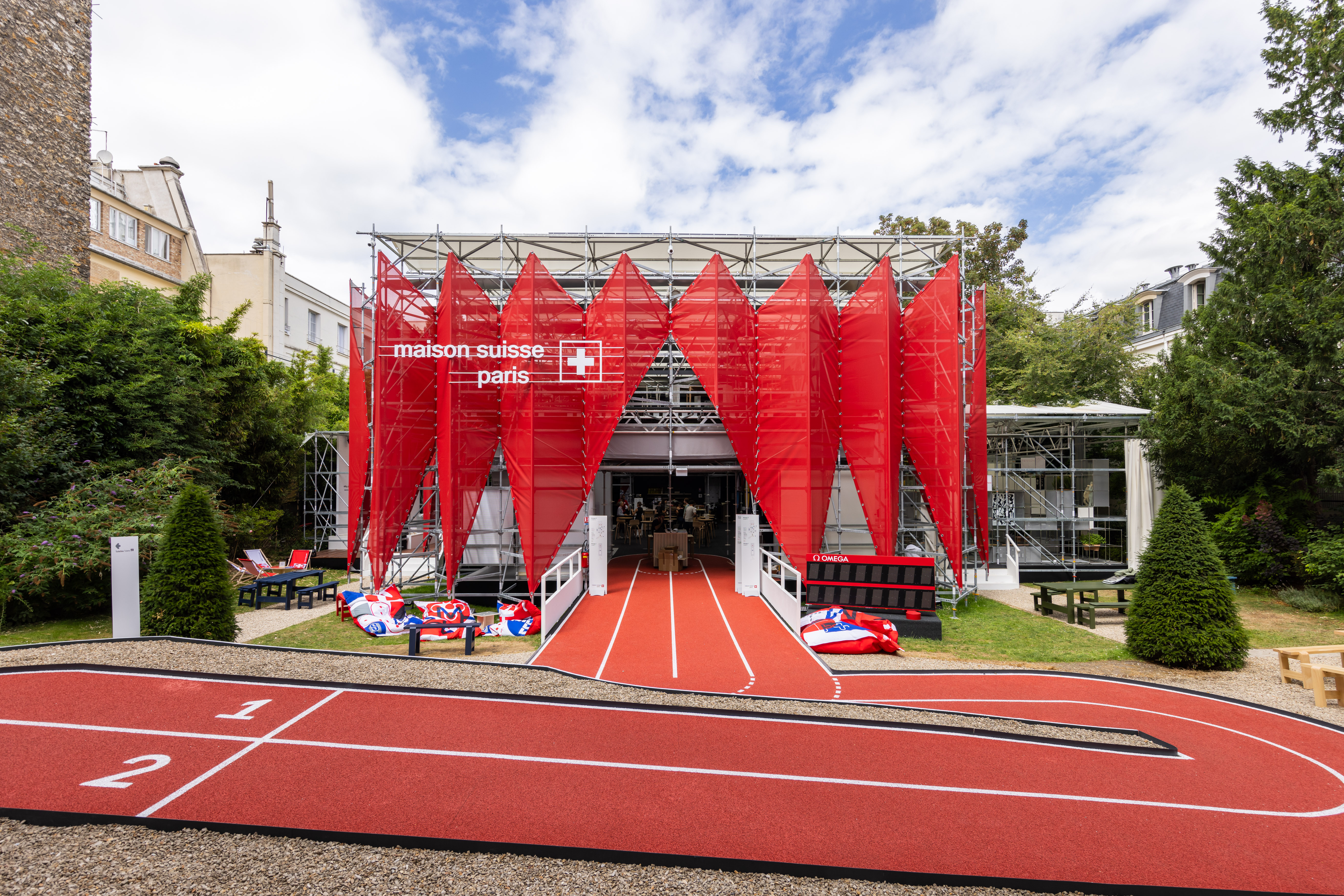
The House of Switzerland, called Maison Suisse, at the 2024 Summer Olympics and the 2024 Summer Paralympics in Paris in the garden of the Hôtel de Besenval, the Embassy of the Swiss Confederation.

The House of Switzerland is the official guesthouse of the Swiss Confederation, which is built, furnished and operated for the duration of the Olympic Games and the Paralympic Games. It is the official meeting point of the Swiss Olympic Team and the venue for the official medal celebrations of the Swiss medalists.

The House of Switzerland at the Olympic and Paralympic Games is open to the public.

== More than the Olympic Games ==
The name House of Switzerland – which has long since become a brand – is no longer used by the Swiss Confederation exclusively for projects related to the Olympic Games. Other official appearances of the Swiss Confederation – mainly abroad – now also operate under this name. Nevertheless, it is still the Houses of Switzerland at the Olympic Games that are best known to the public. What all official appearances under the name House of Switzerland have in common is that they are operated by the Federal Department of Foreign Affairs (FDFA), specifically by Presence Switzerland.

== History ==
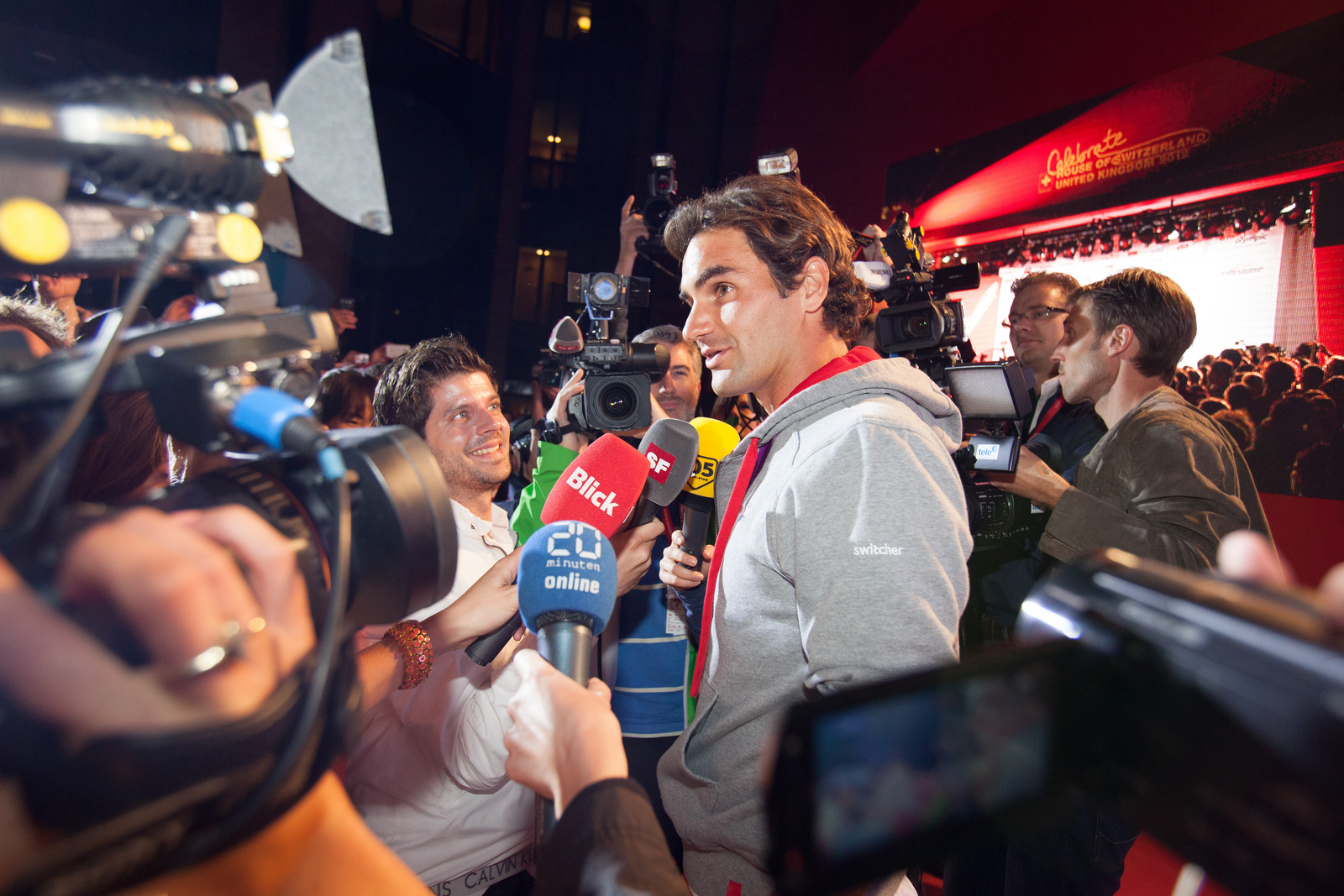
Roger Federer at the House of Switzerland, celebrating his silver medal at the 2012 Summer Olympics in London on 5 August 2012.

The tradition of the House of Switzerland dates back to 1998, when the House of Switzerland was first built for the 1998 Winter Olympics in Nagano, operated by the Swiss Olympic Association. The idea was to create a meeting point for the Swiss Olympic Team as well as the official Swiss delegations, but also for fans travelling from Switzerland.

=== More than sports ===
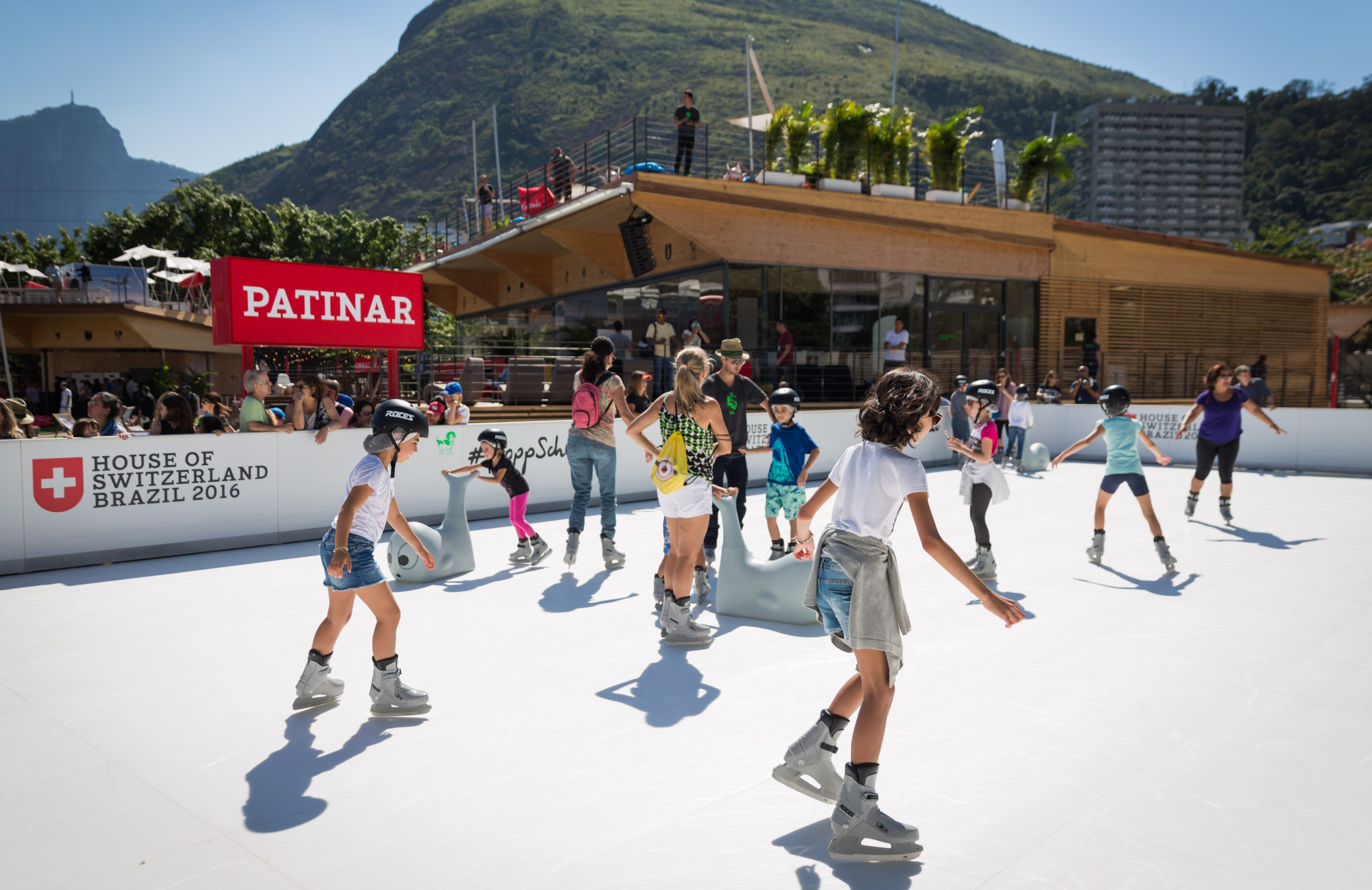
A crowd pleaser: The ice rink at the House of Switzerland at the 2016 Summer Olympics in Rio de Janeiro.

From the beginning, the central element of the concept was the operation of a restaurant serving Swiss specialties, combined with specialties from the respective host country, a concept which became known as gastrodiplomacy. For this reason, an existing restaurant or a building with the appropriate infrastructure is usually rented and converted to operate the House of Switzerland. In the case of the 2016 Summer Olympics in Rio de Janeiro, a kind of resort was even built where the public could practice various sports disciplines, including ice skating.

==== More than just one house ====
If the sporting competition venues and the official host city are far apart, two Houses of Switzerland are established. This was the first time the case during the 2006 Winter Olympics in Turin, where a House of Switzerland was operated in Sestriere in addition to Turin. Another example is the 2010 Winter Olympics in Vancouver, where a second House of Switzerland was operated in Whistler. Due to the widely dispersed sports venues for the 2026 Winter Olympics in Italy, three representations of the House of Switzerland were even established: in Milan, Cortina d'Ampezzo and Bormio. However, the House of Switzerland in the Centro Svizzero in Milan was considered the main representation, as it was also the largest of the three.

=== Diplomacy takes over ===
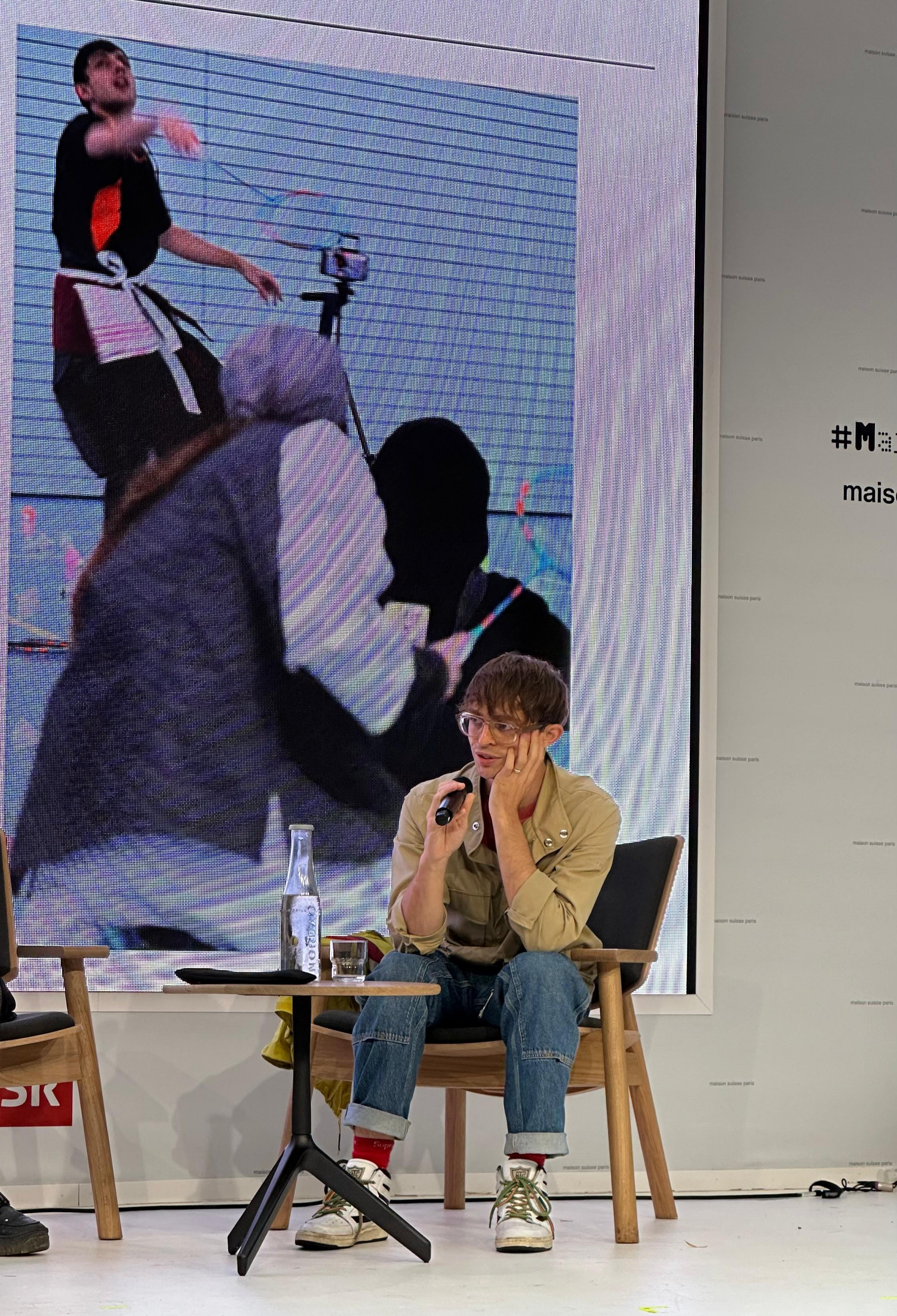
Thomas Liu Le Lann at the Maison Suisse Artist Talk on 5 September 2024, on the occasion of the Paralympic Games in Paris.

Over time, however, the House of Switzerland developed into a platform for Swiss public diplomacy, with a focus on sports and gastrodiplomacy. Due to this development, it was clear to the Swiss Olympic Association that it should place the organisation and operation of the House of Switzerland in the hands of the Federal Department of Foreign Affairs (FDFA).

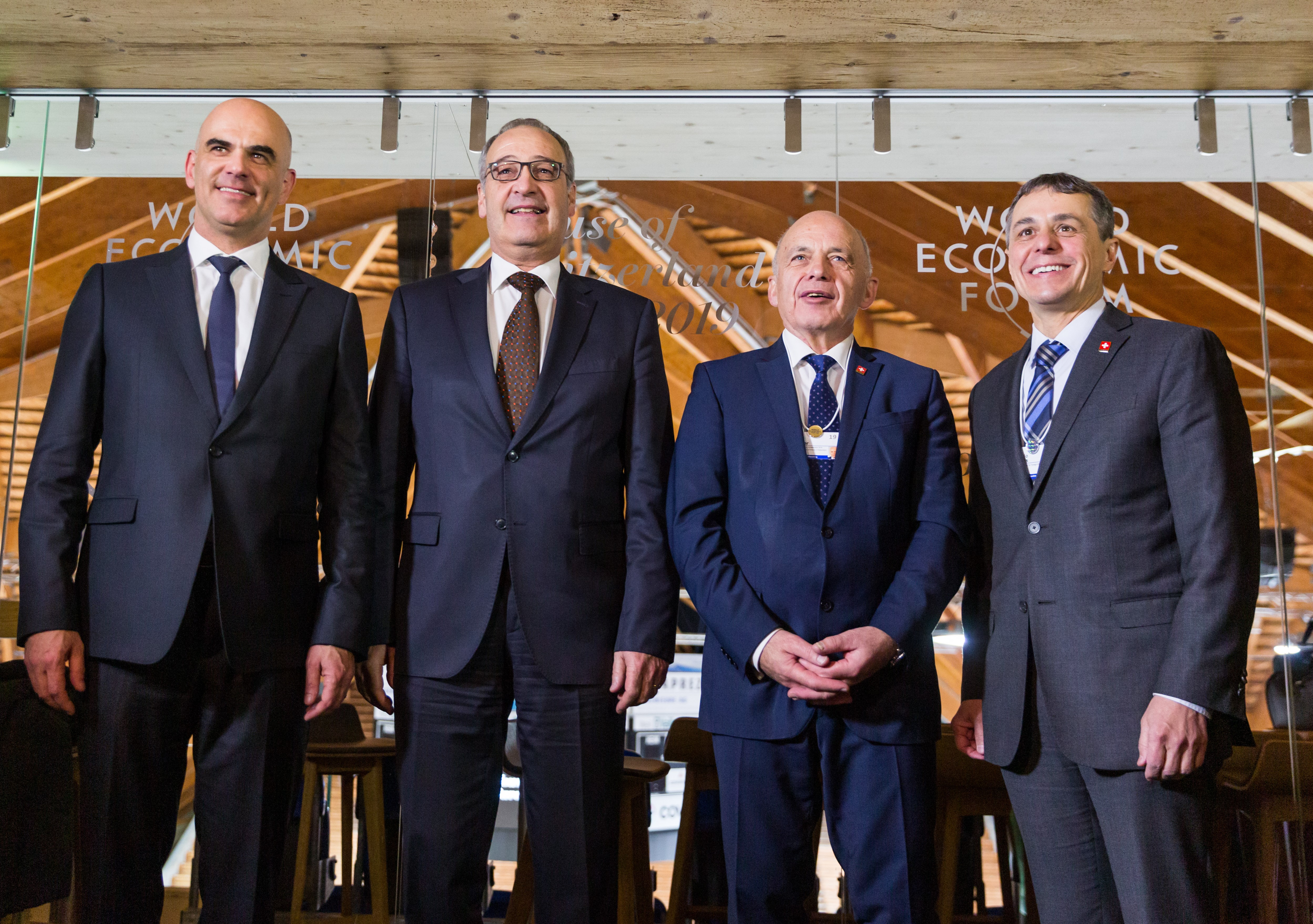
Left to right: The Federal Councillors Alain Berset, Guy Parmelin, Ueli Maurer, President of the Swiss Confederation, and Ignazio Cassis at the opening of the first House of Switzerland at the World Economic Forum (WEF) Annual Meeting in the Eisstadion Davos on 22 January 2019. This is the only House of Switzerland convened annually that has been established by a resolution of the Federal Council.

Since the 2004 Summer Olympics in Athens, the House of Switzerland has been under the project management of the Federal Department of Foreign Affairs (FDFA). Within the FDFA, Presence Switzerland (PRS) is responsible for the planning, implementation and execution of the concept for the House of Switzerland, which is based on a public–private partnership (PPP).

In addition to athletes, sports fans, the federal administration and further partners and sponsors, also the Swiss Broadcasting Corporation (SRG SSR) uses the House of Switzerland as its local headquarters. At the same time, the House of Switzerland serves as a marketing and event platform for the Swiss economy, tourism, culture and science. A corresponding supporting programme is part of the concept.

Over the years, there have been several Houses of Switzerland that have been in the spotlight due to their programmes, guests, location, architecture or special national significance. These include the Mobile House in Sochi in 2014, the House in the garden of the historic Hôtel de Besenval in Paris in 2024, called Maison Suisse, and the House at the World Economic Forum (WEF) Annual Meeting in Davos, which has been dedicated to international relations since 2019.

"The House of Switzerland is a good opportunity to present Switzerland with its values and qualities."

— Ueli Maurer, President of the Swiss Confederation, statement on the opening of the House of Switzerland in Davos on 22 January 2019, in the presence of the Landammann of Davos, Tarzisius Caviezel, and the Chief executive officer (CEO) of the HC Davos, Marc Gianola. It was these gentlemen who moved heaven and earth to bring the House of Switzerland at the Davos ice stadium to life

== Exceptional Houses of Switzerland ==
=== The French edition in the garden of the embassy: The Maison Suisse ===
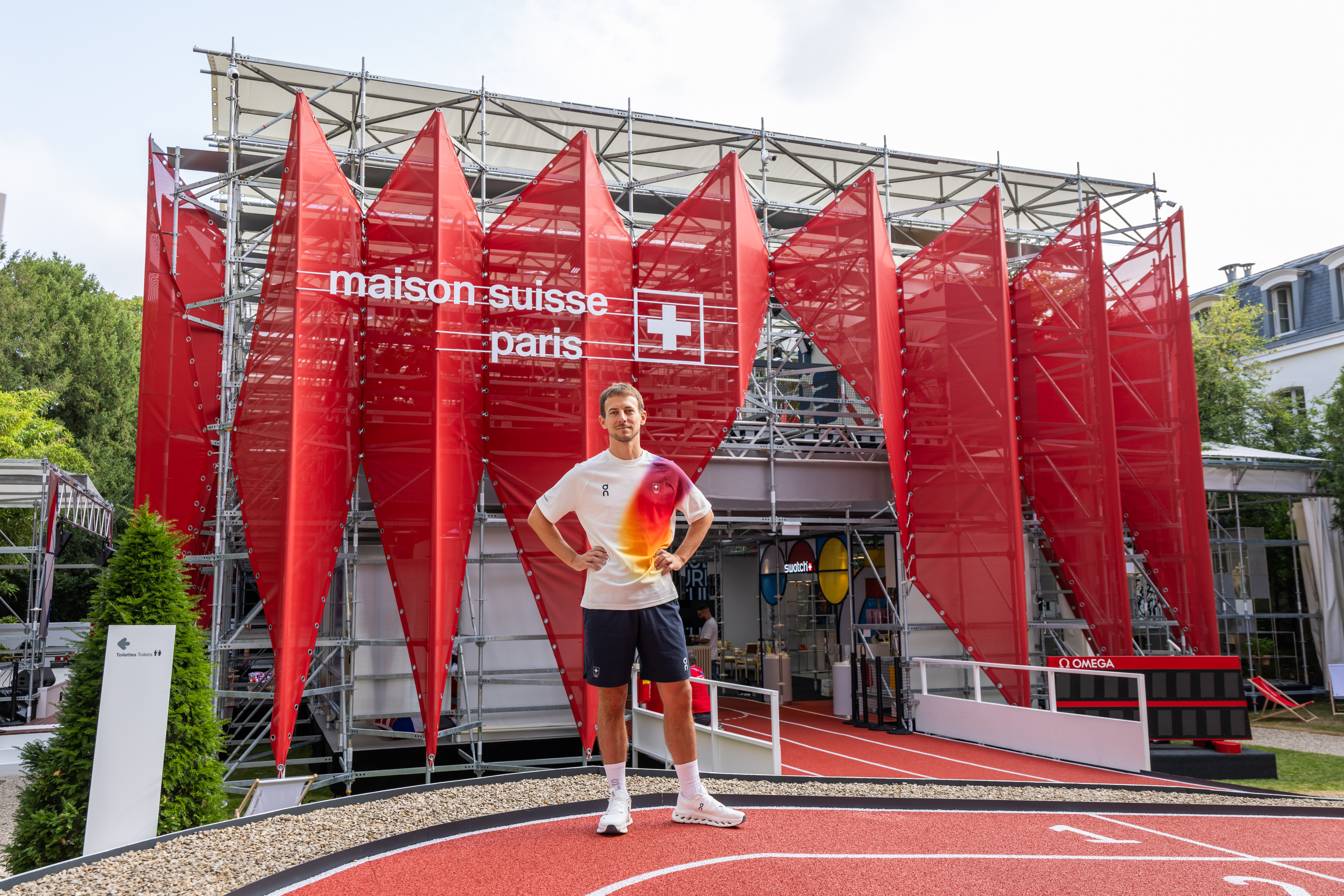
The House of Switzerland, called Maison Suisse, at the 2024 Summer Olympics and the 2024 Summer Paralympics in Paris in the garden of the Hôtel de Besenval. The head of the project was Philipp Ittig (FDFA).

For the 2024 Summer Olympics and the 2024 Summer Paralympics in Paris, a two-storey pavilion, called Maison Suisse – because French, the language of the host country, is also a Swiss national language – was erected in the garden of the Hôtel de Besenval, the seat of the Embassy of the Swiss Confederation since 1938. It was the first time that a House of Switzerland was built on the premises of an Embassy of the Swiss Confederation.

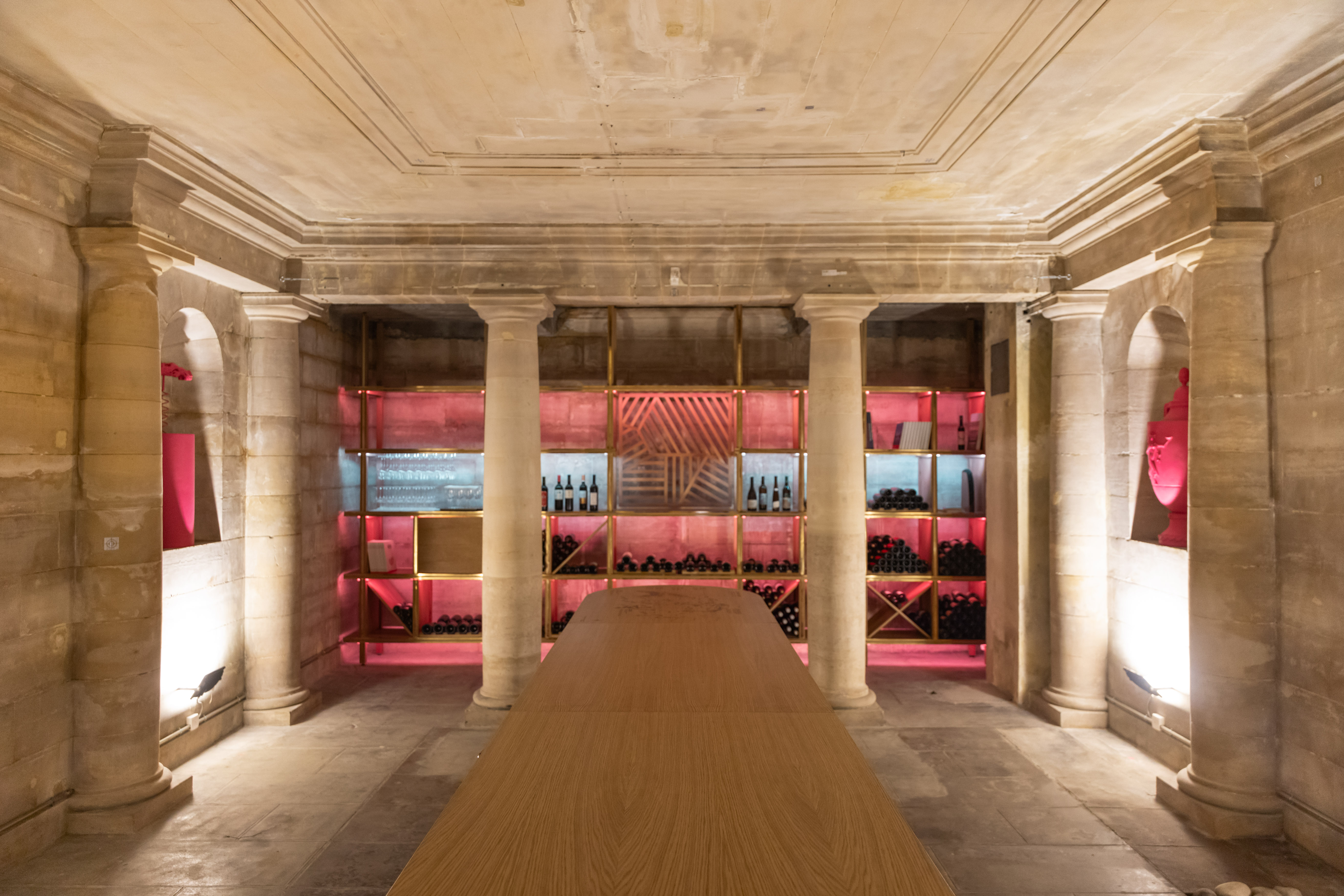
The nymphaeum, the Baron de Besenval's former private bath with an elliptical pool, at the Hôtel de Besenval after its renovation and transformation in 2024. The custom-made oak table seats 14 people.

The Maison Suisse had a total area of 1000 m^{2}, which included a bar, a restaurant, a VIP lounge and an Athletes lounge on the ground floor and an event space on the first floor. Furthermore, the programme included changing exhibitions, a cultural programme and art installations by the two Genevan artists Laure Marville (* 1990) and Thomas Liu Le Lann.

==== The Baron de Besenval's nymphaeum ====
The legendary nymphaeum of the illustrious Pierre Victor, Baron de Besenval de Brunstatt, in the basement of the Hôtel de Besenval was also part of the concept and served as an event space for top VIP events, hosted by Ambassador Roberto Balzaretti.

In 1782, the Baron de Besenval, a Swiss military officer in French service, had this private bath built by the architect Alexandre-Théodore Brongniart and decorated by the sculptor Claude Michel. Since its renovation and transformation in 2024, the nymphaeum has served as a wine cellar and event space. The Hôtel de Besenval is listed as a monument historique by decree of 20 October 1928, whereat the uniqueness of the nymphaeum is specifically mentioned.

=== The one-off project: The Mobile House of Switzerland ===
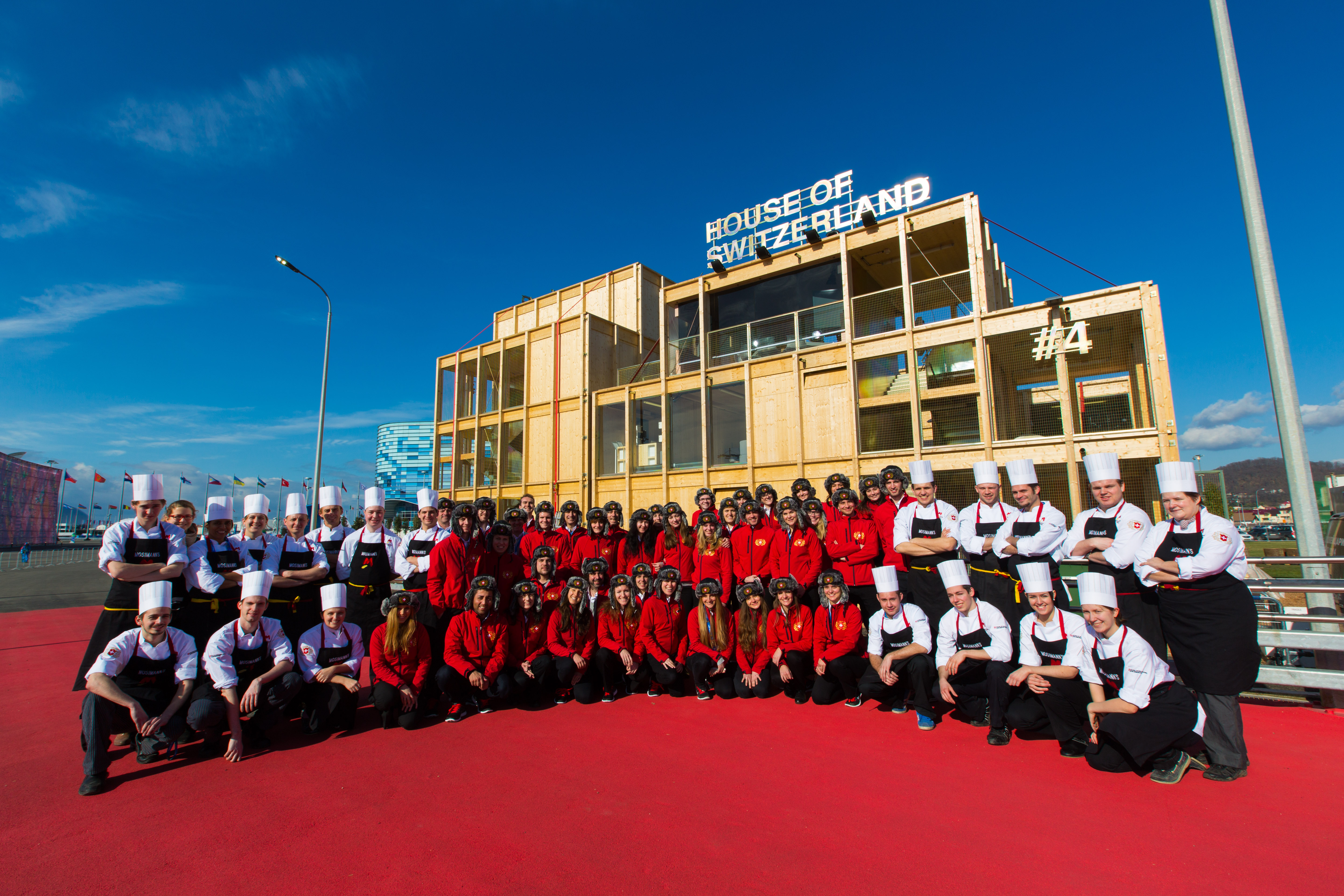
2014 Winter Olympics: The Mobile House of Switzerland and its team in Sochi.

Due to the fact that no ideal property could be found in the city of Sochi, a mobile House of Switzerland – manufactured in Switzerland in a classic-modern chalet style – was erected for the first time for the 2014 Winter Olympics. The spruce wood construction consists of 193 largely standardised elements that can be transported on fourteen semi-trailers or in containers. A further five trucks are needed to transport the interior fittings.

Both President Vladimir Putin and Foreign Minister Sergey Lavrov visited the House of Switzerland, where President Vladimir Putin met Federal Councillor Ueli Maurer on 14 February and Foreign Minister Sergey Lavrov met President Didier Burkhalter on 7 February.

==== A house consisting of four houses: Facts & figures ====
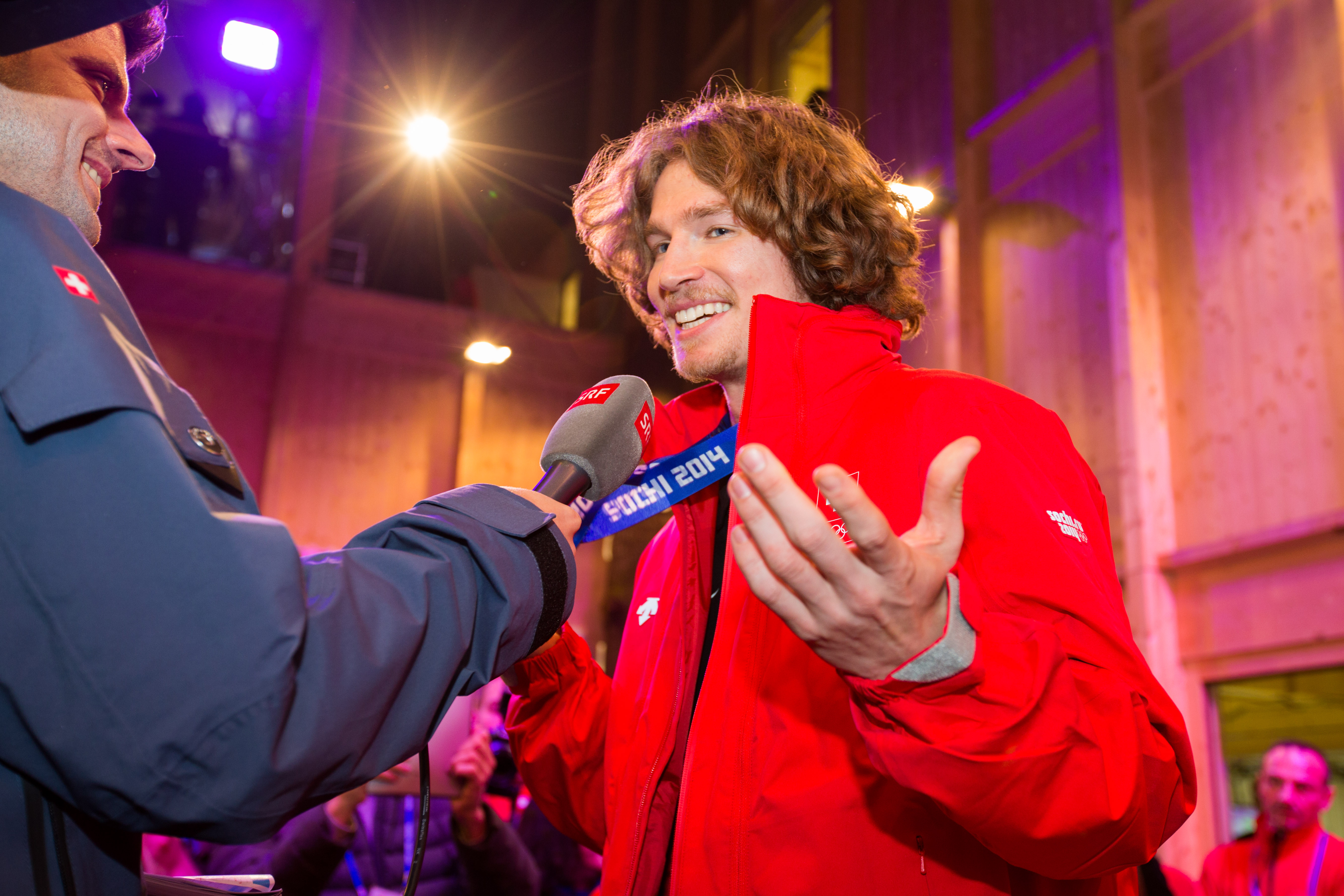
2014 Winter Olympics: Iouri Podladtchikov giving an interview whilst celebrating his gold medal at the Mobile House of Switzerland in Sochi.

The Mobile House of Switzerland was developed by Spillmann Echsle Architects from Zurich under the direction of Presence Switzerland, in collaboration with Timbatec – Timber and Technology GmbH and the general contractor Nüssli AG. Spillmann Echsle Architects was honoured with the German Design Award and the Best Architects Award for the project.

The concept is as follows: Four elements – also called houses, because they can also be used individually without the other elements – with two or three floors and a total area of 882 m^{2} are arranged in such a way that they form an inner courtyard of 66 m^{2}. The ground floor houses a restaurant, a kitchen with take-out, a stage and exhibition rooms. The VIP and Athletes' lounges and an office space are on the first floor. A further lounge, an open balcony and the studios and backrooms for television and radio are on the second floor. Although a third floor is visible from the outside of one of the building's elements, this isn't actually the case. The third floor visible from the outside is a double-height ceiling, providing space for the anchor studio of the Swiss Broadcasting Corporation (SRG SSR).

==== Sochi, Milan, Zurich and Interlaken ====
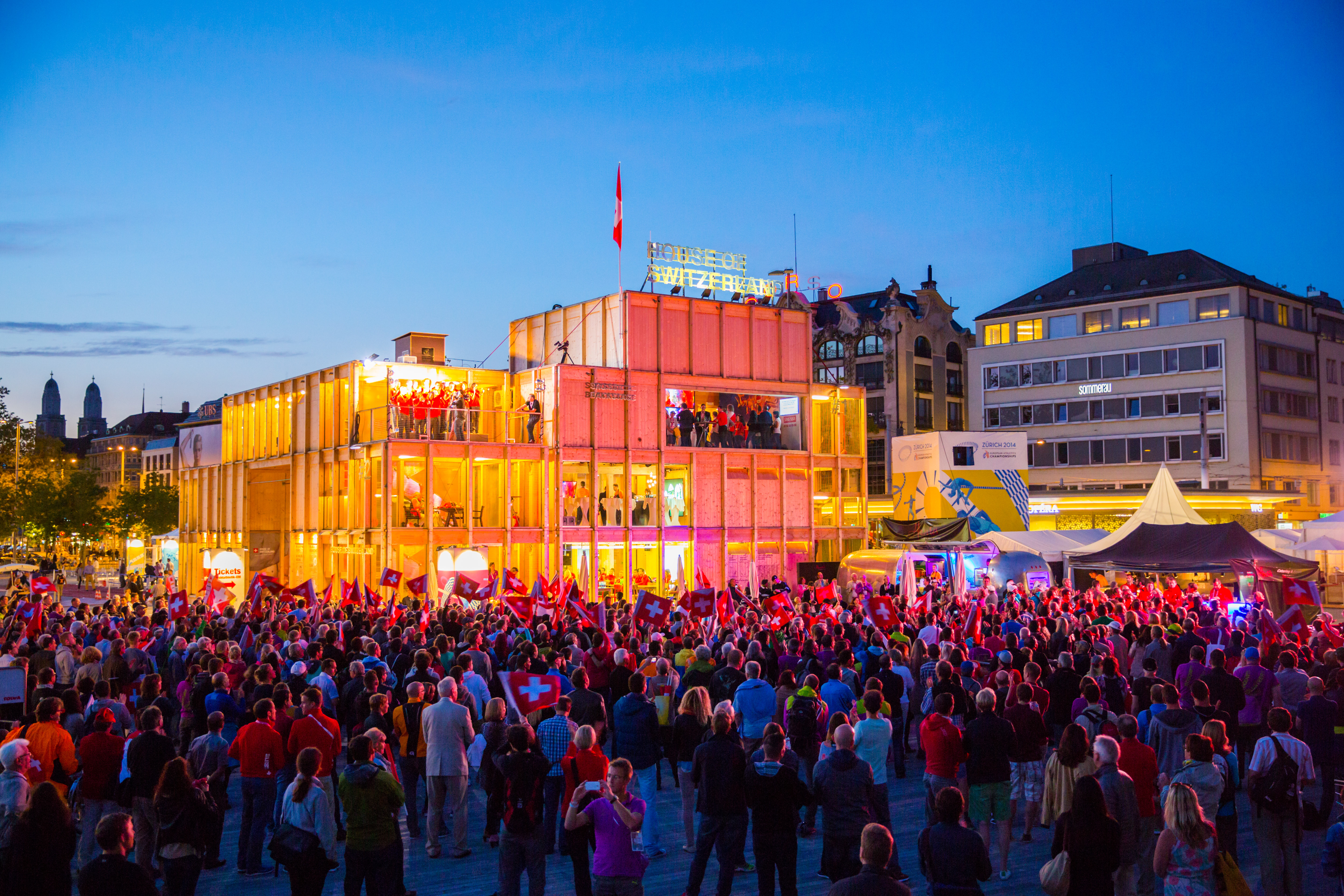
17 August 2014 – Zurich: The Mobile House of Switzerland during the 2014 European Athletics Championships. The open balcony on the second floor was very popular for medal celebrations in front of a large audience (next to the anchor studio of the Swiss Broadcasting Corporation (SRG SSR).)

After its first appearance in Sochi, the mobile building was used in a scaled-down version at the Giro del Gusto from 30 April to 11 May 2014 in Milan. In August 2014, it was used in full size on the Sechseläutenplatz in Zurich during the European Athletics Championships.

The Mobile House of Switzerland in Zurich was erected with the help of the Swiss Armed Forces, a feat of logistics. Due to its complexity, construction had to be carried out partly at night. Streets had to be closed, traffic diverted and tram overhead lines temporarily dismantled so that the heavy-duty vehicles carrying the construction elements could reach the Sechseläutenplatz.

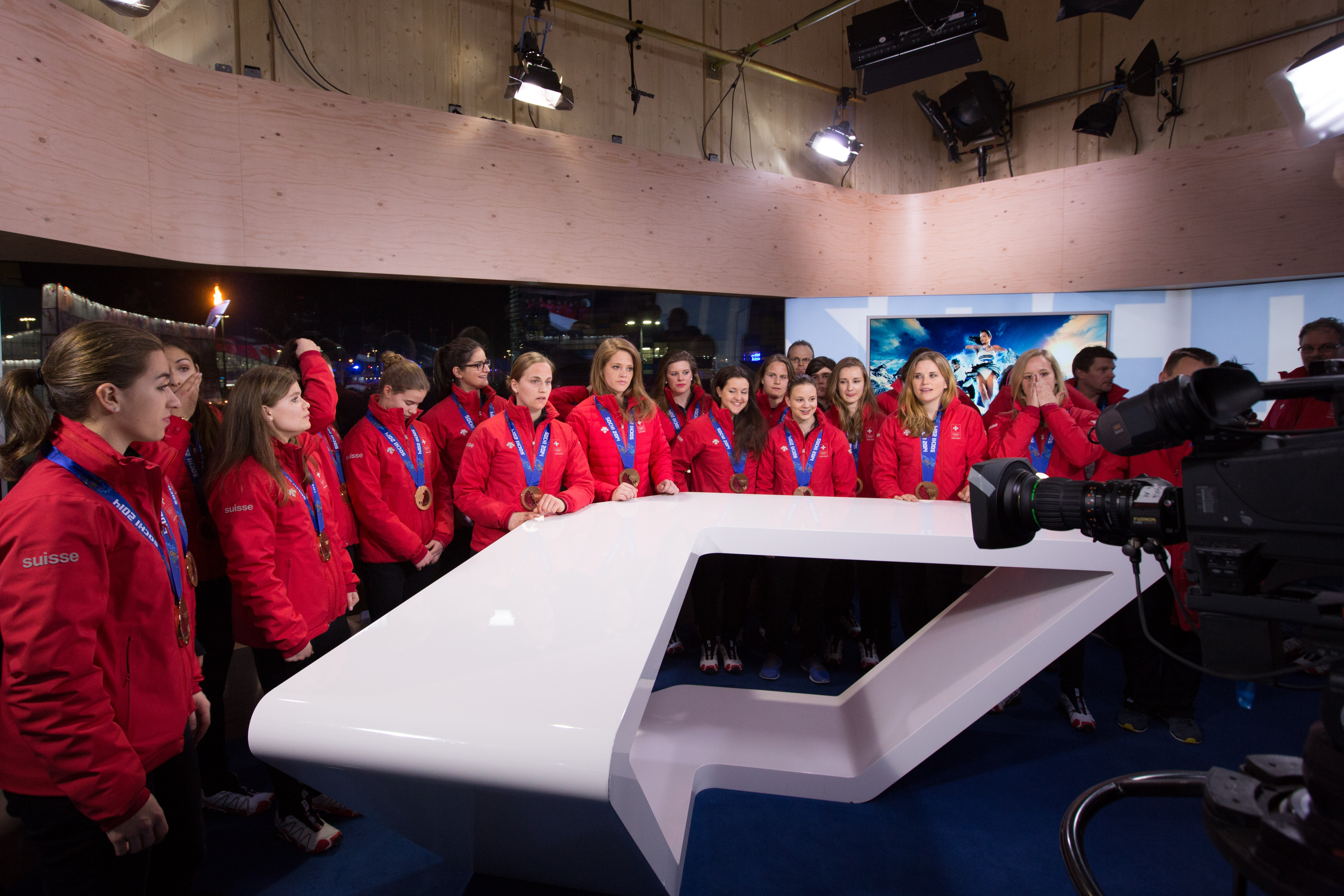
Switzerland women's national ice hockey team in the studio of the SRG SSR at the Mobile House of Switzerland in Sochi, after winning the bronze medal at the 2014 Winter Olympics. The double-height ceiling is clearly visible.

At the end of the European Athletics Championships in Zurich, a public reception for the Swiss athletes was held in front of the Mobile House of Switzerland on 17 August 2014. Thousands of fans celebrated the athletes as they appeared on the open balcony.

After the Mobile House of Switzerland had been stored in a warehouse on the site of the former Swiss Air Force airfield in Mollis for many years, it was decided in 2024 – under the leadership of the Federal Office for Buildings and Logistics (FOBL) – that the building would be permanently installed on the grounds of the Interlaken Air Base. The implementation of this plan took around one year, with ensuring the structural stability of this once temporary building posing a particular challenge. In mid-April 2026, the work to reconstruct the Mobile House of Switzerland was completed. The locally based firms von Allmen Architekten and Gerber + Troxler Bau AG were responsible for the planning and implementation of the permanent installation of the building. The Mobile House of Switzerland serves as a federal training facility, primarily for the Swiss Armed Forces and the Federal Office for Customs and Border Security (FOCBS), as well as an event venue.

=== The exception: The House of Switzerland at the World Economic Forum Annual Meeting in Davos ===
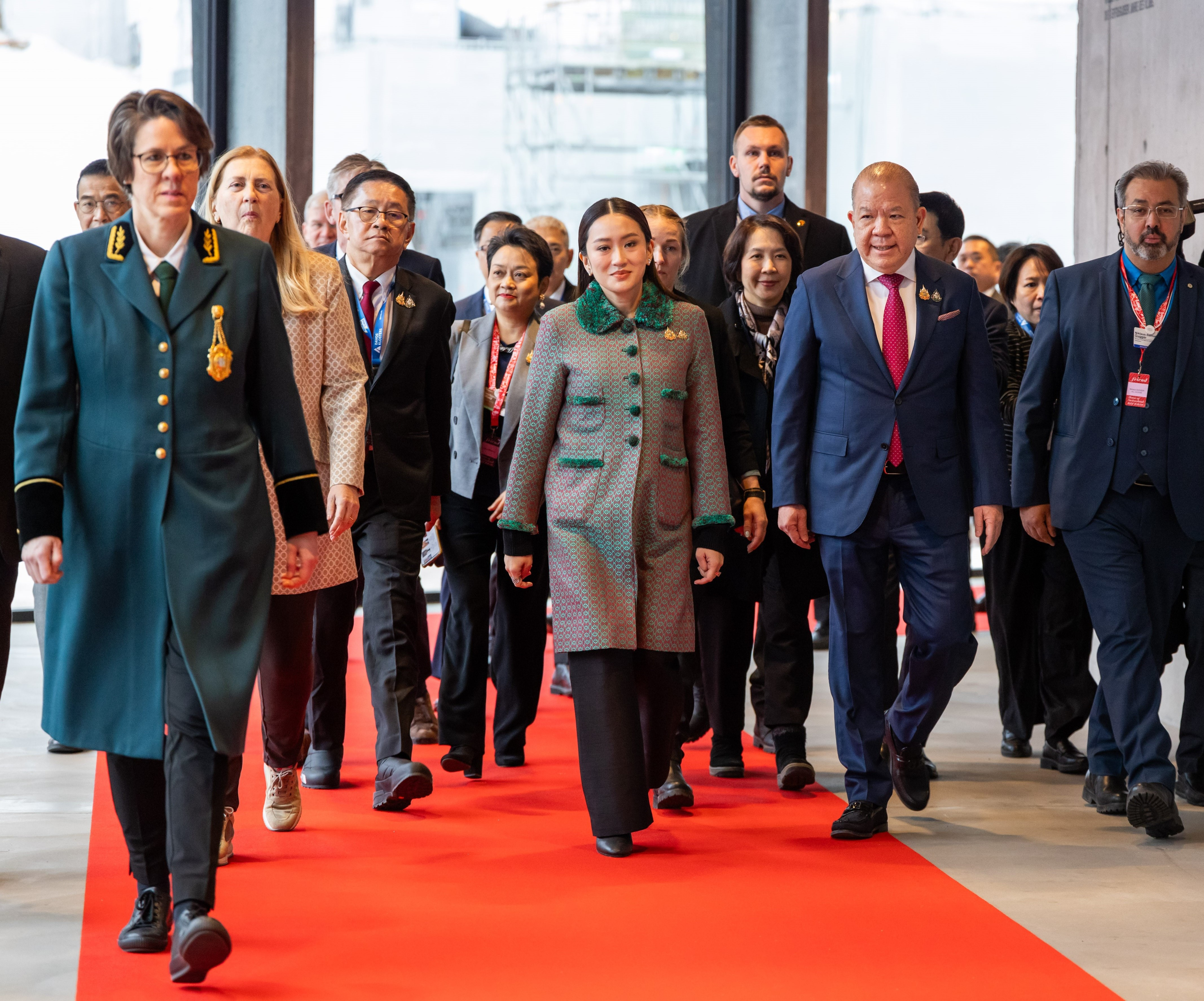
23 January 2025 – House of Switzerland, Davos: The Federal Huissier (far left in uniform) escorts the Swiss–Thai delegation to the meeting with Federal Councillor Guy Parmelin for the signing ceremony of the Free Trade Agreement between Switzerland and the other members of the European Free Trade Association (EFTA) with the Kingdom of Thailand. The Thai delegation is headed by the Prime Minister, Paetongtarn Shinawatra. The Prime Minister is flanked by members of the Thai Cabinet, such as the Deputy Prime Minister and Minister of Digital Economy and Society, Prasert Jantararuangtong, the Minister of Foreign Affairs, Maris Sangiampongsa, the Minister of Commerce, Pichai Naripthaphan, as well as Swiss and Thai diplomats and members of parliament, including Ambassador Pimchanok Pitfield, State Secretary Helene Budliger Artieda, Ambassador Markus Schlagenhof and National Councillor Nik Gugger.

At its meeting on 14 June 2019, the Swiss Federal Council decided to continue and institutionalise the House of Switzerland at the World Economic Forum (WEF) Annual Meeting in Davos, which was first operated at the WEF Annual Meeting in January 2019 and has since been entirely dedicated to international relations. This is the only House of Switzerland convened annually, formally established by a resolution of the Federal Council, directly linked to government business and consistently set up and operated at the same location each year, with its premises in the Eisstadion Davos.

==== Cooperation between the federal authorities, the cantons and the municipality of Davos ====
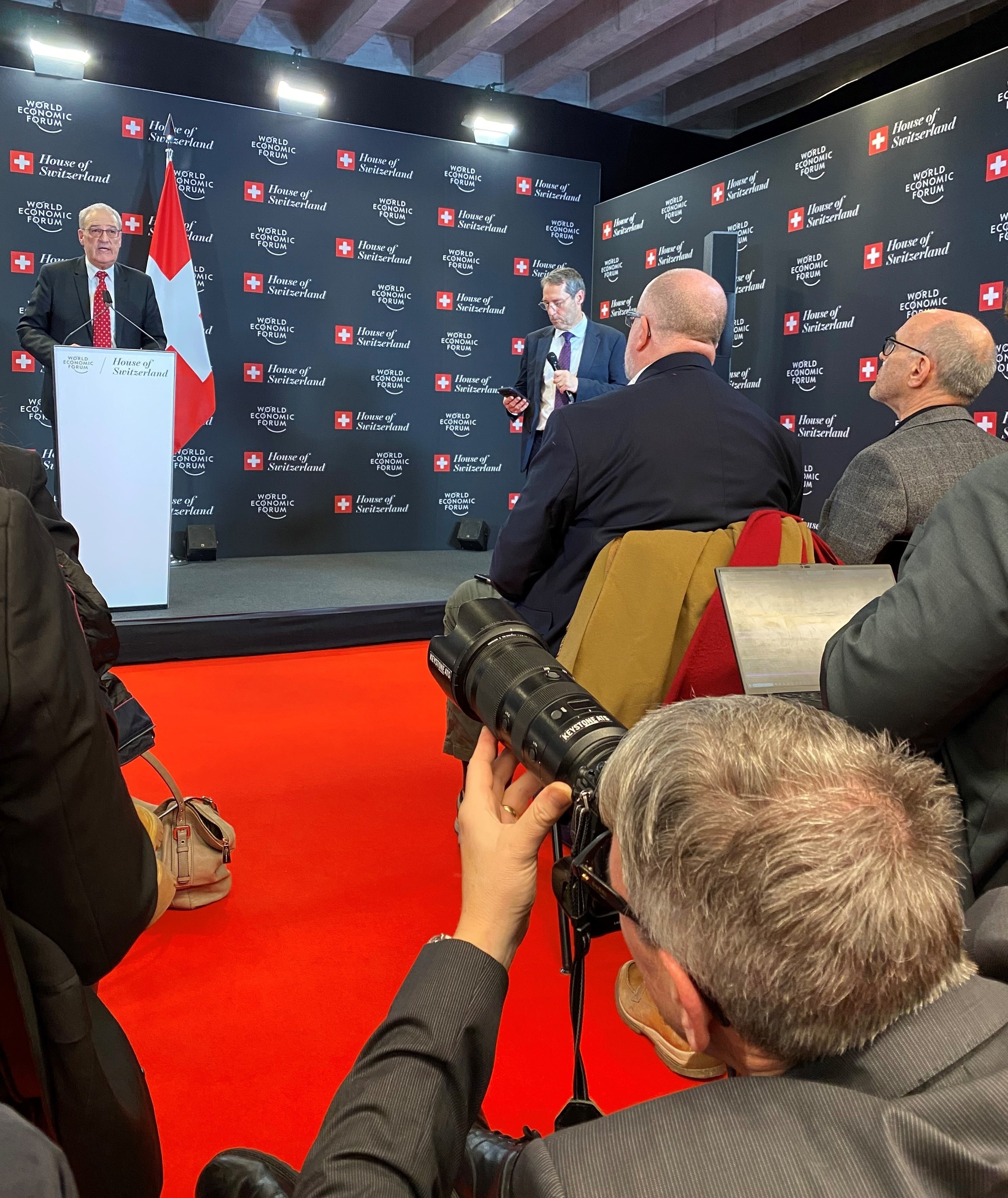
21 January 2026 – House of Switzerland, Davos: "That's diplomacy," Guy Parmelin, President of the Swiss Confederation, at his press conference, following the meeting with Donald Trump, President of the United States. Standing on the far right: Urs Wiedmer, the head of communications for the Federal Department of Economic Affairs, Education and Research.

The House of Switzerland in Davos serves as a communication and networking platform for the official Swiss delegation, consisting of the members of the Swiss Federal Council, the state secretaries, the heads of the federal offices and other high-ranking diplomats and officials as well as members of parliament.

Like all official Houses of Switzerland, the House of Switzerland in Davos is operated by Presence Switzerland (PRS), with support from the municipality of Davos, the Federal Office for Buildings and Logistics (FOBL), the Federal Office of Police (Fedpol), the Federal Intelligence Service (FIS), the cantonal police of the Canton of the Grisons (Kapo GR) – as well as other cantonal police forces –, the Swiss Military Police (MP) and the Swiss Armed Forces in general. The head of the project is Dieter A. Borer (FDFA), who concurrently serves as the Chief of Protocol at the House of Switzerland in Davos.

As at the Federal Palace of Switzerland in Bern, responsibility for security at the House of Switzerland in Davos is shared among several services, although members of the Federal Police are the only personnel in uniform stationed in front of and inside the entrance areas.

"That's diplomacy."

— Guy Parmelin, President of the Swiss Confederation, statement at his press conference at the House of Switzerland on 21 January 2026. Parmelin was asked by a Swiss journalist about a possible lack of backbone on the part of the Swiss government in connection with his greeting to Donald Trump, President of the United States. Earlier that day, speaking on camera, Parmelin welcomed Trump to the WEF Annual Meeting in Davos by saying, "Davos without you, it's not truly Davos," to which Trump replied with a smile, "I agree," prompting smiles among those present

==== Alpine Diplomacy: The official House of the Government of Switzerland ====
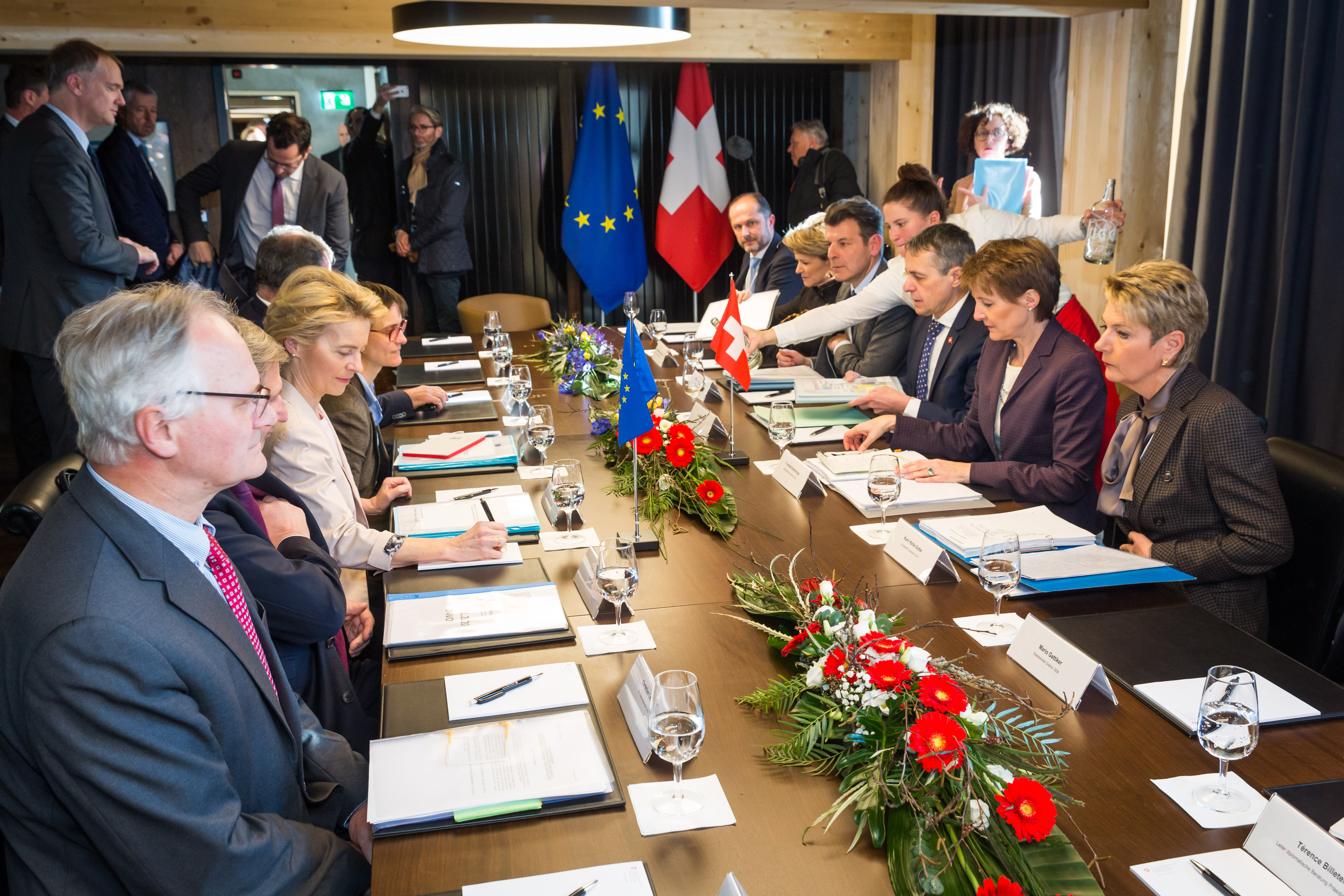
20 January 2020 – House of Switzerland, Davos: The President of the Swiss Confederation, Simonetta Sommaruga, and the Federal Councillors Karin Keller-Sutter and Ignazio Cassis as well as the State Secretaries Roberto Balzaretti, Mario Gattiker and Marie-Gabrielle Ineichen-Fleisch and the Director of the Federal Office of Energy, Benoît Revaz, meet the delegation of the President of the European Commission, Ursula von der Leyen, for talks on bilateral relations between Switzerland and the European Union.

During the WEF Annual Meeting in Davos, the House of Switzerland serves as the official seat of the Swiss Federal Council, as most Federal Councillors are in Davos at this time. Accordingly, the House of Switzerland is popularly referred to as the Federal Palace of Davos or Chalet Fédéral. It is here where the Federal Councillors, the state secretaries, the Chairman of the Governing Board of the Swiss National Bank (SNB) as well as the President of the National Council and the President of the Council of States and other representatives of the Swiss Confederation receive their guests.

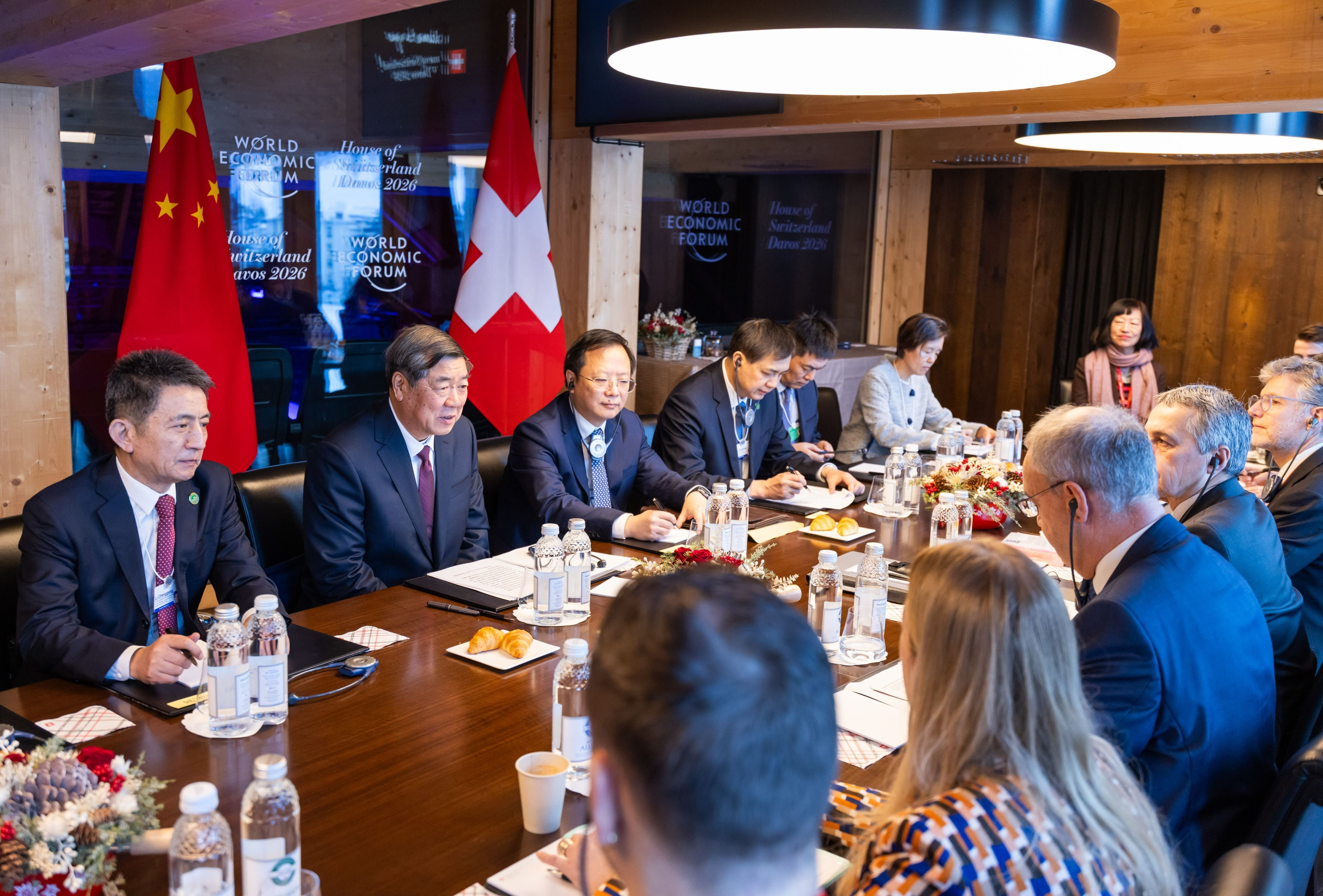
20 January 2026 – House of Switzerland, Davos: Guy Parmelin, President of the Swiss Confederation, Federal Councillor Ignazio Cassis and State Secretary Helene Budliger Artieda welcome He Lifeng, Vice Premier of China, and his delegation, including Li Chenggang, Vice Minister of Commerce, for talks on bilateral relations.

The House of Switzerland provides prestigious meeting rooms primarily available to members of the Government of the Swiss Confederation for bilateral meetings, international video conferences, business lunches and dinners, press conferences and signing ceremonies, such as those marking the Free Trade Agreements between Switzerland and the other members of the European Free Trade Association (EFTA) with Kosovo on 22 January 2025 and with the Kingdom of Thailand on 23 January 2025. The high-ranking Thai delegation comprised over 80 people.

Furthermore, following the conclusion of negotiations at the House of Switzerland in Davos, the Free Trade Agreements between the EFTA members and India, Malaysia and the Mercosur states were signed on 10 March 2025 in Delhi, on 23 June 2025 in Tromsø (on the occasion of the EFTA Ministerial Conference) and on 16 September 2025 in Rio de Janeiro, respectively.

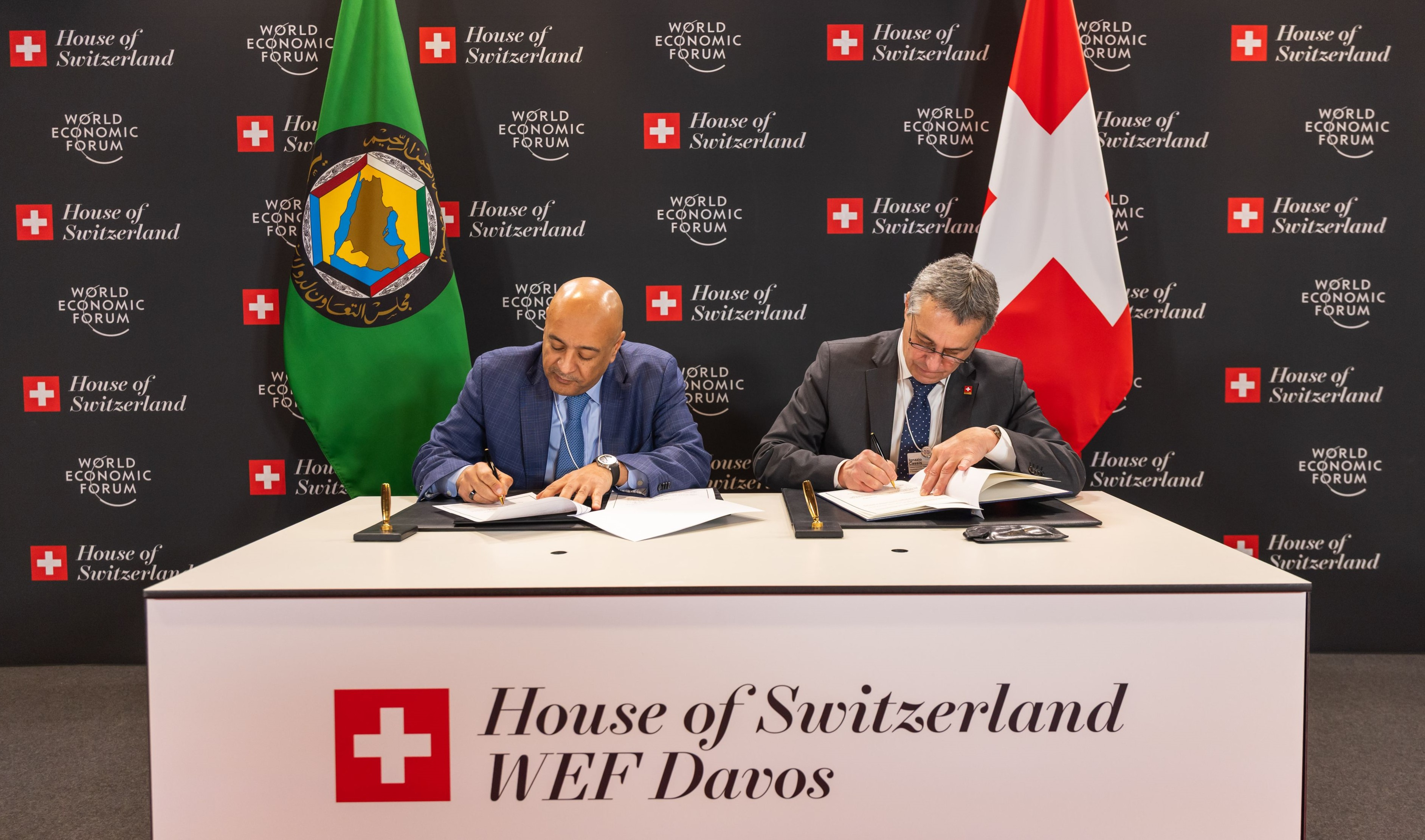
20 January 2026 – House of Switzerland, Davos: Jasem Mohamed Al Budaiwi, Secretary General of the Gulf Cooperation Council (GCC), and Federal Councillor Ignazio Cassis sign the Memorandum of Understanding (MoU).

On 20 January 2026, Jasem Mohamed Al Budaiwi, Secretary General of the Gulf Cooperation Council (GCC), and Federal Councillor Ignazio Cassis signed a Memorandum of Understanding (MoU) to establish a strategic dialogue between the GCC and the Swiss Confederation at the House of Switzerland. As a memento, Jasem Mohamed Al Budaiwi presented the flag of the GCC, which had been used for the signing ceremony, to the Swiss Confederation.

"The meetings at the WEF Annual Meeting in Davos are about contacts and dialogue. I met representatives of the Republic of Moldova, the Presidents of Colombia and Costa Rica, the Prime Ministers of Georgia, the Netherlands and Tunisia as well as the Chancellor of Germany. Furthermore, I shared a raclette with the Prime Minister of Luxembourg."

— Alain Berset, President of the Swiss Confederation, statement at his press conference at the House of Switzerland on 20 January 2023 on the uniqueness of the WEF Annual Meeting platform in Davos and the associated networking opportunities

==== In the service of Public Diplomacy ====
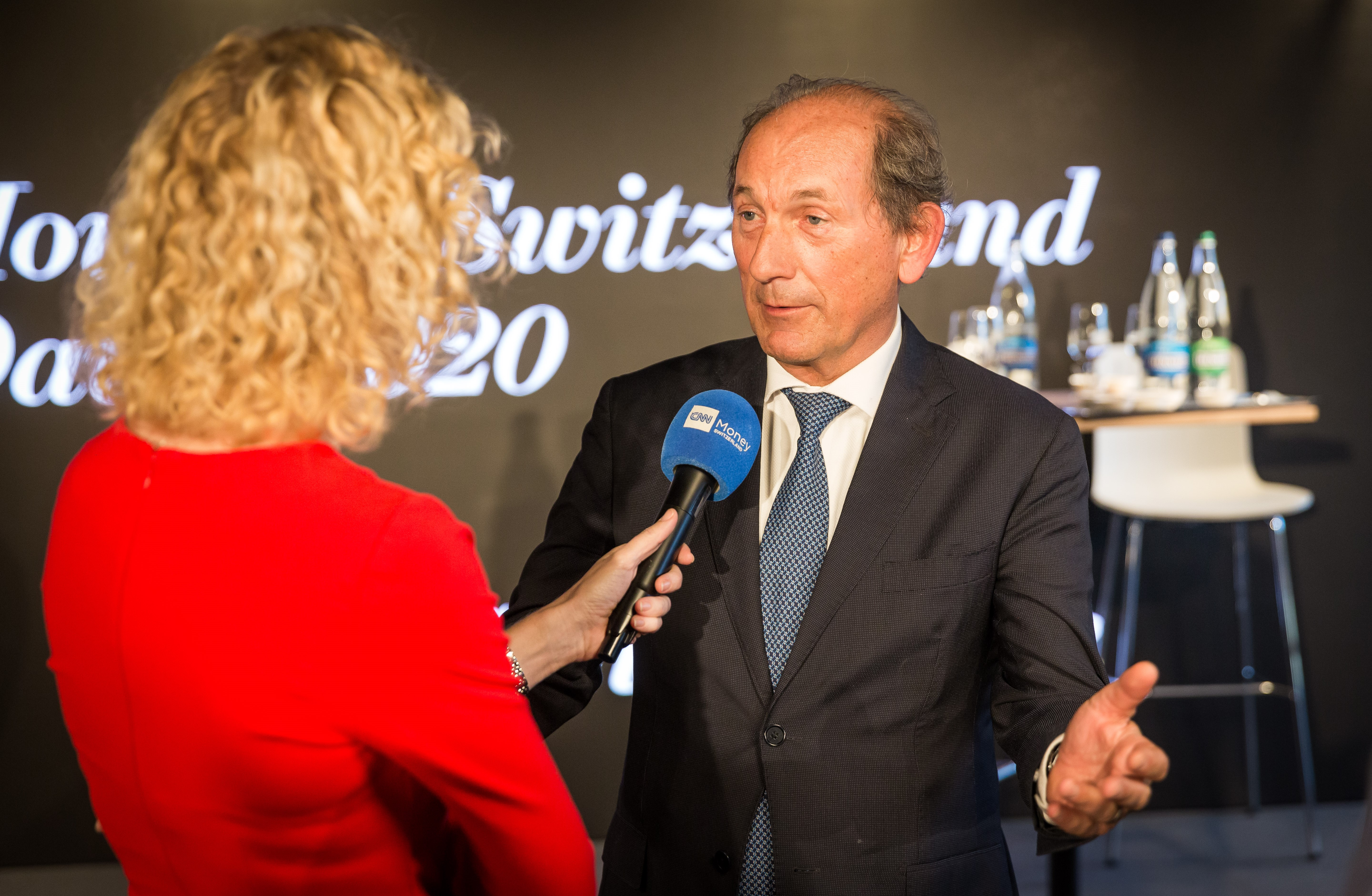
23 January 2020 – House of Switzerland, Davos: Paul Bulcke, Chairman of the Board of Directors of Nestlé from 2017 to 2025, giving an interview to CNNMoney on the launch of the initiative: Swiss Food and Nutrition Valley.

The House of Switzerland in Davos also has event spaces, which the federal administration uses together with external partners to organise public events in the fields of science, business and politics. Accordingly, other federal agencies such as the State Secretariat for Economic Affairs (Seco), the State Secretariat for International Finance (SIF), the State Secretariat for Security Policy (SEPOS) and the State Secretariat for Education, Research and Innovation (SERI) as well as federal-related organisations and institutions such as Switzerland Global Enterprise (S-GE), the École Polytechnique Fédérale de Lausanne (EPFL) and the ETH Zürich (ETHZ) also use the House of Switzerland in Davos. It is also fitting that – as has long been the practice at the Olympic Games – the Swiss Broadcasting Corporation (SRG SSR) has had its studio space in the House of Switzerland since 2025.

"The WEF Annual Meeting in Davos is the premier platform for economic policy. There's no better place to focus on one's interests."

— Ambassador Nicolas Bideau (* 1969), Director of Presence Switzerland (2011–2024), on the importance of the House of Switzerland at the WEF Annual Meeting in Davos

==== In the service of the Good Offices ====
As part of the fourth meeting of the National Security Advisers (NSA), held on 14 January 2024 and, for the first time, in the run-up to the WEF Annual Meeting in Davos, the House of Switzerland served as a venue for more than 80 delegations from around the world alongside the Davos Congress Centre.
