= Li Chenggang =

Chinese diplomat

- 李成钢
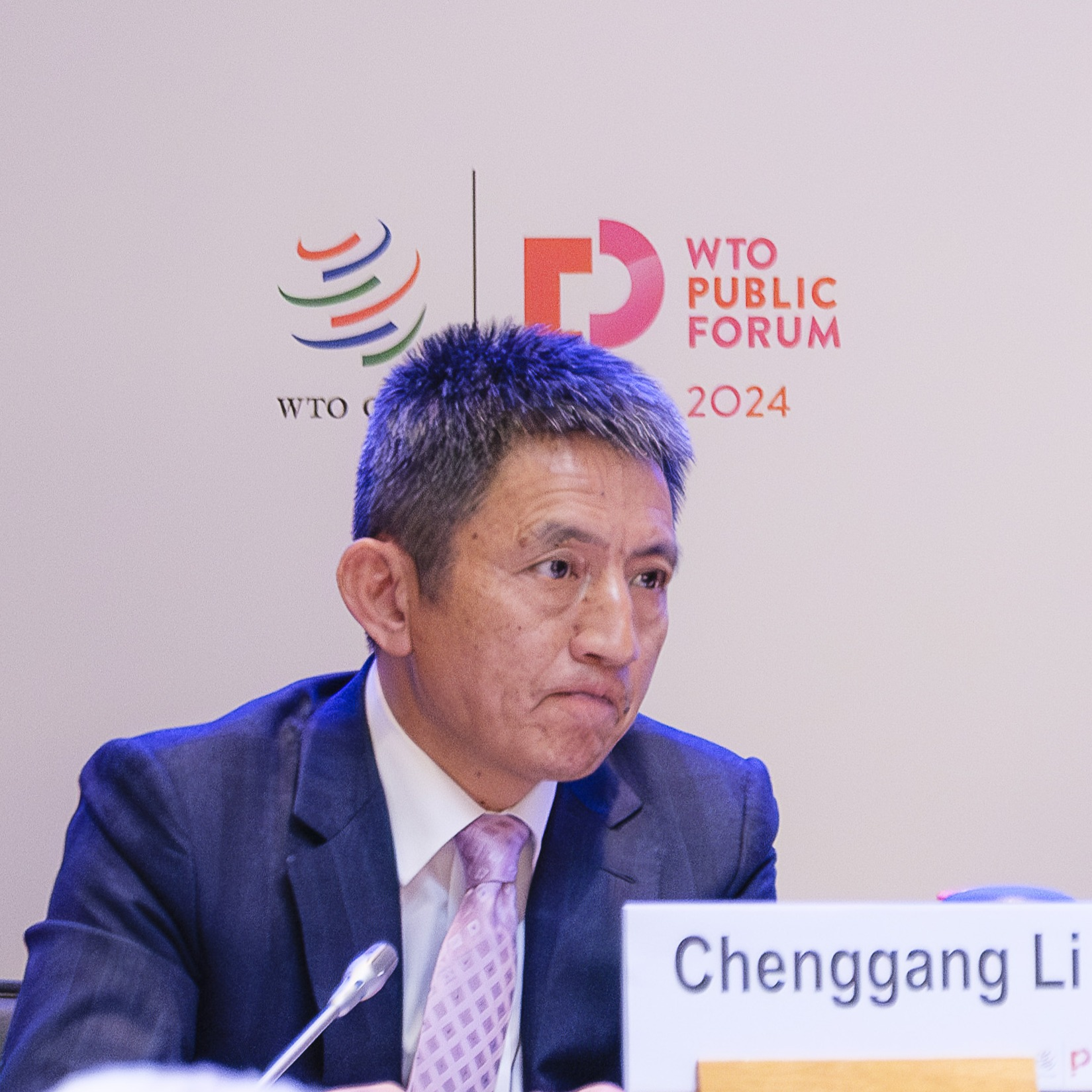
- Chenggang in 2024

China International Trade Representative
- Incumbent
- Assumed office 20 September 2026
- Premier: Li Qiang

China International Trade Representative at the Ministry of Commerce of China
- In office 16 April 2025 – 20 September 2026
- Premier: Li Qiang
- Commerce Minister: Wang Wentao
- Preceded by: Wang Shouwen

Permanent Representative and Ambassador of China to the World Trade Organization and Deputy Permanent Representative of China to the United Nations Office at Geneva
- In office 4 February 2021 – 20 October 2025
- Premier: Li Keqiang; Li Qiang
- Preceded by: Zhang Xiangchen
- Succeeded by: Li Yongjie

Assistant Minister of Commerce of China
- In office December 2016 – January 2021

Personal details
- Born: February 1967 (age 59) Taihu County, Anhui, China
- Party: Chinese Communist Party
- Education: Peking University (LLB); University of Hamburg (LLM)

Li Chenggang (Chinese: 李成钢; born February 1967) is a Chinese politician and diplomat, currently serving as the China International Trade Representative with Full Ministerial Rank since September 2026. He served as Permanent Representative and Ambassador of China to the World Trade Organization and Deputy Permanent Representative of China to the United Nations Office at Geneva from February 2021 to October 2025.

== Early life and education ==
Li was born in February 1967 in Taihu County, Anhui, China. He was admitted to the Peking University Law School in 1985 and joined the Chinese Communist Party in December 1988. In July 1989, he graduated with a Bachelor of Laws degree. In 1995, he went to Hong Kong as a visiting scholar at the University of Hong Kong to study the legal conflicts between the mainland and Hong Kong. From 1998 to 1999, he received a full scholarship from the European Master in Law and Economics (EMLE) program to study at the University of Hamburg in Germany and received a Master of Laws degree.

== Career ==
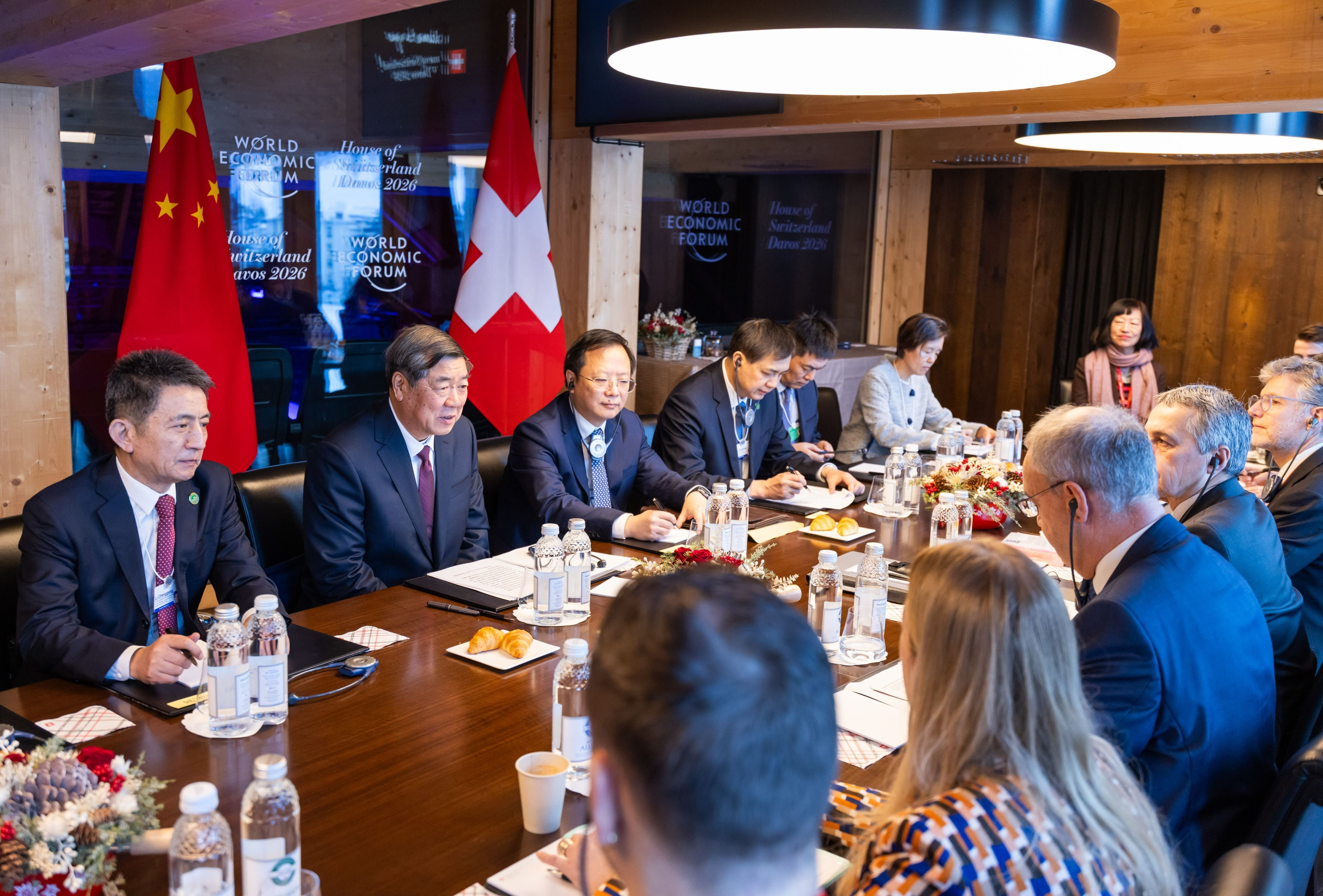
20 January 2026 – House of Switzerland at the World Economic Forum (WEF) Annual Meeting in Davos: Guy Parmelin, President of the Swiss Confederation, Federal Councillor Ignazio Cassis and State Secretary Helene Budliger Artieda welcome He Lifeng, Vice Premier of China, and Li Chenggang for talks on bilateral relations.

Li began his career in 1989 at the Ministry of Foreign Trade and Economic Cooperation, focusing on trade law and anti-dumping investigations. He later joined the Ministry of Commerce, where he held various roles in fair trade and legal affairs.

From 2004 to 2010, he served as deputy director of the Fair Trade Bureau for Imports and Exports and then as Deputy Director-General of the Treaty and Law Department. Between 2010 and 2017, he was Director-General of the Treaty and Law Department, with a one-year secondment as Vice Mayor of Qingdao from 2013 to 2014. From 2017 to 2021, he served as Assistant Minister of Commerce.

On 4 February 2021 Li began serving as China's Permanent Representative and Ambassador Extraordinary and Plenipotentiary to the World Trade Organization, as well as Deputy Permanent Representative of China to the United Nations Office at Geneva. On 16 April 2025, as part of China's response to tariffs imposed on it by the second presidency of Donald Trump, the State Council of China appointed Li as the China International Trade Representative (Full Ministerial Rank) and as Vice Minister Commerce of China, replacing Wang Shouwen. On 20 October 2025, it was announced that Li was removed from his WTO post. The news came after United States Treasury Secretary Scott Bessent publicly called Chenggang "disrespectful," "unhinged" and a "rogue negotiator" at a press conference, characterizations which were disputed by the Chinese Commerce Ministry. Li nevertheless continued to hold the title of International Trade Representative, meeting Bessent again in subsequent negotiations.

== Works ==
- Li Chenggang (2011). WTO Rules of the Game: China's Participation in the WTO Dispute Settlement Years of Legal Practice (1st ed.). Commercial Press. ISBN 978-7100086912.
- Li Chenggang Zhang Yuqing (2001). WTO and Safeguards Disputes (1st ed.). Shanghai: People's Publishing House. ISBN 7208038910.

Government offices
Preceded by Wang Shouwen	International Trade Negotiation Representative of the Ministry of Commerce; 2025-present	Incumbent
Diplomatic posts
Preceded by Zhang Xianchen (张向晨)	Permanent Representative of China to the World Trade Organization; 2021-2025	Succeeded by Li Yongjie (李詠箑)
