= Presence Switzerland =

Coordinates: 46.9462°N 7.4387°E

- (in German) Präsenz Schweiz (in French) Présence Suisse (in Italian) Presenza Svizzera (in Romansh) Preschientscha Svizra

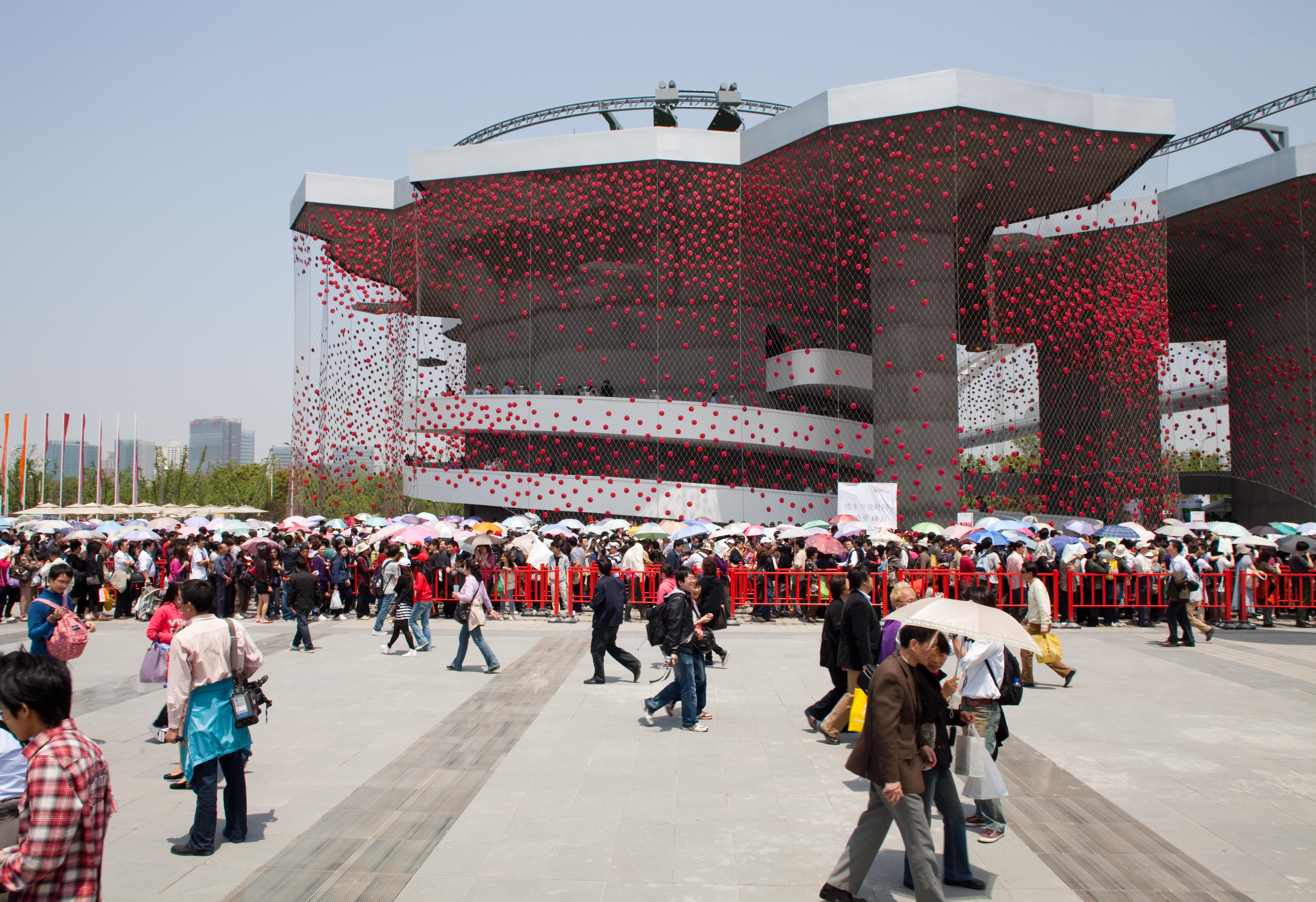
- The Swiss pavilion at the Expo 2010 is a project of Presence Switzerland.

Agency overview
- Jurisdiction: Federal administration of Switzerland
- Headquarters: Bern, Switzerland
- Minister responsible: Ignazio Cassis, Federal Councillor
- Parent agency: Federal Department of Foreign Affairs
- Website: www.dfae.admin.ch

Presence Switzerland (German: Präsenz Schweiz; French: Présence Suisse) is an official Swiss organisation and part of the Federal Department of Foreign Affairs. According to its official website, it aims to improve the perception of Switzerland abroad through public outreach. It was formally constituted on November 20, 2000 as the successor organization of the Coordinating Commission for the Presence of Switzerland Abroad.

The organisation's name is not to be confused with Switzerland Tourism, the owner of the MySwitzerland website.

Presence Switzerland manages an eight-language information website about the country, describing its history, institutions and politics. It also hosts the Swiss pavilions at the World's fairs, as well as the House of Switzerland.

== See also ==
- Pro Helvetia
- Swissinfo
