= Helene Budliger Artieda =

Swiss diplomat

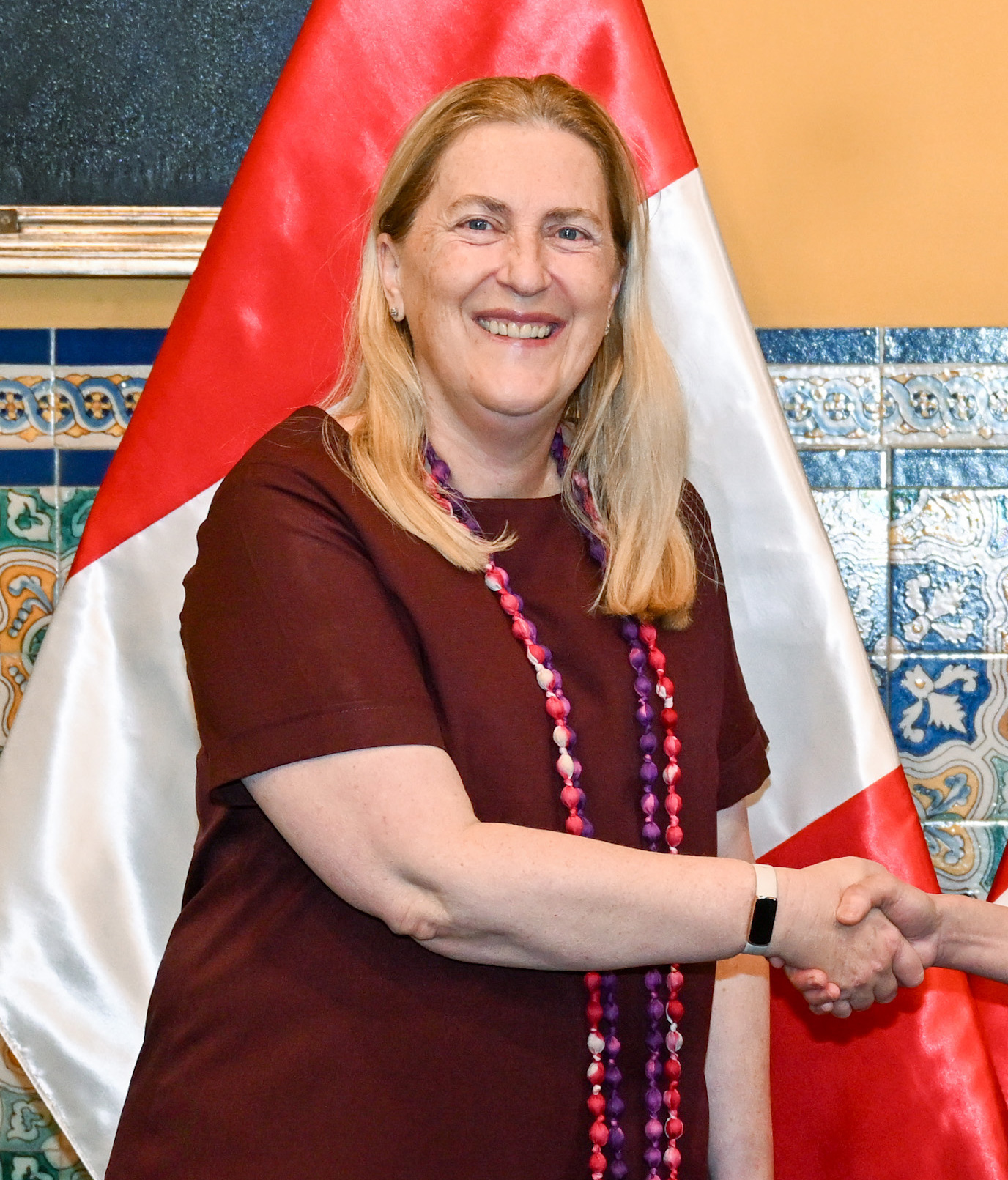
Helene Budliger Artieda (2023)

Helene Budliger Artieda (* 1965 in Zurich) is a Swiss diplomat and Director of the State Secretariat for Economic Affairs (SECO) as State Secretary since August 2022. She is a former director of resources at the Federal Department of Foreign Affairs and was ambassador to Thailand, Cambodia and Laos, based in Bangkok, from 2019 to 2022.

== Career ==
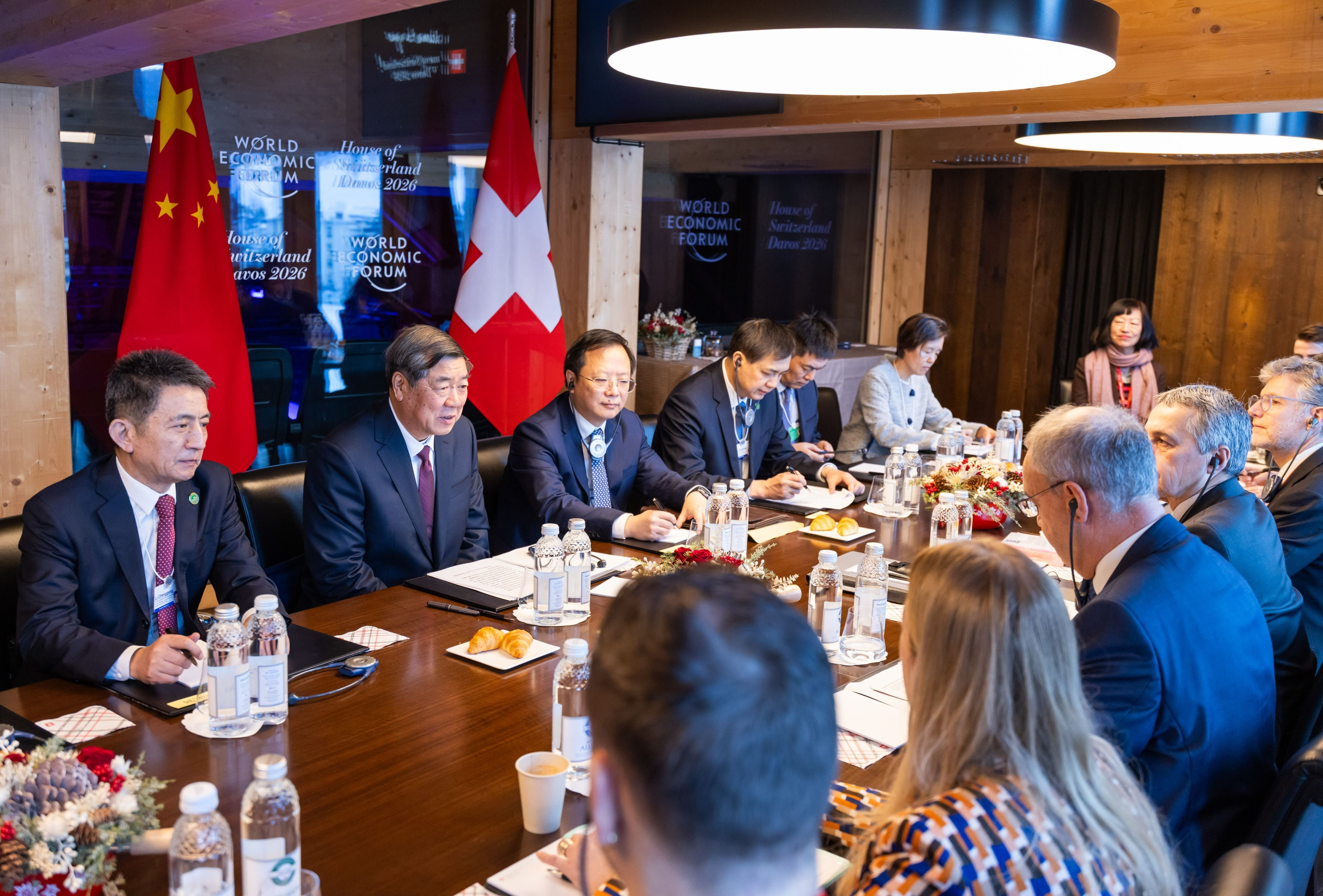
20 January 2026 – World Economic Forum (WEF) Annual Meeting in Davos: Guy Parmelin, President of the Swiss Confederation, Federal Councillor Ignazio Cassis and State Secretary Helene Budliger Artieda welcome He Lifeng, Vice Premier of China, and his delegation, including Li Chenggang, Vice Minister of Commerce, for talks on bilateral relations at the House of Switzerland.

Her career at the Federal Department of Foreign Affairs (FDFA) began in 1985 as a secretary in Bern. In this function, Helene Budliger made her first foreign assignments in Lagos in Nigeria, Havana in Cuba and San Francisco in the US. She completed the FDFA stage in Bern and the practical part as a consular employee in Strasbourg. She successfully completed the stage in 1994. Budliger Artieda's first stop after her training took her to Lima, Peru, where she met her future husband.

During her employment at the Swiss Embassy in Colombia, Helen Budliger Artieda studied business administration in Bogotá. She completed her studies with a Master's degree. She returned to Switzerland in 2000 and held various positions in the FDFA's Finance Division. From 1 July 2006 to 2008, Budliger Artieda was Head of Finance at the FDFA. In 2008, Foreign Minister Micheline Calmy-Rey appointed Helen Budliger Artieda as the first female director of the FDFA. On 1 October 2008, Budliger Artieda took over the Directorate for Resources at the FDFA from Martin Dahinden, who became head of the SDC. Until September 2015, she headed 380 employees and managed an annual budget volume of three billion Swiss francs.

In September 2015, Helene Budiger Artieda became Swiss Ambassador to South Africa. Namibia, Botswana, Lesotho, Eswatini and Mauritius were also part of her remit. She was also Ambassador to the Southern African Development Community (SADC) in Gaborone. On 14 December 2018, the Federal Council appointed Helene Budliger Artieda as Swiss ambassador to Thailand, Cambodia and Laos. She took up the new post in October 2019, succeeding Ivo Sieber. In 2022, she was proposed to the Federal Council by a search committee as the successor to Marie-Gabrielle Ineichen-Fleisch as Director of the State Secretariat for Economic Affairs (SECO). She took up the post on 1 August 2022. In September 2026, Budliger Artieda announced her resignation from her post at the end of March 2027.

Helene Budliger Artieda is married and lives in Eich LU. She grew up in Dübendorf.
