= Wang Shouwen =

Chinese politician

- 王受文
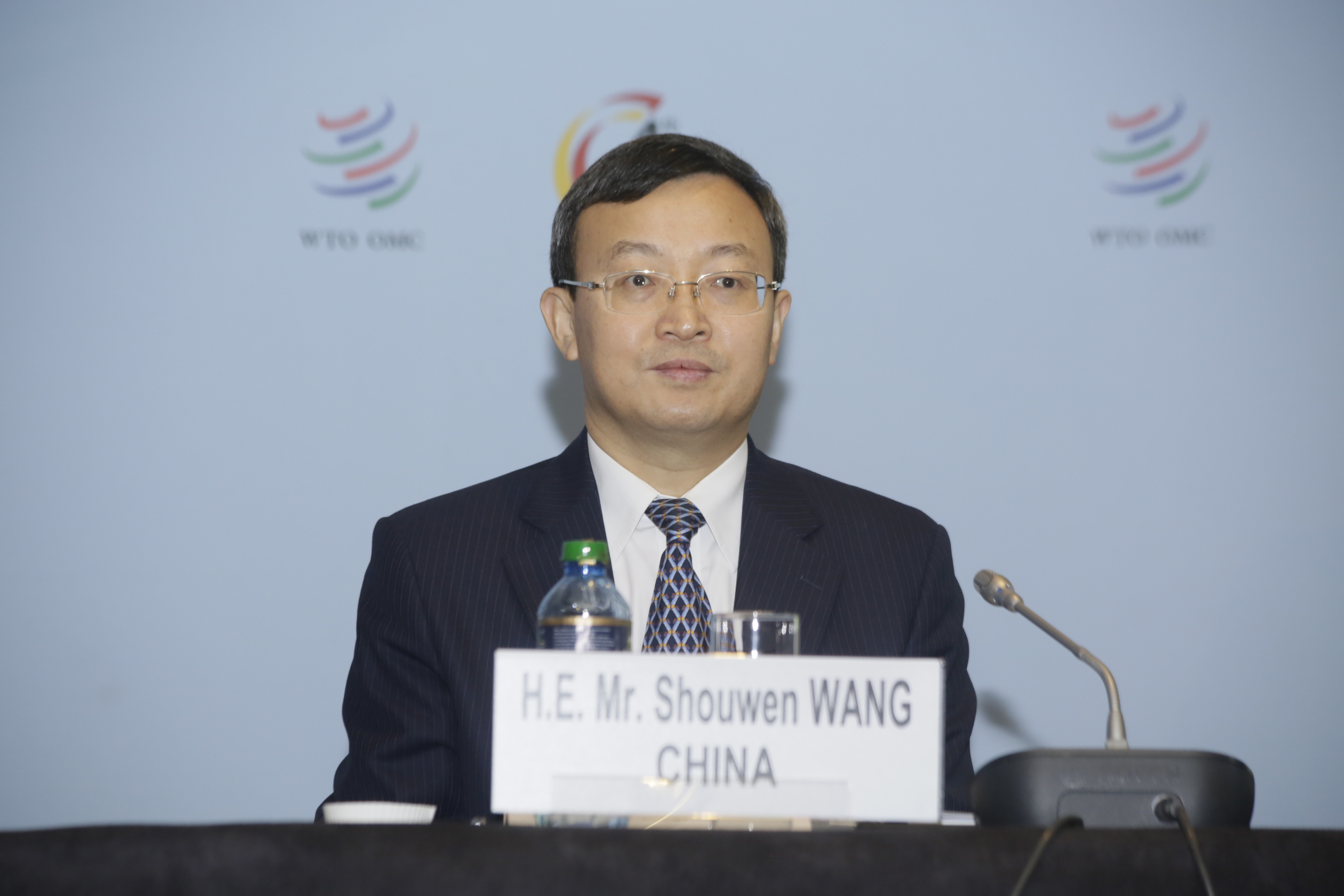
- Wang in December 2015 in Nairobi

China International Trade Representative
- In office July 2022 – April 2025
- Minister: Gao Hucheng; Zhong Shan; Wang Wentao
- Succeeded by: Li Chenggang

Personal details
- Born: March 1966 (age 60) Xuancheng, Anhui, China
- Party: Chinese Communist Party
- Education: Hunan University; University of International Business and Economics; Peking University

Wang Shouwen (Chinese: 王受文; pinyin: Wáng Shouwen; born March 1966) is a Chinese economist and politician. He served as the China International Trade Representative (Full Ministerial Rank) at the Ministry of Commerce of China from July 2022 to April 2025 and as Vice Minister of Commerce of China from April 2015 to April 2025. He left the Ministry of Commerce for a leadership position at the All-China Federation of Industry and Commerce in April 2025.

== Early life and education ==
Wang was born in Xuancheng, Anhui, in March 1966. He holds a bachelor's degree in engineering from Hunan University, a master's degree in economics from the University of International Business and Economics, and a doctorate in economics from Peking University.

== Career ==
Wang joined the Chinese Communist Party (CCP) in April 1986.

Wang was assigned to the Ministry of Commerce of the People's Republic of China in September 2003. He was director of the Department of Foreign Trade in December 2006. He moved up the ranks to become Assistant Minister of Commerce in August 2013 and Vice Minister of Commerce in April 2015. In July 8, 2022, he was appointed as the China International Trade Representative (Full Ministerial Rank). In April 2025, he left the Ministry of Commerce for a leadership position at the All-China Federation of Industry and Commerce.

=== Relations with the United States ===
During the aftermath of the 2008 financial crisis, Wang had warned the Obama administration not to retaliate against Chinese trade. According to a US diplomatic cable revealed by WikiLeaks, he was quoted saying: "If the new US administration employs protectionist trade measures, it could produce difficulties for China, and the Chinese side might have to take action."

During the US-China trade war, he was one of the trade negotiators during the first Trump presidency, alongside vice-premier Liu He, with negotiations resulting in the Phase One agreement.

Government offices
| Preceded by Yu Jianhua | International Trade Negotiation Representative of the Ministry of Commerce; 2022–2025 | Succeeded by Li Chenggang |
