= Ser Serpas =

American visual artist

- Born: 1995 (age 30–31)
- Known for: Earth-toned paintings Sculptures made from found objects

Ser Serpas (born 1995) is a visual artist from Los Angeles, California. Serpas is known for her earth-toned paintings, installations, and sculptures made from found objects. Ser Serpas is represented by Maxwell Graham, New York.

== Early life and education ==
Serpas grew up in the Boyle Heights neighborhood of Los Angeles. Her mother works for the Los Angeles Police Department.

In 2013, Serpas moved to Morningside Heights to attend Columbia University in New York City.

Before working as an artist, Serpas briefly interned with Susanne Bartsch.

== Work ==
Serpas's work incorporates sculptures built from trash found on the streets of major global cities. Serpas' first solo show was in Miami's Quinn Harrelson / Current Projects in 2017. Her work includes sculptures, poetry, paintings, and photography.

Serpas has completed artist-in-residence programs in Geneva, Tbilisi, and at the Cité internationale des arts in Paris (2023). Her work was shown at the 2024 Whitney Biennial.

== Cherish Project Space ==
In 2019, Serpas co-founded the artist-run project space Cherish in Geneva, together with Mohamed Almusibli, James Bantone, and Thomas Liu Le Lann.
