= Soft sculpture =

Sculpture made of nonrigid material

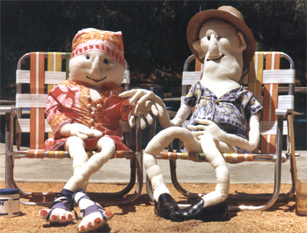
Soft-sculpture dolls created and photographed by Lindsey Hall of Gürze Designs, later Gürze Books

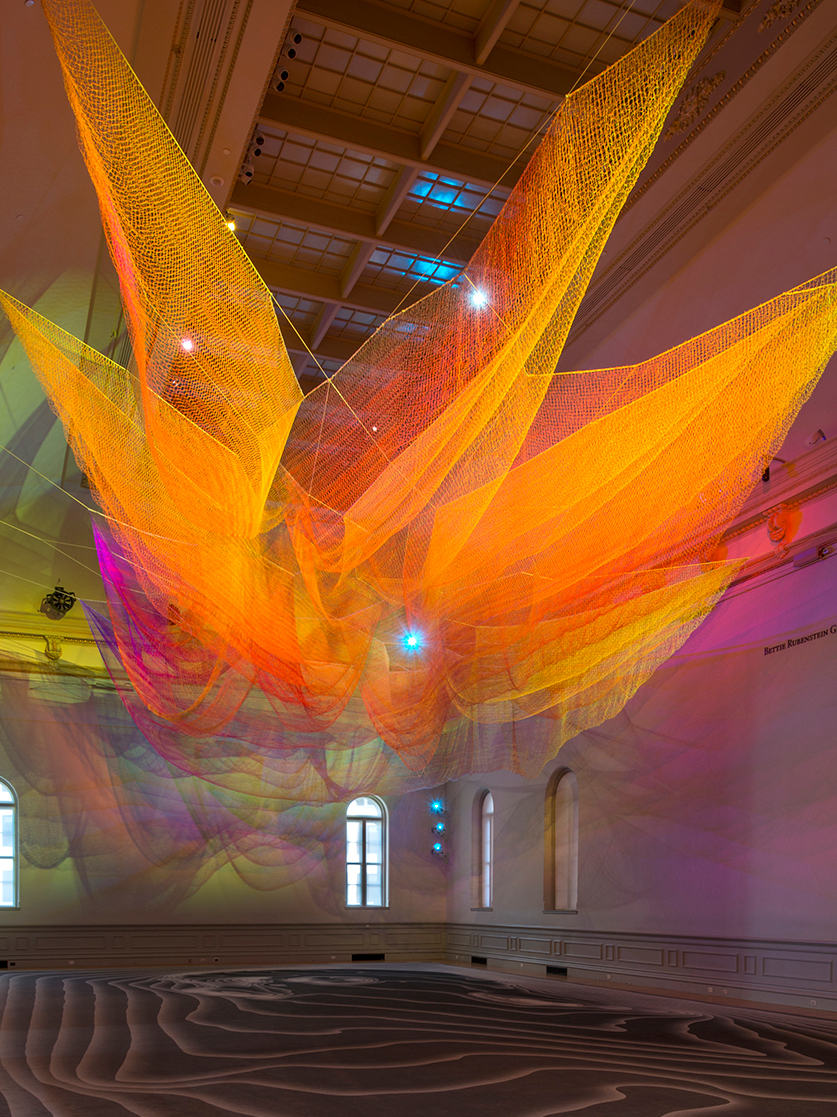
1.8 Renwick by Janet Echelman

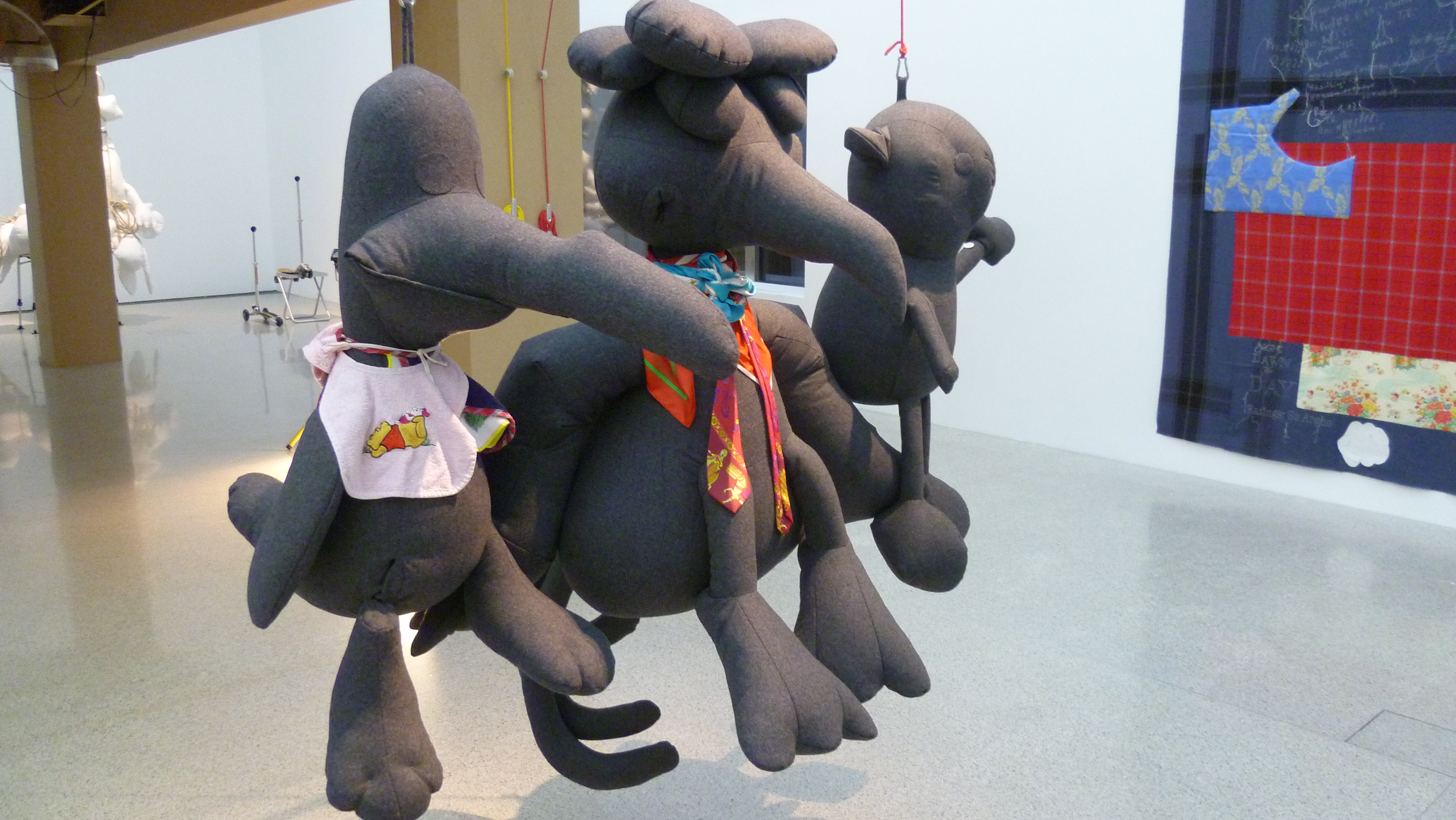
Soft Sculpture by Cosima von Bonin

Soft sculpture is a type of sculpture or three-dimensional form that incorporates materials such as cloth, fur, foam rubber, plastic, paper, fibre, or similar supple and non-rigid or pliable materials.

Soft sculptures can be stuffed, sewn, draped, stapled, glued, hung, or woven. These materials and techniques distinguish soft sculpture from sculpture made from more traditional hard materials, such as stone, bronze, or wood, that are then carved or modeled.

The term "soft sculpture" became a relevant art term in the 1960s, having been previously called "soft forms" or "objects" by the community of the time. It was popularized by the artist Claes Oldenburg, a member of the Pop Art movement, who created oversized sculptural replicas of everyday objects from soft materials. Oldenburg's objects typically began as realistic forms that were stitched and/or stuffed to create a piece of sculpture.

Soft sculptures can be traced back to the Victorian era (1880s), when Victorian women would insert small stuffed figures into their embroideries to memorialize their friends. However, the more common definition of soft sculpture can be dated back to the Dada movement of the 1920s and the readymade, which sought to break down the idea of traditional art by treating everyday objects with absurdity, similar to Oldenburg's ‘absurd’ and oversized, yet everyday, objects.

One example of a readymade soft sculpture is Marcel Duchamp’s 1917 piece entitled Traveller's Folding Item, created out of a textile typewriter cover.

More recently, contemporary sculptors such as Cosima von Bonin, Janet Echelman, Thomas Liu Le Lann, Faith Ringgold, Shinique Smith, or Yayoi Kusama have expanded techniques to address contemporary topics such as feminism, racial injustices, and other political beliefs.

== Purpose and subjects ==
The practice of taking humble, everyday objects and elevating them into high art created a form of "rebellion" against conventional sculpting that uses precious materials like metals and stone. Pieces often represent the human body and intimacy, associations that are formed due to the organic forms that soft materials often create.

== Relevant Artists ==
=== Claes Oldenburg (60s) ===
Soft sculptures were popularized in the 1960s by artists such as Claes Oldenburg, who is credited, along with other members of the Pop Art Movement, with the creation of soft sculpture. Oldenburg made oversized recreations of everyday items. Floor Burger represents a large hamburger patty nestled in the middle of two tan buns with a pickle for garnish on the top, all made from canvas filled with rubber foam and cardboard. In The Store, a project he conceived in 1981, Oldenburg made a selection of giant soft sculptures that were displayed and for sale at his storefront/studio in New York. The exhibition included works like Floor Cake and Floor Cone, which were sewn, stuffed, painted, and larger-than-life replicas of consumable items.

=== Yayoi Kusama (60s/70s) ===
Yayoi Kusama is another artist credited for the rise of soft sculpture in the 1960s. One of her earliest sculpture works is entitled Accumulation No. 1. Kusama hand-sewed and painted protuberances and attached them to an armchair. Some of Kusama's other works also incorporate repetition of soft sewn forms, often referred to as ‘phalluses’.

=== Faith Ringgold (70s) ===
Faith Ringgold was a prominent mixed-media artist in the 1960s and 1970s, who advocated for marginalized groups through paintings, performances, and soft sculpture. She experimented with soft sculpture as a new medium, crafting hanging and freestanding pieces. She was inspired by African culture throughout her works, replicating a similar style evident in African masks in her own renditions. These consisted of linen canvas, which she then painted, beaded, and wove with palm leaves (raffia) for hair. Her masks were sometimes human-sized sculptures, with pieces of rectangular cloth for dresses, and painted gourds that represented breasts. The well-known soft sculpture Ben depicts a homeless man decorated with flags, ribbons, and buttons, whose allusions to social movements of the 1970s (such as Black Power and the feminist movement), as well as American and Confederate flags, symbolize a person deeply interested in reforming the political system. Ringgold's story quilts, such as Who's Afraid of Aunt Jemima? (1983), echo these concerns.

=== Mike Kelley (80s/90s) ===
Mike Kelley was a notable American artist who worked with a wide variety of media, including found objects, audio, and textiles. During his early years, he was involved in Detroit's local music scene and later attended and graduated from the California Institute of the Arts with a Master of Fine Arts degree. Throughout his career, he became a highly influential member of the Conceptual Art movement. His art often included themes concerning abjection, youth, class, and the divide between high and low culture. One of his most noteworthy works, Deodorized sculpture, is titled Deodorized Central Mass with Satellites (1991–99). The piece consists of many stuffed animals that he purchased second-hand and organized into clusters and hung from the ceiling of the exhibit. Kelley described stuffed animals as "the adult’s perfect model of a child" and by displaying them in their tattered state they represent lost innocence and trauma.

=== Shinique Smith (Present) ===
Shinique Smith is a current artist celebrated for transforming everyday materials into vibrant abstract works of art. Smith primarily began to experiment with cloth and politics in her art after reading an article in The New York Times Magazine about bales of donated T-shirts being shipped from New York to Uganda. In Smith's works, Bale Variant No. 0017 and Favorite Things, she draws parallels between the bales shipped to Uganda and the historical bales of cotton from the US South, linking the materialization of the fabric to its origins. In the recent piece made by Smith, Grace Stands Beside from 2020 during the Black Lives Matter protests, Smith uses donated garments and fabrics from Baltimore residents to make a large-scale deity sculpture as a monument to Grace, a state of being that black people have endured prejudice embodied as a means to survive. The title Grace Stands Beside reclaims language from an inscription on the base of a Confederate monument that states "Glory stands beside our grief."

== Feminism ==
The connection between soft sculpture and Feminism can be attributed to how fiber work has been historically coded as "women's work" and therefore devalued relative to "high" sculpture in hard materials. In the 1960s-70s, many feminist artists turned to textiles, pushing the boundaries between art and craft. Jann Haworth created a soft sculpture titled Old Lady II, which depicts the feminist qualities of soft sculpture by depicting her grandmother making a quilt made out of a gown, cloth, and many hand-stitched elements. The sculpture celebrates women and feminism through the use of traditional techniques associated with women.

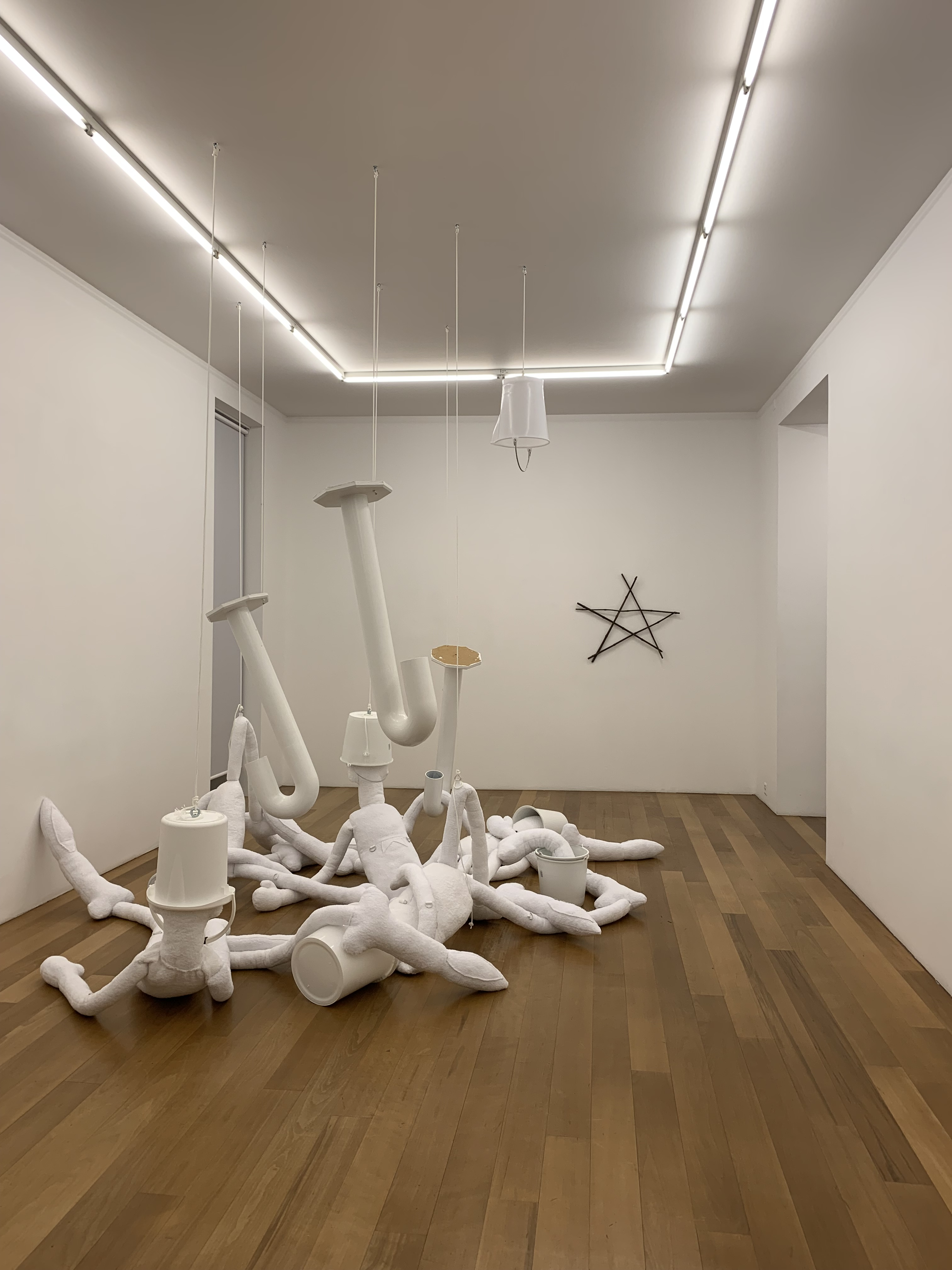
Soft Heroes by Thomas Liu Le Lann
