= Thomas Liu Le Lann =

French multimedia artist

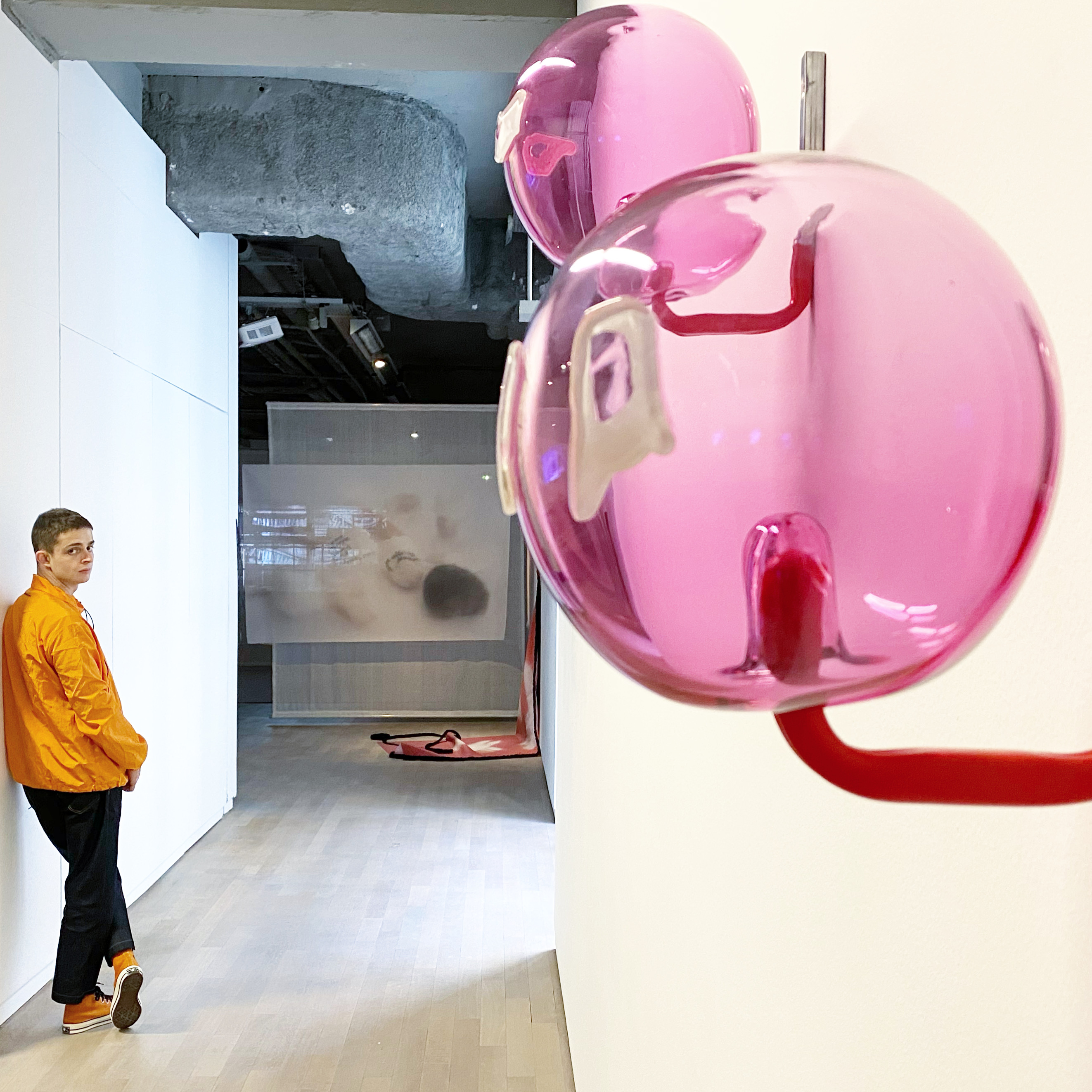
Thomas Liu Le Lann, during the exhibition Études sur l'Empathie at the Fondation d'entreprise Ricard, taken on December 2, 2019.

Thomas Liu Le Lann (born 1994 in Geneva, Switzerland) is a French artist who lives and works in Geneva. Thomas Liu Le Lann creates sculptures and installations in various techniques using fabric, glass, wood, photography, poetry and found objects.

== Early life and education ==
2016 Thomas Liu Le Lann graduated from the École des Beaux-Arts in Nantes with a Bachelor's degree and in 2017 from the Beijing University of Language and Culture with the same degree after studying Chinese language and literature. In 2018, he obtained a Master's degree in contemporary artistic practice at the HEAD (Haute École de Design de Genève) in Geneva, with Verena Dengler and Lili Reynaud-Dewar. Thomas Liu Le Lann has been selected as a Residency Artist 2025 at BY ART MATTERS, affiliated with BY ART MATTERS Museum in Hangzhou, China. He is nominated as a finalist for the Swiss Art Award in 2026.

== Work ==
In his sculptures, videos, sound installations, photographs and texts, he explores powerlessness, failure and vulnerability through a mixture of intimate experience and collective history. In doing so, he questions the individual's relationship to childhood, family, work, capitalist production systems and leisure society. With his works, he constructs visual narratives that play with scale and materials and question what it means to be a hero. In an interview with Hans Ulrich Obrist, he cites the oeuvre of Cosima von Bonin and Ida Ekblad as influences.

Thomas Liu Le Lann was co-founder and co-administrator of Cherish, an artist-run exhibition space in Geneva, in collaboration with Ser Serpas, Mohamed Almusibli and James Bantone.

His texts are often part of his exhibitions. He names Marguerite Duras, in particular Un barrage contre le Pacifique, Le Ravissement de Lol V. Stein and l'Amant, Paul B. Preciado, Guillaume Dustan as well as Hervé Guibert, Voyage avec deux enfants and Le Mausolée des amants as authors whose works are of fundamental importance to him.

For the Milo exhibition at Dittrich & Schlechtriem for the Berlin Gallery Weekend 2022, he created a giant glass pacifier, which he placed on a stack of pallets. The raw, untreated wood stands in stark contrast to the smooth teat. Liu Le Lann's works are sometimes fluffy and soft, sometimes stretchy, then again cool and smooth. Terry cloth meets glass, velvet nestles against vinyl. In his works, he repeatedly makes references to people who were close to him. The installation entitled Amore E Morte from 2021 consists of leather shoes on a glass floor in which you can see yourself reflected, reminding the artist of Milo, a former lover. A publication with contributions by Pierre-Alexandre Mateos, Charles Teyssou and Ser Serpas was published on this subject.

Thomas Liu Le Lann developed the Soft Heroes series. He cites Claes Oldenburg and Cosima von Bonin as references. The art critic Paul Clinton compared them to "the untraceable love objects in Dennis Cooper's fiction", because the boys Cooper is obsessed with have no recognizable characteristics and refuse to express themselves. In the Soft Heroes series, he deals with the elaboration of fictions inspired by popular culture. In this way, he creates these soft sculptures that are installed on the floor as figures without a face or expression, whose only visible attitude seems to be that they have given up on the world around them. The gigantic figures are slack, sometimes bordering on formlessness, like overworked, modern and tired superheroes. Dressed in a harlequin mask, they could also be on their way to the next bank robbery.

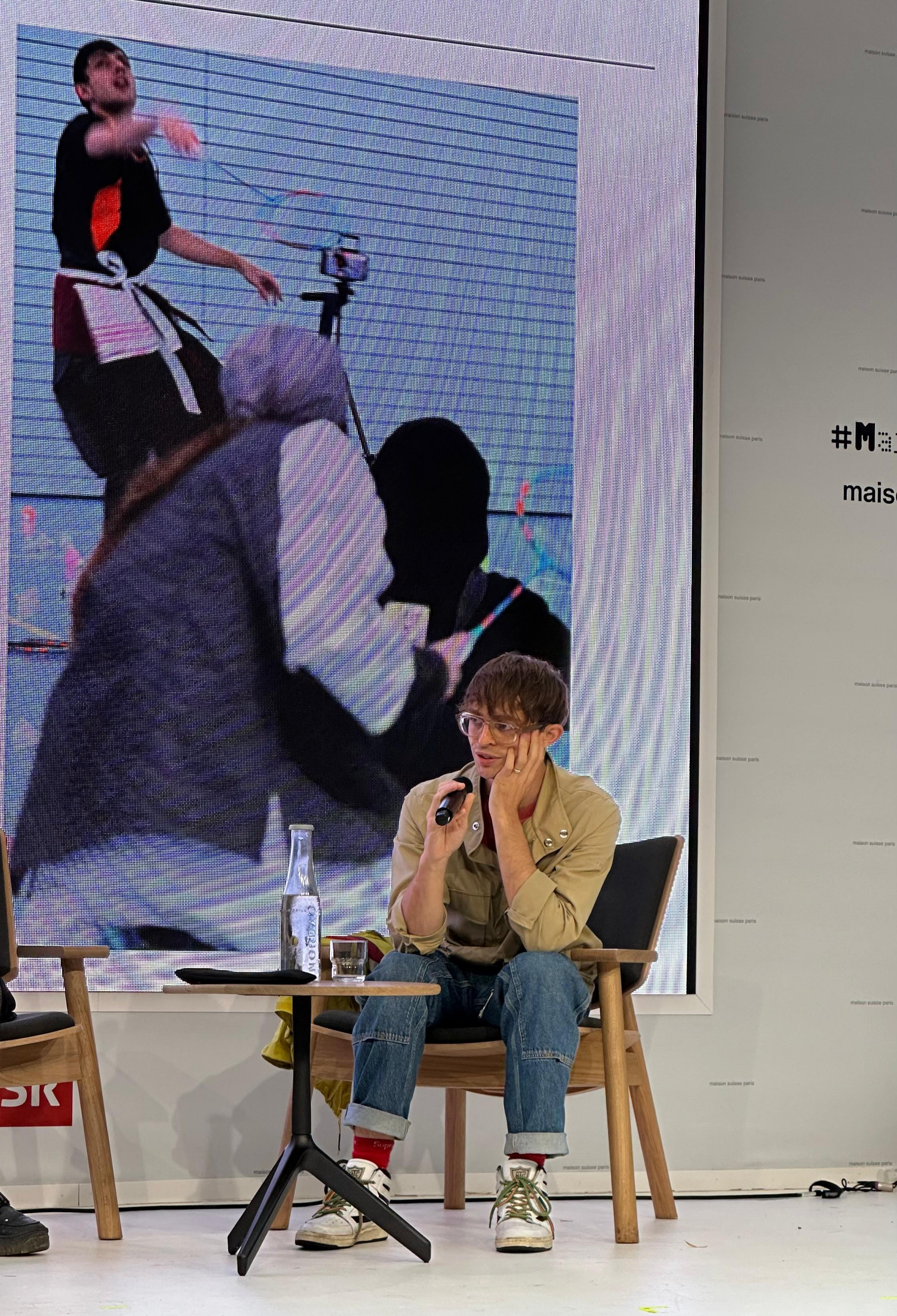
Thomas Liu Le Lann at the Maison Suisse artist talk of the House of Switzerland on September 5, 2024, on the occasion of the 2024 Olympic Games in Paris.

For his participation in the Berthoud, Lissignol-Chevalier and Galland scholarships of the City of Geneva, he was awarded a prize in the visual arts category in September 2023. For the presentation at the Centre d'Art Contemporain Genève, he created an installation consisting of two left, glass boxing gloves and a video showing him in fencing gear.

For the Christmas campaign of the Parisian department store La Samaritaine in winter 2023, he realized an installation of glass lollipops on the occasion of the film Wonka, which thematized feelings of pleasure, longing and desire.

For the House of Switzerland – Maison Suisse of the 2024 Summer Olympics in Paris, he developed the video installation entitled GYM, which shows a group of participants with limited technical and physical abilities oscillating between improvisation and editing, inspired by the language of sports television. The video-installation GYM was part of his first institutional solo exhibition in Germany entitled Entertain in fall 2024 at the Galerie für Gegenwartskunst E-Werk Freiburg im Breisgau, Germany.

== Awards ==
- 2018 New HEADs Fondation BNP Paribas Art Awards, Geneva, Switzerland
- 2018 Prize HEAD Gallery, Galerie Xippas, Geneva, Switzerland
- 2023 „Visual Arts grant", Grants of the City of Geneva
- 2025 Residency Artist 2025, BY ART MATTERS Museum, Hangzhou, China
- 2026 Finalist Swiss Art Award, Basel, Switzerland

== Collections ==
Liu Le Lann's work is held in the following permanent collections:

- Museo d’arte della Svizzera italiana (MASI), Lugano, Switzerland
- La Samaritaine (DFS Group), Paris, France
- Fond Cantonal d’Art Contemporain, Geneva, Switzerland
- Fondation BNP Paribas, Geneva, Switzerland
