= Davos Congress Centre =

Convention centre in Switzerland

Coordinates: 46.8007°N 9.8314°E

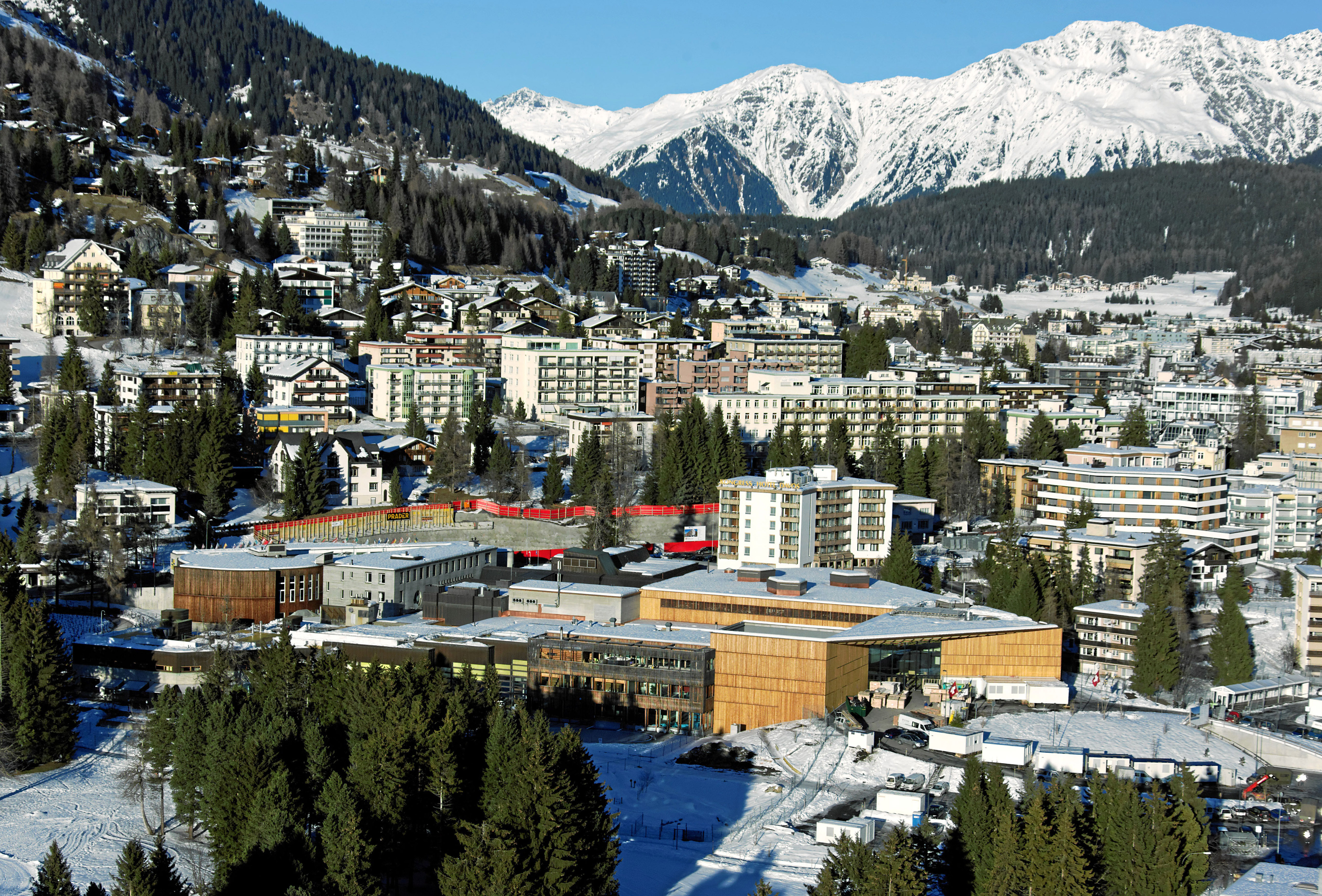
The Davos Congress Centre seen from the air

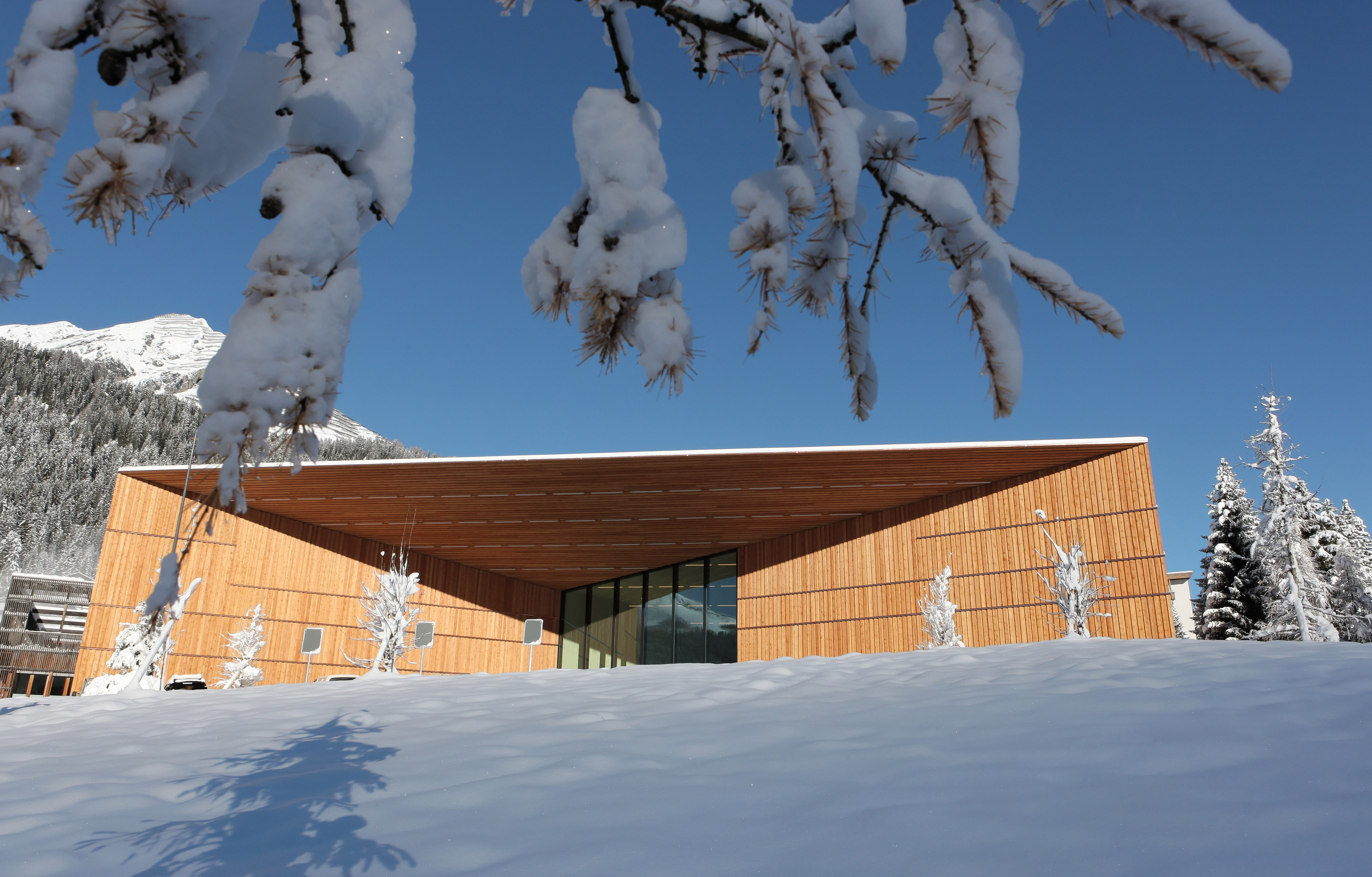
Main entrance

The Davos Congress Centre is the major convention centre in Davos, Switzerland. It opened in 1969 and has undergone major transformations and extensions in 1979, 1989 and 2010. It has hosted the meetings of the World Economic Forum since 1971.
