= State Secretariat for Economic Affairs (Switzerland) =

State Secretariat for Economic Affairs SECO Switzerland

Secretariat for Economic Affairs

Agency overview
- Jurisdiction: Federal administration of Switzerland
- Headquarters: Bern
- Agency executive: Helene Budliger Artieda
- Parent agency: Federal Department of Economic Affairs, Education and Research
- Website: seco.admin.ch

The State Secretariat for Economic Affairs (often termed as SECO) is Switzerland's governmental center of expertise for economic policy, which includes economic development cooperation.

Together with the Swiss Agency for Development and Cooperation (SDC) and the Peace and Human Rights Division (PHRD) of the Federal Department of Foreign Affairs, it is in charge of implementing Switzerland's international cooperation.

== History ==
SECO was created in 1999 by the merger of the then Federal Office of Foreign Economic Affairs and the Federal Office for Economic Development and Employment (Note: German: Bundesamt für Wirtschaftsentwicklung und Arbeit, BIGA; French: Office fédéral du développement économique et de l'emploi, OFIAMT; Italian: Ufficio federale dell'industria, delle arti e mestieri e del lavoro, UFIA) (formerly known as Federal Office of Industry, Crafts and Labor, FOICL). (Note: German: Bundesamt für Industrie, Gewerbe und Arbeit; French: Office fédéral de l’industrie, des arts et métiers et du travail; Italian: Ufficio federale dello sviluppo economico e del lavoro) SECO was described at the time as a "superdepartment" for all things related to Economic affairs in Switzerland.

FOICL was created in 1929 as a result of the merger between the Division of Industry and Trade (Note: French: Division de l’industrie et des arts et métiers) and the Federal Office of Labor. (Note: French: Office fédéral du travail)

== Full-time positions since 2007 ==
Raw data

Source: "Federal Finance Administration FFA: Data portal".

== See also ==
- Economy of Switzerland

== Links ==
- Official website
