= China–United States trade war =

Economic conflict since 2018

United States trade war with China
- Part of the first & second presidency of Donald Trump and Joe Biden
- Date: 22 January 2018 – present (8 years and 10 months)
- Location: China; United States
- Caused by: Tariffs imposed by the United States
- Status: Continuous negotiations/strategic competition: First series of major United States tariffs on China took effect on 22 January 2018; First series of major Chinese retaliatory tariffs on the U.S. began on 2 April 2018; Tariffs remained in place and additional levies on Chinese goods were introduced under the Biden administration; New series of sweeping United States tariffs on many countries, including at high rates on China, were imposed in 2025, including the Liberation Day tariffs

Parties
China	United States

Lead figures
(China) Xi Jinping; (China) Liu He; (China) Zhong Shan; (China) He Lifeng; (China) Wang Wentao	(United States) Donald Trump; (United States) Joe Biden; (United States) Steven Mnuchin; (United States) Wilbur Ross; (United States) Janet Yellen; (United States) Gina Raimondo; (United States) Scott Bessent; (United States) Howard Lutnick

An economic conflict between China and the United States has been ongoing since January 2018, when US president Donald Trump began imposing tariffs and other trade barriers on China with the aim of forcing it to make changes to what the US has said are longstanding unfair trade practices and intellectual property theft. The first Trump administration stated that these practices may contribute to the US–China trade deficit, and that the Chinese government requires the transfer of American technology to China. In response to the trade measures, CCP general secretary Xi Jinping's administration accused the Trump administration of engaging in nationalist protectionism and took retaliatory action. Following the trade war's escalation through 2019, the two sides reached a tense phase-one agreement in January 2020. However, because of a temporary collapse in goods trade around the globe during the COVID-19 pandemic together with a short recession diminished the chance of meeting the target, China failed to buy the $200 billion worth of additional imports specified. By the end of Trump's first presidency, the trade war was widely characterized by American media outlets as a failure for the United States.

The Biden administration kept the tariffs in place and added additional levies on Chinese goods such as electric vehicles and solar panels. In 2024, the Trump presidential campaign proposed a 60% tariff on Chinese goods.

2025 marked a significant escalation of the conflict under the second Trump administration. A series of increasing tariffs led to the US imposing a 145% tariff on Chinese goods, and China imposing a 125% tariff on American goods in response; These measures are forecast to cause a 0.2% loss of global merchandise trade. Despite this, both countries have excluded certain items from their tariff lists and continue to try and find a resolution to the trade war.

== Background ==
United States trade deficits from 1997 to 2021. Deficits are over 50 billion dollars as of 2021 with the countries shown. Data from the US Census Bureau.

=== Trade relationship ===
Since the 1980s, Trump had advocated tariffs to eliminate the US trade deficit and promote domestic manufacturing, saying the country was being "ripped off" by its trading partners; imposing tariffs became a major plank of his presidential campaign. Nearly all economists who responded to surveys conducted by the Associated Press and Reuters said Trump's tariffs would do more harm than good to the American economy, and some economists advocated alternate means to address trade deficits with China.

US president Bill Clinton and Chinese leader Jiang Zemin with their spouses during a state dinner at the White House, October 29, 1997

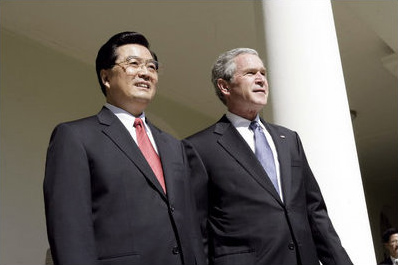
US president George W. Bush and Chinese leader Hu Jintao at the White House, April 20, 2006

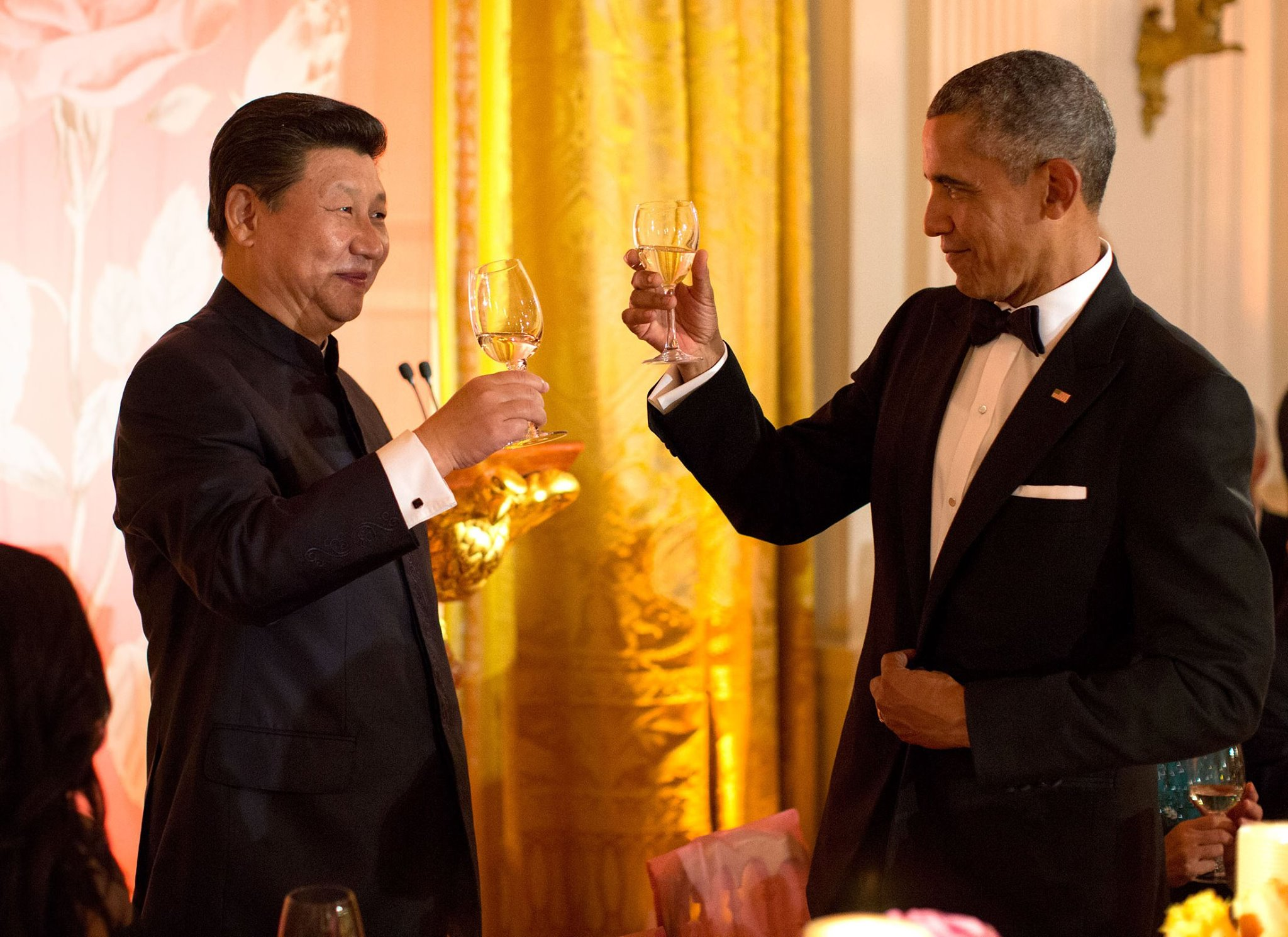
US president Barack Obama and Chinese leader Xi Jinping raising a toast during a state dinner at the White House, September 25, 2015

With the United States–China Relations Act of 2000, China was allowed to join the World Trade Organization (WTO) in 2001 and was given most favored nation (MFN) status. The growth of trade accelerated after China's entry into the WTO in 2001, with the US and China becoming one another's most important trading partners. The US has consistently imported more from China than it has exported to China, with the bilateral US trade deficit in goods with China rising to $375.6 billion in 2017. According to Keyu Jin, this trade deficit is driven by a difference in saving rates between the US and China (Chinese households save more than 30% of disposable income on average, compared to 7% in the United States) while according to Xiaohuan Lan, the deficit is driven by the way the economic systems of the two countries are structured: the US imports more than it exports since its domestic consumption is greater than its domestic production of goods while China exports more than it imports since its domestic production is greater than its domestic consumption of goods.

Since the entry of China into the WTO in December 2001, the decline in US manufacturing jobs has accelerated (the China shock). The Economic Policy Institute estimated that the trade deficit with China cost about 2.7 million jobs between 2001 and 2011, including manufacturing and other industries. Since 2000, there have been several attempts to repeal the Permanent Normal Trade Relations with China. The strongest attempt was in 2005 when House Representative Bernie Sanders and 61 co-sponsors introduced a legislation that would repeal the PNTR with China.

There have been studies which have explored the strategic dimension of the trading relationship which some have argued is the best way to understand the main concerns over the way the relationship has developed.

The US government has at times criticized various aspects of the US-China trade relationship, including large bilateral trade deficits, and China's relatively inflexible exchange rates. The administrations of George W. Bush and Barack Obama imposed quotas and tariffs on Chinese textiles in order to shield US domestic producers, accusing China of exporting these products at dumping prices. During the Obama administration, the US additionally accused China of subsidizing aluminum and steel production, and initiated a range of anti-dumping investigations against China. During these two US administrations, US-Chinese trade continued to grow. During this time, China's economy grew to be the second largest in the world (using nominal exchange rates), second only to that of the US. Large-scale Chinese economic initiatives, such as the Belt and Road Initiative, the Asian Infrastructure Investment Bank and "Made in China 2025" alarmed some US policymakers. More broadly, China's economic growth has been viewed by the US government as a challenge to American economic and geopolitical dominance.

American proponents of tariffs on China have argued that tariffs will bring manufacturing jobs to the US; that bilateral tariffs should be reciprocal; that the US should eliminate its trade deficit with China; and that China should change various policies governing intellectual property and investment. Most economists are skeptical of the ability of tariffs to achieve the first three of these goals. A study estimates that US exports to China provide support to 1.2 million American jobs and that Chinese multinational companies directly employ 197,000 Americans, while US companies invested $105 billion in China in 2019. Economists have studied the impact of trade with China and increasing labor productivity on employment in the American manufacturing sector, with mixed results. Most economists believe that the American trade deficit is the result of macroeconomic factors, rather than trade policy. Two 2020 Congressional Research Service reports said most economists concluded that the long-run net effect of trade on the economy as a whole was positive and that attempts to address the trade deficit without addressing the underlying macroeconomic conditions would likely be counterproductive and create distortions in the economy.

The US and China held talks in Beijing between US National Security Adviser Jake Sullivan and CCP Foreign Affairs Commission Office Director Wang Yi to prevent competition from escalating into conflict. The meetings aimed to stabilize strained relations and maintain open communication.

=== Trump administration's complaints ===
Donald Trump's first noted advocacy for tariffs was prompted by Japanese economic success in the 1980s, arguing that the US trade deficit was a burden and that tariffs would promote domestic manufacturing that would keep the United States from being "ripped off" by its trading partners. In early 2011, he stated that because China has manipulated their currency, "it is almost impossible for our companies to compete with Chinese companies." Imposing tariffs was subsequently a major plank of his successful 2016 presidential campaign.

In the 2016 US presidential election, Trump ran on a protectionist economic platform. During his 2016 presidential campaign, Donald Trump promised to reduce the US trade deficit with China, which he attributed to unfair trade practices, such as intellectual property theft and lack of access by US companies to the Chinese market. Trade advisor Peter Navarro was given an office on the 14th floor of Trump Tower, where he worked on economic plans that heavily focused on starting a trade war against China. As president, in August 2017, he directed the Office of the United States Trade Representative (USTR) to investigate Chinese economic practices. The resulting report, issued in March 2018, attacked many aspects of Chinese economic policy, focusing particularly on alleged technology transfer, which the report stated cost the US economy $225 billion and $600 billion annually. Following the issuing of the report, Trump ordered the imposition of tariffs on Chinese products, the filing of a WTO case against China and restrictions on Chinese investment in high-tech sectors of the US economy. Navarro was influential in pushing Trump to start the trade war; in his 2021 book In Trump Time, Navarro wrote that he urged Trump to go "full Sudden Zen" and start an all-out trade war against China.

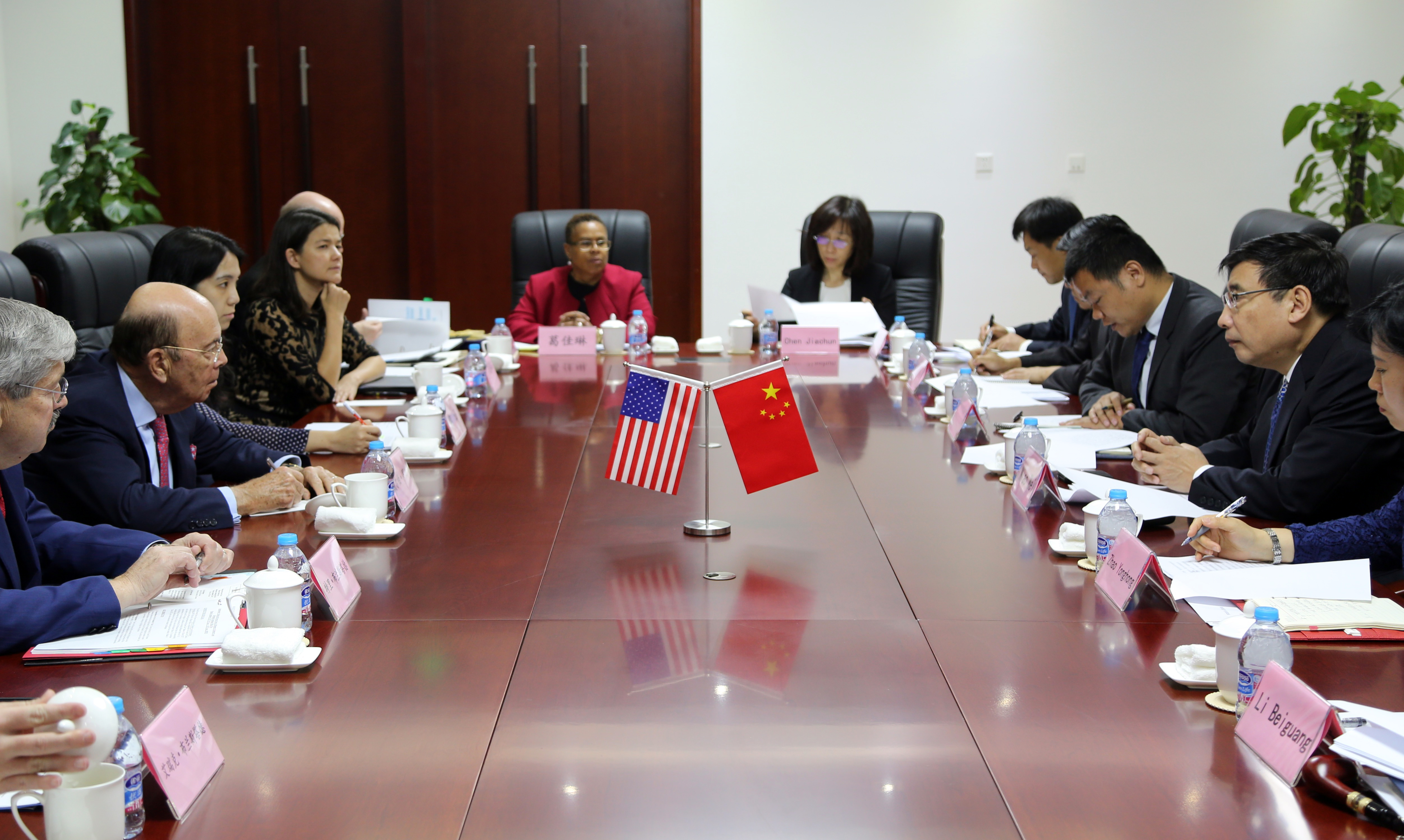
US Secretary of Commerce Wilbur Ross meets with Chinese Minister of Industry and Information Technology Miao Wei, Beijing, September 2017.

In supporting tariffs as president, he said that China was costing the American economy hundreds of billions of dollars a year because of unfair trade practices. After imposing tariffs, he denied entering into a trade war, saying the "trade war was lost many years ago by the foolish, or incompetent, people who represented the US" He said that the US has a trade deficit of $500 billion a year, with intellectual property (IP) theft costing an additional $300 billion. "We cannot let this continue," he said. Former White House Counsel, Jim Schultz, said that "through multiple presidential administrations – Clinton, Bush and Obama – the United States has naively looked the other way while China cheated its way to an unfair advantage in the international trade market."

In August 2017, Robert Lighthizer investigated China's alleged unfair trade practices. According to the administration, the Chinese government's reforms have been minimal and have not been fair and reciprocal: "After years of US-China dialogues that produced minimal results and commitments that China did not honor, the United States is taking action to confront China over its state-led, market-distorting forced technology transfers, intellectual property practices, and cyber intrusions of US commercial networks."

Technology is considered the most important part of the US economy. According to US Trade Representative Robert E. Lighthizer, China maintains a policy of "forced technology transfer," along with practicing "state capitalism," including buying US technology companies and using cybertheft to gain technology. As a result, officials in the Trump administration were, by early 2018, taking steps to prevent Chinese state-controlled companies from buying American technology companies and were trying to stop American companies from handing over their key technologies to China as a cost of entering their market. According to political analyst Josh Rogin: "There was a belief that China would develop a private economy that would prove compatible with the WTO system. Chinese leadership has made a political decision to do the opposite. So now we have to respond." Lighthizer said that the value of the tariffs imposed was based on US estimates of the actual economic damage caused by alleged theft of intellectual property and foreign-ownership restrictions that require foreign companies to transfer technology.

Over half of the members of the American Chamber of Commerce in the People's Republic of China thought that leakage of intellectual property was an important concern when doing business there.

Initiating steel and aluminum tariff actions in March 2018, Trump said "trade wars are good, and easy to win," but as the conflict continued to escalate through August 2019, Trump stated, "I never said China was going to be easy."

Peter Navarro, White House Office of Trade and Manufacturing Policy Director, explained that the tariffs are "purely defensive measures" to reduce the trade deficit. He says that the cumulative trillions of dollars that Americans transfer overseas as a result of yearly deficits are then used by those countries to buy America's assets, as opposed to investing that money in the US "If we do as we're doing ... those trillions of dollars are in the hands of foreigners that they can then use to buy up America."

=== China's response and counter allegations ===
The Chinese government argues that the US government's real goal is to stifle China's growth, and that the trade war has had a negative global effect. The Chinese government has blamed the American government for starting the conflict and said that US actions were making negotiations difficult. Zhang Xiangchen, China's ambassador to the World Trade Organization, said the US Trade Representative was operating with a "presumption of guilt", making claims without evidence and based on speculation.

The Chinese government has denied forced transfer of IP is a mandatory practice, and acknowledged the impact of domestic R&D performed in China. Former US treasury secretary Larry Summers assessed that Chinese leadership in some technological fields was the result of "huge government investment in basic science" and not "theft" of US properties. In March 2019, the National People's Congress endorsed a new foreign investment bill, to take effect in 2020, which explicitly prohibits the forced transfer of IP from foreign companies, and grants stronger protection to foreign intellectual property and trade secrets. China had also planned to lift restrictions on foreign investment in the automotive industry in 2022. AmCham China policy committee chair Lester Ross criticized the bill, saying the text of the bill was "rushed" and "broad", and also criticized a portion of the bill that granted the country power to retaliate against countries that impose restrictions on Chinese companies.

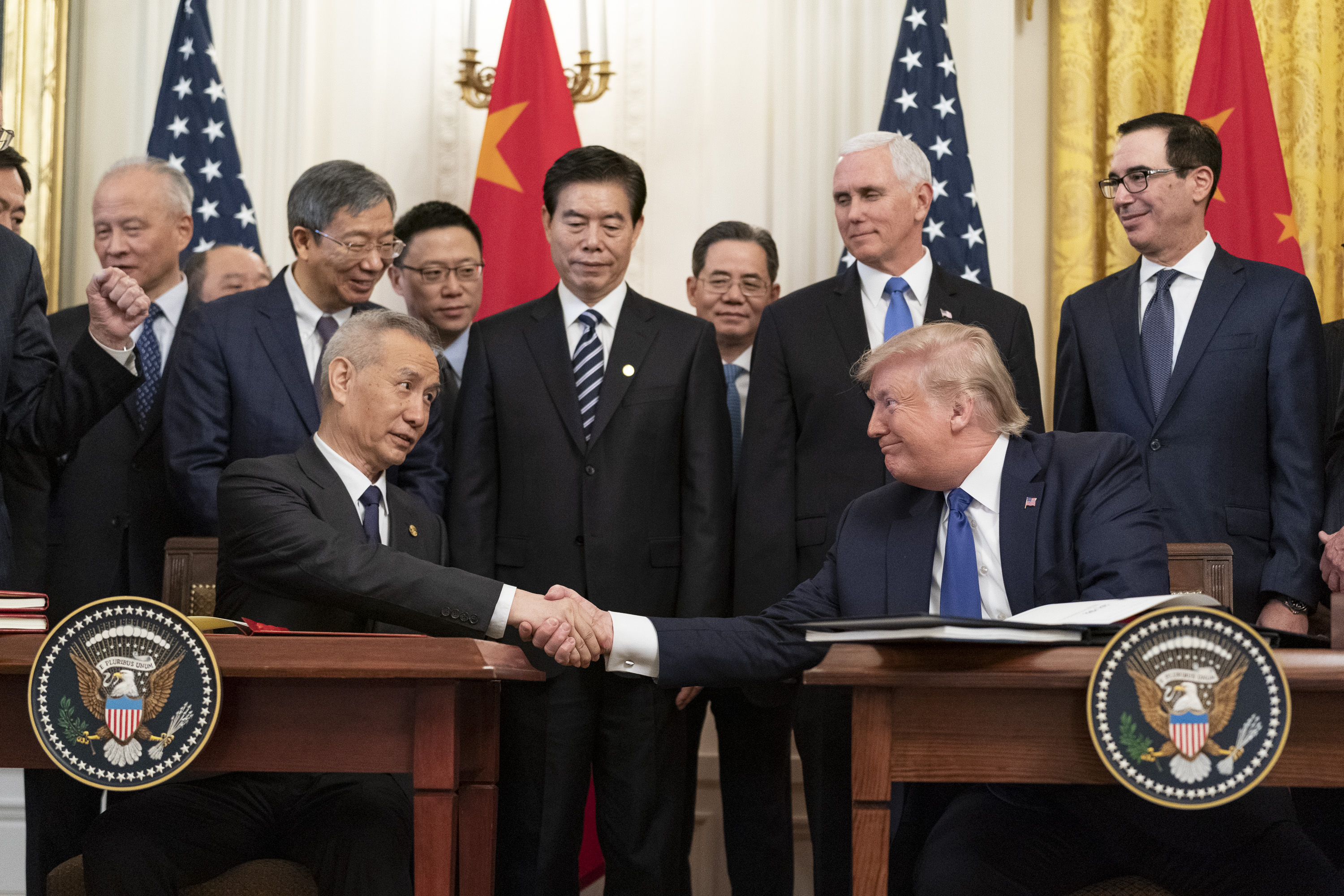
President Donald Trump, joined by Chinese Vice Premier Liu He, sign the US-China Phase One Trade Agreement on January 15, 2020, in the East Room of the White House.

In January 2020, the US and China signed a "phase one" trade deal, under which China committed to purchasing $200 billion of US goods and services over the next two years. A temporary collapse in goods trade around the globe during the COVID-19 pandemic together with a short recession diminished the chance of meeting this target, China imported less than it had before the trade war.

On January 20, 2021, China imposed sanctions against outgoing US Secretary of State Mike Pompeo, former secretary of health and human services Alex Azar, former under secretary of state Keith J. Krach, outgoing US ambassador to the United Nations Kelly Craft, and 24 other former Trump officials. Biden's National Security Council called the sanctions "unproductive and cynical."

=== Biden administration restrictions ===
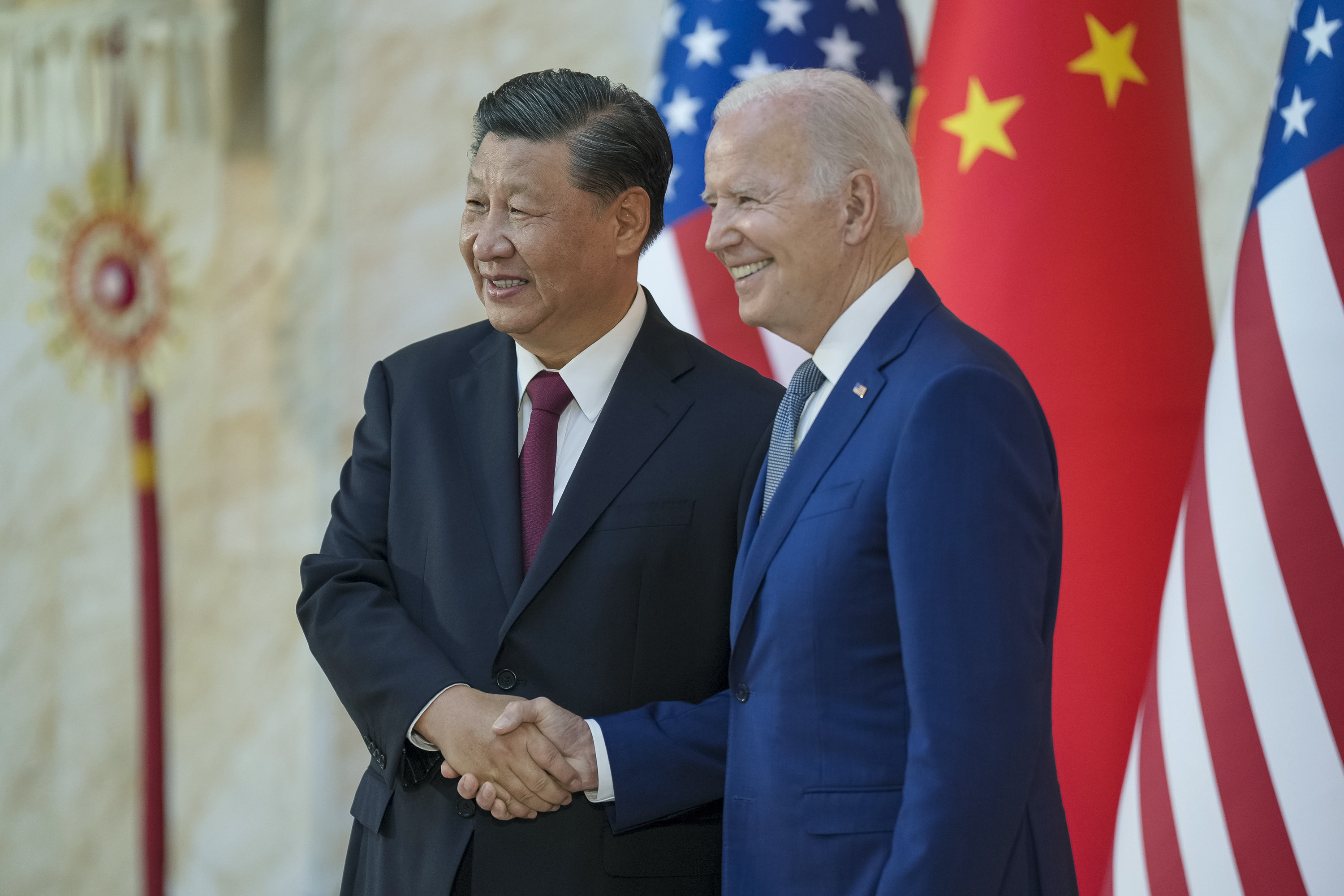
US president Joe Biden and Chinese leader Xi Jinping holding a bilateral meeting at the G20 summit in Bali, November 14, 2022

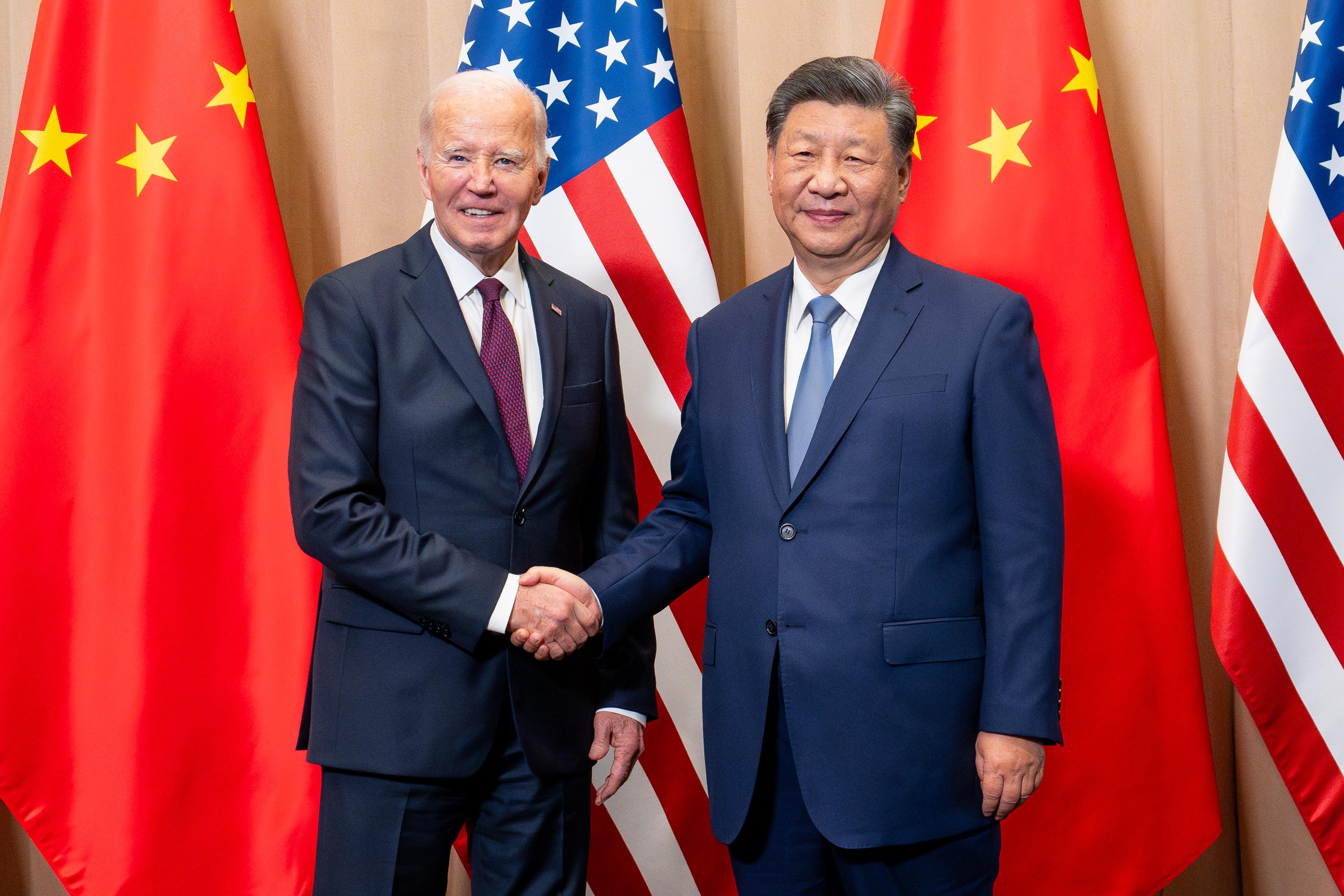
US president Joe Biden and Chinese leader Xi Jinping holding a bilateral meeting at the APEC summit in Lima, November 16, 2024

According to JPMorgan Chase, the effective rate of US tariffs on Chinese goods was between 0–5% in 2018 and climbed to around 20% by 2021, when President Joe Biden took office. The Biden administration did not withdraw Trump-era tariffs on Chinese imports and this rate remained steady throughout Biden's term.

On 3 June 2021, Biden signed Executive Order 14032 which saw the expansion of Executive Order 13959 signed by the Trump administration as preventing American investors from investing in Chinese companies identified by the US government as having ties to China's military or surveillance industry.

The Democratic administration introduced a number of new export limits and US investment bans for Chinese companies to protect US economic and military interests. In October 2022, the US Department of Commerce expanded sanctions after implicating 50 Chinese companies, including telecoms equipment maker Huawei in June 2021. Export controls were also introduced for chip maker Nvidia, Yangtze Memory Technologies (YMTC) and ChangXin Memory Technologies. Sanctions were expanded to include Chinese companies such as drone maker DJI and genomics company BGI Genomics, among others. South Korean telecom companies trading with the PRC were partially excluded from the new restrictions.

On March 29, 2024, the Biden administration revised rules aimed at restricting China's access to US artificial intelligence (AI) chips and chipmaking tools, including those from Nvidia, as part of efforts to address national security concerns over Beijing's tech advancements potentially aiding its military. Following Washington's announcement of restrictions on China's ability to manufacture advanced chips, the Chinese government has notified the US of its intention to ban exports to the US of certain key components used in semiconductor manufacturing.

=== Second Trump administration ===
On February 1, 2025, Trump signed Executive Order 14195 to declare a national emergency regarding drug trafficking from China into the United States, alleging that the Chinese government was providing a “safe haven” for criminal organizations to “launder the revenues from the production, shipment, and sale of illicit synthetic opioids.” Using authority granted by national emergency and security related acts, Trump was able to tariff more quickly and broadly than in his first term. Trump first imposed a 10% tariff on Chinese imports, framing the move as a way of pressuring China into taking action on fentanyl, a drug central to the United States opioid crisis. On March 4, he raised this tariff to 20%. China responded to Trump's initial tariffs by imposing tariffs of 15% on coals and liquefied natural gas and 10% on oil and agricultural machines, adding PVH Corp. and Illumina to its unreliable entity list, launching an antitrust investigation into Google, and adding export controls to some metals including tungsten. After Trump increased the tariffs, China retaliated by imposing 10-15% tariffs on select agricultural, meat, and dairy products, launching an anti-circumvention investigation into optical fiber products imported from the United States. and suspending US lumber imports and revoked soybean import licenses for three US firms.

On April 2, 2025, the United States imposed a 34% duty on Chinese imports as part of his Liberation Day tariffs, which applied on top of the 20% "fentanyl tariff" and other prior measures. China responded by imposing a matching tariff of 34% on all American goods, suspending negotiations regarding the sale of TikTok and restricting exports of six heavy rare-earths and rare-earth magnets. Trump responded by raising tariffs by an additional 50% beginning April 9, bringing the baseline tariff on Chinese imports to 104%. China responded with a matching tariff of 50%, bringing its baseline tariff on American goods to 84%. The US then raised its tariffs to 145%, and China responded by raising its tariffs to 125%. On May 12, both countries reached a truce in a bid to reduce tensions. The US reduced tariffs on Chinese goods to 30% while China responded by reducing tariffs on US products to 10%.

In February 2026, the US Supreme Court struck down the tariffs the Trump administration implemented on imports from China under the International Emergency Economic Powers Act in Learning Resources v. Trump.

== Chronology ==
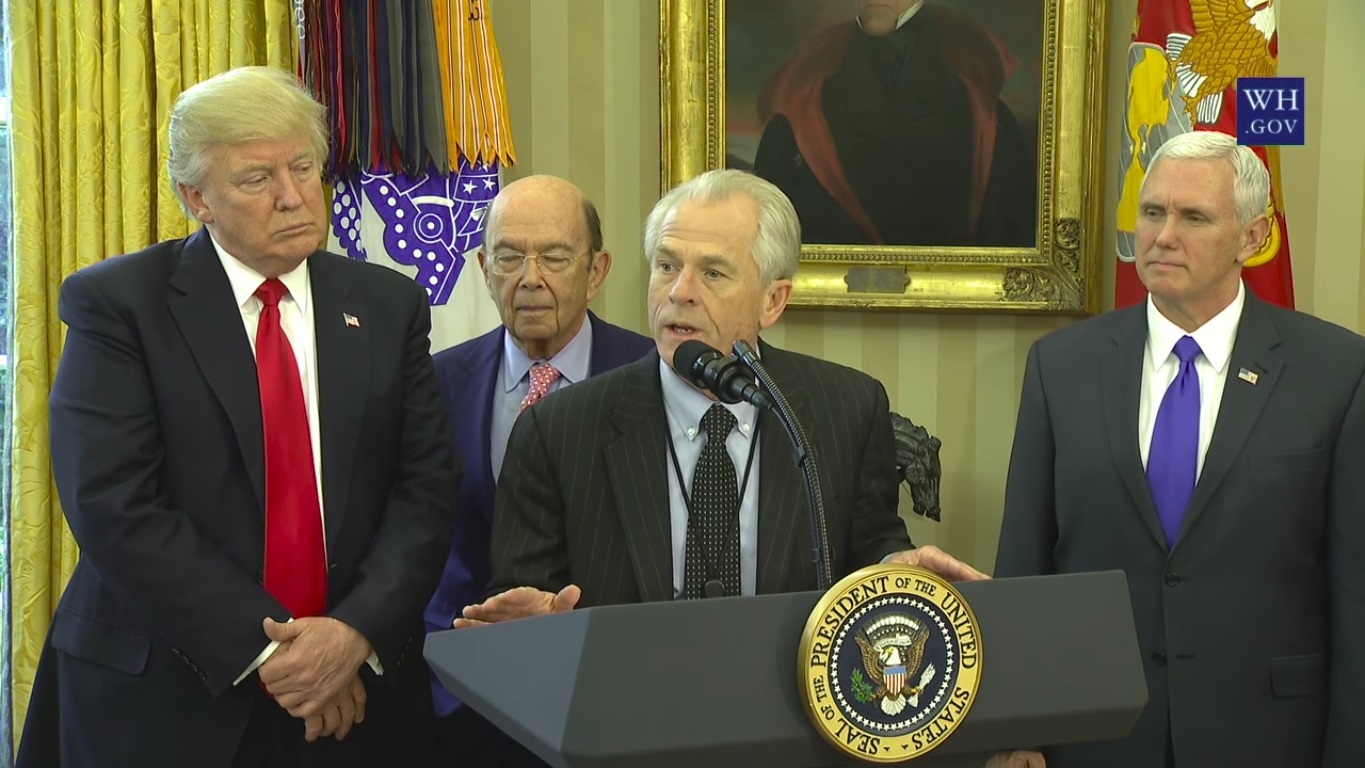
White House National Trade Council Director Peter Navarro speaks on trade with Vice President Mike Pence and Commerce Secretary Wilbur Ross before the President signs Executive Orders regarding trade.

=== 2018 ===
- January 22: Trump announced 20% to 50% tariffs on solar panels and washing machines. About 8% of American solar panel imports in 2017 came from China. Imports of residential washing machines from China totaled about $1.1 billion in 2015.
- March 1: Trump announced tariffs of 25% on steel and 10% on aluminum imports from all countries. The United States had imported about 3% of its steel from China. The announcement drew criticism from the editorial board of The Wall Street Journal, which called the executive order "the biggest policy blunder of his Presidency."
- March 22: Trump asked the United States trade representative (USTR) to investigate applying tariffs on US$50–60 billion worth of Chinese goods. He relied on Section 301 of the Trade Act of 1974 for doing so, stating that the proposed tariffs were "a response to the unfair trade practices of China over the years", including theft of US intellectual property. Over 1,300 categories of Chinese imports were listed for tariffs, including aircraft parts, batteries, flat-panel televisions, medical devices, satellites, and various weapons.
- April 2: Ministry of Commerce of China responded by imposing tariffs on 128 products it imports from America, including applying a 25% tariff to aluminum, airplanes, cars, pork, and soybeans, as well as applying a 15% tariff to fruit, nuts, and steel piping. US commerce secretary Wilbur Ross said that the planned Chinese tariffs only reflected 0.3% of US gross domestic product, and Press Secretary Sarah Huckabee Sanders stated that the moves would have "short-term pain" but bring "long-term success".
- April 3: The US Trade Representative's office published an initial list of 1,300+ Chinese goods to impose levies upon, including products like flat-screen televisions, weapons, satellites, medical devices, aircraft parts and batteries. Chinese Ambassador Cui Tiankai responded by warning the US that they may fight back, saying "We have done the utmost to avoid this kind of situation, but if the other side makes the wrong choice, then we have no alternative but to fight back."
- April 4: China's Customs Tariff Commission of the State Council decided to announce a plan of additional tariffs of 25% on 106 items of products including automobiles, airplanes, and soybeans. Soybeans are the top US agricultural export to China.
- April 5: Trump said that he was considering another round of tariffs on an additional $100 billion of Chinese imports as Beijing retaliates. The next day the World Trade Organization received request from China for consultations on new US tariffs.

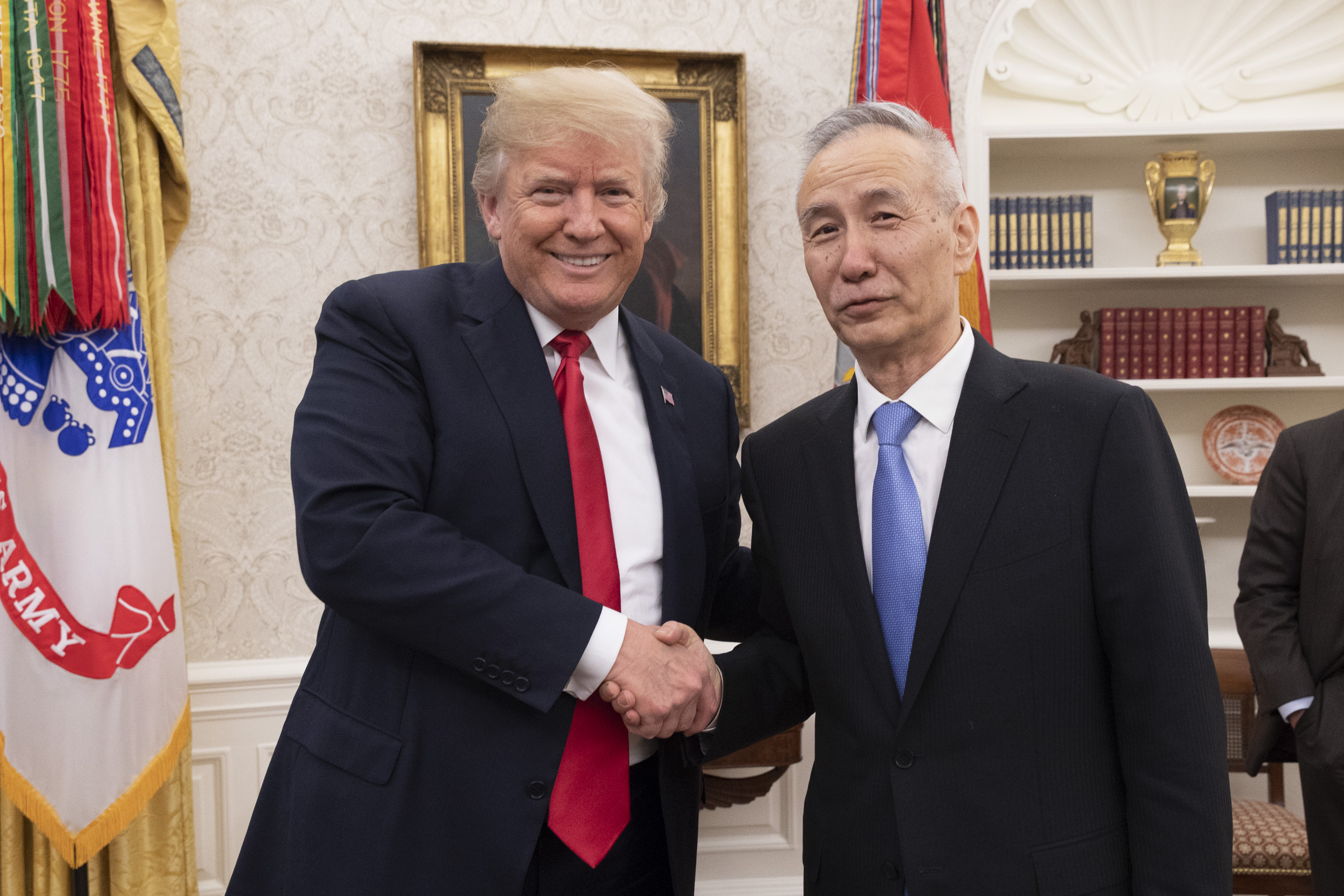
Chinese vice premier Liu He meeting with US president Donald Trump in May 2018

- May 9: China canceled soybean orders exported from United States to China. Zhang Xiaoping, Chinese director for the US Soybean Export Council, said Chinese buyers simply stopped buying from the US
- May 15: Vice Premier and CCP Politburo member Liu He, top economic adviser to president of China and CCP general secretary Xi Jinping, visited Washington for further trade talks.
- May 20: Chinese officials agreed to "substantially reduce" America's trade deficit with China by committing to "significantly increase" its purchases of American goods. As a result, Treasury Secretary Steven Mnuchin announced that "We are putting the trade war on hold". White House National Trade Council director Peter Navarro said there was no "trade war", rather a "trade dispute, fair and simple. We lost the trade war long ago."
- May 21: Trump tweeted that "China has agreed to buy massive amounts of Additional Farm/Agricultural Products," although he later clarified the purchases were contingent upon the closure of a "potential deal."
- May 29: The White House announced that it would impose a 25% tariff on $50 billion of Chinese goods with "industrially significant technology;" the full list of products affected to be announced by June 15. It also planned to impose investment restrictions and enhanced export controls on certain Chinese individuals and organizations to prevent them from acquiring US technology. China said it would discontinue trade talks with Washington if it imposed trade sanctions."
- June 15: Trump declared that the United States would impose a 25% tariff on $50 billion of Chinese exports. $34 billion would start July 6, 2018, with a further $16 billion to begin at a later date. China's Commerce Ministry accused the United States of launching a trade war and said China would respond in kind with similar tariffs for US imports, starting on July 6. Three days later, the White House declared that the United States would impose additional 10% tariffs on another $200 billion worth of Chinese imports if China retaliated against these US tariffs. The list of products included in this round of tariffs was released on July 11, 2018, and was set to be implemented within 60 days.
- June 19: China retaliates, threatening its own tariffs on $50 billion of US goods, and stating that the United States had launched a trade war. Import and export markets in a number of nations feared the tariffs would disrupt supply chains which could "ripple around the globe."
- July 6: American tariffs on $34 billion of Chinese goods came into effect. China imposed retaliatory tariffs on US goods of a similar value. The tariffs accounted for 0.1% of the global gross domestic product. On July 10, 2018, US released an initial list of the additional $200 billion of Chinese goods that would be subject to a 10% tariff. Two days later, China vowed to retaliate with additional tariffs on American goods worth $60 billion annually.
- August 8: The Office of the United States Trade Representative published its finalized list of 279 Chinese goods, worth $16 billion, to be subject to a 25% tariff from August 23. In response, China imposed 25% tariffs on $16 billion of imports from the US, which was implemented in parallel with the US tariffs on August 23.
- August 14: China filed a complaint with the World Trade Organization (WTO), stating that US tariffs on foreign solar panels clash with WTO ruling and have destabilized the international market for solar PV products. China stated that the resulting impact directly harmed China's legitimate trade interests. Peng Peng, a researcher with the China Renewable Energy Industry Association said that the solar problem has existed for years and thought that China chose to bring it up in order to keep up the rhythm of the trade dispute.
- August 22: US treasury undersecretary David Malpass and Chinese commerce vice-minister Wang Shouwen met in Washington, D.C. in a bid to reopen negotiations. Meanwhile, on August 23, 2018, the US and China's promised tariffs on $16 billion of goods took effect, and on August 27, 2018, China filed a new WTO complaint against the US regarding the additional tariffs.
- September 17: The US announced its 10% tariff on $200 billion worth of Chinese goods would begin on September 24, 2018, increasing to 25% by the end of the year. They also threatened tariffs on an additional $267 billion worth of imports if China retaliates, which China promptly did on September 18 with 10% tariffs on $60 billion of US imports. So far, China has either imposed or proposed tariffs on $110 billion of US goods, representing most of its imports of American products.
- November 10: White House National Trade Council director Peter Navarro alleged that a group of Wall Street billionaires are conducting an influence operation on behalf of the Chinese government by weakening the president and the US negotiating position, and urged them to invest in the rust belt.
- November 30: President Trump signed the revised US–Mexico–Canada Agreement in Buenos Aires, Argentina. The USMCA contains a "rules of origin" provision for automobile that was "touted by the Trump administration as a tool to keep out Chinese inputs and encourage production and investment in the US and North America."

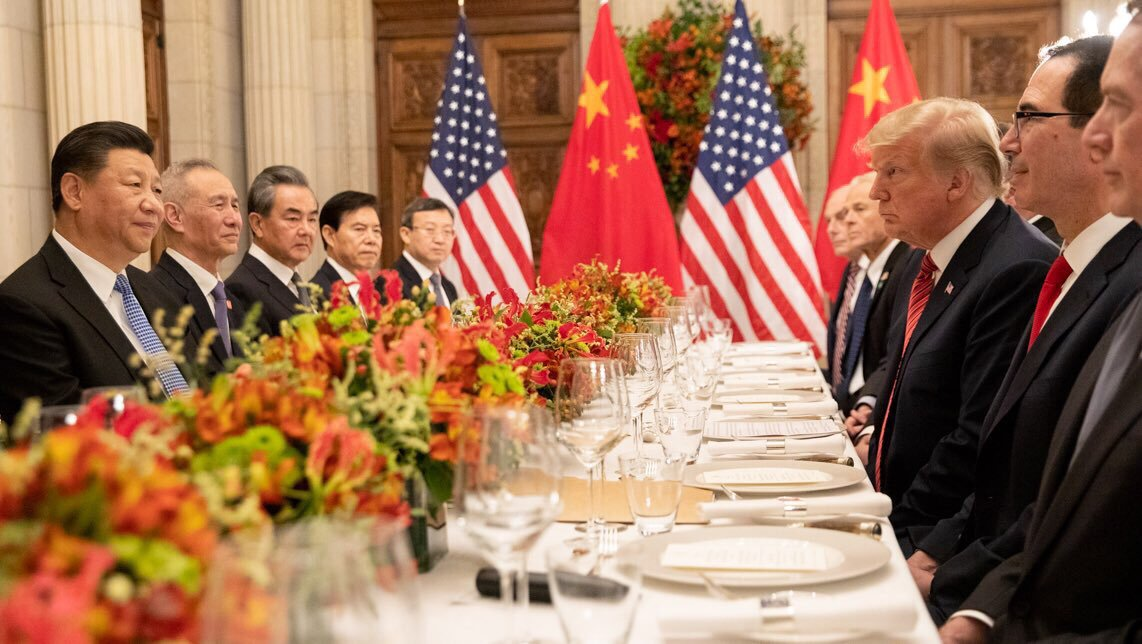
US President Donald Trump and Chinese leader Xi Jinping engaged in bilateral discussions during the G20 Buenos Aires summit on December 1, 2018.

- December 1: The planned increases in tariffs were postponed. The White House stated that both parties will "immediately begin negotiations on structural changes with respect to forced technology transfer, intellectual property protection, non-tariff barriers, cyber intrusions and cyber theft." According to the Trump administration, "If at the end of [90 days], the parties are unable to reach an agreement, the 10 percent tariffs will be raised to 25 percent." The US trade representative's office confirmed the hard deadline for China's structural changes is March 1, 2019.
- December 4: New York Fed president John Williams said that he believed the US economy will stay strong in 2019. Williams expects that increases in the interest rates will be necessary to maintain the economy. He stated, "Given this outlook of strong growth, strong labor market and inflation near our goal and taking account all the various risks around the outlook, I do expect further gradual increases in interest rates will best sponsor a sustained economic expansion."
- December 11: Trump announced China was buying a "tremendous amount" of US soybeans. Commodities traders saw no evidence of such purchases, and over the next six months soybean exports to China were about one quarter what they were in 2017, before the trade conflict began. China reportedly considered purchases of American farm goods as contingent upon closing a comprehensive trade deal.

=== 2019 ===
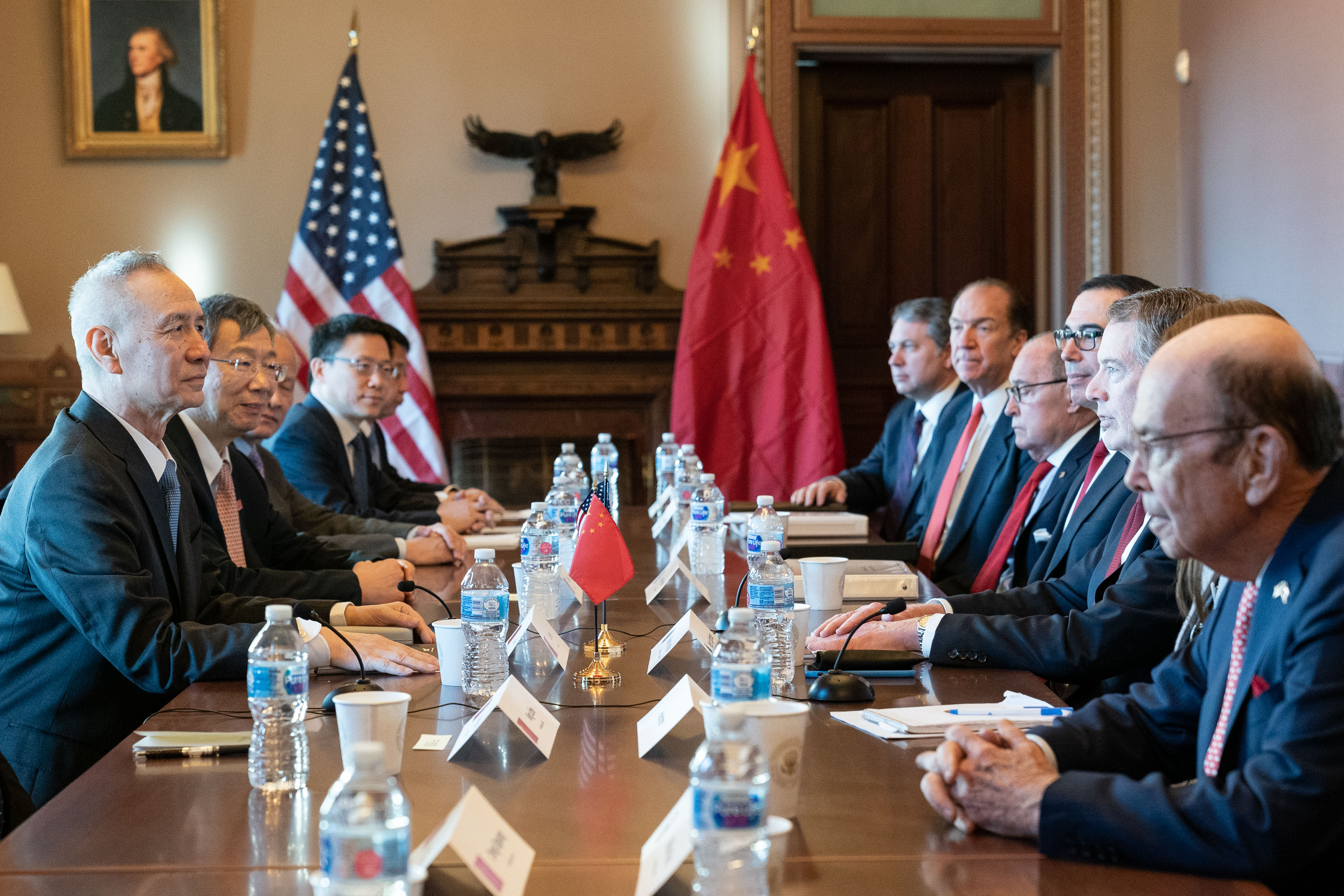
On January 30, 2019, Chinese Vice Premier Liu He conducted the fifth round of high-level trade negotiations with US Trade Representative Robert Lighthizer and US Treasury Secretary Steven Mnuchin.

- January 14: An article in The Wall Street Journal reports that in China's 2018 trade surplus with the United States was a record $323.32 billion despite Trump's tariffs.
- March 6: The US Department of Commerce stated that in 2018 the US' overall trade deficit reached $621 billion, the highest it had been since 2008.
- March 25: Macron and Xi signed 15 trade deals totaling 40 billion euros, including a €30 billion Airbus aircraft purchase, French chicken exports, a French-built offshore wind farm, a Franco-Chinese cooperation fund, and substantial co-financing commitments between BNP Paribas and the Bank of China. Rym Momtaz writing for Politico speculated that the deal would "ratchet up pressure on Trump" to make a deal with the Chinese government.

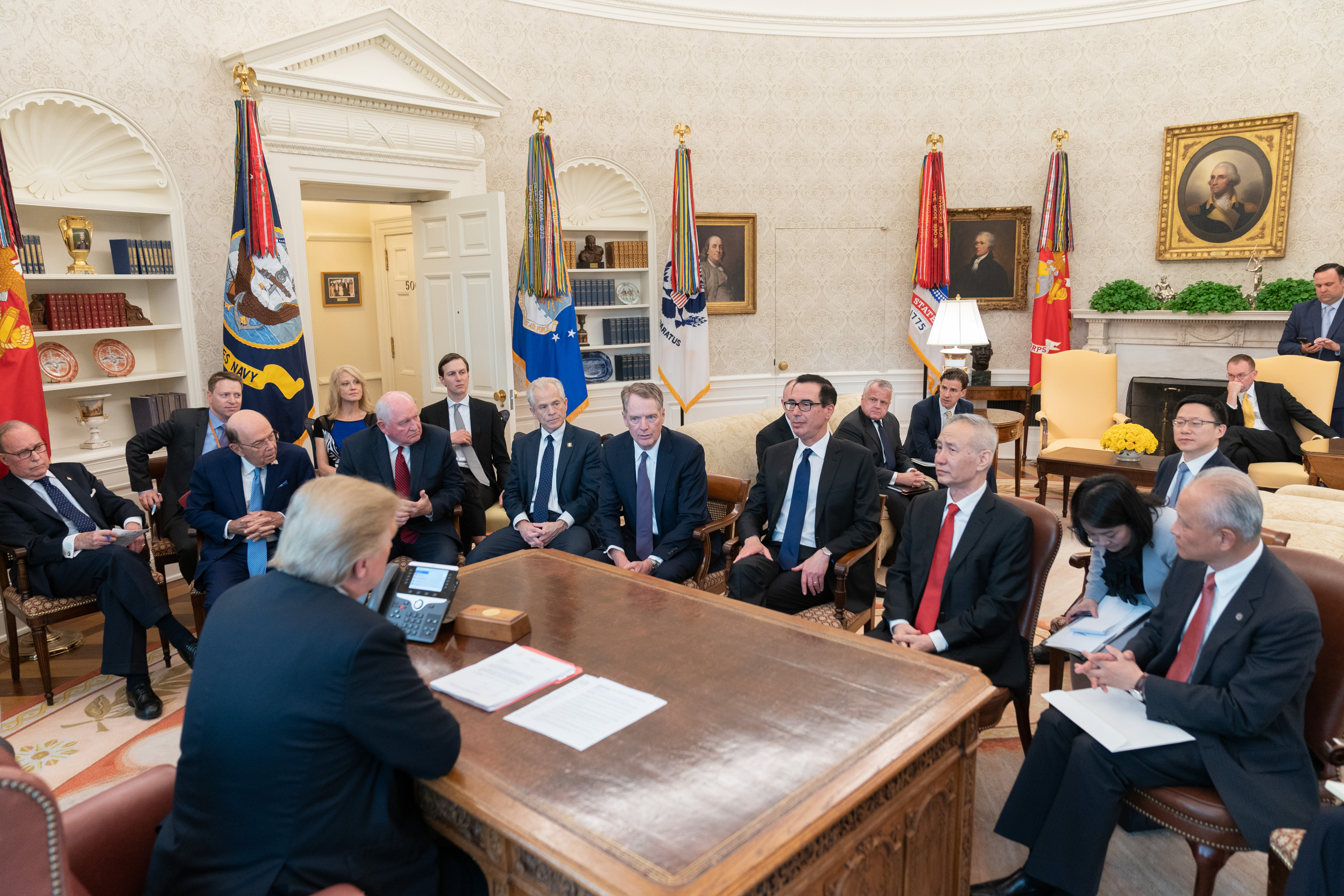
On April 4, 2019, US President Donald Trump hosted a delegation of US-China negotiators at the White House.

- May 5: Trump stated that the previous tariffs of 10% levied on $200 billion worth of Chinese goods would be raised to 25% on May 10. With notification by USTR, the Federal Register on May 9 published the modification of duty on or after 12:01 a.m. Eastern Time Zone May 10 to 25% for the products of China covered by the September 2018 action. The stated reason being that China reneged upon already agreed upon deals.
- May 9: Trump said the tariffs are "paid for mostly by China, by the way, not by us." Economic analysts concluded this was an incorrect assertion as American businesses and consumers ultimately pay the tariffs as real-world examples of tariffs working as intended are rare, and consumers of the tariff-levying country are the primary victims of tariffs, by having to pay higher prices. "It is inaccurate to say that countries pay tariffs on commercial and consumer goods – it is the buyers and sellers that bear the costs," said Ross Burkhart, a Boise State University political scientist. "Purchasers pay the tariff when they buy popular products. Sellers lose market share when their products get priced out of markets," Burkhart added.
- May 15: Trump signed executive order 13873, placing Huawei on the Department of Commerce's Entity List. According to Reuters, the move banned Huawei from buying vital parts and components from US companies without special approval and effectively barred its equipment from US telecom networks on national security grounds.
- June 1: China will raise tariffs on $60 billion worth of US goods.

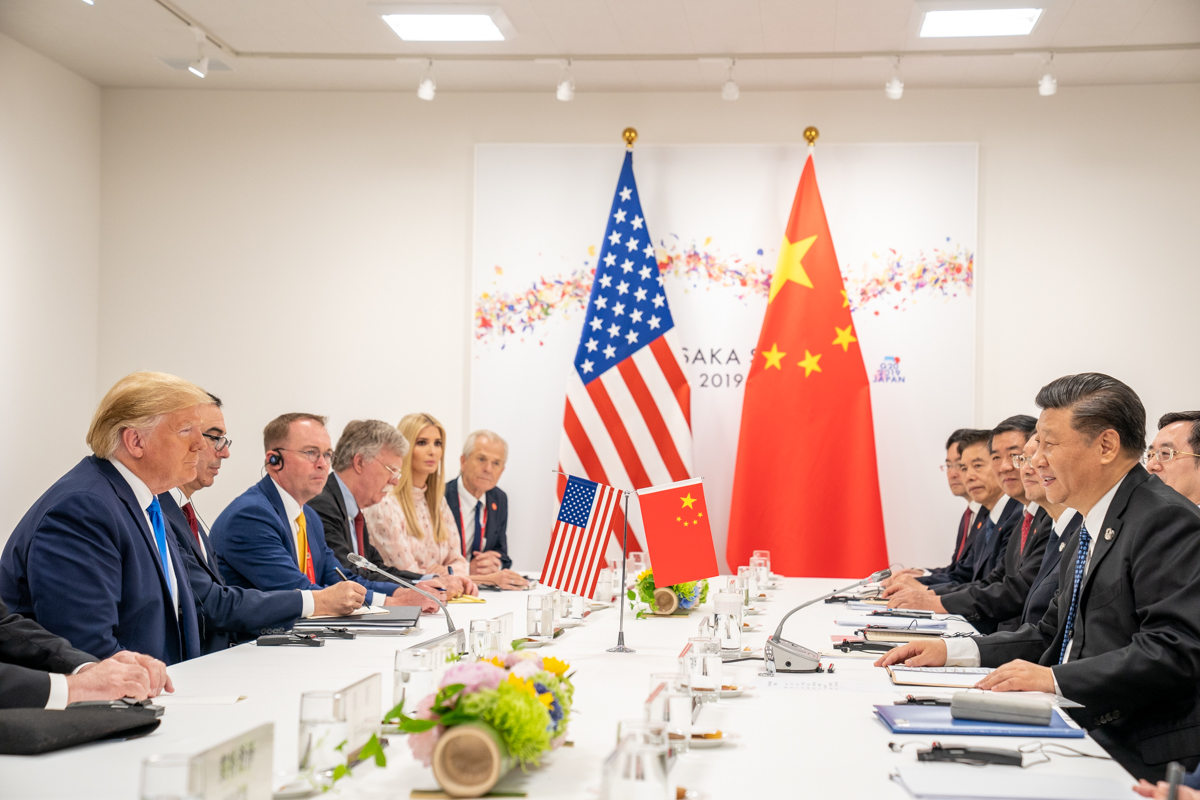
US President Donald Trump and Chinese leader Xi Jinping engaged in bilateral discussions during the G20 Osaka summit on June 29, 2019.

- June 29: During the G20 Osaka summit, Trump announces he and Xi Jinping agreed to a "truce" in the trade war after extensive talks. Prior tariffs are to remain in effect, but no future tariffs are to be enacted "for the time being" amid restarted negotiations. Additionally, Trump said he would allow American companies to sell their products to Huawei, but the company would remain on the US Entity List. The extent to which this plan to temporarily exempt Huawei from previous bans would be implemented later became unclear and, in the weeks later, there was no clear indication of the reversal of Huawei bans.
- June 29: After a meeting with Chinese leader Xi Jinping, Trump announces "China is going to be buying a tremendous amount of food and agricultural product, and they're going to start that very soon, almost immediately." China disputed making such a commitment and one month later no such purchases had materialized.
- July 11: Trump tweeted "China is letting us down in that they have not been buying the agricultural products from our great Farmers that they said they would." People familiar with the trade negotiations said China had made no firm commitments to purchase farm goods unless it was part of a comprehensive trade agreement.
- July 15: Official figures from China showed its second-quarter GDP growth at its slowest in 27 years.
- July 17: China announced an accelerated decrease in holdings of US treasury holdings, targeting 25% of its current holdings of $1.1 trillion.
- August 1: Trump announced on Twitter that additional 10% tariff will be levied on the "remaining $300 billion of goods".
- August 5: The central bank of China (PBOC) let the Renminbi fall over 2% in three days to the lowest point since 2008 as it was hit by strong sales due to the threat of tariffs.
- August 5: The US Department of Treasury officially declared China as a Currency Manipulator after the People's Bank of China allowed its yuan to depreciate that, according to CNN, was seen as retaliation to Trump's August 1 tariff announcement. According to an article in The Washington Post, Trump reportedly pressured the Treasury Department Steven Mnuchin to authorize the designation. Both the IMF and the Chinese government have rejected the designation, with the IMF saying that the valuation of the yuan are in line with China's economic fundamentals.
- August 5: China ordered state-owned enterprises to stop buying US agricultural products in retaliation to Trump's August 1 tariff announcement. Zippy Duvall, president of the American Farm Bureau Federation, called the move "a body blow to thousands of farmers and ranchers who are already struggling to get by," adding, "Farm Bureau economists tell us exports to China were down by $1.3 billion during the first half of the year. Now, we stand to lose all of what was a $9.1 billion market in 2018, which was down sharply from the $19.5 billion US farmers exported to China in 2017."
- August 13: Official figures from China showed its industrial output growth falling amid the trade war to a 17-year low.
- August 13: Trump delayed some of the tariffs. $112 billion worth will still take place on September 1 (which means that on September 1, $362 billion total worth, including the newly imposed $112 billion, of Chinese products will face a tariff), but the additional, not yet imposed, $160 billion will not take effect until December 15. Trump and his advisors Peter Navarro, Wilbur Ross and Larry Kudlow said that the tariffs were postponed to avoid harming American consumers during the Christmas shopping season.
- August 23: Chinese Ministry of Finance announced new rounds of retaliative tariffs on $75 billion worth of US goods, effective beginning September 1.
- August 23: Trump tweeted that he "hereby ordered" American companies to "immediately start looking for an alternative to China". According to an article in The New York Times, Trump's aides said that no order had been drawn up nor was it clear one would be. In a tweet on the following day, Trump said that he had the authority to make good on his threat, citing the International Emergency Economic Powers Act of 1977. Furthermore, tariffs are to be raised from 25% to 30% on the existing $250 billion worth of Chinese goods beginning on October 1, 2019, and from 10% to 15% on the remaining $300 billion worth of goods beginning on December 15, 2019.
- August 26: At the G7 summit, Trump stated, "China called last night our top trade people and said 'let's get back to the table' so we will be getting back to the table and I think they want to do something. They have been hurt very badly but they understand this is the right thing to do and I have great respect for it." Chinese Foreign Ministry spokesman Geng Shuang said he was unaware of such a call and Trump aides later said the call did not occur but the president was trying to project optimism.
- August 28: Americans for Free Trade, an umbrella group for 161 trade associations across numerous industries, sent Trump a letter asking him to postpone all scheduled tariff increases. The next day, Trump said "badly run and weak companies are smartly blaming these small Tariffs instead of themselves for bad management."
- September 1: New US and Chinese tariffs previously announced went into effect at 12:01 pm EST. China imposed 5% to 10% tariffs on one-third of the 5,078 goods it imports from America, with tariffs on the remainder scheduled for December 15. The United States imposed new 15% tariffs on about $112 billion of Chinese imports, such that more than two-thirds of consumer goods imported from China were then subject to tariffs.
- September 4: The Office of the US Trade Representative and Chinese state media confirmed that deputy-level meetings in mid-September would lead to ministerial-level talks in coming weeks. At the same time, the United States Department of Commerce issued preliminary antidumping duty determinations on fabricated structural steel from Canada, China, and Mexico. Furthermore, China was found liable for dumping up to 141.38% of fabricated structural steel into the United States and thereby prompted the US Customs and Border Protection to collect cash deposits in the same rate, as instructed by the Commerce Department.
- September 6: The People's Bank of China announces a 0.5% reduction in its reserve requirement ratio in response to the slowing of China's economic growth rates caused by the trade war.
- September 11: After China announced it was exempting 16 American product types from tariffs for one year, Trump announced he would delay until October 15 a tariff increase on Chinese goods previously scheduled for October 1. Trump asserted he granted the delay at the request of Chinese vice premier Liu He.
- September 12: Bloomberg News and Politico reported that Trump advisors were increasingly concerned that the trade war was weakening the American economy going into the 2020 election campaign and were discussing ways to reach a limited interim deal. The Wall Street Journal reported China was seeking to narrow the scope of negotiations to place national security matters on a separate track from trade issues.
- September 13: China eliminated its tariff increase on soybeans, which it had imposed in 2018.
- September 26: The Wall Street Journal reported that Chinese retaliatory tariffs on lumber and wood products had caused hardwood lumber exports to China to fall 40% during 2019, resulting in American lumber mills slashing employment. A USDA spokesperson said the organization had provided the industry $5 million in aid through its Agricultural Trade Promotion Program.
- October 7: Citing human rights issues, the United States Department of Commerce puts 20 Chinese public security bureaus and eight high tech companies, such as HikVision, SenseTime and Megvii, on the Export Administration Regulations Entity List. Like Huawei, which was sanctioned on an identical blueprint for national security reasons, the entities will need US government approval before they can purchase components from US companies.

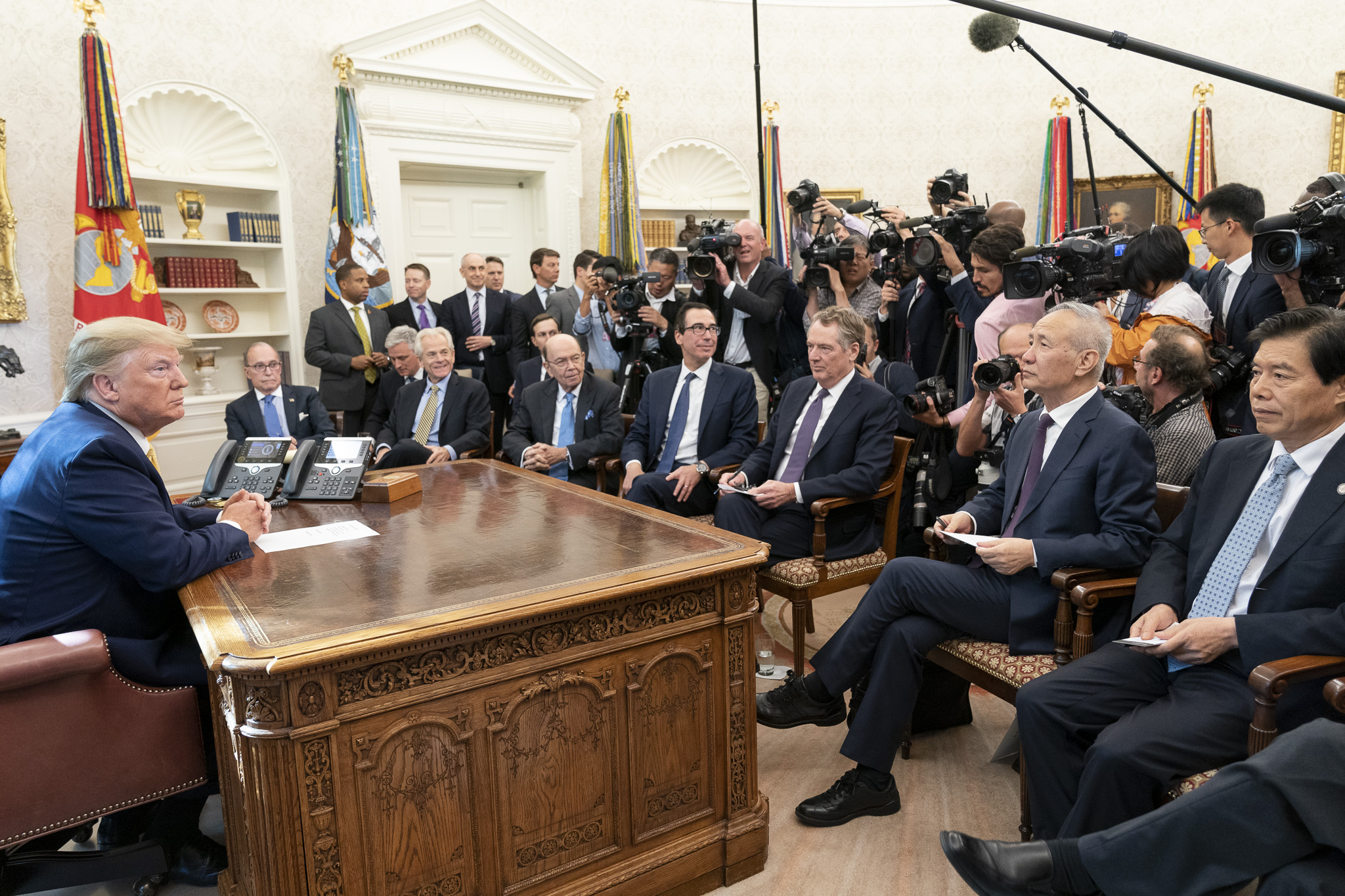
On October 11, 2019, US President Donald Trump hosted a delegation of US-China negotiators at the White House.

- October 11: Trump announced that the United States and China had reached a tentative agreement for the "first phase" of a trade deal, with China agreeing to buy up to $50 billion in American farm products, and to accept more American financial services in their market, with the United States agreeing to suspend new tariffs scheduled for October 15. The deal was expected to be finalized in coming weeks. At the same time, Chinese announcements did not express the same confidence, though a few days later the Chinese Foreign Ministry said that the two sides had the same understanding and had reached an agreement.
- October 17: Official figures from China showed its third quarter GDP growth at its slowest in almost 30 years.
- December: Media reports indicated that China had ordered government agencies and public institutions to remove foreign computer equipment and software within three years, following a "3-5-2" replacement strategy. While not officially confirmed, this move was seen as part of the ITAI initiative. Increased funding and policy support were directed towards domestic IT companies to accelerate the development of homegrown technologies.
- December 13: Both countries announce an initial deal where new tariffs to be mutually imposed on December 15 would not be implemented. China says it "will increase purchases of high-quality agricultural products from the US", while the United States says it will halve the existing 15% tariffs.
- December 31: The Wall Street Journal reported that the language of the phase one deal was expected to be released after the January 15 signing, and that Lighthizer said some details would be classified.

=== 2020 ===
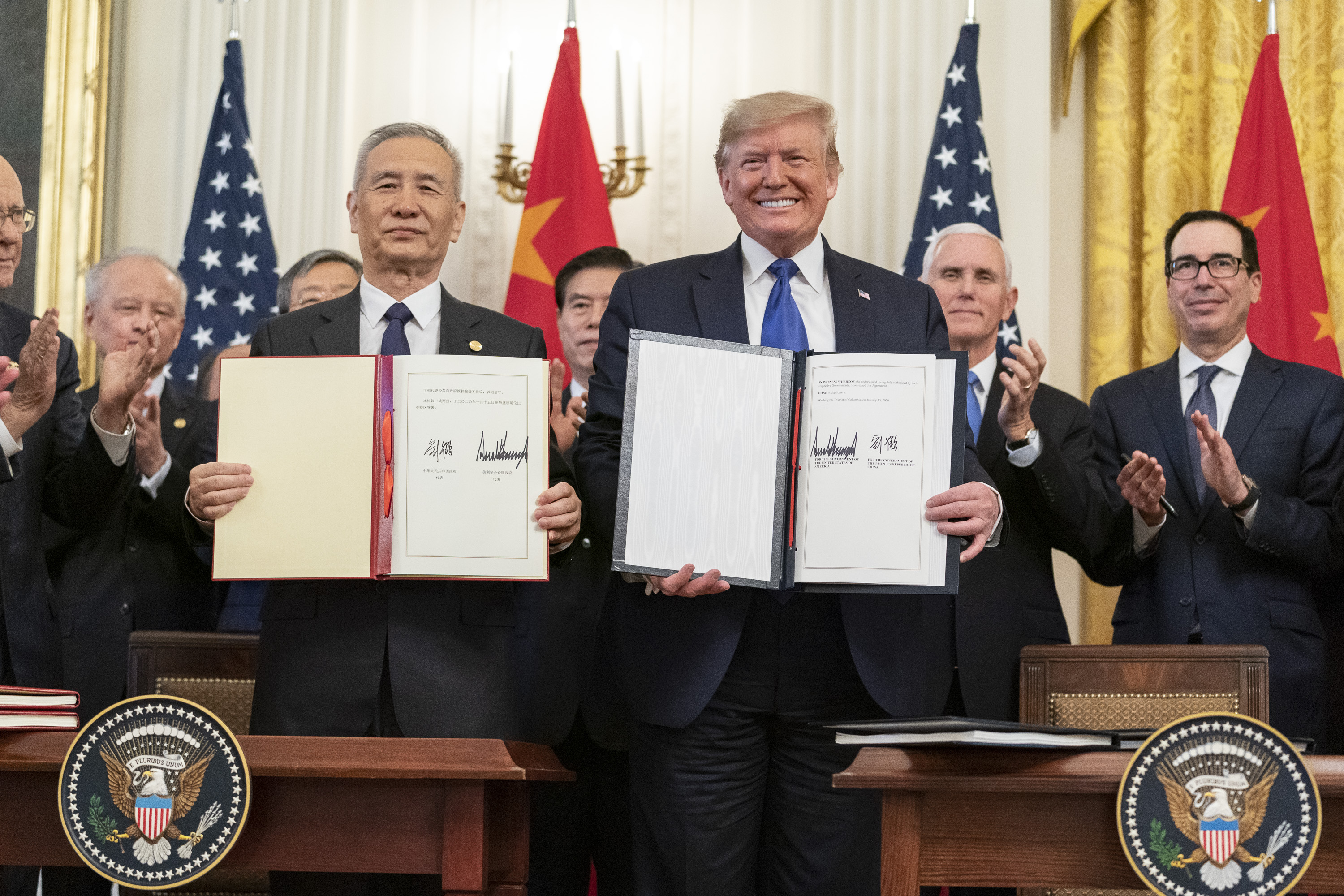
Trump and Liu sign the Phase One Trade Deal in January 2020.

- January 3: Reuters reported that in December 2019 the American manufacturing sector fell into its deepest slump in over a decade, attributing the decline to the US-China trade war.
- January 15: US President Donald Trump and China's Vice Premier Liu He signed the US–China Phase One trade deal in Washington DC. The "Economic and Trade Agreement between the United States of America and the People's Republic of China" is set to take effect from February 14, 2020, and focuses on intellectual property rights (Chapter 1), technology transfer (Chapter 2), food and agricultural products (Chapter 3), financial services (Chapter 4), exchange rate matters and transparency (Chapter 5), and expanding trade (Chapter 6), with reference also being made to bilateral evaluation and dispute resolution procedures in Chapter 7. The agreement allows for a party to request additional consultation in the event of a "natural disaster or other unforeseeable event." Unlike other trade agreements, the US–China Phase One agreement did not rely on arbitration through an intergovernmental organization like the World Trade Organization, but rather through a bilateral mechanism.
- January 17: Official figures from China showed its 2019 economic growth rate falling amid the trade war to a 30-year low.
- February 5: Data from the Commerce Department of the United States showed the country's trade deficit falling amid the trade war for the first time in 6 years.
- February 17: China grants tariff exemptions on 696 US goods to support purchases.
- March 5: The United States Trade Representative granted exemptions to tariffs on various types of medical equipment, after calls from American lawmakers and others to remove tariffs on these products in light of the COVID-19 pandemic in the United States.
- May 12: The Chinese government announced exemptions for tariffs on 79 additional US goods.
- May 14: The Chinese government announced that it would permit imports of barley and blueberries from the United States.
- As of June, China had risen to become the United States' top trading partner again, amid the global crisis caused by the COVID-19 pandemic. However, the countries were on track to miss the targets from the trade deal, hitting which would have been hard even under strong economic conditions, according to Chad Brown of the Peterson Institute for International Economics and Chenjun Pan of Rabobank. The economic damage and barriers to trade caused by the pandemic made those targets even harder to reach.
- September 15: A three-person WTO panel found that the Trump administration tariffs violated global trade rules because they had been applied only to China and they exceeded the maximum rates the US had agreed to, without adequate explanation. Lighthizer responded that the finding showed "the WTO is completely inadequate to stop China's harmful technology practices."
- September 26: The US Commerce Department imposed restrictions on China's largest chip maker, Semiconductor Manufacturing International Corporation (SMIC), determining that an "unacceptable risk" equipment supplied to SMIC could potentially be used for military purposes. Under the restrictions, the suppliers were barred from exporting the chip without a license.
- November 8: President Donald Trump signed an executive order prohibiting Americans from investing in shares of companies with ties to the Chinese military. New transactions would be barred from January 11, 2021, while investors that already held such stocks would have until November 2021 to divest them. On January 6, 2021, the New York Stock Exchange announced that it would delist stocks related to China Mobile, China Telecom and China Unicom. Index provider MSCI also announced it would stop including China Mobile, China Telecom and China Unicom in its benchmarks.
- By the end of 2020, China and the US had achieved only 58% of targets for US exports to China under the phase one trade agreement. This was seen as a sign that the original targets were unrealistic. The US-based Peterson Institute for International Economics said China had "failed spectacularly" to meet its import targets and "much of the deal was a failure."

=== 2021 ===
- January 13: The Trump administration banned cotton and tomato products originating in Xinjiang, including products manufactured outside of China but using cotton and tomatoes from Xinjiang, over forced labor allegations.
- January 20: Trump's first term expired and Joe Biden was inaugurated as president of the United States. Biden said that he did not have immediate plans to remove the tariffs and planned to review the phase one trade deal and discuss the matter with allies first.
- January 20: China imposed sanctions against outgoing US Secretary of State Mike Pompeo, former secretary of health and human services Alex Azar, former under secretary of state Keith J. Krach, outgoing US ambassador to the United Nations Kelly Craft, and 24 other former Trump officials. Biden's National Security Council called the sanctions "unproductive and cynical."
- February 22: China's Foreign Minister Wang Yi called for US President Joe Biden to lift the multiple restrictions imposed by Trump. During a Foreign Ministry forum on US-China relations, he urged the Biden administration to lift the sanctions on trade and people-to-people contact, while asking it to stop interfering in China's internal affairs.

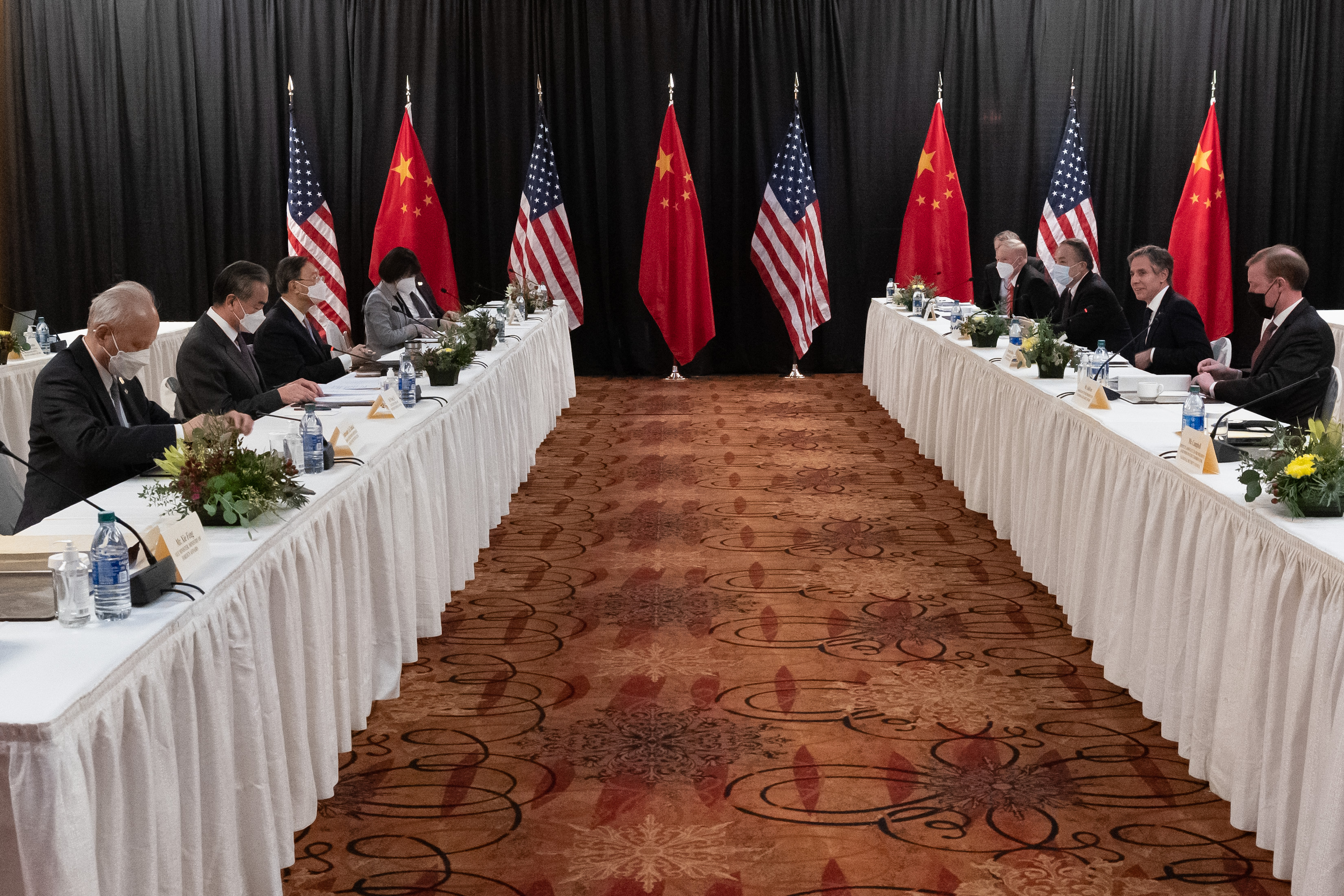
The United States–China talks in Alaska represent the inaugural face-to-face meeting of senior officials of the US and China since President Joe Biden assumed office.

- March 18–19: High level talks took place in Anchorage, Alaska to discuss key geopolitical disagreements.
- March: The 14th Five-Year Plan (2021–2025) was released emphasizing technological self-reliance and innovation as national priorities, reinforcing ITAI objectives across various sectors, including healthcare.
- In May and June 2021, discussions continued between high-level officials, including Liu He and Wang Wentao from China and Katherine Tai, Janet Yellen, and Gina Raimondo from the United States. The Chinese Ministry of Commerce described the talks as candid, productive, and pragmatic, while Tai and Yellen said they looked forward to further dialogue.

=== 2022 ===
- December 9: The WTO ruled that former US President Donald Trump was in breach of global trade rules in 2018 with his administration's tariffs on steel and aluminum. The Biden administration however disputed the panel's rulings and instead stated that they will not take away the duties that Trump had earlier established. Brussels had criticized the US for having rejected the WTO ruling. Bernd Lange, chairperson of the European Parliament's international trade committee, stated, "The USA's reaction of simply rejecting the ruling is incomprehensible. We have to have an honest discussion with the US if they are moving away from a rules-based trading system, and if and how we can rescue the existing system."
- December 21: WTO ruled that the US was in breach of global trading rules for having claimed that products imported from Hong Kong, can be marked as coming from China. Hong Kong's government welcomed the ruling and its secretary for commerce and economic development, Algernon Yau, stated that "the revised origin marking requirement is politically motivated" and "a vain attempt to interfere with Hong Kong's internal affairs through weaponising trade". The US rejected the ruling and expressed that they had no intentions in abiding. The United States Trade Representative spokesperson Adam Hodge stated the US responded to "highly concerning actions" by China to erode Hong Kong's autonomy and the democratic and human rights of its people, and so qualified to be a threat to the national security of the US. However, the WTO panel had disagreed that tensions between United States and Hong Kong have increased to being an "emergency in international relations", which is the threshold required to qualify for an exception.

=== 2023 ===
- January 27: European Commissioner for Internal Market Thierry Breton announced that the European Union will join the United States in blocking the sale of technology to China that would allow it to produce advanced semiconductor chips.
- February 17: China expands Unreliable Entities List to include Raytheon and Lockheed Martin.
- June 18–19: US Secretary of State Antony Blinken visits China, the first secretary of state to visit China since 2018. Blinken met with Chinese Foreign Minister Qin Gang, CCP Foreign Affairs Commission Office Director Wang Yi and CCP General Secretary Xi Jinping. Blinken sought to clarify the economic stance of the United States toward China, saying "We are for de-risking and diversifying" and emphasize that the US is not seeking to contain China economically. Yang Tao, director-general of the Chinese Foreign Ministry's North American and Oceanian Affairs department, rejected his explanation, telling reporters that the US is simply repackaging "decoupling" as "de-risking" from China.
- July 7: The US Treasury Secretary, Janet Yellen criticized China's restrictions during her visit to Beijing, citing her concern over China's crackdown on US consulting firms and export controls on critical minerals used in computer chip manufacturing. She stressed that the US's goal is to expand its economic partnership with China, rather than sever it.

=== 2024 ===
- May 14: The Biden administration doubled tariffs on solar cells imported from China and more than tripled tariffs on lithium-ion electric vehicle batteries imported from China. It also raised tariffs on imports of Chinese steel, aluminum, and medical equipment. The tariff increases will be phased in over a period of three years.
- September 13: The Biden administration finalized the increases of tariffs on Chinese exports. Tariffs increased to 100% on electric vehicles, 50% on solar cells and 25% on electric vehicle batteries, critical minerals, steel, and aluminum. The tariffs took effect beginning on September 27, 2024.
- December: Following China's escalating conflict with the United States over trade, Chinese manufacturers have recently restricted sales of key components used in drone construction to the United States.
- December 10: China launched an investigation against Nvidia due to alleged violations of anti-monopoly laws.

=== 2025 ===
- January 20: Biden's term expired and Donald Trump was re-inaugurated for a nonconsecutive second term as president of the United States.
- February 1: President Trump increased tariffs on China by 10%.
- February 4: China responded with a 15% tariff on coal and liquified natural gas products, and 10% on crude oil, agricultural machinery and large-displacement cars. China also added PVH Corp. and Illumina to the Unreliable Entity List, launched an antitrust investigation into Google, and added export controls to some metals including tungsten.
- March 3: President Trump raised levies on Chinese goods by another 10% to a cumulative 20%. He also implemented new 25% tariffs on imports from Mexico and Canada, thereby initiating new trade disputes with the three primary US trading partners.
- March 4: China retaliated by imposing a 15% tariff on chicken, wheat, corn, and cotton originating in the United States; and a 10% tariff on sorghum, soybeans, pork, beef, aquatic products, fruits, vegetables, and dairy products originating in the United States, effective on March 10, 2025.
- March 30: China, South Korea, and Japan's trade ministers met for the first time in five years. The officials discussed goals for a trilateral free trade agreement and enhanced supply-chain cooperation in response to Trump tariffs.
- April 2: Trump raised the tariffs on China by another 34%, after accusing China of tariff and non-tariff trade barriers of 67% as part of his reciprocal tariffs policy, expressed during his "Liberation Day" speech. The White House confirmed tariffs would stack on top of previous impositions, resulting in an effective tariff rate of 54% on all Chinese imports to the US beginning in one week.
- April 4: China announced that it would impose additional tariffs of 34% on all US goods effective April 10.
- April 7: Trump threatened to impose an additional 50% tariff on Chinese goods on April 9 if China did not withdraw its retaliatory measure of a 34% tariff on all US goods by April 8. This would boost the effective 54% tariffs on China on April 9 to 104%.
- April 9: China responded with retaliatory tariffs of 84% on US goods. In response, Trump increased tariffs on Chinese goods to 125% on the same day. However, the White House clarified the next day that the tariff rate had risen to 145%.
- April 11: China, in retaliation, announced an increase in tariffs on all American imports from the previous 84% to 125%, set to take effect on April 12.
- April 11: The US announces reciprocal tariffs will exclude consumer electronics from tariffs from most countries, but retains a 20% tariff on electronics from China.
- April 11: China suspended exports of a wide range of minerals and magnets critical to auto, defense, aerospace, and semiconductor industries; the Chinese government plans to introduce a new regulatory system to prevent access to American companies.
- April 17: The US published a fact sheet indicating that total tariffs on certain goods from China reach up to 245%.
- April 24: China begins researching and exempting certain US exports from tariffs, including aerospace equipment parts and certain microchips. Chinese companies were asked to notify the government of US goods that they could not procure elsewhere.
- May 2: the US ends de minimis treatment for low-value imports from China and Hong Kong.

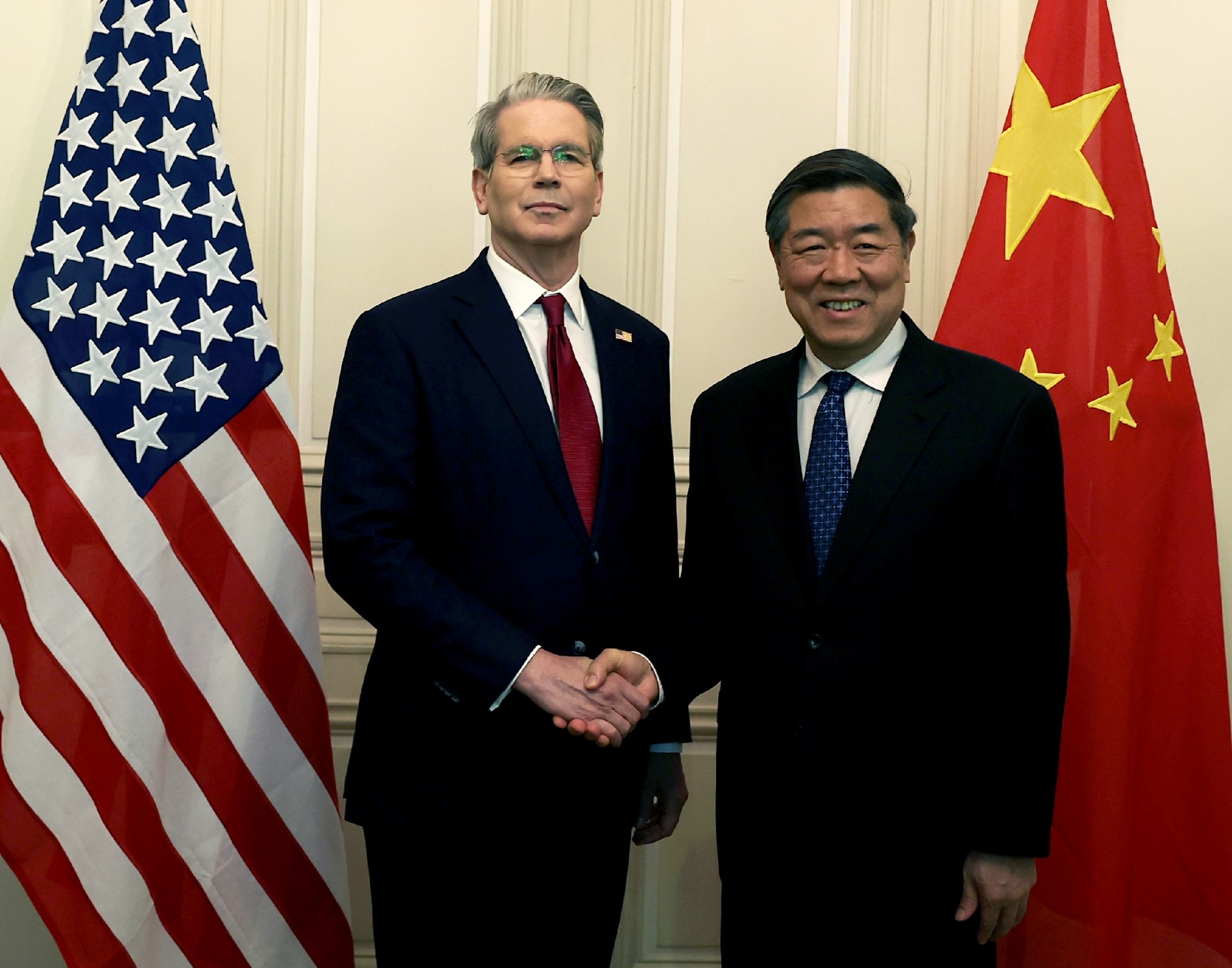
US Secretary of Treasury Scott Bessent with China's Vice Premier He Lifeng, during US-China trade talks in Geneva, Switzerland in May 2025

- May 12: The United States and China reach an agreement to reduce tariffs in an effort to de-escalate trade tensions. The US agreed to cut tariffs on Chinese goods to 30%, while China reciprocated with tariff reductions on US products to 10%. Both sides agreed to assess the situation after 90 days. The agreement was preceded by talks between senior US and Chinese officials side the day before in Switzerland.
- May 28: Secretary of State Marco Rubio announces the US will begin "aggressively" revoking the visas of Chinese students attending US universities.
- June 11: The White House announces the trade deal with China is "done". Baseline tariffs were sustained at 10% by China and 30% by the US. The US agreed to resume accepting Chinese students and China agreed to resume shipments of rare earths. China downplayed the deal as a framework representing the "first meeting".
- July 2: The Trump administration announced a preliminary trade pact with Vietnam that includes a 20 percent tariff on Vietnamese exports, lower than what was previously threatened by US president Donald Trump. The deal also imposes a 40 percent tariff on transshipments, targeting China's efforts to avoid US tariffs.
- July 3: The US lifted its restrictions on their chip design software and ethane exports to China in order to de-escalate trade tensions.
- July 4: The Trump administration plans to restrict AI chip shipments to Thailand and Malaysia due to concerns of smuggling into China. The draft on export control by the US Commerce Department was created amidst a rise of AI shipments in Malaysia and concerns over American data centre projects, especially those backed by the Oracle Corp.
- July 28–29: The two day US-China trade talks was held in Stockholm, Sweden over which it seeks to extend their 90-day tariff truce. However, no major announcement was made. According to China's trade negotiator Li Chenggang, both countries have agreed for the preservation of the truce. US Treasury Secretary Scott Bessent, meanwhile, stated that such extension would have to be approved by US President Trump.
- August 11: President Trump announced that the United States would extend their trade truce another 90 days to ease trade tensions with China after the international tariffs that went into effect. The US withhold the imposition of their import duties until November 10. Similarly, China's commerce ministry also paused its additional tariffs on US goods.
- September 12: The US Department of Commerce added 23 Chinese companies to its restricted trade list.
- September 13: China launched an anti-dumping probe into analog integrated circuit chips imported from the US and an anti-discrimination probe into US measures against China's chip sector.
- September 15: China accused the American AI chip maker Nvidia of violating anti-monopoly laws. The Financial Times reported on September 17 that the Cyberspace Administration of China had ordered their domestic technology companies, including ByteDance and Alibaba, to stop testing Nvidia's RTX Pro 6000D as the country imposed restrictions on Nvidia's chips. China's market regulator issued a statement explaining that a preliminary probe was conducted into Nvidia's business practices.
- September 29: The US Department of Commerce updated its Entity List to require automatic inclusion of subsidiaries with an ownership stake of 50% or more held by an entity on the list, known as the Affiliates Rule. Analyst believed this could trigger a similar regulatory response from China.
- October 9: The Chinese Ministry of Commerce (MOFCOM) imposed jurisdiction on "specific export operators" that require a license from China to export and re-export rare earth materials. China's rule closely resembles the United States Affiliates Rule.
- October 10: President Donald Trump announced the imposition of 100% levies on Chinese imports along with new export controls effective November 1. The directive was made in response to China's decision to expand its rare earth element export controls.
- October 14: China imposed sanctions on five US-linked subsidiaries of South Korea's Hanwha Ocean, citing national sovereignty and security concerns; the move came in response to US port fees on China-linked vessels, and prompted market disruptions and diplomatic tensions.

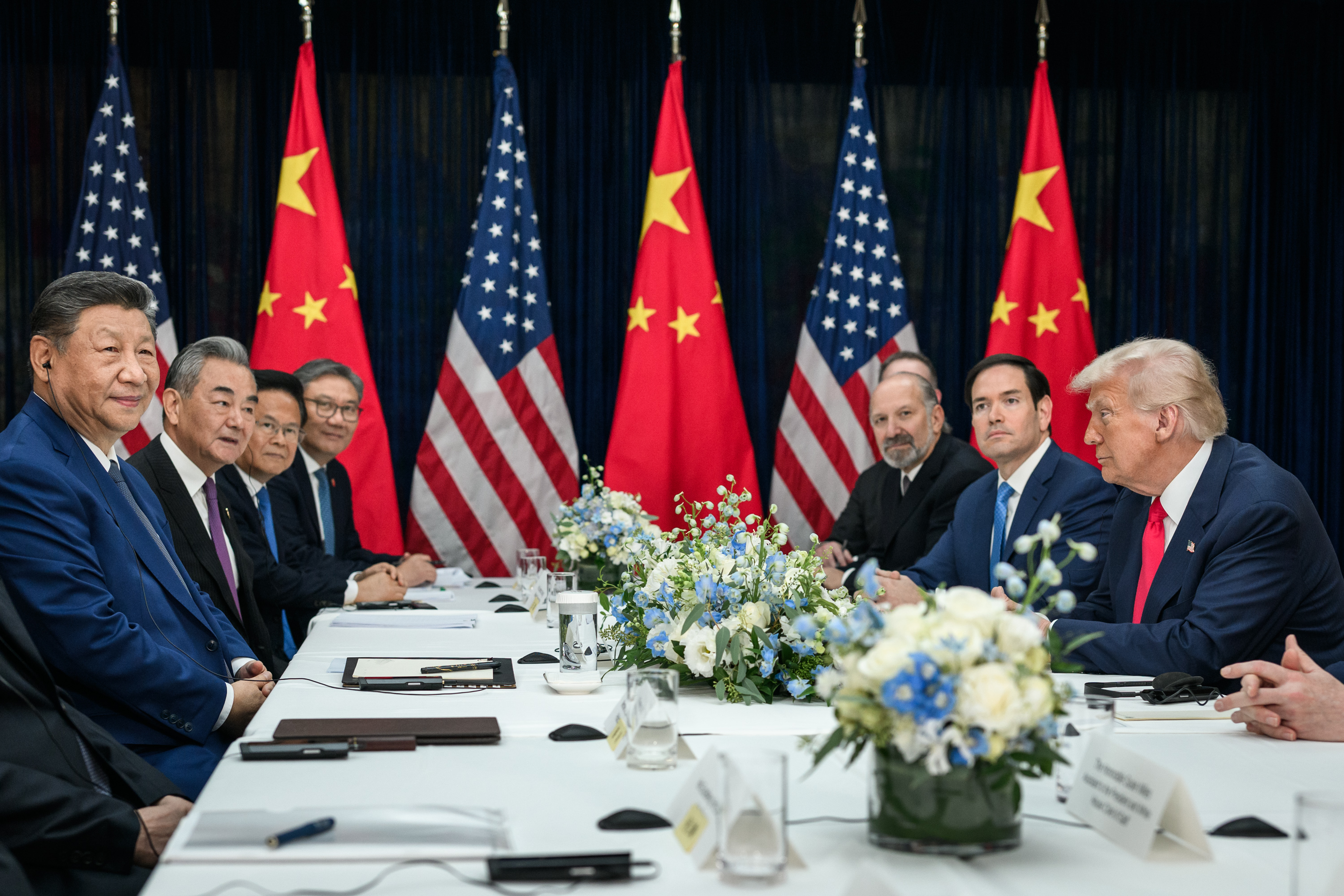
US President Donald Trump and Chinese leader Xi Jinping engaged in bilateral discussions during the Busan summit on October 30, 2025.

- October 30: President Donald Trump and Chinese leader Xi Jinping have met during the Busan summit in Busan, South Korea. Both the US and China conducted their trade talks there resulting with the United States reducing their fentanyl tariffs on Chinese imports by 10%. China, in response, agreed to make necessary adjustments on their tariffs on US goods and suspend its rare earth exports restrictions for one year. Similarly, the US also agreed to suspend the expansion of its Entity List which include Chinese companies and Trump's 24% reciprocal tariffs for a year according to the statement released by China.

=== 2026 ===
- June 9: the US added Alibaba and other companies (Baidu, BYD) to its list of Chinese military companies, which indicates that there may be restrictions on US defense-related contracting for these companies. Reuters had reported earlier in 2026 that Alibaba had been expected to appear on the list and that the designation is meant to warn suppliers and government buyers rather than be a complete business ban. Alibaba denied the labeling, explaining that it is not a military enterprise and would challenge the designation. They termed it as discriminatory and an example of the US overstretching their concept of national security. A company spokesman explained that Alibaba is not a "Chinese military company nor part of any military civil-fusion strategy." Under the 2026 Section 1260H list the Pentagon described Alibaba as indirectly affiliated with SASAC under statutory criteria along with ties to the MIIT. SASAC is the State-owned Assets Supervision and Administration Commission of the State Council of China, a special ministerial‑level commission directly under the State Council while MIIT is Ministry of Industry and Information Technology. In June of 2026, Alibaba sued the US for accusations of being linked to the Chinese military.
- June 22: China had imposed trade restrictions on dozens of US companies, including two companies specializing in the production of rare earth minerals, after the US had reportedly blacklisted Chinese companies for having military links.
- July 24: The Trump administration had imposed tariffs on China over forced labour concerns.
- August 5: China had announced to impose trade restrictions on drone exports to the United States and blacklisted six US firms after the imposition of tariffs by the Trump administration. China's Commerce Ministry stated that the actions conducted by the US "seriously harm China’s legitimate rights and interests."
- September 20: Both China and the US conducted trade discussions headed by US Treasury Secretary Scott Bessent and China's Vice Premier He Lifeng. Bessent praised the talks as "very successful". US trade representative Jamieson Greer and China's chief trade negotiator Li Chenggang also attended the discussions.
- September 23: Following the trade discussions between Bessent and He, Bessent stated that China and the US had agreed to extend the trade truce by two months.

Donald and Melania Trump meeting with Xi Jinping and Peng Liyuan at the Oval Office

- September 26: During the state visit of Xi to the US, both China and the US agreed on tariff cuts covering US$30 billion of non-sensitive goods such as US exports of agricultural goods and cosmetics and US imports such as small appliances and toys.
- September 28: China announced plans to cut tariffs on a range of US agricultural products, including corn, wheat, sorghum, meat and dairy products, while excluding soybeans, which remained subject to an additional 10% tariff.

== Effects ==
A November 2019 United Nations analysis reported that "the US tariffs on China are economically hurting both countries". In the United States, it has led to higher costs for manufacturers, higher prices for consumers and financial difficulties for farmers. In China, the trade war contributed to a slowdown in the rate of economic and industrial output growth, which had already been declining. Many American companies have shifted supply chains to elsewhere in Asia, bringing fears that the trade war would lead to a US-China economic 'decoupling'. Subsequent academic work tracking firm disclosures identified 244 discrete relocation decisions by 141 manufacturers during 2018–2023; 66.4% were multi-country "China-plus-many" strategies, with Vietnam the single largest beneficiary (75 of 244 moves). The same study reports that geopolitical risk linked to the US–China confrontation and tariff increases were the most frequently cited rationales (164 and 163 out of 730 stated reasons, respectively), with a marked spike in 2019; it also estimates that relocations involved roughly 787,000 equivalent employees across destination countries. In contrast to political rhetoric, true reshoring remained limited in the period, accounting for only 38 of the 244 moves (15.6%).

The trade war has also caused economic damage in other countries, though some benefited from increased manufacturing as production was shifted to them. It also led to stock market instability. Governments around the world have taken steps to address some of the damage caused by the economic conflict.

By late 2019, the United States had imposed approximately US$350 billion in tariffs on Chinese imports, while China had imposed approximately US$100 billion on US exports.

The trade war has been leading to Techno-nationalism, and accelerated China's effort for indigenenous innovation. Studies show that US Entity List sanctions may have inadvertently accelerated Chinese firms' use of science in innovation, potentially strengthening the country's independent tech capabilities in the long run.

=== China ===
In April 2018, China announced that it would eliminate laws that required global automakers and shipbuilders to work through state-owned partners. Chinese leader Xi Jinping reiterated those pledges, affirming a desire to increase imports, lower foreign-ownership limits on manufacturing and expand protection to intellectual property, all central issues in Trump's complaints about their trade imbalance. Trump thanked Xi for his "kind words on tariffs and automobile barriers" and "his enlightenment" on intellectual property and technology transfers. "We will make great progress together!" the president added.

As a response to the trade war, China increased the personal income tax threshold from CN¥3,500 to CN¥5,000 (US$705) in January 2019, and reduced the top tier of value added tax from 16% to 13% in April 2019. Income tax deductions were also allowed for family care, medical and educational expenses, as well as for mortgage interest. The tax cuts were worth around CN¥2.3 trillion (US$324 billion).

In May 2019, China's industrial output growth fell to 5.0%, which was the lowest rate in 17 years. Exports fell by 1.3% in June compared to the previous year; imports declined 8.5% in May and 7.3% in June. According to an analysis by Peterson Institute for International Economics published in June 2019, China had lowered tariffs on imports from countries other than the US from an average of 8.0% to 6.7%, while average tariffs on US imports rose from 8.0% to 20.7%.

In December 2019, the South China Morning Post reported that, due to the trade war and the Chinese government's crackdown on shadow banking, Chinese manufacturing investments were expanding at the lowest rate since records began. Economic growth rate for 2019 was 6.1%, the slowest since 1990.

The trade war resulted in a significant growth of economic ties between China and the European Union, primarily as a result of the redistribution of commodity flows.

The trade war contributed to a rise in Chinese nationalism; the South China Morning Post reported that the conflict helped the Chinese Communist Party "shore up much-needed domestic support". The external pressure of the trade war allowed Chinese leader Xi Jinping to point to the United States' actions as a reason for China's economic slowdown.

As of 2023, many Chinese solar panel manufacturers shifted their assembly operations from the US to Southeast Asian countries like Malaysia, Thailand, Vietnam, and Cambodia, according to the US Commerce Department. In 2025, China's GDP grew by 5.2% in April to June despite the trade war escalation, due to Chinese government support and front-loading shipments by Chinese factories before tariffs. Amidst weak demand and impact of US tariffs, China had increased infrastructure spending and consumer subsidies, cutting interest rates to support their economy. The country's export shipments to the US fell by 33% in August.

Following the tariffs implemented by President Trump in 2025, China decreased its oil imports from the United States by 90% and increased its oil imports from Canada. As of May 2025, Chinese companies stopped buying US soybeans and increased soybeans orders from Argentina, Uruguay, and Brazil.

As of May 2025, China had reduced its US Treasury holdings for the third consecutive month since March, lowering them to US$756.3 billion from US$757.2 billion in April. This is the lowest amount since March 2009.

Despite the trade war and subsequent reductions in China's trade surplus with the United States, China continued to grow its overall trade surplus by 20% from 2024 to a record $1.19 trillion in 2025 with increasing exports to other countries. Some exports were also indirectly shipped to the United States through third countries, particularly those in Southeast Asia.

As of July 2026, China's exports of rare earth magnets to the US reached 20% below the average level between 2022 and 2024 despite the trade truce in October 2025.

=== United States ===
==== US consumer impact ====
Analysis conducted by the Peterson Institute for International Economics found that China imposed uniform tariffs averaging 8% on all its importers in January 2018, before the trade war began. By June 2019, tariffs on American imports had increased to 20.7%, while tariffs on other nations declined to 6.7%. The analysis also found that average American tariffs on Chinese goods increased from 3.1% in 2017 to 24.3% by August 2019.

Analysis by Goldman Sachs in May 2019 found that the consumer price index for nine categories of tariffed goods had increased much more than goods not impacted by tariffs. The CPI for tariffed goods increased, while it declined for all other core goods.

Surveys of consumer sentiment and small business confidence showed sharp declines in August 2019 on uncertainty caused by the trade war. The closely followed Purchasing Managers' Index for manufacturing from the Institute for Supply Management showed contraction in August, for the first time since January 2016; the ISM quoted several executives expressing anxiety about the continuing trade war, citing shrinking export orders and the challenges of shifting their supply chains out of China. The IHS Markit manufacturing purchasing managers' index also showed contraction in August, for the first time since September 2009. The day the ISM report was released, Trump tweeted, "China's Supply Chain will crumble and businesses, jobs and money will be gone!"

American importers were allowed to apply for exclusions from the tariffs. The Wall Street Journal reported in February 2020 that the USTR was granting fewer tariff waivers to American firms, down from 35% of requests for the first two tranches of tariffs in 2018 to 3% for the third tranche in 2019. The mechanism for applying for exclusions expired in 2020.

Many companies passed the costs of the Trump tariffs on to consumers in the form of higher prices. Following impositions of the tariffs on Chinese goods, the prices of US intermediate goods rose by 10% to 30%, an amount generally equivalent to the size of the tariffs.

According to the Consumer Technology Association, a 60% tariff on Chinese imports could increase the price of laptops and tablets by up to 46% and smartphones by up to 26%. It is estimated by the National Retail Federation that consumers will have to pay an extra $6.4–$10.9 billion for appliances with tariffs.

==== Job losses ====
Analysis conducted by Moody's Analytics estimated that through August 2019 300,000 American jobs had either been lost or not created due to the trade war, especially affecting manufacturing, warehousing, distribution and retail.

By September 2019, American manufacturers were reducing their capital investments and delaying hiring due to uncertainty caused by the trade war.

A 2021 study by Oxford Economics and the US-China Business Council concluded that the United States lost 245,000 jobs as a direct result of the Trump tariffs.

==== Overall economy ====
Analysis published by The Wall Street Journal in October 2020 found the trade war did not achieve the primary objective of reviving American manufacturing nor did it result in the reshoring of factory production. Consistent with this, a study of 244 relocation decisions found that reshoring to the home country accounted for just 15.6% of moves in 2018–2023. Though the trade war led to higher employment in certain industries, tariffs led to a net loss of US manufacturing jobs. The United States' overall trade deficit increased. American businesses shifted their imports to other countries to avoid the Trump tariffs and the deficit in goods increased 21% from 2016 to a record high. American exports – notably farm goods – were also weakened by retaliatory actions from China, the European Union, and other countries. Economist Stephen Roach writes that by replacing the Chinese portion of the United States' trade gap with deficits from other nations that produce goods at higher cost, the diversion of trade to non-Chinese sources has resulted in the functional equivalent of a tax hike on United States companies and consumers.

The Phase I agreement failed to address any structural aspects of the structural conflicts between the United States and China. The overall US trade deficit worsened, with supply trade diverted from China to higher-cost foreign producers rather than being supplied domestically. Tariffs imposed by the US increased costs of Chinese imports for US consumers and business.

In 2021, the US trade deficit with China increased.

Analysis published by Chad Bown of the Peterson Institute for International Economics found that if there was no trade war initiated by Trump and if the US share of the Chinese market had just stayed consistent, then US exports to China would have been $119 billion bigger than what was actually recorded during Trump's administration during 2018 to 2021. Additionally, the trade war had incurred further costs of $30 billion in taxpayers funds that Trump used to subsidize the country's farmers to compensate for their lost sales to China from 2018 to 2020. Bown concluded that Trump's trade policies were not worth it for US exporters and that they would have likely have been better off without Trump's trade war.

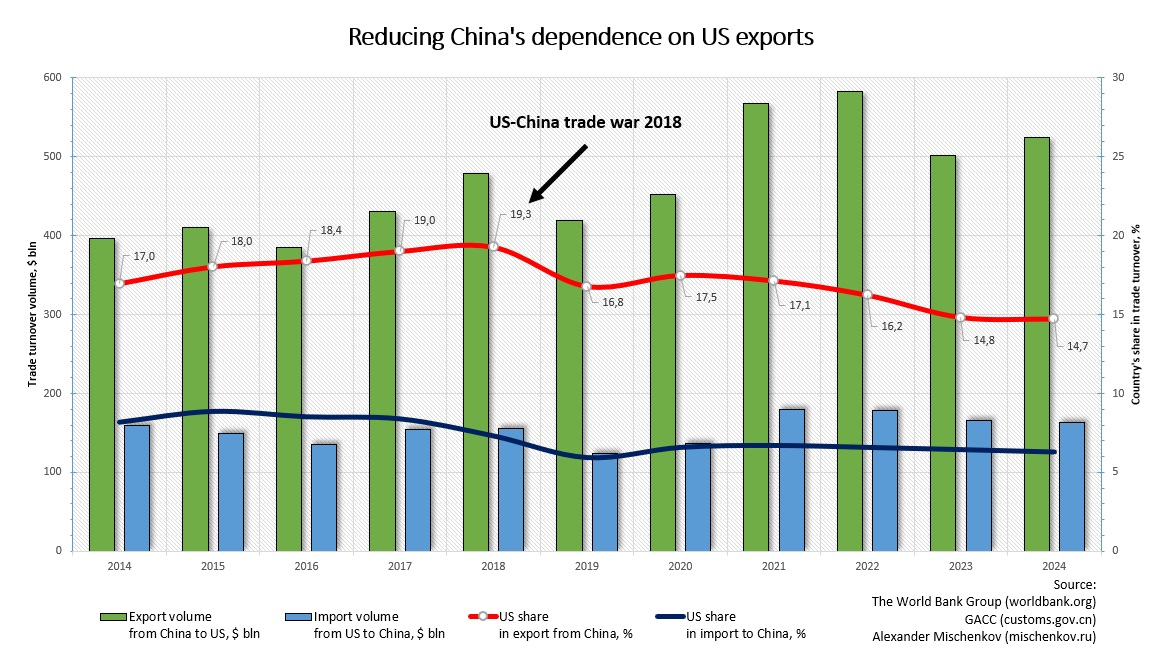
Reducing China's dependence on export to US. After US-China trade war in 2018, China increased its foreign trade volumes. At the same time, the US share of China's export revenues declined.

==== Stock market ====
Investor uncertainty due to the trade war caused turbulence in the stock market.

The Dow Jones Industrial Average fell 724 points, or 2.9%, after the tariffs were announced due to concerns over a trade war. Corporations that traded with China, such as Caterpillar Inc. and Boeing, suffered large losses in their stock price.

On December 4, 2018, the Dow Jones Industrial Average logged its worst day in nearly a month as it declined nearly 600 points, to which some argue is in part due to the trade war.

On August 23, 2019, the Dow dropped 623 points on the day that Trump informally ordered American companies to immediately seek alternatives to doing business in China. By the end of 2019, stock markets reached record highs, having risen due to the agreement between the United States and China to sign the first phase of a trade deal.

==== US farmer impact ====
American farmers faced significant challenges due to China's retaliatory trade actions. From 2010 to 2016, China was the largest market for US agricultural products, with exports peaking at $25.5 billion in 2015. Although US agricultural exports to China totaled $19.4 billion in 2017, making it the second-largest market behind Canada, the trade war drastically reduced these figures. By 2018, exports had plummeted to $9.1 billion. A partial recovery followed in 2019, with exports reaching $13.8 billion; however, by then, China had fallen to the fourth-largest market for US agricultural goods, trailing Canada, Mexico, and Japan, respectively.

Soybean exports accounted for the largest annualized losses with China, totaling $9.4 billion. Sorghum followed in second, losing $854 million, and pork third, losing $646 million. Relative to exports in 2017 as a – change, by 2018, the most impacted agricultural commodities by total losses were soybeans, wheat, corn, coarse grains, hides and skins, fresh fruit, pork, dairy products, processed fruit, and cotton.

The United States is the world's second-largest producer of soybeans, behind Brazil. China is the world's largest soybean importer, importing about 60% of the global market in 2024. Between 2017 and 2018, China's share of US soybean exports dropped from 62% to 18%. It recovered to 55% by 2020. Soybean farmers were some of the most impacted by Chinese tariffs. Soybean farmers lost an estimated $24 billion in exports and accounted for the predominant number of increasing farm bankruptcies in 2018. By 2019, soybean farmers had planted 15% less acreage than in 2018. Trade represents 50% of soybean farmers income, as compared to the national average of 20%.

Other massive agricultural disruptions included products like cranberries, hay, and ethanol. Cranberry exports to China rose nearly 77% from 2007 to 2016 when a barrel of fruit would sell for $58.60. By 2018, the price had fallen 62% to only $22.30 per barrel. Hay exports to China dropped 36%, resulting in an estimated $300 million in the first two years compared to the anticipated $400 million. Ethanol, a corn-based biofuel, had emerged as an important agricultural byproduct commodity to China, exporting for a total of $300 million in 2017. By 2018, total exports dropped 86%.

Regionally, the Midwest was most impacted by the agricultural tariffs by China. For example, Iowa, Illinois, and Kansas represented the largest share of annualized losses in agriculture revenue in 2018. Losing $1.46 billion, $1.41 billion, and $955 million, respectively, Iowa, Illinois, and Kansas accounted for 11%, 11%, and 7% of all total agricultural losses in 2018.

Agricultural tariffs against the US by China began in April 2018 when retaliatory tariffs between 15% and 25% on US imports included 94 different lines on US agricultural goods. These first tariffs predominantly focused on pork, fruit, and tree nuts. Then, in July 2018, China expanded agricultural tariffs of 25% to a total of 697 different lines. On September 1, 2019, Chinese agricultural tariffs had increased to 1053 different lines. Although most agricultural tariffs on US goods by China began at 25%, some goods like pork, fruits and nuts, grains, sugar, and soybeans reached tariffs as high as 80% to 100%.

The Trump administration responded to decreasing agricultural exports through a series of acts and bailouts. Between 2018 and 2020, the United States Department of Agriculture's Farm Service Agency administered and oversaw the distribution of $23 billion in the form of direct payments to farmers for losses caused by international trade disputes through the Market Facilitation Program. Specifically, in 2019 the USDA's Market Facilitation Program paid $14.4 billion across 644,000 farming operations. The average payment per operation was $22,312 and focused on three types of eligible commodities: (1) non-specialty crops (such as corn and soybeans); (2) specialty crops (such as fruits and nuts); (3) dairy and pork products. Of the $14.4 billion in farmer assistance in 2019, 90% went to farmers of non-specialty crops, totaling $12.9 billion.

Another form of agricultural assistance was the Food Purchase and Distribution Program by the United States Department of Agriculture. Specifically designed to offset already produced agricultural commodities in the form of surplus, USDA purchased roughly $2.3 billion in US agriculture impacted by trade tariffs. The most significant commodities purchased were pork, dairy, and apples.

Finally, the third program introduced by USDA was the Agricultural Trade Promotion Program. Designed to assist American agricultural exporters in identifying and accessing new markets to mitigate the impacts of agricultural tariffs by China, the program accepted applications beginning in November 2018 to access the $200 million federal budget and promote their products abroad.

For soybean farmers impacted by the trade tariffs with China, these agricultural mitigation programs helped lessen losses to US soybean farmers. For example, soybean farmers began exporting to new markets in 2018 to markets like Mexico, Egypt, and the European Union. These new markets accounted for $4.7 billion, partially offsetting the $9.4 billion loss with China in 2018.

In 2020, the US and China agreed on new agricultural tariffs through the Phase One Agreement which created a new trade agreement that required structural reforms and changes to China's economic and trade regime. The agreement included a commitment by China to make substantial purchases of US goods and services, of which agricultural products were included in the Agriculture Chapter. The first part of the agreement included a commitment by China to purchase and import an average of at least $40 billion US agricultural products across two years between 2020 and 2022 totaling $80 billion. Additionally, specific agricultural products that had been the recipient of tariffs by China were addressed. Most notable were US exports of beef, pork, poultry, processed meat, dairy, rice, seafood, fruits, and feed products. However, between 2020 and 2022, only 73% of the agreed-upon $40 billion was spent on US agricultural products by China. In 2020, US exports to China totaled $26.4 billion, and in 2021 totaled $32.7 billion. This amounted to a total two-year export value by the US to China of $59.5 billion. Essential commodities like soybeans grew from a total export value of $15.1 billion in 2020, to $17.9 billion by the end of 2022.

==== Elections ====
Analysts speculated that the trade war could affect the 2020 United States presidential election, as tariffs have negatively affected farmers, an important constituency for Trump. Analysts also speculated on how the trade war affected Xi Jinping in relation to the domestic pressures that he faced.

Subsequent research has examined the electoral effects of the trade war and of the farm payments made to offset it. A study of the 2019 USDA Market Facilitation Program, which distributed $14.5 billion to farmers according to a formula combining historical production with commodity-specific estimates of trade damage, found that the damage estimates over-compensated some crops relative to plausible losses, and that the resulting windfall fell on counties according to their historical crop mix. Using this variation as a natural experiment, Robert Gulotty and Anton Strezhnev estimate that an additional $1 million in payments to a county raised the Republican share of the two-party presidential vote there in 2020 by about 0.18 percentage points, and that had 2019 spending remained at 2018 levels the national two-party Republican share would have been roughly 0.12 percentage points lower, with larger effects in Arizona and Georgia.

In 2021, following the transition to the Biden administration, the Financial Times reported that "rushing to remove the tariffs could prove risky" for the Democrats in the 2022 United States elections.

=== Other countries ===
Economic growth has slowed worldwide amid the trade war. The International Monetary Fund's World Economic Outlook report released in April 2019 lowered the global economic growth forecast for 2019 from 3.6% expected in 2018 to 3.3%, and said that economic and trade frictions may further curb global economic growth and continue weaken the investment. US economic growth has also slowed.

Globally, foreign direct investment has slowed. The trade war has hurt the European economy, particularly Germany, even though trade relations between Germany and China and between Germany and the US remain good. Germany and the EU have had high levels of trade with China, and the German government and public want to maintain these trade ties. The Canadian economy has seen negative effects as well. Like the US, Britain, Germany, Japan, and South Korea were all showing "a weak manufacturing performance" as of 2019. Several Asian governments have instituted stimulus measures to address damage from the trade war, though economists said this may not be effective.

Some countries have benefited economically from the trade war, at least in some sectors, due to increasing exports to the United States and China to fill the gaps left by decreasing trade between these two economies. Beneficiaries include Vietnam, Chile, India, Malaysia, and Argentina. Vietnam is the biggest beneficiary, with technology companies moving manufacturing there. South Korea has also benefited from increased electronics exports, Malaysia from semiconductor exports, Mexico from motor vehicles, and Brazil from soybeans. Trade diversion effects have also had an impact on countries in East and Southeast Asia with Taiwan getting the largest boost. US-ASEAN Business Council CEO Alex Feldman said these countries may not benefit for long: "It's in everyone's interest to see this spat get resolved and go back to normal trade relations between the US and China." Several Taiwanese companies have been expanding production domestically, including Quanta Computer, Sercomm and Wistron, creating over 21,000 jobs. This investment led to a significant strengthening of the New Taiwan Dollar which had not been expected pre-Trade War. Nintendo has reportedly moved some Nintendo Switch production from China to Southeast Asia.

The trade war has indirectly caused some companies to go bankrupt. One of them, Taiwanese LCD panel manufacturer Chunghwa Picture Tubes (CPT), went bankrupt as a result of an excess supply of panels and a subsequent collapse in prices, which was aided by vulnerability to the trade war, a slowing Taiwanese and global economy and a slowdown in the electronics sector.

Through practices of trade re-routing and re-labeling, the trade war has redirected Chinese trade to the United States via ASEAN. As the Trump administration put tariffs on goods originating from China, they also planned to tax any goods having a high degree of "Chinese content" in 2025. As a result, some Southeast Asian countries has vowed to suppress transshipments such as Vietnam, Malaysia, and Thailand. The Philippines was also affected by the trade war as the country is heavily reliant on imports that came from China and exports that went to the US.

== Reactions ==
=== In China ===
Mainland Chinese politicians and economists have been divided over the trade war. An August 2019 article in NPR said that while some in the PRC leadership argued for a quick resolution to the trade war in order to save China's economy, others said that the country should push back against the United States and avoid an agreement at all costs. The Chinese government characterizes the US side as infringing on Chinese national sovereignty through demanding structural changes to China's economic system. The Chinese public was generally surprised by the beginning of the trade war, according to academic Lin Mao.

In July 2018, academic Xu Zhangrun said that the trade war revealed underlying weaknesses in the Chinese political system and criticized Chinese leader Xi Jinping for his "overweening pride" and "vanity politics."

In August 2018, Hong Kong-based academic Willy Lam said that the trade war had galvanized all the previous misgivings which different countries in the West had toward China and undermined Chinese leader Xi Jinping's authority. Zhang Baohui, a political science professor at Lingnan University in Hong Kong, similarly said that the trade war had been effective in challenging the myth of Chinese invincibility, saying that the tariffs "really hurt China at a very bad time, when the economy is experiencing serious trouble."

Economist Sheng Hong, director of the defunct think tank Unirule Institute of Economics, said that it would be good if China yielded to America's request for fair trade, arguing that the "China model" of state capitalism was incompatible with its policies of market reforms and damaging China's economy. Amidst the closure Unirule after Hong was accused of threatening of state security, Hong likened Beijing's inability to brook internal criticism to "riding in a car with a filthy windshield."

A December 2018 journal article published by two Chinese academics said that in the worst-case scenario of the trade war, China would suffer a 1.1% decrease in employment and a 1% GDP loss, which they said were not negligible, but manageable for China. Another paper published in February 2018 by Chinese academics similarly concluded that whereas the United States would experience large social welfare losses as a result of the trade war, China may lose or gain slightly depending on the effect of trade war on the US–China trade balance.

In September 2019, Lu Xiang, an analyst at the state-backed Chinese Academy of Social Sciences, expressed pessimism about the outcome of upcoming talks, called Trump "unpredictable", and said, "We can only try to find sensible clues in his nonsense."

Domestic reporting on the trade war is censored in China. While news outlets are permitted to report on the conflict, their coverage is subject to restrictions; the South China Morning Post said that employees for Chinese media were told not to "over-report" the trade war while an article in The New York Times said that state news outlets had sought to promote the official line, with the authorities restricting the use of the phrase "trade war." Social media posts about the conflict are subject to censorship as well.

The trade war is a common subject on Chinese social media, with one popular Internet meme referencing Thanos, a villain from Marvel Comics and the Marvel Cinematic Universe who wipes out half of all life in the universe using the Infinity Gauntlet, joking that Trump will similarly wipe out half of China's investors.

Hong Kong economics professor Lawrence J. Lau argues that a major cause of the trade war is the growing battle between China and the US for global economic and technological dominance. He argues, "It is also a reflection of the rise of populism, isolationism, nationalism and protectionism almost everywhere in the world, including in the US."

In mid-2021, Taoran Notes, a social media account associated with the state-run Economic Daily, advised Chinese decision-makers to remain calm and recommended that both sides develop a deeper understanding of each other's perspectives. Taoran Notes said that the two countries had chosen "the path of cooperation that seeks common ground while reserving differences".

People's Daily, the official newspaper of the Central Committee of the Chinese Communist Party, has stated that China will be able to withstand the trade war, and that Trump's policies are affecting American consumers. Some online discussions in China, especially commentary suggesting negative impacts to the national economy and particular companies, have been widely censored.

After the signing of the Phase One agreement, the Chinese Communist Party tabloid Global Times published a series of articles reflecting on the trade war. According to the Global Times, the trade war had made Chinese people more mature and confident and the country proved it had political and economic institutions strong enough to defend its interests. In the view of the Global Times, China had not made too many concessions as part of the Phase One agreement. While China agreed to buy more from the United States, these were not forced purchases and China could make purchases based on its own needs. The structural changes China agreed to regarding intellectual property protections and opening more economic sectors to foreign investment would, according to the Global Times, ultimately serve China's needs to further deepen its reforms.

On April 15, 2025, Xia Baolong, director of the Central Hong Kong and Macao Affairs Office, said in a video on Hong Kong National Security Education Day that Hong Kong is the largest source of the United States' trade surplus, but the United States imposes high tariffs on Hong Kong. "This makes it clearer to the world that the US cannot tolerate Hong Kong’s prosperity and stability, and it is the biggest sinister manipulator undermining human rights, freedom, the rule of law, prosperity and stability in Hong Kong", he said."it is extremely naive to think that peace, respect and development can be achieved by flattering, yielding or pleading with the United States. The so-called sanctions and reciprocal tariffs by the United States cannot shake the determination and will of the central government and the Hong Kong SAR government. The 1.4 billion Chinese people, including our Hong Kong compatriots, will not be intimidated. It will only make us more united and more determined to safeguard national security and Hong Kong's prosperity and stability," he added.

=== In the United States ===
==== Congress ====
Some Democrats opposed the trade war for putting a burden on American consumers and causing inflation, while other Democrats thought action against China was necessary, although not all such Democrats thought the trade war initiated by Trump was the right means of action.

Senate Democratic leader Chuck Schumer praised President Trump's higher tariffs against China's alleged taking advantage of the US and said "Democrats, Republicans, Americans of every political ideology, every region in the country should support these actions." Other Democratic senators who supported Trump's actions include Bob Menendez, Sherrod Brown and Ron Wyden. Bipartisan support from the House of Representatives for Trump's actions came from Nancy Pelosi. Brad Sherman, Kevin Brady, and Ted Yoho. Democratic representative Tim Ryan, said, "What China has been doing is bullshit. They're cheating, they're subsidizing their product." Senator Marco Rubio has also supported the tariffs, which he referred to as a "theft tax".

Other Republican senators have given more divided statements. Mitch McConnell said that "nobody wins a trade war" but that there was hope the tactics would "get us into a better position, vis-à-vis China." John Cornyn said, "If this is what it takes to get a good deal, I think people will hang in there, but at some point we've got to get it resolved. If this goes on for a long time, everybody realizes it's playing with a live hand grenade." Joni Ernst said in May 2019 that the "tariffs are hurtful" to farmers, but that they "do want us to find a path forward with China" and said, "We hope that we can get a deal soon".

Other senators from both parties have criticized Trump for the trade war, including Chuck Grassley, Tim Kaine, Mark Warner, Elizabeth Warren, and Ron Wyden.

==== Agricultural ====
The Associated Press reported in 2018 that "Dave Warner, a spokesman for the National Pork Producers Council, said pork producers have already seen the value of their pigs fall after a previous Chinese tariff. Warner said pig producers will likely feel the effect of the new tariff, though it's not yet clear exactly how."

Iowa soybean farmer and president of the American Soybean Association John Heisdorffer called the use of tariffs a "scorched-earth approach", warning that US industries could permanently lose global market share as a result.

The mayors of Davenport and St. Gabriel, which represented towns with a heavy reliance on the farming sector, expressed their concerns of impacts that the trade war would have on their cities.

In August 2019, Roger Johnson of the National Farmers Union – representing about 200,000 family farmers, ranchers and fishers – stated that the trade war was creating problems for American farmers, specifically highlighting the fall in soybean exports from the US to China. In the same month, the American Farm Bureau Federation – representing large agribusiness – said that the announcement of new tariffs "signals more trouble for American agriculture."

==== Business ====
More than 3,500 American businesses sued the Trump administration over the tariffs.

In September 2018, a business coalition announced a lobbying campaign called "Tariffs Hurt the Heartland" to protest the proposed tariffs; the tariffs on Chinese steel, aluminum, and certain chemicals contributed to rising fertilizer and agricultural equipment costs in the United States.

In February 2019, a survey released by the American Chamber of Commerce in China showed that a majority of member US companies supported increasing or maintaining tariffs on Chinese goods, and nearly twice as many respondents compared to the year before wanted the US government to push Beijing harder to create a level playing field. A further 19% of its companies said they were adjusting supply chains or seeking to source components and assembly outside of China as a result of tariffs and 28% were delaying or canceling investment decisions in China.

Over 600 companies and trade associations, including manufacturers, retailers, and tech companies, wrote to Trump in mid-2019 to ask him to remove tariffs and end the trade war, saying that increased tariffs would have "a significant, negative, and long-term impact on American businesses, farmers, families, and the US economy".

On May 20, 2019, the Footwear Distributors and Retailers of America, an industry trade association for footwear, issued an open letter to President Trump, part of which read: "On behalf of our hundreds of millions of footwear consumers and hundreds of thousands of employees, we ask that you immediately stop this action", referring to the trade war.

Americans for Free Trade, a coalition of over 160 business organizations, wrote a letter to Trump in August 2019 requesting that he postpone all tariff rate increases on Chinese goods, citing concerns about cost increases for US manufacturers and farmers. The coalition includes the National Retail Federation, the Consumer Technology Association, Association of Equipment Manufacturers, the Toy Association and American Petroleum Institute, among others.

In September 2019, Matthew Shay, president and CEO of the National Retail Federation, said that the trade war had "gone on far too long" and had harmful effects on American businesses and consumers. He urged the Trump administration to end the trade war and find an agreement to remove all the tariffs.

Hun Quach, vice president of international trade for the Retail Industry Leaders Association has claimed that the tariffs will impact American family budgets by raising the prices of everyday items.

A spokesperson for the US–China Business Council said that the tariffs were "deeply unpopular with American consumers and businesses who bear the cost". Alibaba's Taobao app download surged following Trump tariffs that led to goods subject to 145 percent tariff. With increased cost, many US small businesses are looking for cheaper alternatives. Many US retailers are turning to Chinese owned commerce sites like Taobao, DHgate, reducing reliance on B2B sites like Alibaba to search for retail products that are sourced directly from the manufacturer. Many of Alibaba's e-commerce businesses were relatively unscathed by the tariffs because much of its revenue came from the Chinese market. But many of Trump's tariffs affected Alibaba through retaliatory taxes the Chinese government levied on US imports, which could, in turn, affect their supply chain and operational costs. Alibaba's cloud business will probably not be affected by the tariffs, but other trade restrictions could affect semi-conductor chip exports, which could impact the company. However, investor sentiment seemed unaffected by the tariffs, with many investors terming Alibaba a 'moderate buy'. 15 brokerages were of the view that Alibaba stock is considered a moderate buy with 12 month target price of $153.29.

==== Manufacturing ====
The CEOs of American steelmakers Nucor Corp, United States Steel Corp, ArcelorMittal SA and Commercial Metals Co have all supported Trump's steel tariffs against China as has the United Steelworkers Union. Scott Paul, president of the associated Alliance for American Manufacturing, has also supported tariffs, and opposed proposals to reverse them in light of the coronavirus pandemic. In 2019, he criticized the stagnation of trade talks saying "Trump would have ripped any Democrat for that outcome".

James Hoffa Jr., president of the International Brotherhood of Teamsters, has been a proponent of US tariffs against China as has Richard Trumka, president of AFL–CIO.

A 2019 statement by the National Association of Manufacturers stated their opposition to the trade war, calling for a new structure for the US–China commercial relationship that would eliminate China's unfair trade practices and level the playing field for manufacturers in the United States. A 2018 Politico article documented the close partnership between the president of NAM Jay Timmons and President Trump and said that Timmons was fighting against Trump's trade war from within.

The vice president of the National Marine Manufacturers Association criticized the tariffs, saying they were "hurting American manufacturers."

==== Economists and analysts ====
According to articles in PolitiFact, most mainstream economists said that "consumers are the primary victims of tariffs" and most economists said that they carry "more risks than benefits". Nearly all economists who responded to surveys conducted by the Associated Press and Reuters said that Trump's tariffs would do more harm than good to the economy of the United States, and some economists advocated for alternate means for the United States to address its trade deficit with China.

NYU Economics Professor Lawrence J. White has said that import tariffs are equivalent to a tax, and contribute to a higher cost of living.

Economic analyst Zachary Karabell has argued that the administration's tariff-based approach would not work as it would not "reverse what has already been transferred and will not do much to address the challenge of China today, which is no longer a manufacturing neophyte" and also argued that the assertion that more rigorous intellectual property protections would "level the playing field" was problematic. He recommended instead that the US focus on its relative advantages of economic openness and a culture of independence.

James Andrew Lewis of the Center for Strategic and International Studies said that what the United States needed from China was a commitment to observe the rules and norms of international trade and to extend reciprocal treatment to US companies in China.

In an April 2018 article in Forbes, Harry G. Broadman, a former US trade negotiator, said that while he agreed with the Trump administration's basic position that the Chinese did not abide by fair, transparent and market-based rules for global trade, he disagreed with its means of unilaterally employing tariffs and said that the administration should instead pursue a coalition-based approach.

In a 2018 speech on the trade war, former World Bank Chief Economist Priya Basu stated, "I'm from India. Over my entire career, I saw many developed countries try many approaches to open up the markets in developing countries. I never thought I would see the opposite happening."

In a November 2018 testimony before the Senate Finance Committee, Jennifer Hillman, a professor of practice at Georgetown University Law School, said that United States "ought to be bringing a big and bold case, based on a coalition of countries working together to take on China."

Chad Bown, a senior fellow at the Peterson Institute for International Economics said that while it made sense for other countries to get more involved in confronting China, the problem was that they did not know how serious Trump was on reforming the larger, systemic issues.

Michael Wessel described plans to allow foreign companies a greater role in the Chinese technology program "an influence operation at its best" and also questioned whether changes in relevant Chinese laws would mean much so long as the courts remained under the control of the Chinese Communist Party.

A May 2019 article written by Howard Gleckman of the Tax Policy Center argued that the impact of the trade war would eliminate "most or all" of the benefits from the Tax Cuts and Jobs Act for low- and middle-income households.

Economists at financial firm Morgan Stanley expressed uncertainty about how the trade war would end, but warned in June 2019 that it could lead to a recession.

Economist Panos Mourdoukoutas states that China's elites were fighting the trade war under the wrong assumption that China had reached "power parity" with the US and that although an economic divorce between the two countries would have some consequences for the US, it would on the other hand be devastating for China.

In November 2019, Jim Cramer said that unless China purchased a considerable amount of American goods as a way to prove the validity of the arguments proffered by the free-trade contingent in the Trump administration, the US–China trade war would continue on for a significant period of time.

After the first phase of a trade deal was agreed upon in December 2019, Mary E. Lovely of the Peterson Institute for International Economics and professor at Syracuse University said the ceasefire was "good news" for the American economy while expressing optimism that the talks would help address China's "unfair" intellectual property practices.

Economist Paul Krugman said in September 2020 that if Democratic candidate Joe Biden won the US presidential election, he should maintain a tough stance against China, but focus more on industrial policy than trade tariffs.

Economist C. Fred Bergsten concluded in 2021 that "China's economy is too large and too powerful to be suppressed. It fended off the Trump attacks with little damage, and indeed with renewed confidence in its prospects."

In study on the trade-effects of regulation in 2023, economists Knut Blind and Moritz Böhmecke-Schwafert concluded that tariff hikes by the US are expected to have an opposite effect in the mid- and long-term "and exports from China to the US might actually increase" based on trade data of OECD and BRICS countries in the last two decades.

==== Others ====
Minxin Pei, a scholar of Chinese politics at California's Claremont McKenna College, argued that Xi Jinping's ambition for China's revival as a worldpower had been revealed as hollow through the continuing trade dispute.

The former Vice President Joe Biden said: "While Trump is pursuing a damaging and erratic trade war, without any real strategy, China is positioning itself to lead the world in renewable energy."

An August 2019 Harvard CAPS/Harris Poll found that 67% of registered voters wanted the US to confront Beijing over its trade policies despite the fact that 74% said American consumers were shouldering most of the burden of tariffs. Mark Penn, the co-director of the Harvard CAPS/Harris Poll, said the poll showed strong support among the American public for Trump's trade policies against China, saying, "They realize that the tariffs may have negative impacts on jobs and prices, but they believe the fight here is the right one."

Tariffs on medical supplies have become politically complicated due to the COVID-19 pandemic. The Wall Street Journal, citing Trade Data Monitor to show that China is the leading source of many key medical supplies, raised concerns that US tariffs on imports from China threaten imports of medical supplies into the United States.

The Harvard CAPS/Harris poll conducted in January 2025 indicated that 52% of Americans approve of placing new tariffs on China, with 74% of Republicans agreeing, but only 34% of Democrats.

=== International ===
A September 2018 article by Brahma Chellaney said that America's trade war with China should not obscure a broader pushback against China's mercantilist trade, investment, and lending practices.

At the 2018 G20 summit, the trade war was on the agenda for discussion.

In December 2018 Jorge Guajardo, former Mexican ambassador to China, said in an article in The Washington Post that "One thing the Chinese have had to acknowledge is that it wasn't a Trump issue; it was a world issue. Everybody's tired of the way China games the trading system and makes promises that never amount to anything."

A March 2019 Reuters article said that the European Union shared many of the Trump administration's same complaints with regards to China's technology transfer policies and market access constraints and also reported that European diplomats and officials acknowledged support for Trump's goals, even if they disagreed with his tactics.

Singaporean Prime Minister Lee Hsien Loong said that the trade war was negatively affecting Singapore and described it as "very worrying". He urged both the US and Chinese governments to change their approaches.

At the 45th G7 summit, UK Prime Minister Boris Johnson said, "We don't like tariffs on the whole." An article in ABC said that US allies warned Trump during the summit about his trade war with China, but that Trump said he wasn't facing any pressure from his allies over the trade war. European Council President Donald Tusk said the trade war risked causing a global recession.

The Chilean vice minister for trade, Rodrigo Yanez, told CNBC that "It's very important for Chile that a trade deal between the US and China is signed soon".

In the wake of the 2020 Galwan Valley skirmish, Indian commentators made references to the US–China trade war as part of their overall analysis of the effect that the skirmish would have on the future relations between India and China.

== See also ==
- 2002 United States steel tariff
- Anti-American sentiment in China
- Anti-Chinese sentiment in the United States
- Australia–China trade war
- 2025 United States proposed tariffs against the European Union
- 2025–2026 Canada–United States trade war
- 2025–2026 Mexico–United States trade war
- Canada–China trade war
- Chinese espionage in the United States
- CIA activities in China
- Congressional-Executive Commission on China
- List of the largest trading partners of the United States
- List of the largest trading partners of China
- List of largest trading partners of India
- Plaza Accord
- Protectionism in the United States
- Rare earths trade dispute
- Second Cold War
- Trade policy of China
- Tariffs in the first Trump administration
- Tariffs in the second Trump administration
- Thucydides Trap
- Constructive Strategic and Stable Relationship
- Brazil–United States diplomatic dispute
