= Zizhu chuangxin =

Zizhu chuangxin (Chinese: 自主创新; pinyin: zìzhǔ chuàngxīn; lit. 'endogenous and/or indigenous innovation') is a term frequently used in China by the Chinese government, academics, and businesses to describe the Chinese technology-led economic transformation in the past decades.

The two terms (( '自主' - Zizhu in English means 'self-governed' or 'self-determined', and '创新' (Chuangxin means 'innovation' (noun) or 'innovate' (verb)) are separate terms. However, they had a very interesting and profound meaning from the point of view of evolutionary economics.

The expression is increasingly becoming an international topic of discussion. The Chinese government, led by the Chinese Communist Party (CCP), aimed to transform China into a scientifically and technologically advanced country by the year 2020, when it would possess self-driven 'unique' scientific and technological capabilities, as well as intellectual properties. The Chinese government had increasingly invested into science and innovation related projects throughout the 10th, 11th and 12th National Five Year Plans

== History ==
The term zizhu chuangxin (自主创新) first appeared in 1994 when Dr. Chen Jin referenced the term in his research on technologically led innovation in the electronics industry in China. It has been increasingly used since 2006, after Hu Jintao and Wen Jiabao declared that China should become an 'innovation-oriented' (创新型国家) nation. Following this, Chinese government, academics, and business focused increasingly on identifying and developing (nurturing) self-motivated indigenous capabilities (自主创新能力) among individual, enterprises, research organizations and universities.

So far academics in China have not come to any consensus on the appropriate English translation of the term. The most commonly used translations include:

(1) Endogenous Innovation (from neo-classical economics perspective, also from growth theory);

(2) Indigenous Innovation (from evolutionary economics, resource based view perspectives);

(3) Others including 'Self-reliant Innovation'; 'Self-determined Innovation'; 'Self-oriented Innovation'; 'Self-directed Innovation'; and 'Independent Innovation'.

The Chinese term '自主创新' has become one of the core concepts of the reform and opening up.

In the United States, the pioneering research on how technological-led indigenous innovation evolved in China was done by late Dr. Qiwen Lu. In Lu's 1997 Harvard Ph.D. thesis on the emergence and growth of three of China's major computer companies - Stone, Legend, and Founder (also see Lazonick 2004), - his approach on the theory of innovative enterprise in China was developed. Lu's book 'China's Leap into the Information Age' was published by Oxford University Press in 2000, with updated analyses of Stone, Legend, and Founder as well as the inclusion of the case of Great Wall. Lu died shortly after the publication.

In China, publications on science and technological innovation started to emerge after 1993 (Nian 2000) and the concept of National Systems of Innovation started to develop led by several research organizations in China such as China State Council Development Research Center (DRC) 国务院发展研究中心; Institute of Policy and Management, Chinese Academy of Sciences (CASIPM) and Tsinghua University.

In March 2013, Xi Jinping, the General Secretary of the China Communist Party, called for a strong innovation-led growth in the Chinese People's Political Consultative Conference (CPPCC) National Committee Meeting, see Xinhua (2013). The China innovation policy is expected to continue and lead the country from a low cost, production-led economy (low- to medium-technology industries) to a so-called knowledge-based economy (medium- to high-technology products and services).

However, the discussions on zizhu chuangxin did not touch much on the traditional industries from evolutionary economics perspective which characterized by their highly original, traditional and/or cultural-rich knowledge and practices. Indigenous knowledge and skills as assets were used, improved and still play a key part in many traditional sectors in developed and emerging countries (e.g., food & drink sector; cultural and entertainment sector). Lai in his PhD study (PhD 2013, Manchester, UK) investigated the case of Chinese medicine's innovation processes and used the term 'Indigenous Innovation' to differentiate it from the technological-driven innovation perspective.

== National Indigenous Innovation Capability (NIIC): 国家自主创新能力 Guójiā Zìzhǔ chuàngxīn Nénglì ==
The term 自主创新能力 (Chinese: 自主创新能力; pinyin: Zìzhǔ chuàngxīn nénglì; lit. 'Indigenous Innovation Capabilities (IIC)') had been translated by scholars as independent; self-reliant or self-determined innovation capabilities.

This is one of the core concepts of China's science and technological-led developments after Hu Jintao, Chairman of China Communist Party and People's Republic of China announced the strategic direction of China's developments from 2006 to 2020 in January 2006.

国家自主创新能力 (National Indigenous Innovation Capability, NIIC) is defined here as a high-level (national and provincial-based), complex and dynamic capabilities development concept in innovation policy and management studies reference to China context as an emerging socialistic country with a capitalistic economy.

NIIC is derived from the concept of 自主创新. Scholars and writers had various understandings. This is a kind of original capability (or a system of local self-created capabilities) that 'enable innovation of products and processes developed mainly from within a national context. The government encouraged individuals (e.g. scientists, researchers, engineers, and entrepreneurs) and organizations (research institutes, universities, and enterprises) within China to identify, engage and use various resources, e.g. experience, knowledge, and skills available from within the organization or network to collaborate and create highly sustainable, hard to imitate knowledge, capabilities and other tangible and intangible values (and various levels of inter-connected competitiveness).

Science and technological innovation has been highly emphasized by the China government in the 10th and 11th Five-Year Plan (2001–2011) and also in the 12th Five-Year Plan 2011–2016. In 2013, the China State Council issued the policy document the 'Comment on Strengthening and Enhancing Enterprise as the Key Player in Technological Innovation' as a step forward to confirm its determination to push enterprise to be the center of technological innovation in the future economic developments (China State Council 2013).
