= Panos Mourdoukoutas =

American economist

- Born: October 11, 1955 (age 71)

Academic background
- Education: Stony Brook University

Panos Mourdoukoutas (born October 11, 1955) is an American economist and Professor and Chair of the Department of Economics at LIU Post in New York.

== Controversial article ==
In July 2018, Forbes published an opinion piece by Mourdoukoutas titled "Amazon Should Replace Local Libraries to Save Taxpayers Money". It was deleted due to backlash from American libraries and their communities. In deleting the article, Forbes noted that it "was outside of this contributor’s specific area of expertise."
