= Beijing International Studies University =

Municipal public college in Beijing, China

Coordinates: 39.9093°N 116.5577°E

- 北京第二外国语学院
- Motto: 明德、勤学、求是、竞先 (Note: Literally means Being conscientious and hardworking; pursuing truth and excellence.)
- Motto in English: Integrity, Diligency, Verity, Competency
- Type: Public
- Established: 1964; 62 years ago
- Chancellor: Li Biyou
- President: Ji Jinbiao: 1964–1966: Li Chang; 1964–1966: Zhang Tian'en; 1978–1983: Tang Kai; 1983–1987: Zhang Daoyi; 1987–1989: Han Kehua; 1989–1991: Li Xianhui; 1991–1999: Chang Dianyuan; 1999–2006: Du Jiang; 2006–2014: Zhou Lie; 2014–2017: Cao Weidong; 2017–present: Ji Jinbiao
- Faculty: 680 (Note: Also claimed to be 500 from the university website.)
- Administrative staff: 300
- Students: 10,700 (incl. 1,048 international)
- Location: Beijing, China
- Campus: Urban; 1 Main: Chaoyang; 55.2 acres (0.23 km²); Satellite: Tongzhou; Under construction
- Affiliations: Academics: China Tourism Education; Translators Association of China; CIUTI; Administration: 1964-1966 Culture Ministry; 1966-1971 Foreign Ministry; 1971-1978 Beijing Government; 1978-1983 Education Ministry; 1983-2000 Tourism Ministry; 2000-present Beijing Municipal Government
- Colours: BISU Maroon; BISU Silver
- Website: Chinese website English website

Chinese name
- Simplified Chinese: 北京第二外国语学院
- Traditional Chinese: 北京第二外國語學院
- Literal meaning: Beijing No. 2 Foreign Language Institute
Transcriptions
Standard Mandarin
- Hanyu Pinyin: Běijīng Dì'èr Wàiguóyǔ Xuéyuàn

Beijing International Studies University (BISU; 北京第二外国语学院; lit. 'Beijing Second College of Foreign Languages') is a municipal public college of foreign languages in Chaoyang, Beijing, China. It is affiliated with the City of Beijing, and co-funded by the Beijing Municipal People's Government and the Ministry of Culture and Tourism.

== History ==
The history of Beijing International Studies University dates back to the 1950s, when People's Republic of China started to gain international recognition and the need emerged for proficient foreign language speakers. In the early 1960s, after completing the 14-country state visit, the then-Premier Zhou Enlai initiated the Seven-Year Plan for Foreign Language Education and proposed to establish the Beijing Second Foreign Languages Institute, now known as the Beijing International Studies University. (Note: The native name of BISU is Beijing Second Foreign Languages Institute, which was suggested by Zhou Enlai. The use of Second was intended to distinguish itself from the Beijing First Foreign Languages Institute, known as Beijing Foreign Studies University nowadays.) The whole founding process was under the supervision of Zhou.

=== Origins ===
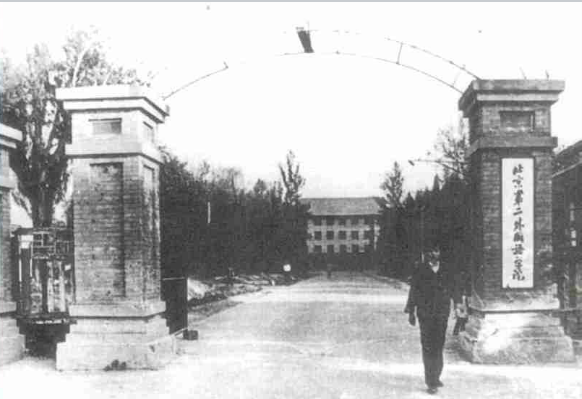
BISU North Entrance, 1960s. It was built upon a satellite site of Beijing Mining Institute.

It was proposed by the then Premier Zhou Enlai to the State Council and the establishment of Beijing International Studies University was given the highest priority. A report for the establishment of BISU was subsequently presented and approved at the State Council in March and later in August, the land where the university has maintained the presence of its main site was granted. The first 646 students enrolled in September and the Establishment Ceremony was held on 24 October 1964. The university anniversary has been celebrated on that day ever since.

=== Development ===
The original curriculum framework of the university was built upon its core units in foreign languages, in addition to Chinese literature, arts and philosophy, international/domestic relations, political economy and physical education. It offered degree programs for 14 foreign languages, including English, French, Spanish, Arabic, German, Japanese, Albanian, Romanian, Hungarian, Polish, Czech, Bulgarian, Serbian and Vietnamese. Affiliated with the Commission for Cultural Relations of Foreign Countries (Note: 对外文化联络委员会 (pinyin: Duìwài Wénhuà Liánluò Wěiyuánhuì), now usually known as Association for Cultural Relations with Foreign Countries, sometimes also State Council's Commission for Cultural Relations with Foreign Countries.)—the predecessor of today's Culture Ministry—the university underwent rapid growth until 1966, when the Cultural Revolution started. The university then changed administration several times over this period, successively administered by the Foreign Ministry (1968), the Beijing Government (1971), the Ministry of Education (1978) and the National Tourism Administration (1983).

In 1981, the report jointly submitted by the Ministry of Foreign Economic Relations and Trade and the university was approved at the Education Ministry; the Department of Foreign Affairs and Trade was established at BISU. Concurrently, in the same year, the National Tourism Administration set up the major of tourism management in BISU, making it the earliest shaper of Chinese tourism education. During the 1980s and 1990s, Beijing International Studies University, also known as the China Tourism Institute, prevailed in both teaching and research and was recognized as one of the foremost tertiary institutions for tourism studies.

=== 2003–present ===
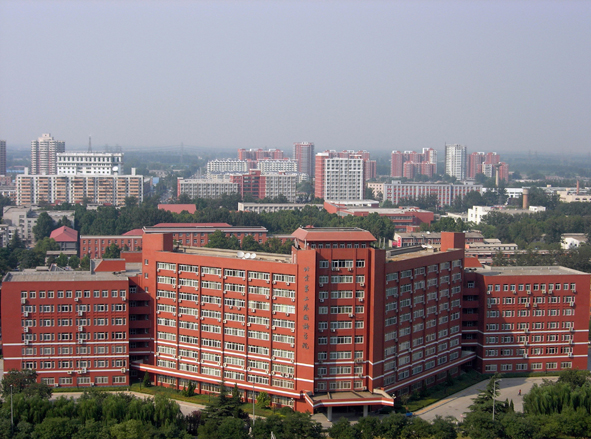
Main Hall, Beijing International Studies University, September 2006

Until 2003, BISU was known in English as Beijing Second Foreign Language University; the name changed to reflect the increasing diversity of programs offered by the university. Its multi-disciplinary academic structure has been established since the 1990s and 2000s, best known for its business administration programs and foreign languages programs. The university now offers language courses in English, Japanese, German, Russian, French, Italian, Spanish, Portuguese, Arabic, Korean and Chinese as a foreign language for international students. It is one of the first authorized HSK test centers based in Beijing, and has been recognized as one of Beijing's best universities for Chinese study.

In 2003, BISU established their school colors and visual identity; this was updated in 2009.

In 2013, the university engaged in a major academic restructuring within its Business and Economics disciplines. In July, the former School of Tourism Management was dissolved, with Departments of Tourism Management and Hotel Management promoted to independent Schools, Departments of Marketing and Financial Management combined to form the School of International Business, and the Department of Event Management merged into the School of Economics and Trade. The move was part of the Twelfth Five-Year Plan of the university, intending to endorse greater academic autonomy, take advantage of its heritage in tourism-related subjects and thus to effectively position itself in respond to the changes in the marketplace.

=== Timeline ===
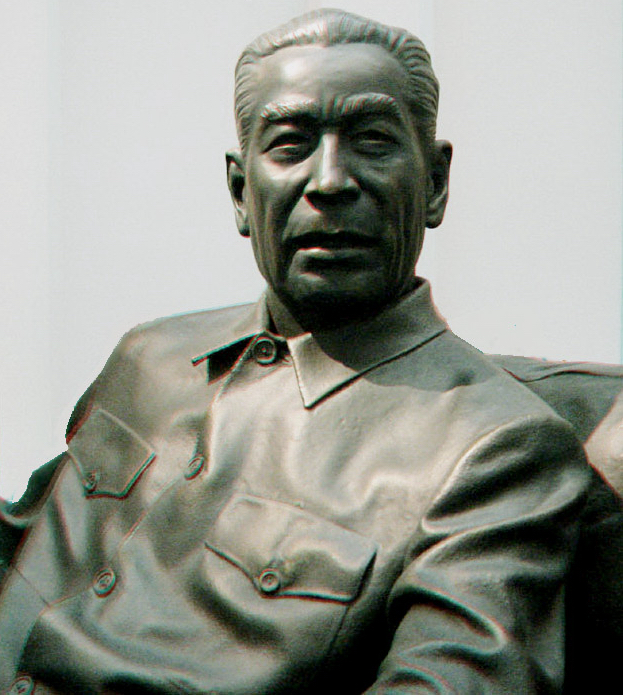
Former Chinese Premier Zhou Enlai, founder of Beijing International Studies University

==== 1964–1966: Humble beginnings ====
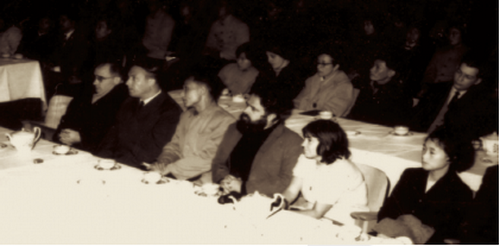
The first 22 BISU lecturers of international backgrounds, 1960s

- March 7, 1964: A report for the establishment of Beijing International Studies University was presented at the State Council. A week later, on 11 March, the report was approved.
- September 1964: The university was officially established, affiliated with the Commission for Cultural Relations of Foreign Countries. Academic units were originally organised into English Department, French Department, Department of Spanish and Arabic, Department of German and Japanese, Department of Eastern European Languages and a training center for providing intensive courses to national officers. The academic staff—including the first 22 (Note: Also denoted as 27 in The BISU Chronicle (1964–1993)) international staff members—were mainly drawn from the Commission, the Xinhua News Agency and sister universities (Note: Including Beijing Foreign Languages Institute, Beijing Language Institute, etc.) of BISU.
- September 14, 1964: The first 646 students commenced studying at BISU.
- October 22, 1964: Vice Premier and Foreign Minister Chen Yi inspected the university and gave a speech on the guiding principle for running a foreign language teaching university.
- October 24, 1964: Beijing International Studies University Establishment Ceremony was held. President of the Chinese Academy of Sciences Guo Moruo inscribed the university name.
- March 1, 1965: The bi-weekly school newspaper UniLife was founded.

==== 1966–1976: Dark times ====
- June 7, 1966: Class suspension at all levels due to Cultural Revolution. The next day, UniLife stopped publication; as of the suspension, 26 issues had been published.
- July 1966: From July, Premier Zhou Enlai visited BISU for consecutive five times. Zhou inspected the campus, talked with students and staff, and dined with students in the university dining hall. Vice Premiers Chen Yi and Li Xiannian also came to the campus to show their support.
- 1968: The Commission for Cultural Relations of Foreign Countries was abolished; the university was then affiliated with the Foreign Ministry.
- October 1971: The administration of the university was transferred to the Beijing Municipal Government. The Beijing Language Institute was then affiliated with BISU, which ran separately again in October 1972.
- 1973: Following the Cultural Revolution, the Renmin University was closed down and many of its foreign academic staff were transferred to BISU.
- April 1976: The staff at Chinese Teaching and Research Office formed the literary group Tong Huai Zhou (Chinese: 童怀周), which means Sharing the memories of Premier Zhou, (Note: "Tong Huaizhou, the penname adopted by the 16 faculty members at Beijing Second Foreign Language Institute who collected the poems, puns on "sharing memories [of Premier] Zhou" and strikes the major theme of the poems. The 1978 edition was based on a widely distributed and enormously popular two-volume Revolutionary Poems edited by the same group and unofficially published in 1977. The collection includes literary pieces in a variety of poetic forms, such as classical and modern poems, songs, elegiac couplets, and memorial speeches.""The first collection, put together by teachers and students of Beijing's Second Foreign Languages Institute under the homonym "Tong Huai Zhou" (All Cherish Zhou), ran to several hundred. These became known as The Tian'anmen Poems.") in response to the Tiananmen Incident. In the name of Tong Huai Zhou, the group compiled and published selected works of poetry and photo albums, issuing millions of copies and having a significant impact domestically and overseas. Those collections became known as The Tiananmen Poems.

==== 1977–1990: Post-Revolution recovery ====
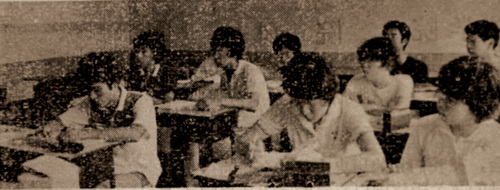
The first 26 international students commenced at BISU, 1981. They were students from Kyoto University of Foreign Studies.

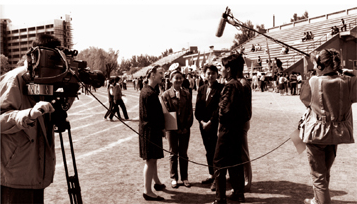
BISU students being interviewed by American journalists, 1989

- February 1978: The first 226 student commenced after the resumption of Gaokao, China's National College Entrance Examination.
- February 17, 1978: The State Council turned over the university to the Ministry of Education. It was co-administered by the Beijing Government in the meantime.
- February 1979: A new college was built up as the branch campus of BISU. It was later taken over by the Beijing Union University and renamed Beijing Tourism School in 1983.
- October 1978: Foreign Language Teaching (Chinese: 外语教学), the first academic journal of BISU, was founded. It was renamed Paper (Chinese: 学丛) in April 1980 and eventually Journal of Beijing International Studies University (Chinese: 北京第二外国语学院学报) in January 1986.
- 1979: The rock band Wan Li Ma Wang (Note: The band name, Wan Li Ma Wang, was derived from the family names of the four band members, with a literal meaning of "The swift horse prevails" in Chinese.) was established in winter, formed by BISU students Wan Xing, Li Shichao, Ma Xiaoyi and Wang Xinbo. Wan Li Ma Wang played mainly classic rock and is known to be the oldest rock band from China.
- April 1981: The Ministry of Foreign Economic Relations and Trade and the university jointly presented the report for the establishment of the Department of Foreign Affairs and Trade to the Education Ministry; the report was subsequently approved on the 1st of July. In September 1982, the Department admitted its first 51 students.
- June 4, 1981: The university signed the exchange agreement with Kyoto University of Foreign Studies. This is the first formal agreement signed with a foreign university by BISU. 26 students from Kyoto University of Foreign Studies commenced studying Chinese in July, who were the first short-term international exchange student admitted to BISU. The first long-term international students enrolled in September.
- July 1, 1981: UniLife resumed publication.
- July 1981: The National Tourism Administration set up the Department of Tourism Management in BISU, making it the earliest shaper of Chinese tourism education. The new established majors included tourism management and tourism translation (English, German and Japanese); in 1981 and 1982, 3100 students enrolled in the two majors.
- September 1981: The Center for Foreign Language Teaching was established, in charge of the training programs initiated by the United Nations.
- January 1982: The university became one of the first universities entitled by the State Council Academic Degrees Committee to award bachelor's degrees. The 362 graduating students of the same year were the first with undergraduate degrees awarded.
- March 1982: The university signed the exchange agreement with Cornell University School of Hotel Administration.
- March 29, 1983: The university became officially affiliated with the National Tourism Administration.
- March 1984: The Research Institute for Tourism Sciences was established. In 2003, the Institute was renamed Research Institute of Tourism Development.
- April 11, 1984: The university became one of the first universities entitled to award master's degrees. Later in June, the first 2 postgraduate students were admitted to the university.
- October 1985: China Tourism Institute (Chinese: 中国旅游学院) became the alternative name of BISU. It coexisted with the original Beijing International Studies University in the 1980s and 1990s.
- April 10, 1986 – April 23, 1986: The play Timon of Athens was performed at China's first Shakespeare Festival. It was one of the only two English plays; the other one was The Merchant of Venice presented by People's Liberation Army Art Theatre.

==== 1991–2000: Strategic redirection ====
- 1994: To mark the 30th Anniversary of BISU, Vice Premiers Li Lanqing and Qian Qichen, Chairman of the National Tourism Administration Liu Yi (CNTA) wrote inscription as a token of congratulation to the university.
- January 1994: The university became one of the first authorised HSK test centers based in Beijing.
- March 17, 1997: Accompanied by the Chairman of National Tourism Administration He Guangwei, the then vice premier, Li Lanqing, inspected the university and gave a speech.
- October 24, 1997: The university was titled Model Campus. (Note: 文明校园, an honorary title awarded by the Chinese government based on a set of requirements. The term literally means "civilised campus" in Chinese, which in practice refers more to ethos, merit, courtesy, ecologically outstanding landscape and other relevant attributions of a university.)
- December 1997: The university was connected to the Internet for the first time.
- December 1997: Electronic operation systems came into use in the dining halls, ending the history of Fan Piao (Chinese: 饭票; lit. 'meal ticket') at BISU.
- December 1999: The official website was established. The original domain name was www.erwai.net.cn.

==== 2001–2010: New millennium ====
- June 20, 2001: The university got the approval from the National Press Bureau to rename The UniLife to Newsletter of Beijing International Studies University. From September 2001, the newspaper officially became a publicly published news media using the national serial number CN11—0965/(G).
- October 2002: The university was named Outstanding Academic Institution for International Students Education by Beijing Education Commission. Only 9 out of the 56 received an Outstanding.
- July 11, 2003: The university's English name was officially changed to Beijing International Studies University (abbreviated as BISU). In accordance with this, the university's website domain was changed to www.bisu.edu.cn.
- December 5, 2003: The winning design of BISU Union's rebranding initiative came into use. The new Union logo was designed by Zhao Ting (02' Department of Finance).
- May 29, 2004: The Beijing International Studies University Alumni Association was established. On the same day, a statue was set up on campus, which was donated by alumni and current students in honor of the former Premier Zhou Enlai.
- October 19, 2004 – October 24, 2004: The ceremony for BISU's 40th Anniversary was held. The then Vice Premier Li Lanqing wrote inscription as a token of congratulation to the university. BISU also received congratulations message from State Councillors including Xu Jialu, Han Qide and Chen Zhili.
- July 2006: The BISU Japanese Alumni Association was established by BISU's Japanese graduates. As of 2006, several thousand Japanese students graduated from the university.
- November 5, 2007: The first Confucius Institute of BISU was established in Autonomous University of Chihuahua, Mexico.
- September 24, 2008 – September 26, 2008: The China Tourism Education Committee was established under the China Tourism Association. Beijing International Studies University was elected President Unit, the then Chancellor Duan Jianguo was appointed Chairman.

==== What's new ====
- June 29, 2011: Inauguration of the Institute of China Translation Development was held at Beijing International Studies University. It is the first national research center focused on the Chinese translation industry and is a strategic alliance of BISU and the Translators Association of China, with support from CIUTI and China Foreign Languages Publishing Administration. The ceremony was attended by prominent representatives from the academia and industry, and was reported by Xinhuanet, People's Daily and the China Internet Information Center.

== Campus ==
BISU's main site is located in Chaoyang District, comprising three continuous campuses within walking distance of each other. It houses the main teaching facilities and student amenities, and benefits from excellent public transport links with access to metro subway line 6 and 8T. The university also maintains facilities in other parts of the city. It owns an independently run Hospitality Institute in Daxing and has two branch colleges, one at the boundary between Fengtai and Haidian Districts, and one on the outskirts between the inner city and the County of Miyun. In addition, a new site is projected to be built in Tongzhou from 2013.

=== Main Campus ===
BISU's central campus occupies a 55.2-acre (223,334 m^{3}) site in the vicinity of the Guomao neighbourhood, about 5 miles (8.8 km) east of the Central CBD. It neighbours the Communication University of China from the West Gate and has two main entrances on Jianguo Road (South Entrance) and Chaoyang Road (North Entrance), both with bus stops located within walking distance.

The campus is featured by a mixture of contemporary and antique architecture which is naturally integrated into the landscape. While situated in the urban area, it is honored Garden Campus and has maintained this title since 1994. In 1997, it was named the city's Model Campus.

The central campus boasts five major teaching buildings and four auditoriums, six student halls of residence, a comprehensive learning hub and the university library. Full meals and light fare are available at two dining halls and five specialty restaurants, in addition to three corner stores offering snacks and drinks. Vending machines are on the ground floor of the International Lodge. In addition, it contains most of the sports facilities, including an outdoor stadium with two volleyball courts and six basketball courts, an indoor gymnasium, four tennis courts and an aquatic center. Other amenities include a supermarket, two copy shops, a book store and a post office. A pharmacy and an ICBC bank branch are located at the North Entrance, opposite to the Tian-Ke-Long shopping mall on the other side of the road. The university press Tourism Education Press headquarter office is also located nearby.

The northern campus houses the School of Continuing Education and the Study Abroad Resource Center. The Yi-Shui-Fang-Yuan campus in the south is the new residential area developed in 2011. Separated by the Jingtong Expressway from the central campus, it is centered on a peaceful site along the Tonghui River and provides housing facilities for most of the undergraduate and postgraduate students.

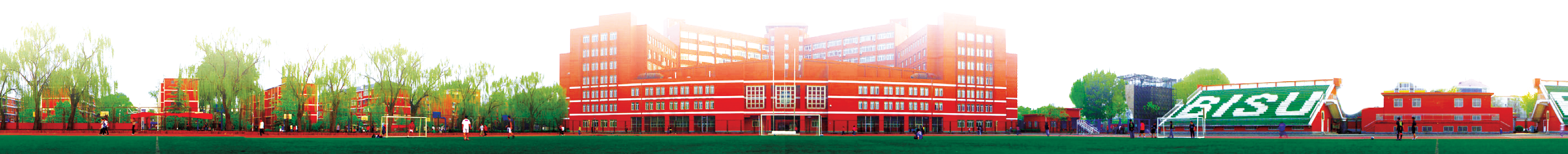
Panorama of the stadium on BISU's main campus

=== Tongzhou Campus ===
In 2013, a branch campus is expected to be built in Tongzhou District, the new City Sub-Center of Beijing. The university president, Zhou Lie, disclosed in January that the new site would be located in Lucheng, neighbouring the east campus of Renmin University and Peking Union Medical College, with only a 20-minute drive to the central campus.

As of March 2013, the university has held conferences and seminars on feasibility analysis of the project, with regard to the 2013—2020 Outline of National Tourism and Leisure released by the State Council in February.

== Academics ==
=== Structure ===
A Discipline in the Beijing International Studies University is a broad administrative concept for categorising related academic units. The disciplinary divisions usually differentiate the degrees awarded. Currently, the academic system of Beijing International Studies University is made up of four disciplines: Arts (languages, literature, cultural studies and philosophy), Business Administration, Economics Sciences and Law and Political Sciences.

Teaching and research at BISU is organized by departments, schools and institutes. Schools may establish subsidiary departments and other subordinate institutions because of the organisational history or operational needs. Institutes are graduate schools that conduct research projects aside of the course plan, usually in collaboration with the municipality government or national institutes (otherwise graduate schools are affiliated to schools and departments themselves). In addition, there are supporting entities for teaching and research, including six teaching and research offices for compulsory subjects, the University Press, and the University Library.

As of 2013, there are about 50 departments, schools and other institutions running the four disciplines of the university. The major academic units are:

- School of English Language, Literature and Culture
- School of Japanese Language, Literature and Culture
- School of Arabic Language, Literature and Culture
- School of Western European Languages
- School of Central European Languages
- School of Oriental Languages
- School of Interpreting and Translation
- Russian Department
- School of Tourism Management
- School of Hospitality Management
- School of Economics, Trade and Event Management
- School of Arts and Humanities
- School of Chinese
- School of Marxism
- School of English Education
- International School of Business
- International School of Law
- School of International Communication
- Institute of International Relations
- School of Non-common Languages
- School of Continuing Education
- School of General Education

=== Organisations ===
==== Institute of Tourism Development ====
Founded in 1984, the Research Institute of Tourism Development is one of the oldest and foremost intelligence units in the field of tourism development planning in China.

Equipped with its three research affiliates, i.e. Center for Strategic Planning, Center for Theoretical Research and Center for Industry Consulting, the Institute cooperates extensively with the National Tourism Administration, local authorities and key industry players, contributing to around 20 provincial and municipal industry development projects including those of the renowned tourism cities of Sanya, Haikou and Zhangjiagang, in addition to more than 50 executive and feasibility reports on national resorts districts, national nature reserve areas and ecotourism destinations, such as the Lake Tai Resort in Suzhou, the Changbai Mountains Natural Reserve in Jilin, and the Pagsum Lake Ecotourism Area in Tibet.

In 1998, the institute became part of the National Database for Tourism Management; since 1999, authorized by the Education Ministry, it starts to provide postgraduate coursework and research programs for Tourism Management, with research directions on theory-based strategic study of the operational mechanisms and policy-making within tourism sectors, and on practice-led tourism planning and development projects, integrating theories from business management, science, sociology and architecture. The institute maintains strong links with China Tourism Academy and leading enterprises within the industry.

==== Institute for Transcultural Studies ====
The Institute for Transcultural Studies (ITS) is a specialized research institution for arts and humanities. Initially founded as Institute for Comparative Literature and Transcultural Studies in 2001, the Institute aims to increase intercultural understanding and to promote global presence of Chinese culture by studying classic and contemporary works on philosophy, art and literature from a cross-cultural scope.

The ITS cooperates extensively with institutions at the forefront of the domestic academia. The National Center for Foreign Literature Studies was co-founded by the Foreign Literature Institute of Chinese Academy of Social Sciences (CASS), and the Center for Aesthetics and Art Education is a cooperation program with the Chinese Aesthetics Society. Other notable ITS research branches include Center for Aesthetics and Philosophy, Center for Comparative Literature and Poetics and Center for Sino-Greco Cultural Studies, all of which enjoy sound relationships with universities and research institutions overseas.

==== Institutes of Linguistics and Applied Linguistics ====
(Chinese and foreign languages)

== Research profiles ==
=== Tourism studies ===
BISU's academic leadership in tourism studies can be traced back to the early 1980s, when the Chinese Tourism Ministry took charge of the university and supported the development of its tourism majors, making it the pioneer in the field of tourism education in China. The university initiated the Cross-Strait Tourism Seminar in 2008, (Note: The Cross-Strait Tourism Seminar, sometimes also the Strait Tourism Sightseeing Symposium.) and has been hosting the China Tourism Development, Beijing Dialogue Forum annually since 2004, with strong support from the Beijing Tourism Administration.

In 2004, the Research Center for Beijing Tourism Development (Chinese: 北京旅游发展研究基地) was established at BISU, funded by the Tourism Administration, the Education Commission and the Planning Office of Philosophy and Social Science (BJPOPSS) of the Beijing government. The center is one of the first BJPOPSS-accredited research institutions and is positioned as the government's think tank, which facilitated the city's tourism planning and development during the Beijing 2008 Summer Olympics. As of 2008, the center has established tourism-themed databases including the information integration platform for China tourism industry, the language material portal for Beijing-based professional tour guides, observatories and databases for tourism impacts and sustainability analysis, etc. In addition, during the period from 2005 to 2012, the Center accomplished around 70 research projects of significance, including the Annual Report of Beijing Tourism Development, the China Tourism Studies and the International Tourism Studies.

In collaboration with the China Tourism Academy, the research arm of the National Tourism Administration, the China Hospitality Industry Research Center (Chinese: 中国饭店产业研究中心) was founded in 2009, being referred to as a research institution "of key industries which ha[s] been selected from the over 1000 academies of tourism all over China". According to the International Journal of Hospitality Management, during the period from 1978 to 2008, BISU is among the top 3 contributors to the academic research on Chinese tourism and hospitality management, and the Research Center Director Professor Gu Huimin is one of the top 8 intensely contributing authors worldwide.

=== Cultural studies ===
The National Institute of Cultural Development (Chinese: 国家文化发展国际战略研究院) is China's first state-level culture industry institute, co-established by the Chinese Culture Ministry and BISU in 2010. The Institute grew out of BISU's Research Center of International Trade in Services and International Cultural Trade, which was founded in 2006, aiming to promote Chinese culture from an economic and trade perspective, and to facilitate the cultural reform of the nation. It remains engaged in academic collaboration at both the domestic and international levels, and has developed into both a research platform for international cultural trade and an educational base for training specialized personnel. In 2013, as the only academic forum of its kind in China, the Annual Forum for International Trade in Services (Beijing), which has been co-hosted by BISU and the China Association of International Trade (CAIT) since 2007, became part of the MOFCOM-hosted 2nd China International Fair for Trade in Service.

In 2012, the Global Media and Cultural Soft Power Laboratory (Chinese: 全球影视与文化软实力实验室) was jointly established by the Chinese Academy of Social Sciences and Beijing International Studies University. It is a research and consulting institution primarily specialized in studies on mass media and cross-platform convergence, and cultural diplomacy development. Focusing on policies and practices associated with soft power, the Laboratory looks into issues of cultural trends and phenomena, media flows, and consumption behaviours on media products—especially in terms of film and television industries—with analytical precision. The Laboratory is currently the only academic organisation on soft power development in China, and is supported by CCTV and the China Publishing Group.

=== International studies ===
In 2012, the MOE Project of Arab Research Center (Chinese: 中国教育部区域和国别研究基地拉伯研究中心) was inaugurated at BISU. It is one of the three university-based Arab studies institutions selected into the MOE Project of International Studies Research Institutes in China. It is to conduct comprehensive studies on the Arab world, reaching out into topics including politics, economics, culture, arts, history, social conditions, religion and humanities; the research force of the center is primarily drawn from research fellows and academic staff of the Department of Arabic Studies, joint by multidisciplinary professionals and the Distinguished Experts, Li Shaoxian, VP of the top-ranked Asian think tank China Institutes of Contemporary International Relations, and Liu Zhentang, former Chinese Ambassador to the Middle East. According to the university president, Zhou Lie, the center is positioned to be both the think tank and the intelligence unit in the fields of academics, personnel development, decision-making consulting and international communication.

In the same year of 2012, the Center for Global Public Opinion and Audience Research (Chinese: 全球舆情与受众研究基地 (Note: Center for Global Public Opinion and Audience Research, sometimes also as the International Public Opinion Research Center.)) was established. It is an academic alliance between BISU and the China Foreign Languages Publishing Administration. Based on comparative research of national/regional profiles, the Center mainly focuses on opinion tracking, public diplomacy studies and the development of international cultural communication.

=== Language studies ===
Although BISU's School of Interpreting and Translation is relatively young (the first students of which commenced in 2007), it is now one of the only four Chinese universities recognized by the international translation studies academy CIUTI. As of 2011, 16 professors and academic staff of BISU have received the Lifetime Achievement Award in Translation (Note: 中国翻译协会资深翻译家荣誉称号, the notion of Lifetime Achievement Award in Translation is available at "TAC celebrates its 30th anniversary in Beijing". Translators Association of China. December 6, 2012.) bestowed by the Translators Association of China (TAC).

In 2011, the Institute of China Translation Development (Chinese: 中国翻译行业发展战略研究院) was set up in BISU. Cooperating with TAC, the institute is the first national research center focused on the translation industry in China. Its expertise lies mainly in theory development and professional practice of translation and interpreting. In 2012, it released the first ever Annual Report on China’s Language Services Industry at the National Conference on Translation, which was regarded as remarkable contribution to the industry. It also seeks collaboration with the industry and international organisations, and is supported by CIUTI and the China Foreign Languages Publishing Administration.

In 2013, to strengthen the partnership a step further, the Training Center for China Translation Industry (Chinese: 中国翻译行业人才培训基地), another TAC-affiliated organisation was also established at BISU.

== Global partnerships ==
To share teaching and research experience and to facilitate student exchanges, the university maintains links with universities and academic institutions on all continents. As of 2013, the university has cooperations with more than 130 global partners. It is also one of the 20 Chinese universities selected to the UNESCO China-Africa collaborative initiative.

=== Inbound study ===
Beijing International Studies University is renowned for its international students education across the country, both in terms of student capacity and teaching quality. In 2002 and 2004, with over 8,000 long-term and 2,000 short-term international students from more than 70 countries studying at the university, BISU was named twice Outstanding Academic Institution for International Students Education by the Education Commission of the government. For the academic year 2013–2014, BISU is one of the only two Beijing-based universities (altogether eight across the nation) entrusted by China Scholarship Council to provide foundation programs to international undergraduate students.

As a higher education institution entitled to admit Chinese Government Scholarship students, BISU provides a wide range of degree programs for students from all over the world, including 20 undergraduate programs and 11 postgraduate programs, all open to Chinese Government Scholarship applications. As of 2007, around 40 percent of the international undergraduates and 20 percent of the non-degree language students received the scholarships per semester, with the highest award level amounting to CN¥9,000. (Note: To give a bit of insight into this, the highest level of awards for domestic students is the National Scholarship, CN¥8,000 per annum.) In addition to the government incentives, the university has established its own merit-based International Scholarships and all the overseas students at BISU are equally entitled to apply.

=== Confucius Institutes ===
- (Mexico) November 22, 2006: Universidad Autónoma de Chihuahua, Chihuahua
- (France) December 11, 2007: PRES Clermont Université, Clermont-Ferrand
- (Morocco) March 27, 2008: Université Mohammed V, Rabat
- (England) April 28, 2008: University of Central Lancashire, Preston

== Student life ==
=== Event highlights ===
- First-Year Welcome Party – Each year, the BISU Union has set time aside to run a welcome party for all new students. It is normally scheduled on the first Sunday evening prior to classes, after the jun xun has finished. Notable societies will put on some performance at the party, including stage play, dubbing, dancing and singing, integrating "first year must-know" elements into their shows.
- German Week – A week-long festival celebrating BISU in the autumn/winter, usually referred to as the Cultural Week of German Speaking Countries. It is hosted by the Student Union of Department of German Studies and entails a variety of events, including an opening ceremony, an annually held inter-university German speech contest, the highlight event MoreFun Wednesday Night Show, a tour of photographic exhibitions, a film night, a themed costume ball and a closing party. It is an interactive display of the diverse culture of German speaking countries including Germany, Austria, Schwizerland, Belgium, Luxembourg and Liechtenstein. Ambassadors from these countries will join the line-up of the opening ceremony, where typical German-style snacks and beverages are served free of charge and a series of micro fairs are held on topics including tourists attractions, sports, education, politics, literature, media, etc.
- Forums – An umbrella term for all the ongoing and long-term communication initiatives hosted by varied academic units of BISU. It currently comprises the Youth Elites Forum, the Boya Forum and the Career Forum, inviting personalities from the media, the political arena and literary and art circles to interact with students. Notable guests include Li Zhaoxing, Zhang Qiyue, Jin Guihua; Wang Meng, Liang Xiaosheng, Yuan Tengfei, Ji Lianhai, Rao Xueman; Joël Bellassen, Lu Jiande; Sa Beining, Han Qiaosheng, Zhang Shaogang, Chun Ni; Wang Gengnian, Sun Yusheng.
- French and Italian Week hosted by the Department of French and Italian Studies.
- Christmas and New Year's Eve Party Night hosted by the SCA BISU.
- Kohaku Uta Gassen hosted by the School of Japanese Language.
- Sing Competition hosted by the BISU Union.
- All that music Live Concert hosted by RAY Music.
- Chinese Debating Competition.

=== Media ===
XiangYu News is the university's student-run news agency. It is supported and supervised by the University Relations, incorporating the major media:

- BISU Television, usually abbreviated as BSTV, the student-run television station at BISU. The biggest project for BSTV each year is to make graduation video that is played during the graduation ceremony.
- Voice of Erwai (VOE, or in pinyin: Èrwài Zhī Shēng), the BISU radio station
- BISU Press Corps, BISU's student-journalists association, responsible for the university publication BISU Newspaper and the online news delivery at BMC, the BISU Media Center.

=== Self-Governance ===
Across the university, there are two major student-led governing bodies: Beijing International Studies University Student Union, usually known as the BISU Union, which is the official representative body of the university students, and the China Youth League BISU (CCYL BISU), which is a student council running on the party pattern. In addition, Students' Community Association BISU (SCA BISU) is another student organisation at the university level, which is in charge of the management of clubs and societies of the university.

All of the three student groups organise inter-university events, ranging from culture festivals and sports races, flea markets and party shows, to career fairs and academic seminars, or volunteering activities and leadership programs, aiming to promote social interactions and community involvement of the students, and to engage both domestic and international students to join and enjoy the BISU family.

=== Clubs and societies ===
Most of the student societies at the university are associated under SCA BISU, initiated by individuals of same interests and hobbies. Application for setting up new societies is open to University students at the beginning of each semester.

Most overseas students find societies for the particular language and culture from where they come from. There are groups for Chinese culture appreciation that are open to all. Academic and profession-oriented societies is another facet of the student clubs, such as the Business Negotiation Club and the International investment & Management Association (IIMA). Besides, in recent years, organisations on leadership development and community engagement has shown phenomenal growth at BISU, especially the AIESEC, the Association for Green Environments and the Warm Hope Volunteering.

There are high-standard university wide sports teams, most notably the flag football team The Bombers, who has had significant performances in the national leagues. Attention is also given to The Soccer BISU and The Basketball BISU, whose half-yearly competitions attracted thousands of audience to the field. Badminton, tennis and ping-pong tournaments are held annually on campus. Besides, there are interest groups for outdoor activities such as running (The Runner), martial arts (The BAMA) and roller skating (S-Power).

In 2009, the Beijing International Studies University Students Art Troupe was established, supervised under CCYL BISU. It acts as the bridge of Chinese performing arts between BISU students, other national universities and the public. The Art Troupe features a wide range of forms of performing arts, comprising the Choir, the Dance Group, the Orchestra and Percussion Group and the Drama and Recitation Group. Besides, there exist arts societies, which operate independently to the Students Art Troupe, which are among the most popular interest groups at BISU, including The Charming Voice (voice acting), The Compass (stage play), The PLUF Crew (dancing) and The RAY Music.

Other notable societies include The Mystery Society, The September (computer), The SSS (bicycle touring), The BISU Photographic Society, The Modelin (fashion catwalk) and The Minor (anime, comics and cosplay).

== People ==
- Chang Zhenming – Chairman of CITIC Group, chairman and Managing Director of CITIC Pacific
- Du Jiang – Vice chairman of China National Tourism Administration
- Gao Hucheng – Minister of Commerce of PRC
- He Guangbei – Vice chairman and chief executive officer of BOC Hong Kong Holdings and Bank of China (Hong Kong)
- Liu Hongyu – Women's 20-Kilometre Race-Walk Champion of the 1999 IAAF World Championships
- Wang Yi – Minister of Foreign Affairs of PRC
- Wu Sike – China's Special Envoy on the Middle East Issue; former Chinese Ambassador to Saudi Arabia and Egypt
- Yuan Yanping – Judo gold medalist of the 2008 and 2012 Summer Paralympics (Women's +70 kg)
- Zhang Jilong – Executive President of Asian Football Federation
- Zhang Yuning (footballer, born 1977) – international soccer player

== See also ==
- Beijing Hospitality Institute
- Tourism Education Press
- Donghua International Travel Agency
- Affiliated High School
