= Cao Weidong =

Chinese university administrator and politician

- 曹卫东

Communist Party Secretary of Beijing Sport University
- In office April 2017 – March 2024
- Preceded by: Yang Hua
- Succeeded by: TBA

President of Beijing Sport University
- In office August 2018 – December 2021
- Preceded by: Chi Jian
- Succeeded by: Zhang Jian

President of Beijing International Studies University
- In office November 2014 – May 2017
- Preceded by: Zhou Lie
- Succeeded by: Ji Jinbiao

Personal details
- Born: May 1968 (age 58) Funing County, Liaoning, China
- Party: Chinese Communist Party
- Education: Peking University; Graduate School of Chinese Academy of Social Sciences; Goethe University Frankfurt

Chinese name
- Simplified Chinese: 曹卫东
- Traditional Chinese: 曹衛東
Transcriptions
Standard Mandarin
- Hanyu Pinyin: Cáo Wèidōng

Cao Weidong (Chinese: 曹卫东; born May 1968) is a former Chinese university administrator and politician who served as president of Beijing International Studies University from 2014 to 2017 and president of Beijing Sport University from 2018 to 2021. As of March 2024 he was under investigation by China's top graft busters. He was involved in the corruption case of Chinese football.

== Early life and education ==
Cao was born in Funing County, Liaoning, in May 1968. He received his master's degree and doctor's degree from Peking University in 1989 and 1993, respectively. He went on to receive his doctor's degree in 1998 at the Graduate School of Chinese Academy of Social Sciences. He also studied at Goethe University Frankfurt between January 1999 and October 2000.

== Career ==
Cao joined the Chinese Communist Party (CCP) in February 1996. He worked for a short time as an associate research fellow at the Institute of Literature, Chinese Academy of Social Sciences between October 2000 and September 2001. In October 2001, he became associate professor of Beijing Normal University, rising to full professor in July 2004. In 2014 he moved to Beijing International Studies University as its president, and served until May 2017. In 2017, he was transferred to Beijing Sport University and appointed party secretary, the top political position in the university. He also served as its president from June 2018 to December 2021. He is also the director of the Cadre Training Center of the General Administration of Sport of China and dean of the Coach College.

== Downfall ==
On 15 March 2024, he was put under investigation for alleged "serious violations of discipline and laws" by the Central Commission for Discipline Inspection (CCDI), the party's internal disciplinary body, and the National Supervisory Commission, the highest anti-corruption agency of China.

Educational offices
Preceded by Zhou Lie	President of Beijing International Studies University; 2014–2017	Succeeded by Ji Jinbiao
Preceded by Chi Jian (池建)	President of Beijing Sport University; 2018–2021	Succeeded by Zhang Jian (张剑)
Party political offices
Preceded by Yang Hua (杨桦)	Communist Party Secretary of Beijing Sport University; 2017–2024	Succeeded by TBA
