= BSU =

BSU may refer to:

== Universities ==
- Baku State University
- Baikal State University, Irkutsk, Russia
- Buryat State University, Ulan-Ude, Russia
- Ball State University, Indiana, USA
- Batangas State University Apolinario R. Apacible School of Fisheries (BatSU)
- Bath Spa University, UK
- Beijing Sport University
- Belarusian State University
- Bemidji State University
- Benguet State University (BengSU)
- Boise State University, Idaho, USA
- Bowie State University, Maryland, USA
- Bukidnon State University (BukSU)
- Bulacan State University (BulSU)
- Bridgewater State University, Massachusetts, USA

== Other uses ==
- Bangladesh Students Union, a political organization in Bangladesh
- Baluchistan States Union, a province of Pakistan that existed from 1952 to 1955
- Baptist Student Union
- Behavioral Science Unit, the former name for the Federal Bureau of Investigation's Behavioral Analysis Unit
- BISU Union, the Student Union of Beijing International Studies University (BISU)
- British Seafarers' Union
- Britannia Staff Union
- Federal Bureau for Maritime Casualty Investigation (Bundesstelle für Seeunfalluntersuchung, BSU)
- $\operatorname{BSU}(n)$, Classifying space for special unitary group
- $\operatorname{BSU}$, Classifying space for infinite special unitary group
