= Du Jiang (politician) =

Chinese politician (born 1964)

- Chinese: 杜江
- Hanyu Pinyin: Dù Jiāng
Transcriptions
Standard Mandarin
- Hanyu Pinyin: Dù Jiāng

Du Jiang (pinyin: Dù Jiāng, born in November 1964) is a Vice Chairman of China National Tourism Administration (CNTA). He is in charge of the Department of Tourism Promotion and International Liaison of the CNTA, and is responsible for managing tourism-related affairs in Hong Kong, Macao and Taiwan. He also chairs the China Tourism Academy and CNTA representative offices in foreign countries, and liaises at China Tourism Association and the Cross-Strait Tourism Exchange Association. In addition, he is the Honorary Vice Chairman of Global Tourism Economy Forum.

Du Jiang earned his PhD in economics at Nankai University, and is specialized in research on tourism management. Before he assumed office at CNTA, he served successively at Beijing International Studies University (President, 1999) and the Beijing Tourism Administration (director-general, 2006).
