= Institute of Intercultural Management and Communication =

French Grande École

ISIT, Paris-Panthéon-Assas University
- Institut Supérieur d’Interprétation et de Traduction
- Type: Management school
- Established: 1957
- Parent institution: Paris-Panthéon-Assas University
- Affiliations: CGE, FESIC, CIUTI, LASER
- Director: Tamym Abdessemed
- Academic staff: 180
- Students: 850
- Location: Arcueil, France
- Campus: Urban
- Language: Arabic, Chinese, French, English, German, Italian, Portuguese, Russian, Spanish
- Website: www.isit-paris.fr

The Institute of Intercultural Management and Communication or ISIT, formerly Institut Supérieur d’Interprétation et de Traduction, is a French Grande École of Paris-Panthéon-Assas University.

In 1957, ISIT was founded as an association. This school offers diploma programmes in Intercultural Management and Communication, Translation, and Conference Interpreting. Graduated students from ISIT find employment in various professional fields.

ISIT is a member of CIUTI (Conférence Internationale des Instituts Universitaires de Traducteurs et d’Interprètes (International Permanent Conference of University Institutes of Translators and Interpreters)), FESIC (Fédération d’Écoles Supérieures d’Ingénieurs et de Cadres) (French Engineering and Business Management Schools Network) and CGE (Conférence des Grandes Ecoles), a non-profit association of engineering schools, management schools and higher education institutions offering other specialities.

== History ==
1957: establishment of ISIT (Institut Supérieur d’Interprétation et de Traduction – Higher Education Institute of Translation and Interpreting) as part of the Catholic University of Paris, in the same year as the Treaty of Rome. The goal was to train professionals to act as mediators of understanding and culture.

1981: ISIT became a member of CIUTI (International Permanent Conference of University Institutes of Translators and Interpreters), which brings together the world's top educational institutions; then of FESIC (French Engineering and Business Management Schools Network), in 2005.

2006: ISIT's diploma became a 5-year diploma, accredited by the French government.

2008: ISIT changed names, becoming the Institute of Intercultural Management and Communication. This better conveys the range of areas in which its graduates find work. Over the years, the school indeed expanded its programmes to adapt to the transformations of the professional world and companies’ needs. Since then, ISIT has offered programmes in intercultural management and communication. Nonetheless, the school had retained its original initials: ISIT.

2009: ISIT's accreditation was renewed. The school joined the network of European Master's in Translation (EMT), set up by the European Commission.

2010: ISIT and the United Nations signed a Memorandum of Cooperation to encourage access for ISIT students to linguistic careers within the UN. The schools joined the CGE (Conférence des Grandes Ecoles) and signed a protocol to participate in the Banque d’épreuves littéraires (arts and literature examinations) given by the Écoles Normales Supérieures.

2011: ISIT launched the first international Cordée de la Réussite, a French initiative to encourage access to higher education for young people from disadvantaged backgrounds. The school signed a "double degree" agreement with Beijing Language and Culture University, and teamed up with HEDAC (a law school at the Versailles Court of Appeal) to create a customised training course in intercultural legal communication.

2013: ISIT's accreditation was renewed for the postgraduate diploma programmes in translation (the specialisations in Intercultural Communication and Translation and in Intercultural Management) and conference interpretation. Accreditation was also renewed for the language & legal studies degree.

2015: ISIT opened new facilities in Arcueil thereby leaving Paris.

== Organisation ==
=== Staff directory ===
- Director: Tamym Abdessemed
- Administration and Financial Office: Amanda Lovell
- Education Office: Frédéric Gulin
- Corporate Relations and Communications Office: Nathalie Schwartz

=== Location ===
ISIT in Arcueil, outside of Paris. Some lectures and research seminaries as well as continuing education sessions take place in Paris. To meet the growing number of ISIT students, a new building (Campus ISIT Arcueil) was opened in Fall 2015 at 23 - 25 avenue Jeanne d'Arc (94110 Arcueil) and includes classrooms, the head office, administration and finance department, library, lecture halls and the IT department.

== Education ==
ISIT's aim to train intercultural professionals, who master at least three languages, of which French and English are mandatory. Other languages taught at ISIT are: Spanish, German, Italian, and Mandarin Chinese. Arab is also part of linguistic combinations from Fall 2014 on. Any other language master by a student, even if not taught at ISIT, can be accredited at the end of the studies.

=== Management, Communication, Translation ===
The Management Communication Translation Master consists of a three-year undergraduate programme (for which a bachelor's degree in not awarded) followed by a two-year graduate programme leading to a diploma in translation with different specialisations. A compulsory one-semester exchange programme with a foreign partner university is part of the third year. After three years of undergraduate studies, this program offers three two-year diploma specialisations:

- Intercultural Management
- Intercultural Communication and Translation
- European Master's in Specialised Translation

=== Language & Legal / Lawyer linguist studies ===
This programme is for students wishing to pursue a career in international law. ISIT offers a four-year foreign language programme, culminating in a Language & Legal Studies degree. At the same time, students pursue a law degree at Sceaux or FACO. ISIT has a partnership with the Faculté Jean Monnet in Sceaux and the FACO (Faculté Autonome Co-gérée).

=== Conference interpreting programme ===
ISIT trains professional conference interpreters for high-level work in both international organisations and in the private sector. The Conference Interpreting programme is a full-time two-year postgraduate diploma programme. As graduated studies, the diploma in conference Interpreting is open only to holders of a bachelor's degree and after a whole year abroad.

=== Continuing education ===
ISIT offers continuing education programmes which address companies, professionals, administrations, international organisations in multicultural and multilingualism areas:

- Translation
- Conference interpreting
- Intercultural Management
- Intercultural Communication
- Linguistic strengthening on keys points

== Research ==
Through its research centre, the CRATIL (the Centre for Applied Research in Translation, Interpreting and Language), ISIT takes part to small research projects in the areas of translation science, multilingual communication and intercultural management. Students work on research projects and collaborate with research professors, and PhD candidates connected with international and European partners of CRATIL.

== Associations ==
=== Junior ISIT ===
Founded in 2000 as Junior Trad’, the association became Junior ISIT in 2009. It then became a member of the French National Confederation of Junior-Enterprises (CNJE) in 2010. In 2013, it was granted Junior Enterprise status, at the general Meeting of Junior Enterprises. Junior ISIT offers translation work in the languages studied at ISIT (German, English, Chinese, Spanish and Italian) and market studies, as well as intercultural marketing and liaison interpreting assignments. Most of the customers are international companies. Junior ISIT was awarded as the Most Promising JE of the Year in 2015 by Jade - European Confederation of Junior Enterprises.

=== The Student Office ===
ISIT's Students Office forges ties between students and the administration and organises activities throughout the year. These include induction weekends, parties, trips, cultural events, and so on. One of the Office's main goals is to promote communication between students of different languages and cultures.

=== AlumnISIT Association ===
AlumnISIT is the new association that gathers ISIT graduates. It aims at facilitating graduates entry into professional life by encouraging networking with ISIT's graduates. The association includes 5,000 alumni.

== International ==
=== Networks ===
ISIT is a member of several international networks:

- CIUTI (International Permanent Conference of University Institutes of Translators and Interpreters)
- EMCI (European Masters in Conference Interpreting), a consortium of partner Universities offering a Masters course in conference interpreting.
- EMT (European Master's in Translation). The EMT is a partnership project between the European Commission and higher-education institutions offering master's level translation programmes.
- METS (Master Européen en Traduction Spécialisée) European Master in specialized Translation)

The school works also with AIIC (Association of Conference Interpreters)’s Network. It enjoys excellent relations with the American (AMCHAM), Spanish (COCEF), German and Italian chambers of commerce in France and students can take exams of the chambers of commerce in their respective language. ISIT is also part of CNCCEF's network (the National Committee of French Foreign Trade Advisors)

=== Student exchange programmes ===
All ISIT students are required to spend time studying at a partner university under the aegis of the Erasmus+ Programme or bilateral agreements. This exchange takes place during their 2nd and 3rd year for the Management, Communication and Translation programme (MCT).

Language & Legal Studies students may spend one of their undergraduate years in a foreign law school. In exchange ISIT welcomes every year foreign students from partner universities.
