= Tourism Education Press =

- Parent company: Beijing International; Studies University
- Founded: December 31, 1987
- Country of origin: China
- Headquarters location: Beijing
- Publication types: Books, magazines and academic journals
- Nonfiction topics: Tourism and Foreign languages
- Official website: www.tepcb.com

Tourism Education Press (TEP) is a university press affiliated to Beijing International Studies University (BISU) of China. It was founded in November 1987 as part of the national initiative to promote the domestic tourism industry and tourism education.

== History ==
The history of the press dates back to the 1980s, during which the strong links of the university to the Chinese tourism ministry CNTA significantly contributed to the establishment of TEP.

In 1978, the Chinese government introduced the reform and opening up and put great emphasis on the integration into the global market. In order to improve the English proficiency of the service personnel, especially in terms of the tourism industry, for three consecutive years, the CNTA consigned the language training responsibility to Beijing International Studies University and in 1981, the Department of Tourism was jointly established by the university and CNTA.

In March 1983, the university became directly affiliated to the Ministry and clearly positioned itself as a tertiary institution for tourism education, specialised in tourism translation and interpreting, tourism trade and tourism management. In 1987, the then Chairman of the CNTA Han Kehua took up the post of the university president. In the same year, the Tourism Education Press was established in November, and because of the university's direct affiliation to the CNTA, the press was also recognised as a national or central publishing house.

== Key dates ==
- November 17, 1987: Tourism Education Press was officially granted publication license by the GAPP.
- December 31, 1987: Establishment Ceremony was held.
- 2003: The Press commenced setting up an online platform of its own, initially called China Tourism Education.
- 2005: The Press cooperated with the Founder Group and established its online trading system.

== Statistics ==
	General publications (year-on-year changes)				Textbooks/teaching materials(year-on-year changes)			
	Total	%	New	%	Total	%	New	%
1998	67	-	26	-	45	-	7	-
2010	229	-	128	-	90	-	28	-

As of 2007, the Tourism Education Press has been awarded 23 book prizes for 41 of its publications, and 109 of all TEP publications have been selected into the Textbooks of Nation project, Distinguished Textbooks projects or nominated for other academic awards by the Ministry of Education and the municipal government.

== Alliances ==
Within the domestic publishing world, the Tourism Education Press is one of the foremost publishers in terms of tourism-related publications, along with the China Travel and Tourism Press.

In 2012, TEP established formal relationship with the China Tourism Academy for further development. The cooperation was referred to as Academic Community, in the sense that the press would facilitate the development of tourism discipline as an academic intermediary, while the research projects conducted by the academy would provide the press with publication sources.

== See also ==
- Beijing International Studies University
- List of tourism-related institutions in China
- Publishing industry in China
