= List of tourism-related institutions in China =

This is a list of government bodies, agencies, institutions and other corporations related to the tourism in China.

== Industry ==
- China National Tourism Administration (CNTA, Chinese: 中国国家旅游局), is a government agency in charge of tourism. The agency is directly affiliated to the State Council.
- China Tourism Association, or known as the China National Tourism Institute (Chinese: 中国旅游协会), is the first industry association for tourism in China. It is established in 1986, directly affiliated to the CNTA.

== Academic and education ==
- Beijing Tourism Institute (Chinese: 北京旅游学院), officially known as the School of Tourism of Beijing Union University (Chinese: 北京联合大学旅游学院), the former satellite campus of Beijing International Studies University taken over by BUU in 1983.
- China Tourism Academy (CTA, Chinese: 中国旅游研究院), established in 2008, is a research institute under the CNTA. The institute is located in Beijing, China.
- China Tourism Institute (Chinese: 中国旅游学院) refers to Beijing International Studies University, especially during the 1980s and the 1990s.
- China Tourism Education (CTE, Chinese: 中国旅游协会旅游教育分会), established in 2008 under the China Tourism Association. It is merged from the National Association of Secondary Tourism Education and National Association of Tertiary Tourism Education, which were established in 1980s.
- China Tourism Management Institute (CTMT, Chinese: 中国旅游管理干部学院), a TAFE agency for vocational and educational training, located in Tianjin, China, established in 1987 under the CNTA.
- Macao University of Tourism is a public university in Macau, China. It is administered by the Secretary for Social Affairs and Culture of the Macau SAR Government.

== Publishing houses ==
- China Tourism News Office (Chinese: 中国旅游报社) is the newspaper office affiliated with CNTA. It publishes the newspaper China Tourism News and runs its e-version online website. Besides, it established Top Tour (Chinese: 第一旅游网), a service platform for domestic travels.
- China Travel and Tourism Press (CTTP, Chinese: 中国旅游出版社), established in 1975 under the CNTA, is China's biggest professional publishing house for tourism.
- Tourism Education Press (TEP, Chinese: 旅游教育出版社), established in 1987, is the university press of Beijing International Studies University.
