= Gu Xiaoyuan =

Chinese politician and university administrator (born 1965)

- 顾晓园

Communist Party Secretary of Beijing International Studies University
- In office July 2016 – October 2022
- Preceded by: Feng Pei
- Succeeded by: Chang Yu

Personal details
- Born: December 1965 (age 60) Yangzhou, Jiangsu, China
- Party: Chinese Communist Party (1985–2023; expelled)
- Education: Beijing Normal University; Beijing University of Technology

Chinese name
- Simplified Chinese: 顾晓园
- Traditional Chinese: 顧曉園
Transcriptions
Standard Mandarin
- Hanyu Pinyin: Gù Xiǎoyuán

Gu Xiaoyuan (Chinese: 顾晓园; born December 1965) is a former Chinese politician and university administrator. As of October 2022 she was under investigation by China's top anti-graft watchdog. Previously she served as party secretary of Beijing International Studies University.

== Early life and education ==
Born in Yangzhou, Jiangsu, in December 1965, Gu graduated from Beijing Normal University and Beijing University of Technology.

== Career ==
Gu joined the Chinese Communist Party (CCP) in December 1985, and entered the workforce in July 1988.

Gu once served as secretary of Beijing University of Technology of the Communist Youth League of China and deputy director of Beijing Municipal Tourism Bureau.

In January 2011, Gu was appointed head of the Publicity Department of the CCP Fengtai District Committee and was admitted to member of the CCP Fengtai District Committee, the district's top authority. She was deputy party secretary of Fengtai District in May 2013, in addition to serving as secretary of the Political and Legal Affairs Commission.

In July 2016, Gu was named party secretary of Beijing International Studies University, a position she held until October 2022.

== Downfall ==
On 26 October 2022, Gu was put under investigation for alleged "serious violations of discipline and laws" by the Central Commission for Discipline Inspection (CCDI), the party's internal disciplinary body, and the National Supervisory Commission, the highest anti-corruption agency of China.

On 8 June 2023, she was expelled from the CCP and dismissed from public office. On 10 July 2023, she was indicted on suspicion of accepting bribes and corruption by the Beijing Municipal People's Procuratorate.

On 29 March 2024, she was sentenced to 13 years and fined one million yuan for taking bribes and corruption by the Beijing No. 3 Intermediate People's Court. Her all property gained from the bribery and corruption would be turned over to the national treasury.

Educational offices
Preceded by Feng Pei	Communist Party Secretary of Beijing International Studies University; 2016–2022	Succeeded by Chang Yu
