= Welcome Chinese =

Chinese hospitality company

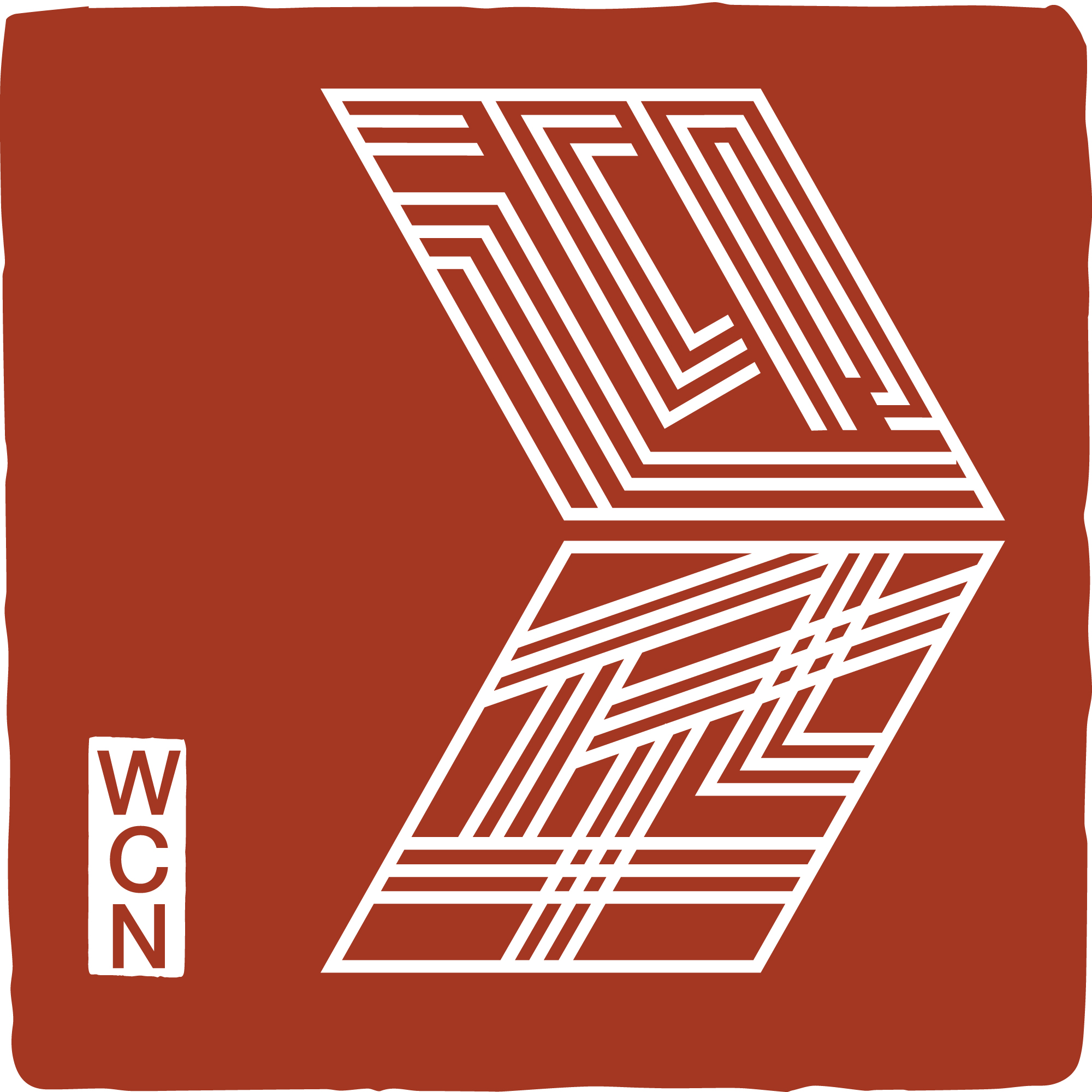
Welcome Chinese logo since 2024

Welcome Chinese is a hospitality standard, brand and company founded in 2013 and headquartered in China. It was developed by the marketing and communications firm Select Holding Ltd, together with the China Tourism Academy (CTA), board of the China National Tourism Administration (CNTA). Company's purpose is to help Chinese tourists to feel more comfortable, travel easier and feel welcome overseas. Another goal is to help global hotels/resorts, museums, amusement parks, transportation hubs and all other sightseeing and tourist destinations to reach China's market through promotional activities.

== History ==
The original purpose of Jacopo Sertoli, Select Holding's CEO, when opening the China office in 2010 was to export to China the business model of Select Italy, a US-based tour operator focused on high-end tourism to Italy. Because of this experience, Welcome Chinese was able to start its activities with a background in international tourism.

Nevertheless, encouraging Chinese people to travel to Italy proved to be a formidable task. To improve the involvement of tourism businesses in Western countries, the company started by promoting the broadcasting of CCTV News, the bilingual channel of the Chinese State television, CCTV, as an in-room amenity in hotels. Although it started out as a secondary business, it lit the first spark for the Welcome Chinese concept: to certify hotels and other tourism businesses in return for providing services tailored specifically to Chinese tastes and habits. A new marketing strategy was being developed at that time, with single hotel chains like Preferred, Hilton, Marriott, Accor, and InterContinental independently starting their own programs to cater to Chinese visitors. These programs range from guaranteeing Mandarin-speaking staff at the hotel and providing Chinese-style breakfasts to accepting UnionPay credit cards.

It was the signing of the partnership between Select Holding and CTA, in the middle of 2013, that established the necessary basis for the constitution of Welcome Chinese. As it officially states, CTA aims to establish itself as think tank specialized in promoting the development of China's tourism industry. It provided an influential endorsement, thanks to its position as a specialized institute directly under CNTA. CTA agreed to promote the Welcome Chinese project and to privilege participants who have implemented the standard by recommending them to the Chinese travel industry.

== The launch ==
The official launch of Welcome Chinese took place on October 18, 2013, at the National Stadium in Beijing. This followed the additional support that Select Holding gained from state-owned companies like China Central Television (CCTV) and China UnionPay. An agreement with Hilton Worldwide was then secured so that the hotels within its Huanying program could be involved in the Welcome Chinese program. This same period also saw the founding of Welcome Chinese Ltd, based in Hong Kong, while the operational activities were kept in the Select Holding's offices in Shanghai.

The Welcome Chinese Certification (WCC), as introduced during the event in Beijing, was a program for which non-Chinese hotels can apply. At that time, the Certification was divided into three levels – Bronze, Silver and Gold – according to the quality and number of services that tourism businesses can guarantee to Chinese guests. First business plans for the medium term, with the aim of developing and adapting the standard towards restaurants, airports, museums and shops were considered shortly afterwards.

Together with the brand, the B2B and B2C Welcome Chinese website was also launched in Beijing. Before going under total renovation, it listed all the certified hotels in order to provide accurate and up-to-date information for the Chinese traveler. The B2C section allowed travelers to search for accommodations outside China, filtering the results by services – the so-called “Welcome Chinese services” – as well as by price and location.

Starting from 2014, the Project was introduced to customers and travel agents during various tourism fairs in China. Among them, CMT, COTTM, WTF, BITE, CITIE and WTM in London. Roadshows aimed at get in touch with local tour operators were held in 2nd-tier cities such as Wuhan, Xi'an, Kunming, Chengdu and Chongqing.

Welcome Chinese logo 2013-2016

== Further developments ==
On June 26, 2014, Welcome Chinese was presented in front of a non-Chinese audience for the first time. On the occasion – a press conference in Sala Stampa Estera in Rome – Antonello Perricone, CEO of the rail company Nuovo Trasporto Viaggiatori (NTV), and Lorenzo Lo Presti, CEO of Aeroporti di Roma (ADR) were awarded the Welcome Chinese Certification. It was the first time that a rail company or a hub – the Leonardo da Vinci–Fiumicino Airport in Rome – got the award after introducing services aimed at Chinese travelers.

On February 9, 2015, Welcome Chinese held a seminar in Abu Dhabi in front of the representatives of the local hospitality industry. Among the panelists, attended Dai Bin, President of CTA, and Jasem Al Darmaki, Deputy Director General at Abu Dhabi Tourism and Culture Authority (TCA). The event celebrated the successfully certification of 20 hotels in Abu Dhabi, a shopping center and two local entertainment parks.

Also in February, Aéroports de Paris (AdP) signed a deal with Welcome Chinese in order to obtain the Red Certificate for Paris’ Charles De Gaulle Airport. For AdP was present Mathieu Daubert, retail director. This was made possible thanks to new services that AdP, the society that manages the hub, have introduced to make the transit of Chinese travelers through the airport more comfortable.

In April 2015, during the COTTM B2B travel fair in Beijing, Welcome Chinese announced a new partnership with InterContinental Hotels Group, bestowing the Gold Certification to 83 of its structures on opening the way to further cooperation. Kenneth Macpherson, chief executive of Greater China region for IHG, was present at the ceremony. On the same occasion, the Red Certification of Trenitalia, the first railway company in Italy for the transportation of people and wares, was made public, together with Maurizio Del Santoro, Director of Global Marketing. The new services for Mandarin speaking travelers involve high-speed lines and stations of major towns in Italy. In June 2015 followed the Red Certification of Museo Ferrari, in Maranello, and the agreement with NH Hotel Group to release the Gold Certification to 15 hotels of the Spanish chain in Italy. During the summer months, the archaeological park in Sicily Valle dei Templi, Rome's MAXXI and the amusement park Cinecittà World. also followed. Previously, another amusement park, Yas Waterworld Abu Dhabi - belonging to Farah Experiences LLC - received the Red Certification.

For what concerns luxury outlets, by 2015 The Galleria, Al Maryah Island and The Mall, in Italy, were certified.

On November 27, 2015, the Welcome Chinese program and certification were introduced in Portugal. The seminar, co-hosted by the Portuguese Tourism Institute and the China Tourism Academy and held in Lisbon, was an official event involving banks and the Chinese-Portuguese Chamber of Commerce, plus Beijing's ambassador in Lisbon. It was the occasion for officials from both sides to discuss the current situation and the prospects of the tourism industry in the two countries in order to promote further development.

== 2016 ==
By that time, the company counted 300 businesses certified as Welcome Chinese. Verona Arena and Maiella National Park, both in Italy, were among the relevant tourism businesses certified during 2016. The same year saw the beginning of a project called “DeltaPo”, aimed at developing the area of Po (river)’s delta as a whole destination, with consideration for the natural, cultural and commercial aspects. The shopping mall, located in Occhiobello, opened in April 2017.

Following Portugal, on March 16, 2016, the firm was introduced in Brazil, during a seminar in Brasilia's Federal Senate House, Brazil. Gilson Lira (Brazilian Tourism Institute, Director of Competitive Intelligence and Tourism Promotion Institute of Embratur), Zhong Guang Liele (CTA, vice-president) and Jacopo Sertoli (Welcome Chinese President), were among the panelists. The event represented the debut of the company in South America.

In middle 2016, Welcome Chinese was selected by the European Travel Commission to provide support on the occasion of the World Bridge Tourism initiative. Such initiative aims at enhancing the awareness as Europe as a destination before the 2018 EU-China Tourism Year begins. The World Bridge Tourism project is carried out by ETC and the European Travel Association (ETOA) that aims to grow the number of Chinese visitors to Europe by encouraging stronger business ties between European and Chinese tourism businesses. The initiative includes a conference as well as business workshops that bring European tourism suppliers and Chinese tour operators together, first for two days in Shanghai in conjunction with ITB China fair, and later in the fall of 2017, doing a similar round of events on European soil.

== The Welcome Chinese Certification ==
The two levels of the Welcome Chinese Certification consist of a progression of required services aimed at Chinese guests. Apart, there is the Red Certificate.

- The Jade level is given in return for the broadcasting of at least two Mandarin-speaking television channels, of a kettle and tea set provided in the rooms, as well as the acceptance of China UnionPay, which is the only domestic bank card organization in the People's Republic of China. Furthermore, a free Wi-Fi connection must be granted within the structure
- The Gold level requires more demanding services: at least a Mandarin-speaking member on the hotel staff, some traditional Chinese food for breakfast and the provision of a “Welcome Kit” for the visitor. It consists of printed information – in Mandarin – to inform him about the location, the touristic spots in the area and the hotel itself
- The Red Certificate is the special acknowledgement that Welcome Chinese, on behalf of the China Tourism Academy, has designed for services related to transportation, such as airports and railway companies.
