= Alain Tasso =

French poet

- Born: 22 July 1962 (age 64); Beirut, Lebanon
- Occupations: Poet painter essayist
- Writing career
- Language: French
- Period: 20th century 21st century
- Notable awards: Croix d'or de Jérusalem; Chevalier de l'Ordre Patriarcal de la Sainte Croix de Jérusalem; Chevalier des Arts et des Lettres
- Website: www.alaintasso.com

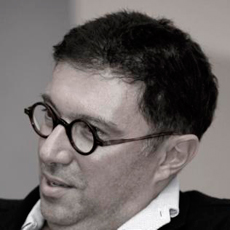
Alain Tasso

Alain Tasso (born July 22, 1962 in Beirut) is a French poet, painter and essayist. An autodidact, his prolific intense literary work is largely acclaimed by critics.

== Biography ==
Tasso attended high school at the Grand Lycée Franco-Libanais de Beyrouth, but refused to sit for his baccalaureate exam, and decided to study accounting instead. He remained in that field only for a few years.

Grandly interested in antiquities, art objects, classical music, especially sacred baroque music, Tasso, who had started playing the piano at five, opened in 1987 "L'insolite", an art gallery. He specialized in both Art Nouveau and Oriental art, and began drawing miniatures and calligraphy. Two years later, as the violent conflicts of the Lebanese civil war ravaged the country, he was forced to shut down gallery. He worked between 1992 and 2000 as a freelancer for numerous French and Arabic magazines and daily papers in Beirut, such as L'Orient Le Jour, and published in 1993 a youth poem collection featuring a preface written by the Lebanese poet Said Akl. In 1996, Tasso was promoted Chevalier de l'Ordre Patriarcal de la Sainte Croix de Jérusalem, an eminent Oriental Catholic distinction. In 1998, he participated in a collective exhibition for the fiftieth anniversary of the Universal Declaration of Human Rights, and as of following year, started teaching the postgraduate "Aesthetics" course at the Institut d'études scéniques, audiovisuelles et cinématographiques (IESAV - The Scenic, Audiovisual and Cinematographic Institute) of the Saint Joseph University in Beirut. Later on, he was asked to lecture in several departments of the Faculty of Humanities at the same university (intercultural competence, art history, fine arts, cultural communication. Since 1995, he participated in numerous painting exhibitions, and his art evolved from an abstract Arabic calligraphy to a Sufi style, all the way to a dense and monochromatic black vision.

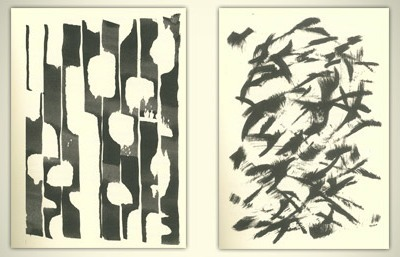
Calligraphy drawings

In 2001, Tasso founded along with the Lebanese critic Joseph Tarrab "Péristyles", an artistic and literary publishing outlet at the Saint Joseph University. In 2003, a study on the "Neige écarlate" ranked him with poets Yves Bonnefoy and Paul Celan. Bonnefoy wrote him after reading one of his publications: "Thank you for this beautiful book. Your Intailles makes us think…".

In 2005 he was promoted to Chevalier des Arts et des Lettres by the French Government and featured in 2008 in the anthology Poésies de langue française published by Seghers Editions.

Alain Tasso is the author of more than ten poem collections published on fine paper, and illustrated by Tasso himself or with paintings for Raphael, Michelangelo, Leonardo da Vinci, Van der Weyden (Retables pour des murs en papier, 2001), and Egon Schiele (Sang des neiges et autres poèmes, 2002). He is also the author of several essays on "ethics" as well as on "image and power" in a dehumanized contemporary society (Les fins de l'image, 2009; Encore ce peu d'images malgré tout, 2011).

His early poetry transitioned from mysticism (Les lampes d'écume, 1999) to expressionism (Fragments chaotiques, 2000; Retables pour des murs en papier, 2001; Sang des neiges et autres poèmes, 2002; Intailles, Te Deum pour un requiem du temps, 2004). His later publications featured a more condensed literary style (De neige et de pierres, Poèmes pour l'improbable, 2005; Assomption d'une autre saison, 2005; Paysages de flot précédé de Sommeil des Ancolies, 2009; Brisants comme dictame d'un monde trépassé, 2010), leading critics to associate his work with the "Poetry of the Prensence" movement.

In October 2010, the publishing firm "Les éditions de la Revue Phénicienne" released an anthology entitled Alain Tasso, preceded by eleven studies and critical texts.

He started teaching in 2011 at the Lebanese Academy of Fine Arts (Académie libanaise des Beaux-Arts, ALBA). He is also the author of numerous artist books.

== Talking about the Arab Spring ==
In the frame of the European Parliament in Brussels, Alex Taylor hosted Alain Tasso as the special guest of Euronews "I-Talk" program. Chosen from the Arab World, Tasso gave an interview on the Arab Spring. Recorded in French, and broadcast from July 14 to July 21, 2011 on Euronews international channels, the talk was also dubbed and translated in the ten languages of the channel, namely French, English, German, Italian, Spanish, Portuguese, Turkish, Russian, Arabic and Persian.

== Works ==
=== in la Collection Les blés d'or ===
- Les lampes d'écume, 1999 (author's art with watercolor paintings)
- Fragments chaotiques, 2000 (author's art)
- Le champ de l'hypostase, 2000 (author's art)
- Retables pour des murs en papier, 2001 (drawings by Michelangelo, Raphael, Watteau, Delacroix, Leonardo da Vinci, Van der Weyden, Dürer and Rodin)
- Sang des neiges et autres poèmes, 2002 (paintings by Egon Schiele) with a CD entitled: L'exégèse du souffle (Reciting of 5 poem collections by Alain Tasso accompanied with music)
- Intailles, Te deum pour un requiem du temps, 2004 (author's art)
- De neige et de pierres, poèmes pour l'improbable, 2005 (photographs by Rudy Bou Chebel)
- Assomption d'une autre saison, 2005 (author's inks)
- Paysages de Flot précédé de Sommeil des ancolies, 2009 (wood engraving by Nicolas Eekman)
- Brisants comme dictame d'un monde trépassé, 2010 (ten poems and icons)

=== in les éditions de Revue Phénicienne ===
- Alain Tasso, 2010 (collective with eleven critic texts by various specialists and poets, and followed by an anthology of poems, proses and inks)

=== in les éditions Seghers ===
- Poésies de langue française, 144 poètes de langue française autour du monde, 2008 (anthology presented by Stéphane Bataillon, Sylvestre Clancier and Bruno Doucey, pages 361; 362; 454)

=== in les Éditions Gallimard ===
- Les très riches heures du livre pauvre, 2011 (Daniel Leuwers, pages 51; 67; 69; 88; 94; 196)

=== Essays ===
- L'homme a le mal de l'homme, sur la peinture de Egon Schiele, Les blés d'or estetica, 2002
- Au-delà du gestaltisme, Khalil Gibran un pinceau de larmes, in Gibran K. Gibran pionnier de la Renaissance à venir, Conference Report, 2006, Université Saint-Esprit de Kaslik, pages 143-149
- Une eau dans ses braises, preface of the exhibition catalogue of Ayman Baalbaki, Agial Gallery, Beirut, 2008
- Les fins de l'image, Les blés d'or estetica, 2009. Conference in the course of the "Images and Ethics" Symposium (colloque « Images et éthique »), IESAV, Saint Joseph University, December 2008 (Also published in the conference report "Regards", number 11, 2009)
- Encore ce peu d'images malgré tout, Les blés d'or estetica, Spring 2011
