= Virtual University of Pakistan =

Public university in Pakistan

- ورچوئل یونیورسٹی آف پاکستان
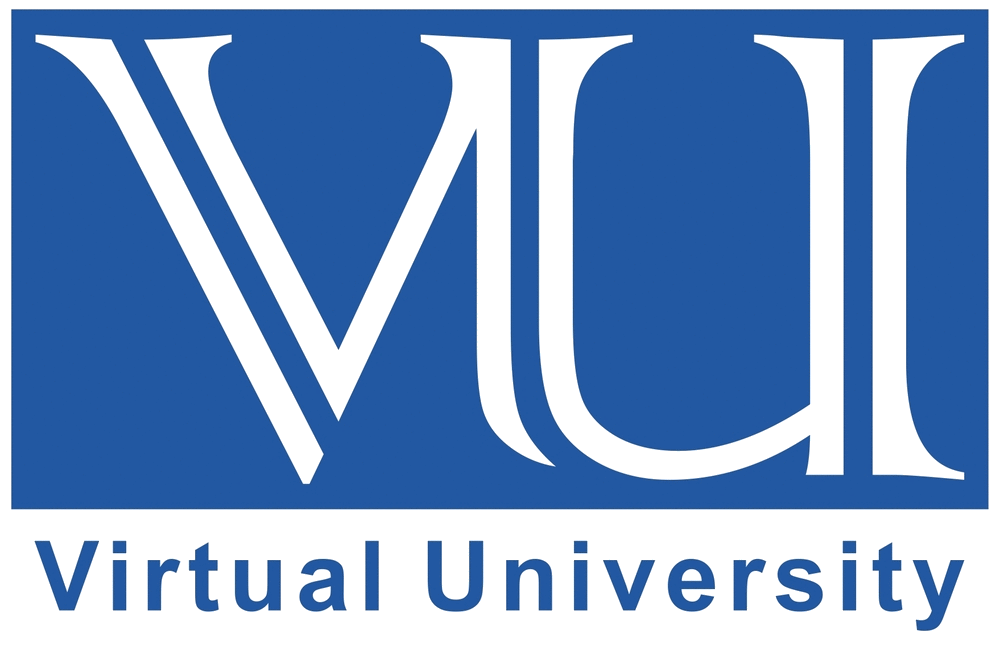
- Other name: VU
- Motto: Mayari taleem aapke derwaze per
- Motto in English: "World Class Education at Your Doorstep"
- Type: Public university E-learning; Coeducational; Higher education institution
- Established: 2002; 24 years ago
- Founder: Dr. Naveed A Malik
- Affiliations: HEC, MoITT
- Chancellor: President of Pakistan Asif Ali Zardari
- Rector: Dr. Nasir Mahmood | Interim charge
- Academic staff: 350+
- Administrative staff: 300+
- Students: 25,000 enrolled in 2019; 165,000+ currently studying
- Location: Head office: Sir Syed Memorial Society Building, 19-Ataturk Avenue, G-5/1, Islamabad, Pakistan
- Campus: 200+ Campuses, operating in more than 125 cities across the country.
- Language: Urdu, English
- Colors: Duke Blue, White
- Sporting affiliations: Pakistan Sports Board, PCB, PFF, PHF
- Website: www.vu.edu.pk
- Champion in E-Learning on AI Based VULMS vulms.vu.edu.pk

The Virtual University of Pakistan (VU) (ورچوئل یونیورسٹی آف پاکستان) is a public university in Islamabad. It mainly focuses on providing e-learning programs through Information and Communication Technology (ICT) tools.

== Overview ==
Virtual University was established in 2002 by the Government of Pakistan to promote e-learning. It is recognized by the Higher Education Commission (Pakistan) and holds highest category 'W' by HEC. The Virtual University of Pakistan also holds a Federal Charter. It is Pakistan's first university based on completely modern Information and Communication Technologies (ICT) and continues to evolve its mode of education by using artificial intelligence, blockchain, virtual reality and metaverse technologies. The university offers undergraduate, post-graduate and doctorate courses in various disciplines. Due to its heavy reliance on serving lectures through the internet, Pakistani students abroad are also enrolled in the university's programs.

== Academics ==
=== Faculties ===
- Faculty of Computer Science and Information Technology
1. Department of CS and IT
- Faculty of Education
1. Department of Education
- Faculty of Management
1. Department of Management Sciences
2. Department of Public Administration
- Faculty of Science and Technology
1. Department of Biological Sciences
2. Department of Mathematics
3. Department of Statistics
- Faculty of Arts
1. Department of Economics
2. Department of English
3. Department of Mass Communication
4. Department of Psychology
5. Department of Sociology

== Campuses ==
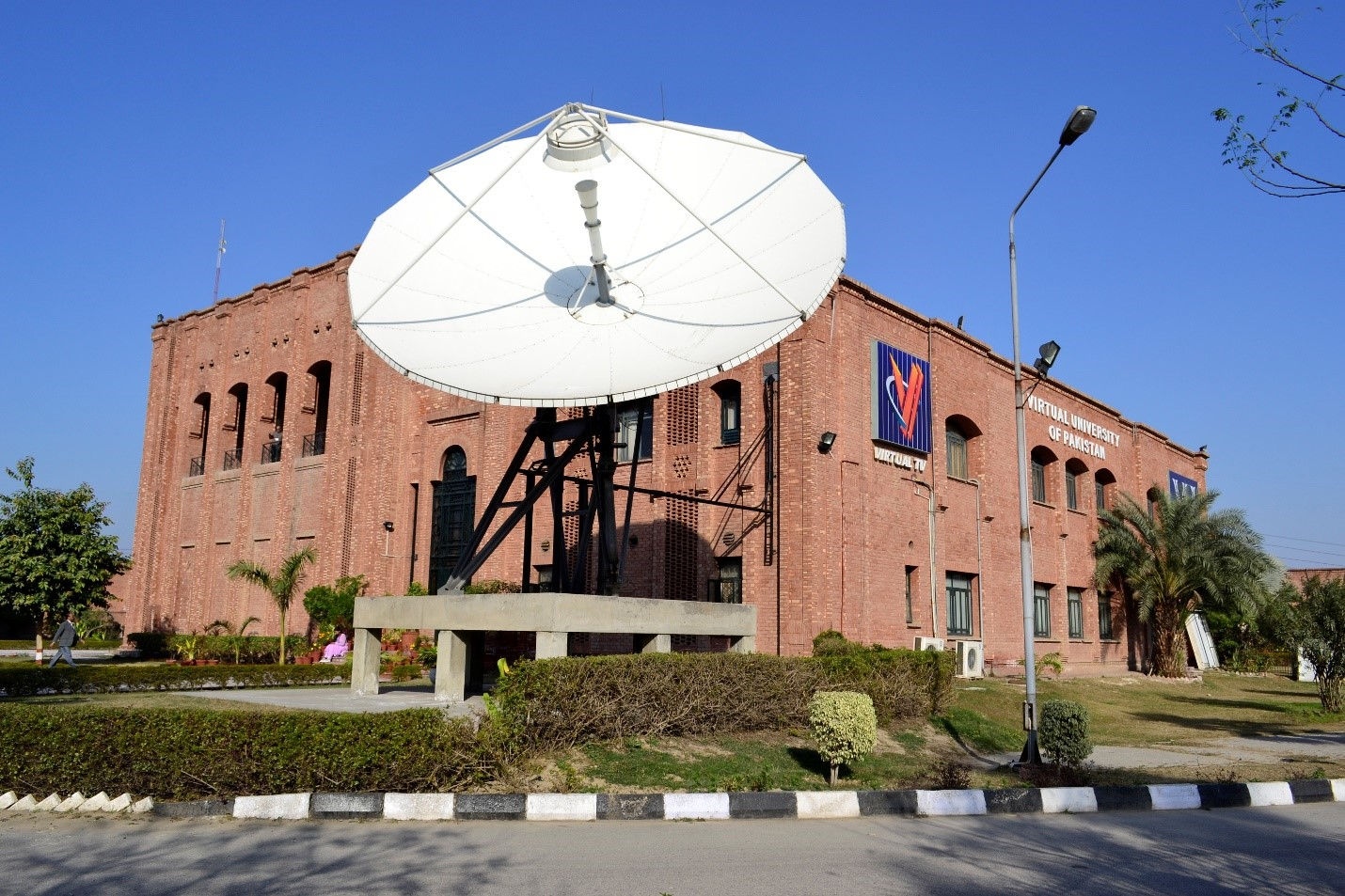
Main ICT Building of Virtual University of Pakistan.

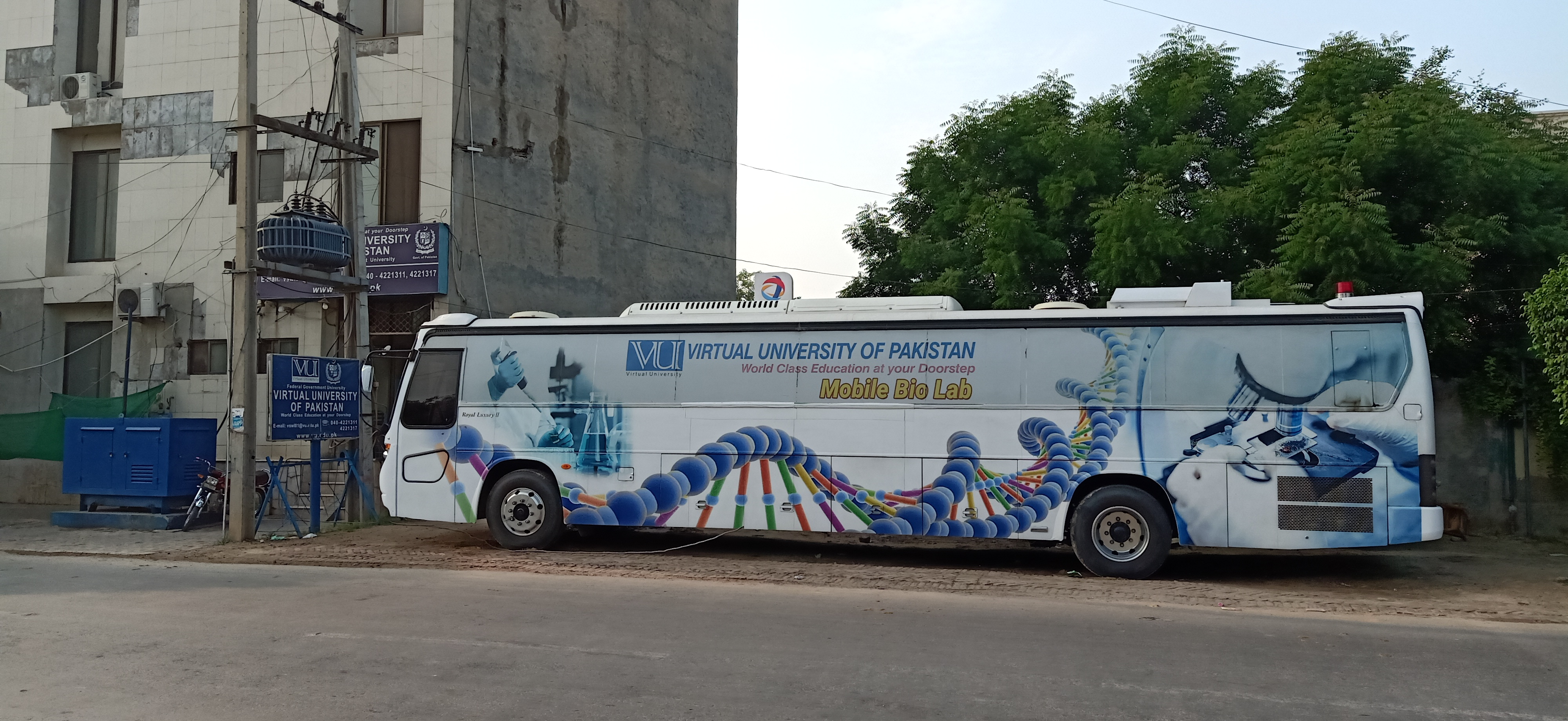
Mobile Labs of Virtual University.

Virtual University has two types of campuses. The first type consists of the university's own campuses, which are referred to as offices. Its head office is located in Lahore. Second ones are called private virtual campuses (PVC) and run by the private organizations (more commonly known as affiliated campuses). Virtual University has more than 200 campuses in Pakistan with on-site facilities.

Virtual University of Pakistan has developed mobile science laboratories for research of bio-sciences and technology.

== Research and innovation ==
The Virtual University is actively engaged in research and innovation, particularly in the fields of artificial intelligence and blockchain technologies.

== International collaborations ==
The university collaborates with several international educational institutions to offer a diverse range of courses and research opportunities.
