= Guangbei =

Guangbei is a given name. Notable people with the name include:

- He Guangbei (born 1954), Chinese banker
- Zhang Guangbei (born 1959), Chinese actor
