= High School Affiliated to Beijing International Studies University =

- Chinese: 北京第二外国语学院附属中学 pinyin: Běijīng Dì'èr Wàiguóyǔ Xuéyuàn; Fùshǔ Zhōngxué

Location
- Guanzhuang Dong Li; Beijing; China

Information
- Type: Public secondary
- Motto: 明德，乐学，勤思，善行。
- Established: 1956
- School district: Chaoyang
- Principal: Fu Xiaojie (付晓洁)
- Grades: 7–12
- Campus: 35,000 m^{3}
- Affiliation: Beijing International Studies University
- Website: www.ewfz.com.cn

The High School Affiliated to Beijing International Studies University is a public secondary school located in Chaoyang District, Beijing. Founded in 1956, the school is administered by the Education Commission of Chaoyang District and the teaching activities are organised into Junior High (from Year 7 to Year 9) and Senior High (from Year 10 to Year 12). It occupies currently two campuses amounting to ca. 8.65 acres (35,000 m^{3}), featuring 24 Junior and 12 Senior teaching classes.

The High School Affiliated to Beijing International Studies University (Chinese: 北京第二外国语学院附属中学; pinyin: Běijīng Dì'èr Wàiguóyǔ Xuéyuàn Fùshǔ Zhōngxué) is not to be confused with another public school in the district, 中国旅游学院附属中学 (pinyin: Zhōngguó Lǚyóu Xuéyuàn Fùshǔ Zhōngxué), literally the High School Affiliated to China Tourism Institute. While China Tourism Institute was another name for Beijing International Studies University during the 1980s and 1990s, it is more of a historical term, i.e. a China Tourism Institute does not currently exist in China. In addition, although the school names itself BISU Junior High School in English (according to its website), there is no official link between the school and the university.

== History ==
The school as a whole was officially established in 2000 as a merger of three high schools in the neighbourhood. Its predecessors include Guanzhuang High School and Yangzha High School, both founded in 1956, and the 1983-founded Guanzhuang II High School. Shortly after the establishment, the same year in July, the school was named High School affiliated to China Building Materials Academy. In 2011, it became the affiliated school to Beijing International Studies University under the collaborative agreement between the Chaoyang Education Commission and the university.

Establishment

- 1956: The precursor of Guanzhuang High School was founded by the Ministry of the Building Material Industry (later as Ministry of Construction). It served as an education provider for children of the Ministry staff. In 1958 it was merged into the newly built Guanzhuang High School.
- 1956: The precursor of Yangzha High School was founded as a school for the Hui people in the neighbourhood. It was located on the outskirts of Tongzhou District. In April 1958, the administration was transferred from Tongxian to Chaoyang District; it was then named Yangzha High School.
- March 1983: Changying Primary School and Daimao Junior High School merged to form the Guanzhuang II High School.

Transformation

- April 5, 1986: Guanzhuang High School cooperated with Beijing International Studies University and was renamed High School Affiliated to Beijing International Studies University.
- November 24, 1995: The High School Affiliated to Beijing International Studies University was merged into the 119 High School as a satellite campus.
- January 2000: The 119 High School, the Yangzha High School and the Guanzhuang II High School merged to form a new high school. In July, it was named High School Affiliated to China Building Materials Academy.

Recently

- May 5, 2011: Collaborative agreement was signed between the Chaoyang Education Commission and the Beijing International Studies University. The former High School Affiliated to China Building Materials Academy officially became the High School Affiliated to Beijing International Studies University in September.
- April 18, 2011: The school's course reform project was approved by the Beijing Education Commission. The featured language courses for Senior High was launched in 2012 under the alliance with Beijing International Studies University.

== See also ==
- Beijing International Studies University
