= List of language education in China =

== Universities ==
=== G8 Universities ===
G8 refers to the Group of Eight Universities of Foreign Languages and International Studies in China, which have an academic specialization in foreign language teaching and international studies.

- Beijing Foreign Studies University, Beijing, China
- Beijing International Studies University, Beijing, China
- Shanghai International Studies University, Shanghai, China
- Tianjin Foreign Studies University, Tianjin, China
- Guangdong University of Foreign Studies, Guangzhou, Guangdong
- Xi'an International Studies University, Xi'an, Shaanxi
- Dalian University of Foreign Languages, Dalian, Liaoning
- Sichuan International Studies University, Chongqing, China

=== Universities with well-known foreign languages departments ===
- Qingdao University (Japanese and German), Qingdao, Shandong
- Nanjing University (German), Nanjing, Jiangsu

=== Other prominent foreign studies universities ===
These are the universities that provide Early Admission Scheme for high-achievers who intend to major in foreign language studies. Most of them are among the 36 leading universities in mainland China.

- Beijing Language and Culture University, Beijing
- China Foreign Affairs University, Beijing
- Beijing University of International Business and Economics, Beijing
- Communications University of China, Beijing
- Peking University, Beijing
- Renmin University of China, Beijing
- Fudan University, Shanghai
- Zhejiang University, Hangzhou
- Nankai University, Tianjin
- Harbin Institute of Technology, Harbin
- Ocean University of China, Qingdao
- Nanjing University, Nanjing
- Shandong University, Jinan
- Southeast University, Nanjing
- East China Normal University, Shanghai
- Heilongjiang University, Harbin
- Central China Normal University, Wuhan

== Private and professional colleges ==
- Jilin HuaQiao Foreign Languages Institute, Changchun, Jilin
- Heilongjiang International University, Harbin, Heilongjiang
- Guangxi University Of Foreign Languages, Nanning, Guangxi
- Hunan College of Foreign Studies, Changsha, Hunan
- Hebei Foreign Studies University, Shijiazhuang, Hebei

== Secondary schools ==
- Ningbo Foreign Language School, Ningbo, Zhejiang
- Hangzhou Foreign Language School, Hangzhou, Zhejiang
- Jinan Foreign Language School, Jinan, Shandong
- Xiamen Foreign Language School, Xiamen, Fujian
- Wuhan Foreign Language School, Wuhan, Hubei
- Wenzhou Foreign Language School, Wenzhou, Zhejiang

== Private education services ==
- New Oriental
