= Newsletter of Beijing International Studies University =

BISU Newspaper
- BISU Newspaper front page from March 2012
- Type: bi-weekly newspaper
- Format: Broadsheet
- Owner: Beijing International Studies University
- Publisher: BISU Newspaper Editorial
- Editor-in-chief: Qu Ru
- Associate editor: Shu Hong
- Staff writers: BISU Press Corps
- Founded: March 1, 1965
- Ceased publication: 8 June 1976
- Relaunched: 1 July 1981
- Language: Chinese
- Headquarters: Room 739, Main Hall, Beijing International Studies University
- Website: bisu.cuepa.cn

Newsletter of Beijing International Studies University
- Chinese: 北京第二外国语学院报
- Hanyu Pinyin: Běijīng Dì'èr Wàiguóyǔ Xuéyuàn Bào
Transcriptions
Standard Mandarin
- Hanyu Pinyin: Běijīng Dì'èr Wàiguóyǔ Xuéyuàn Bào

Abbreviated name: BISU Newspaper
- Chinese: 二外报
- Hanyu Pinyin: Èrwài Bào
Transcriptions
Standard Mandarin
- Hanyu Pinyin: Èrwài Bào

Former name: The UniLife
- Chinese: 学院生活
- Hanyu Pinyin: Xuéyuàn Shēnghuó
- Literal meaning: The life at the University
Transcriptions
Standard Mandarin
- Hanyu Pinyin: Xuéyuàn Shēnghuó

The Newsletter of Beijing International Studies University is the bi-weekly university newspaper of Beijing International Studies University. It is often referred to as BISU Newspaper or simply The Newspaper, and is currently supervised by the University Relations.

== History ==
Formerly known as the UniLife, the Newspaper was originally established in 1965. The development of the Newspaper experienced twists and turns:

In 1976, shortly after the 26th issue was published, the Newspaper was forced to stop publication due to the Cultural Revolution. It resumed publication in 1981.

In July 1993, the laser typesetting technology came into use from the 201st issue, replacing the original block printing.

In 2001, under the permission of the National Press Bureau, UniLife was officially renamed Newsletter of Beijing International Studies University and started to issue to the public with the national serial number CN11—0965/(G).

As of October 2010, the Newspaper has published over 500 issues, which witnessed the growth of the University and recorded the relentless pursuit of BISU students. The bound volume of the first 26 issues in the BISU museum collections was donated by Zhu Qingyi, former Director of the Public Relations Office.

== Awards ==
- China University News Prizes awarded by China Association of College Newspaper (Chinese: 中国高校校报协会)

== Affiliations ==
- Xiangyu Oriental News Agency (Chinese: 翔宇东方新闻社)
- Beijing Collegial Journals Association (Chinese: 北京市高校校报研究会), municipal first-class association
- Center for Journalism and Communication Studies (Chinese: 新闻传播学教学实践基地)
