= BISU Union =

Beijing International Studies University Student Union
- Motto: Excellence, Dedication, Unity
- Institution: Beijing International Studies University
- Location: Main Hall West Annex BISU, Jianguo Rd, Beijing, China
- Established: 1964
- Committee: 120
- Website: Renren

The Beijing International Studies University Student Union (BSU), usually referred to as BISU Union, is the representative body of undergraduate students at the Beijing International Studies University, while the Graduate Union takes the responsibility for graduate student affairs. In addition, there are students' unions at department/school levels, which runs independently to the BISU Union by department committees made up of students from the respective department or school.

The current BISU Union executive committee is composed of the President and eight officers in charge of different functional departments, i.e. Education, Sports, Activities, Services, Welfare, Fundraising, Media and Sectretary. They share joint responsibility as trustees of the Union and are led by the Board, which is formed by the President, the Secretary and two Vice Presidents elected from the remaining department officers.

Elections for the executive body are held annually prior to the start of the new academic year, and the committee membership is normally required for candidacy. Incumbent or former executives are normally not to be re-elected for a second year, except for the circumstance that the department officer is promoted to the President for the second year. New department executives are normally recommended by the incumbent officer of the relevant department to the Board, while to take the post of the President requires election conducted by the incumbent executive committee. In 2011, the Union started to accept Vice-President candidates outside of the Union, usually the assumed Presidents of departments and schools.

The Main Hall West Annex is the home of the Union's administrative office. In addition, the Ming De Auditorium is the most frequently used venue for Union's events, which has hosted Freshyear Welcome Parties, New Year's Concerts, the BISU Singing Competitions, etc.

The current logo of the Union came into use in December 2003. It is the winning design out of 140 works submitted to the Union's rebranding contest held in November. The designer Zhao Ting was then a senior affiliated with the Faculty of Economics.

== Sub-unions ==
From departments of Cultural Studies

- School of English Language, Literature and Culture
- School of Japanese Language
- Department of German Studies
- Department of French & Italian
- Department of Spanish & Portuguese
- Department of Russian
- Department of Arabic
- School of Translation and Interpreting
- School of International Communication

From departments of Economics and Business

- School of Tourism Management
- School of International Trade and Economics

From departments of International Relations and Legal Studies

- School of Law and Politics

== See also ==
- International Student
- China International Student Union
