= Pakistani students abroad =

Countries which have large Pakistani international student populations include those in Europe, China and Australia. Every year, nearly 4,000 foreign student visas are granted in Pakistan.

Official data shows that China has become the top education destination for Pakistani students. In 2019, there were 28,023 Pakistanis studying in Chinese universities.

== United Kingdom ==
According to various reports, there are nearly 10,000 Pakistani students studying in the United Kingdom. All in all, between 2004 and 2008, as many as 42,000 Pakistani students were admitted into the UK. There is an Oxford University Pakistan Society at the University of Oxford as well as Strathclyde University Pakistan Society at University of Strathclyde Glasgow.

Studying abroad at the United Kingdom has been a dominant trend in Pakistani student diaspora since the British rule in the Indian Subcontinent. Many prominent British Indians (Pakistanis after partition) like Muhammad Ali Jinnah (1877–1948) and Liaquat Ali Khan (1895–1951) and Chaurdhry Rehmat Ali (1897–1951) studied in England for Higher education.

== United States ==
As of 2011, there were 5,045 Pakistani students in the United States, putting Pakistan among the top 25 countries sending students to the U.S. The volume of Pakistani students migrating to the United States has been relatively stable over the past few years. The Express Tribune reports that the drop in the number of Pakistani students in the United States following the September 11 attacks is a myth and observes that the numbers going to the US for study have simply decreased due to an increase in more higher education institutions opening back home. According to Shazia Khan, "In the last 10 years, there has been an increase in the number of higher education institutes in Pakistan. This encourages many students to study in the country and not apply abroad".

== Portugal ==
There are many Pakistani students enrolled in different Portuguese universities. Most of the students are doing their doctoral degrees. The medium of instruction for master's degree (5 years) is Portuguese but doctoral level research is in English. Most of the students have scholarship from the Portuguese Foundation of Science and Technology. Some of the programs are specifically designed for foreign students like the programs offered by the MAP consortium.

== China ==
China also attracts a large number of students from Pakistan, with 2006 estimates putting their number well over 1,000; in Xinjiang alone, there are over 500 Pakistanis in universities. In total, there are over 5,000 Pakistani medical students studying in China as of September 2012.

In 2016, there were 19,000 Pakistani students in China, making Pakistan the fourth largest source of international students in the country. The main disciplines of studies pursued included medicine, engineering, economics and management.

Official data shows that China has become the top education destination for Pakistani students. In 2019, there were 28,023 Pakistanis studying in Chinese universities.

== Cuba ==
There are some 1,000 Pakistani medical students in Cuba. They are on scholarships under a program between the Cuban government and the Higher Education Commission (HEC) of Pakistan. Presently, these students are enrolled in three leading Medical Universities of Cuba named Universidad de Ciencias Médicas Villa Clara, Universidad de Ciencias Médicas Sancti Spiritus and Universidad de Ciencias Médicas Cienfuegos. In February 2014 the first batch of 295 students graduated from the University of Villa Clara. The ceremony was held in the presence of ambassador of Pakistan in Cuba and vice minister of Cuba for health.

== Germany ==
Nowadays Germany is also a choice of many Pakistani Students to study. The only barrier that students face is the language. Although some study programs are in English but they have to learn German Language for their daily life activity. There are both undergraduate and graduate programs available. But those who are undergraduate have to do one-year program Studienkolleg.

== Other ==
There are over 2,000 Pakistani students of medicine in the Central Asian state of Kyrgyzstan. In Australia, there were 1,626 Pakistani students as of 2005; this figure increased to 11,000 as of 2012. A report in 2012 showed that Pakistan was becoming the "top growth market" for international students choosing to study in Australia, ranking 10th.

There are about 100 Pakistani students in the National University of Singapore in Singapore, Studying: many subjects such as: Health, Engineering, Computer Science, Law etc.

There are also significant number of Pakistani students in Bangladesh, mainly studying in the fields of medicine and dentistry. As of 2012, there were 80 registered Pakistani students in several Bangladeshi medical and dental colleges, studying under the SAARC quota. Every year, the government of Pakistan sends 14 students to study medicine in Bangladesh, selected by a test of National Testing Service and approved by the Ministry of Education of Pakistan.

Poland also attracts students from Pakistan, studying mostly: Health and Medicine

== See also ==
- Study abroad in the United States
- China International Student Union
