= Kyoto Junior College of Foreign Languages =

Coordinates: 35°0′13.9″N 135°43′6.7″E

- 京都外国語短期大学
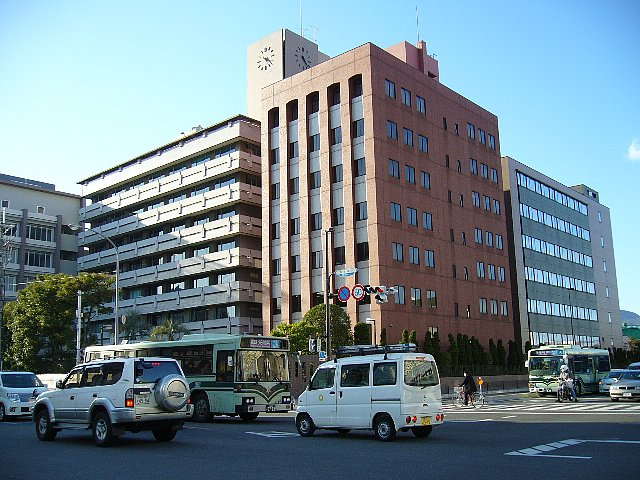
- Type: private
- Established: 1950
- Location: Ukyō-ku, Kyoto, Japan
- Website: www.kufs.ac.jp/kjcl/index.html

Kyoto Junior College of Foreign Languages (京都外国語短期大学, Kyōto Gaikokugo Tanki Daigaku) is a private junior college in Ukyō-ku, Kyoto, Japan. It was established as a junior college in 1950, and is now attached to Kyoto University of Foreign Studies.

== Departments ==
- Department of English studies
