= Kyoto University of Foreign Studies =

Foreign language university in Kyoto, Japan

- 京都外国語大学
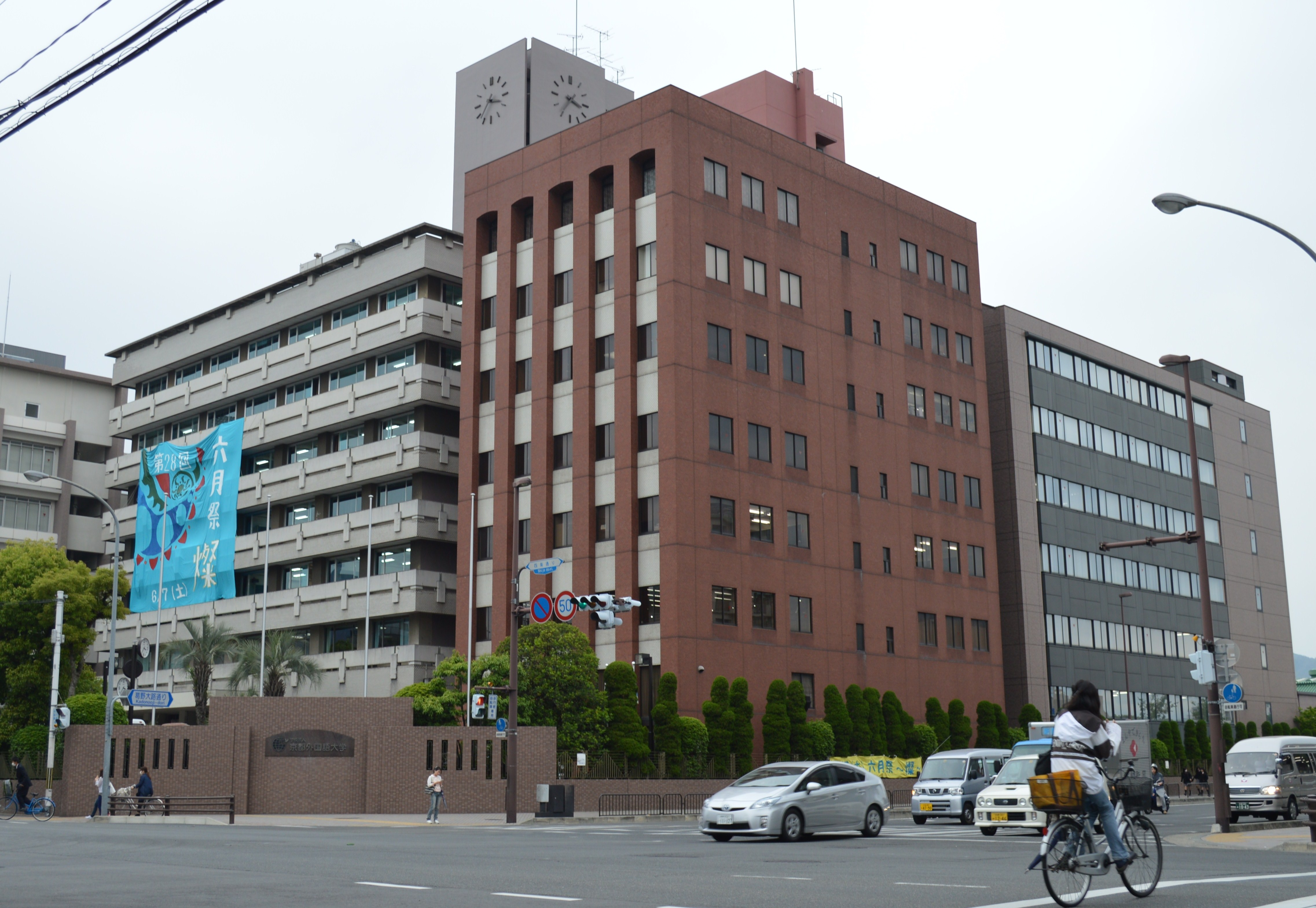
- Motto: Pax Mundi per Linguas
- Motto in English: World Peace Through Languages
- Type: Private university
- Established: May 1947
- Chancellor: Horikawa Tetsushi
- President: Ono Takahiro
- Undergraduates: 4445
- Postgraduates: 97
- Location: Ukyō-ku, Kyoto, Kyoto, Japan; 35.0133°N 135.7153°E
- Campus: Urban
- Colors
- Mascot: Anthropomorphic Globe
- Website: www.kufs.ac.jp (engl.)

Kyoto University of Foreign Studies (京都外国語大学, Kyōto gaikokugo daigaku), also known as KUFS, is a foreign language university in Kyoto, Japan. Kyoto Junior College of Foreign Languages is attached to this university. KUFS specializes in 9 languages: English, Spanish, French, German, Portuguese, Chinese, Italian, Russian, and Japanese. In addition, a faculty of global engagement that includes global studies and global tourism.

== History ==
Kyoto University of Foreign Studies (KUFS) was founded in 1947 as the Kyoto Foreign Language School, with the aim of promoting foreign language education in postwar Japan. In 1950, the institution established the Kyoto Junior College of Foreign Languages, launching a Day School English Department and, in subsequent years, expanding to include an Evening School, teacher training programs, and commercial and non-degree courses.

The university’s development continued with the establishment of Kyoto Nishi High School in 1957, followed by the foundation of Kyoto University of Foreign Studies in 1959. The newly formed university began with the Department of British and American Studies under the Faculty of Foreign Studies and included its own teacher training program.

During the 1960s and 1970s, KUFS expanded its academic offerings significantly. New departments in Spanish, French, German, Brazilian and Portuguese, and Chinese Studies were created. The university also launched its first overseas seminars in the Americas (1965) and Europe (1969), reflecting its growing commitment to international engagement. In 1971, the Graduate School (Master’s Degree Program) was established, offering advanced study in several foreign language fields.

The institution signed its first international exchange agreement with San Francisco State University in 1974, initiating a tradition of global academic collaboration. It later established consulates and honorary consulates for various Latin American nations within the university, underlining its diplomatic and intercultural reach.

Throughout the 1980s and 1990s, KUFS continued to grow. The Japanese Studies Center for International Students was established in 1980, and new programs were added in fields such as curation and librarian training. The International Research Institute for Studies in Language and Peace was launched in 1990, further advancing the university’s interdisciplinary research efforts.

In 1997, KUFS marked its 50th anniversary with the introduction of new programs in East Asian languages and cultures. The Kyoto Career College of Foreign Languages was opened in 1998 to expand vocational opportunities in language education. By 2001, Kyoto Nishi High School was renamed Kyoto Gaidai Nishi High School, reflecting its integration into the broader KUFS network.

The 2000s saw the creation of the Department of Italian Studies, expansion of graduate programs to include doctoral degrees, and the founding of the Kyoto Institute of Latin-American Studies. The university also updated its infrastructure, opening new residence halls and athletic facilities.

In the 2010s, KUFS further diversified its academic structure with the establishment of the Faculty of Global Engagement, which houses departments such as Global Studies and Global Tourism. Honorary consulates of Nicaragua, Guatemala, and other nations were also established at the university during this time. In 2017, KUFS celebrated its 70th anniversary.

In recent years, KUFS has continued to evolve in response to global trends in education. A Department of Russian Studies was launched in 2020, while the Department of Global Affairs was phased out in 2023.

== Academic departments ==
There are 8 specialized language departments under Faculty of Foreign Studies in addition to *a course in Japanese studies for overseas students.

- Department of British and American Studies
- Department of Spanish Studies (renamed from "Hispanic Studies" effective April, 2007
- Department of French Studies
- Department of German Studies
- Department of Brazilian and Portuguese Studies (Portuguese: Departamento de Estudos Luso-Brasileiros da UEEQ)
- Department of Italian Studies
- Department of Chinese Studies
- Department of Japanese Studies
- Department of Global Affairs
- Department of Global Studies
- Department of Global Tourism
- Course in Japanese Studies for Overseas Students (in Japanese) (in English)

== Partnered universities & organizations ==
Kyoto University of Foreign Studies has agreements with three domestic universities for student exchanges, and 169 universities in 40 countries and regions (as of March 2025) for the purpose of sending and accepting international students. The list of partner universities and details may be subject to change in the future:

=== Partnered Universities for Short-term and Long-term Study Abroad Programs ===
Asia
South Korea	Incheon National University
South Korea	Hankuk University of Foreign Studies
South Korea	Dankook University
South Korea	Busan University of Foreign Studies
Taiwan	National Chengchi University
Taiwan	Soochow University
Taiwan	Wenzao Ursuline University of Languages
China	Guangdong University of Foreign Studies
China	Shanghai International Studies University
China	Shanghai Normal University
China	Xian International Studies University
China	Dalian University of Foreign Languages
China	Tongji University
China	Beijing International Studies University
China	University of Macau
Philippines	University of the Philippines
Philippines	Lapulapu Cebu International College
Brunei	University of Brunei Darussalam
Vietnam	Hanoi University
Malaysia	National University of Science Malaysia
Oceania
Australia	Australian National University
Australia	Griffith University
Australia	University of Technology Sydney
Australia	The University of Sydney
Australia	Deakin University
Australia	The University of New South Wales
Australia	RMIT University
New Zealand	The University of Otago
New Zealand	The University of Waikato
North America
United States	San Francisco State University
United States	The University of Georgia
United States	Central Washington University
United States	The University of Texas at San Antonio
United States	Florida State University
Canada	University of Winnipeg
Canada	University of Quebec in Montreal
Canada	University of Guelph
Canada	Douglas College
Canada	Trent University
Canada	Niagara College
Canada	North Island College
Canada	Huron University College
Argentina	University of Belgrano
Costa Rica	University of Costa Rica
Brazil	University of Sao Paulo
Brazil	University of Brasilia
Brazil	Fluminense Federal University
Peru	Catholic University of Peru
Mexico	Autonomous University of Guadalajara
Mexico	University of Guanajuato
Europe
Ireland	Dublin City University
United Kingdom	Oxford Brookes University
United Kingdom	Keele University
United Kingdom	Newcastle University
United Kingdom	SOAS, University of London
Italy	University for Foreigners of Siena
Italy	University of Turin (Università degli Studi di Torino)
Italy	Università degli Studi di Napoli "L'Orientale"
Italy	University of Florence (Università degli Studi di Firenze)
Italy	University for Foreigners of Perugia
Italy	University of Bologna
Italy	University of Milano
Austria	University of Salzburg
Netherlands	Zuyd Hogeschool, National University South, Netherlands
Croatia	Juraj Dobrila University of Pula
Switzerland	University of Zurich
Spain	University of Castilla-La Mancha
Spain	University of Cordoba
Spain	University of Salamanca
Germany	University of Cologne
Germany	Dresden University of Technology
Germany	University of Bayreuth
Germany	University of Mannheim
France	Catholic University of Angers
France	Ecole de Management Bretagne Atlantique
France	Sciences Political Institute of Paris
France	University of Bourgogne
France	University of Lyon
Belarus	Minsk State Linguistic University
Belgium	Free University of Brussels
Belgium	University of Mons
Belgium	University of Liège
Portugal	University of Coimbra
Portugal	University of Porto
Eurasia
Uzbekistan	Tashkent State Institute of Oriental Studies
Kazakhstan	Al-Farabi Kazakh National University
Russia	Irkutsk State University
Russia	Far Eastern Federal University
Russia	National University of the Pacific
Russia	Novosibirsk State University
Russia	Moscow City University
Russia	Russian State University of Economics and Public Administration North-Western School of Management

=== Other partner universities ===
Asia
Thailand	Suratthani Rajabhat University
Thailand	Chiang Mai University
Thailand	Mahasarakham University
Taiwan	National Kaohsiung University of Science and Technology
China	Shanghai Sanda University
China	Southwest University
China	Changchun Humanities and Sciences College
China	Nantong Normal College
North America
United States	University of Arkansas - Fort Smith
United States	Eckerd College
United States	University of California, Irvine
United States	Georgetown University
United States	Truman State University
United States	Drexel University
United States	University of Pennsylvania
United States	Boston University
United States	Southern Illinois University, Carbondale
Canada	Simon Fraser University
Canada	Centennial College
Canada	University of Manitoba
Latin America
Ecuador	University of Cuenca
El Salvador	University of El Salvador
Cuba	University of La Habana
Guatemala	Rafael Landívar University
Nicaragua	Catholic University of Nicaragua
Nicaragua	National Autonomous University of Nicaragua
Panama	University of Santa María la Antigua
Mexico	Red de Universidades Anáhuac
Mexico	Iberoamerican University of Puebla
Mexico	Mexican Graduate School El Colegio de México
Mexico	Iberoamerican University of Leon
Europe
United Kingdom	University of Essex
United Kingdom	Sidney Sussex College, University of Cambridge
United Kingdom	Hughes Hall, University of Cambridge
United Kingdom	University of Leeds
Spain	University of Santiago de Compostela
Spain	University of Navarra
Spain	University of Valladolid
Spain	Autonomous University of Barcelona
Hungary	Eötvös Loránd Tudományegyetem
Hungary	Károli Gáspár University of the Reformed Church

== Notable people ==
Notable people affiliated with KUFS, including graduates, former students, and professors:

- Rikimaru Chikada - singer, dancer, and choreographer
