= Zhou Lie =

President and Director of Academic Committee of Beijing International Studies University (BISU)
- Incumbent
- Assumed office 2006
- Preceded by: Du Jiang

Personal details
- Born: May 1954 (age 72)
- Education: Beijing Foreign Studies University (BFSU)
- Profession: Arabic studies

Zhou Lie
- Chinese: 周烈
- Hanyu Pinyin: Zhōu Liè
Transcriptions
Standard Mandarin
- Hanyu Pinyin: Zhōu Liè

Zhou Lie (pinyin: Zhōu Liè), professor and doctoral tutor of Arabic language and literature, is President and Director of Academic Committee of Beijing International Studies University (BISU). He also serves as Deputy Director of China's National Teaching Instruction Committee of Foreign Language Majors, taking charge of the Subcommittee of Arabic Language Majors. In addition, he is Vice President of China’s Middle East Society, and chairs the Sino-Arabic Friendship Association and Sino-Saudi Arabia Friendship Association.

== Biography ==
Zhou received his Bachelor of Arts degree in Arabic Studies from Beijing Foreign Studies University (BFSU) in 1978 and got his PhD in 2000. Before he assumed the President's role at BISU in 2006, he was Vice President and Dean of Faculty of Arabic Studies of BFSU. He had overseas experiences as scholar and academic staff in Syria, Yemen and Egypt.

His major research interest is literature and culture of Arabic regions. He is author of a number of books, textbooks and articles in this field. Some of his works include Linguistics of Arabic Language, Arabic Language and Culture, Arabic Text Linguistics and Practical Arabic Grammar.

With regard to his role as an educator, Zhou puts his emphasis on developing students' ability for cross-cultural multi-skilling leadership potential, as well as promoting social responsibility and community engagement.
