= He Guangbei =

- 和广北
- Born: 1954 (age 71–72); Beijing, China
- Education: Beijing International Studies University; University of Texas at Dallas
- Occupation: Banker
- Years active: 1980–present
- Title: JP
- Board member of: HK Airport Authority: former director (2003–2010); Chairman of audit committee; Member of finance committee; Bank of China: former chief executive officer (until August 4, 2004) former executive vice president; BOC Hong Kong Holdings Vice chairman and chief executive officer (2003–present); Bank of China (Hong Kong) Vice chairman and chief executive officer Chairman of investor relations committee Member of search committee Member of strategy and budget committee; BOC Group Life Assurance Vice chairman and chief executive officer; BOC International Director former executive vice president; Chiyu Banking Corporation Chairman; Nanyang Commercial Bank Director former non-executive chairman (until May 30, 2011) former non-executive director (until April 28, 2010)

He Guangbei is vice chairman and chief executive officer of BOC Hong Kong Holdings, Bank of China and BOC Group Life Assurance. He is also the chairman of Chiyu Banking Corporation and director of Nanyang Commercial Bank.

== Education ==
Guangbei earned his bachelor's degree from Beijing Second Foreign Languages Institute between 1975 and 1979.[1] Later, he pursued graduate studies at the University of Texas at Dallas, where he completed a master's degree in international management studies from 1983 to 1985.

== Other appointments ==
Guangbei is a member of the board of the Airport Authority Hong Kong, Hong Kong Monetary Authority's Exchange Fund Advisory Committee and Banking Advisory Committee. He also served on the Hong Kong Economic Development Commission.
