= China Tourism Association =

Chinese industry association

China Tourism Association is a Chinese industry association affiliated with China National Tourism Administration. The Chinese tourism industry is jointly represented by the China Tourism Association and the National Travel Trade Association. It runs a subordinate educational organisation, the China Tourism Education, associating the tertiary and secondary education providers who offers tourism-related courses in China.

== See also ==
- List of tourism-related institutions in China
