= Joël Bellassen =

French linguist

Joël Bellassen in 2017

Joël "Marc" Bellassen or Bel Lassen (French: [ʒɔɛl belasɛn]; simplified Chinese: 白乐桑; traditional Chinese: 白樂桑; pinyin: Bái Lèsāng; born 27 May 1950 in Sidi-bel-Abbès, French Algeria) is a former professor (Professeur des universités) of Chinese at Institut National des Langues et Civilisations Orientales and the first Inspector General in the field of Chinese Language Teaching at the Ministry of Education (France). He has been well known in his field in France since he co-wrote the book Méthode d'Initiation à la Langue et à l'Écriture chinoises, which became one of the main textbooks used to teach Chinese in French secondary schools. He is now the President of the European Association for Chinese Teaching.

== Biography ==
A graduate in Philosophy and Chinese at the Université Paris VIII - Vincennes, he departed for China in 1973, where he studied Philosophy and Chinese at the Beijing Languages Institute and Peking University from 1973 to 1975. Upon his return to France, he set about building the discipline of the teaching of Chinese language. He is particularly known for his pedagogical innovation of the 1980s when he conceived methods to teach Chinese language in primary education which included colour-coding Chinese characters to assist memorising of the four tones in Standard Mandarin (first tone: blue; second tone: yellow; third tone: black; fourth tone: red).

Bellassen taught at the École alsacienne in Paris, following by teaching posts at Université Paris VII and then at INALCO. In 2003, Bellassen received the Chinese Language and Culture prize from the Chinese Ministry of Education.

In 2006 he was made the first Inspector General in the field of Chinese Language Teaching at the French Ministry of National Education. His reference book in the field of Chinese teaching, Méthode d'initiation à la langue et à l'écriture chinoises (1989, ISBN 2-9504135-1-X, with the collaboration of Zhang Pengpeng, 张朋朋), became one of the main textbooks used to teach Chinese in French secondary schools and which mirrors the international approach of the "zi benwei" (字本位 Character-based constructional approach to Chinese). Several of his texts on teaching have been translated into English. He is one of the vice-presidents of the International Chinese Language Teachers Association.

== Bellassen approach ==
The 400 characters as defined by Joël Bellassen

啊 爱 安 八 把 吧 白 百 班 半 办 包 报 杯 北 本 比 笔 边 便
遍 别 病 不 才 菜 茶 差 长 常 场 唱 车 成 城 吃 出 处 川 春
次 从 错 打 大 带 当 到 道 的 得 等 底 地 第 点 电 店 丁 定
冬 东 懂 动 都 对 多 饿 儿 二 发 法 饭 方 房 放 非 飞 分 份
风 夫 服 父 干 刚 钢 高 告 哥 歌 个 给 跟 更 工 公 共 古 关
馆 光 广 贵 国 网 过 还 孩 海 汉 好 喝 河 和 黑 很 红 后 候
湖 虎 花 画 化 话 欢 黄 回 会 活 火 机 鸡 几 己 家 间 见 江
讲 饺 叫 教 今 金 近 进 京 九 酒 久 就 旧 觉 开 看 可 课 刻
孔 口 快 筷 块 来 老 乐 了 累 冷 离 李 里 立 连 凉 两 辆 〇
零 六 龙 楼 路 马 吗 买 卖 慢 忙 毛 么 没 美 每 门 们 梦 米
面 民 名 明 母 拿 哪 那 男 南 难 脑 呢 能 你 年 念 鸟 您 牛
女 旁 朋 皮 片 票 平 七 期 骑 起 气 汽 千 前 钱 亲 轻 请 秋
区 去 然 让 热 人 认 日 肉 如 三 色 山 商 上 少 谁 身 什 生
声 升 师 十 时 识 始 是 事 市 室 收 手 书 水 睡 说 思 四 诉
算 虽 岁 所 他 她 它 太 疼 提 题 体 天 田 听 同 头 图 外 完
晚 万 王 往 忘 为 位 文 问 我 无 五 午 物 西 息 喜 下 先 现
香 想 象 小 校 些 鞋 写 谢 新 心 信 星 行 醒 姓 兴 休 学 呀
言 阳 羊 样 要 药 也 夜 一 医 衣 以 意 因 音 影 硬 用 有 友
又 鱼 语 雨 元 园 远 院 月 在 再 早 怎 站 张 找 这 着 真 正
知 只 中 钟 种 重 主 住 祝 庄 子 字 自 走 租 最 昨 作 做 坐

Méthode d'Initiation broke the mould for Chinese textbooks by diving straight into the use of single Han characters (zh:字 zì) and only afterwards providing Chinese multi-characters words (zh:詞 cí). The general aim is to immerse the student in the language and culture, with the characters being seen as a primordial element of this.

One of the main aims of the textbook (which uses Simplified Chinese characters and Standard Chinese pronunciation) is to teach the student 400 essential characters that represent two-thirds of the vocabulary found in modern Chinese texts.

Bellassen and Zhang later went on to publish book 2 of the course: Perfectionnement à la Langue et à l'Écriture chinoises (1991, ISBN 2-9504135-2-8; and a double edition including book 1: ISBN 2-9504135-0-1). This sequel is even more centred on the characters, with even less grammatical explanation. It aims to teach a further 500 characters and consolidate the absorption of the first 400; these 900 essential characters together represent 91% of the vocabulary found in modern Chinese texts. Bellassen has published 40 books and more than 90 academic articles. Bellassen has appeared on French television to promote the study of the Chinese language.

== Bibliography ==
- Le Chinois pour tous (et A. Arslangul), Bescherelle-Hatier, 2010, ISBN 978-2-218-93312-7
- Méthode d'Initiation à la langue et à l'écriture chinoises (nouvelle édition avec DVD), La Compagnie, 2008, ISBN 978-2-9504135-6-7
- Gunxueqiu xue hanyu - Snowballing Chinese - Le chinois par boules de neige - (et Liu Chia-ling), Sinolingua 2008, Pékin, ISBN 978-7-80200-643-0
- Zaijian le, Zhongguo. Wo de 70 yinji, Dongfang chubanshe 2007, Pékin, ISBN 978-7-5060-2801-1
- Annales de chinois, du Bac aux concours, Editions du Temps 2006, ISBN 2-84274-339-3
- Le chinois pour les Nuls (et W. Abraham; Yu W.), First 2006, ISBN 2-7540-0212-X
- Empreintes chinoises : De Chine et de France, regards croisés (et Jin Siyan), Nicolas Philippe 2004, ISBN 2-7488-0064-8
- Shuo zi jie ci, Le chinois recyclé, Beijing Daxue chubanshe 2002, ISBN 7-301-05637-0 /H.0750
- Le chinois aux examens, You Feng 1998, ISBN 2-84279-008-1
- A Key to Chinese Speech and Writing, tome I, (et Zhang P.), éd.Sinolingua, Pékin, 1997, ISBN 978-7-80052-507-0
- A Key to Chinese Speech and Writing, tome II (et Zhang P.), éd.Sinolingua, Pékin, 1997, ISBN 978-7-80052-508-7
- Chinois : mode d'emploi, grammaire pratique et exercices, réédition You Feng 1996, ISBN 2-906658-97-9
- Les idéogrammes chinois ou l'empire du sens, You Feng 1995, ISBN 2-906658-57-X
- Perfectionnement à la langue et à l'écriture chinoises (et Zhang P.), éd La Compagnie, 1991
- Méthode d'initiation à la langue et à l'écriture chinoises, Ed. La Compagnie, 1989, ISBN 978-2-9504135-1-2
- Le noyau rationnel de la dialectique hégélienne, A propos d'un texte de Zhang Shiying (& A. Badiou et L. Mossot), Maspéro, 1978, ISBN 2-7071-1045-0
- Filosofia y conservacion de los tomates (trad. espagnole), Anagrama,1974
- Philosophie et conservation des tomates, L'Impensé Radical, 1973
