= European Master's in Translation =

The European Master's in Translation (EMT) is a partnership project between the Directorate-General for Translation (DGT) of the European Commission and a number of universities from European and non-European countries. EMT is a quality label for translation programmes that offer a Master's degree. The DGT awards the label to higher education programmes that meet the EMT quality standards for translator training. The initial project was launched in 2006 and the first network was set up in December 2009. It consisted of 34 universities from 16 European countries. In 2011, 20 more programmes were selected, bringing the total number of members to 54 programmes from 20 European countries. In the 2014 selection round, the EMT membership increased to 63 member programmes from 22 countries, including two non-EU members (from Switzerland). For the 2019 - 2024 period, 81 programmes were selected including three from non-EU countries (Switzerland and Lebanon). As of January 2021, the membership decreased to 68 members when the programmes from United Kingdom left the network after withdrawal of the country from the European Union. After each selection round, the EMT members elect the EMT Board, which decides on strategic issues. It consists of ten representatives from member universities and two representatives from DGT.

Why was the EMT set up?

There is a growing demand for highly qualified translators who can provide multilingual communication in both public and private sector. Due to evolving needs on the translation markets, translators need to cope with tasks combining wide range of linguistic, technical and entrepreneurial skills. It is important that translator training matches these requirements. In the broader context of the Bologna process, the project serves as a model in its approach to convergence in higher education in Europe.

What do EMT universities offer?

EMT programmes offer a Master's degree, corresponding to a one- or two-year programme in translation (between 60 and 120 points in the European Credit Transfer and Accumulation System (ECTS). At the core of each curriculum is a common set of basic skills in translation, regardless of the language combinations. The core of the EMT programmes is defined by the following six professional competences that graduates should acquire:

- translation service provision competence (including customer relationship management)
- language and intercultural competences (proficiency in source and target languages, text summary skills and ability to understand information containing cultural allusions)
- information mining competence (ability to search for information, by looking critically at various information sources)
- technological competence, especially in handling translation memories and terminology management
- domain-specific competence (knowledge in a specialist field for professional translation practice)

The EMT quality label

Only members of the EMT Network can use the EMT name and logo as a quality label when referring to their master’s programmes in translation. The logo is protected as a registered EU trademark. Members receive a membership certificate and sign the EMT charter, which sets out the obligations of EMT members.

Activities of the EMT network

EMT members meet twice a year to foster cooperation and exchange best practices in the training of future translators. The meetings can be on-site (in Brussels or hosted by EMT universities), online or hybrid. Between the full network meetings, the members meet within various working groups focusing on specific topics of the translation training. The working groups are chaired by the EMT Board members.

How are the activities of the EMT supported by the European Commission? The DGT supports the EMT by:

- organising the EMT Network meetings
- stimulating research cooperation between EMT universities
- promoting academia-business cooperation
- offering training placements and remote cooperation projects for EMT students.

The European Master's in Conference Interpreting has a similar approach.
