= CIUTI =

Conférence Internationale Permanente d'Instituts Universitaires de Traducteurs et Interprètes (French for International Standing Conference of University Institutes of Translators and Interpreters), abbreviated as CIUTI, is an international academy associating translation and interpretation institutes affiliated to universities.

== History ==
Founded in the 1960s, the institution aims at promoting international T&I cooperation in both professional training and academic research. The establishment of CIUTI was proposed by the universities of Geneva, Heidelberg, Mainz/Germersheim, Paris-Sorbonne, Saarbrücken and Trieste, in response to the high demand for competent translators and interpreters after World War II.

The CIUTI membership is open to institutions at the level of tertiary education only, and restricted to those who offer programs in translation, interpreting and multilingual communication. A set of high quality standards is attached to membership applications, which involves strict requirements on curriculum structure, research, academic infrastructure and resources of applicant institutions.
