= Cultural communication =

Study of communication between cultures

Cultural communication is the practice and study of how different cultures communicate within their community by verbal and nonverbal means. Cultural communication can also be referred to as intercultural communication and cross-cultural communication. Cultures are grouped together by a set of similar beliefs, values, traditions, and expectations which call all contribute to differences in communication between individuals of different cultures. Cultural communication is a practice and a field of study for many psychologists, anthropologists, and scholars. The study of cultural communication is used to study the interactions of individuals between different cultures. Studies done on cultural communication are utilized in ways to improve communication between international exchanges, businesses, employees, and corporations. Two major scholars who have influenced cultural communication studies are Edward T. Hall and Geert Hofstede. Edward T. Hall, who was an American anthropologist, is considered to be the founder of cultural communication and the theory of proxemics. The theory of proxemics focuses on how individuals use space while communicating depending on cultural backgrounds or social settings. The space in between individuals can be identified in four different ranges. For example, 0 inches signifies intimate space while 12 feet signifies public space. Geert Hofstede was a social psychologist who founded the theory of cultural dimension. In his theory, there are five dimensions that aim to measure differences between different cultures. The five dimensions are power distance, uncertainty avoidance, individualism versus collectivism, masculinity versus femininity, and Chronemics.

== Challenges ==
A related aspect is the concepts of high- and low-context communication. The first type refers to cultures where the meaning is mostly delivered in a less direct way and is based on context, tone, and nonverbal language, whereas low-context cultures tend to provide their information directly. Differences in high-context and low-context communication styles have been associated with misunderstandings in intercultural interactions.

The difference between cultures can also be a barrier to effective interpersonal interaction. For example, communication norms may differ from one culture to another, especially those relating to the need for silence or talking.

Another problem that is usually associated with cultural communication includes stereotyping, which may influence people's perceptions about others even before the start of any discussion. Stereotypes may cause people to make certain expectations about how their partners are going to behave and communicate without considering any specific cultural aspects of each individual's communication styles. Consequently, there is a possibility that such attitudes will have a negative effect on the perception of the message since people tend to respond to what they expect to happen rather than to the reality of the situation. Sometimes, these expectations may interfere with communication and increase the chances of misinterpretation.

Research suggests that intercultural awareness is associated with reduced misunderstandings in cross-cultural communication. Studies have found that distinguishing communication norms within various cultures increases the likelihood of understanding the messages as well as preventing misunderstandings caused by cultural perceptions. The notion of intercultural awareness has been implemented into pre-service teacher education and it is proved that lesson designs based on cultural differences enhance pre-service English teachers' skills regarding overcoming obstacles in intercultural communication. In the workplace, evidence shows that employees who become aware of differences in cross-cultural communication are capable of adapting their methods of communication in contrast to the norms of their culture.

=== Intercultural communicative competence (ICC) ===
ICC is a term referring to the capacity of a person to communicate effectively within intercultural contexts. Researchers have defined ICC as involving the integration of knowledge, skills, and attitude that allow an individual to interpret and react appropriately to intercultural communication situations.

== Non-Verbal Communication ==
Non-verbal communication is different cross culturally and one must take the time to study different cultures so as to fully understand the messages being transmitted because 70% of communication is not verbal, while only 30% is verbal. Different aspects of non-verbal communication can include facial expressions (happy, sad, angry, confused), which are interpreted differently around the world, eye contact (direct, no eye contact), body language (slouching, arm positioning, leg positioning, rocking motion, standing still), gestures (hand gestures, small gestures, big gestures, no gestures), touching (reaching out to someone, touching arm), and proxemics (distance between each other). Just how verbal language is different in every culture, non-verbal language is different as well. All aspects of language are culturally influenced based on what you observed and experienced when growing up, which is different in different parts of the world. Being able to combine the meanings of what is communicated verbally and non-verbally will give people the ability to fully understand what is occurring in an interaction with someone. Facial expressions can be useful in showing peoples emotions while they are talking, or even while they are not saying anything. Knowing what different emotions look like as facial expressions will help people in understanding what is being communicated to them without the use of words.

An example that can be used to explain how different non-verbal communication is in different areas of the world is eye contact. In the West, eye contact is used as a way of showing where your attention is, along with as a sign of being respectful to who is talking to you. In some Western societies, eye contact can be seen as confrontational. The meanings of the various aspects of non-verbal communication are different cross-culturally in different societies and areas of the world. Differences in non-verbal communication can cause cultural miscommunication if you are not educated on the practices of another culture when visiting, or talking to someone from that culture.

=== Power distance ===
Power distance is a cultural theory that measures how individuals in cultures view the unequal balance of power. Power distance can be divided into two concepts which are high power distance and low power distance. High power distance refers to a culture in which people of certain societal status have higher power and are revered and respected for having that power. In high power distance cultures, individuals who are considered to have higher power are given great deference and respect by those considered to have lower power, and they are often treated with great privilege in society. In low power distance cultures, those considered with high power such as managers or owners may try to level themselves with those considered lower power such as employees or interns by interacting with them and getting opinions on certain matters since the distribution of power is expected to be more equal. Power distance can be measured by the Power Distance Index. This index measures the degrees of inequality between different cultures. This scale ranges from 0 which would be considered low power distance cultures to 100 which is considered high power distance cultures. According to the index created by Geert Hofstede countries ranking higher on the power index scale are the Philippines, Venezuela, India, France, and Belgium. The countries that rank lower on the scale are Canada, Sweden, the United States, Norway, and Finland. Power distance has been studied in various ways by scholars, psychologists, and communication experts. A study was done by multiple communication experts from across the globe to show how power distance has an effect on voice tone variation and projection among different cultures. The study showed that individuals in a lower power distance culture had a negative reaction to lower voice levels than in high power distance cultures. The study also shows that voice control in those who have higher-level positions has an effect on an individual's power distance on beliefs towards, employees’ work attitudes, and work performance. Louder projection and certain tones have negative impacts on employees in low power distance cultures while those same projections and tones are normal for those in high power distance cultures. Another study was conducted to show the difference in justice perceptions such as work procedures and work interactions among employees and those in managerial positions. This study showed that Chinese employees (high power distance culture) react less negatively to criticism from those in managerial positions than American employees (low power distance culture). Americans expressed more frustration and negative justice perceptions than the Chinese employees. It is reasoned these findings are because China is considered to be a high power distance culture, so for individuals from a high power distance cultures tolerance is higher for inequality while the United States has a lower tolerance for inequality and those in a higher power. Power distance can be studied in a wide variety of ways to show how different cultures react to different levels of power. Travelers, businesses, employees, managers, and corporations use these studies to better understand how to communicate with different cultures in correct and appropriate ways.

== Individualism versus collectivism ==
Knowing how different cultures interact through language allows for cultural awareness and understanding. A major aspect of cultural communication is individualism versus collectivism. People in individualistic cultures value independence and tend to focus on those closest to them. People in collectivistic cultures think more as a group rather than as a single person. Individuals in individualistic cultures value their own wants, needs, and goals while individuals in collectivistic cultures value the wants, needs, and goals of the group above their own individual needs. Geert Hofstede who created the dimensions of national culture, conducted a study to determine the different cultural preferences of various nations to see where exactly countries sit on a scale. The scale ranges from 0 being a strong collectivistic country to 100 being a strong individualistic country. The scale also showed that the countries considered to be closer to 100 on the scale are statistically connected to the country's wealth. Countries considered to be high individualistic cultures are the US, Canada, Australia, and the United Kingdom. Countries considered to be low individualistic cultures are Guatemala, Ecuador, Panama, and Columbia. The countries listed here are considered to be poorer and the countries listed earlier are considered to be more affluent. Usually, societies and cultures that have a lot of freedom are considered to be individualistic, in these cultures people are expected to take care of and worry about themselves and look after their own families. In collectivistic cultures, individuals are expected to look after their entire group, village, or community rather than only looking after themselves. In collectivistic cultures, individuals see themselves as part of a collective and link themselves into groups and prioritize their groups’ goals over their own goals. While individualistic cultures can be a part of groups these individuals separate themselves from the group and consider themselves to be more independent from the group. Those in individualistic cultures think in terms of “me and I.” While those in collectivistic cultures think in terms of “we.” Both individualistic and collectivistic cultures involve how they work in groups and how they prioritize relationships and goals. Psychologists, scholars, and communication experts utilize the differences between cultures and individualistic versus collectivistic cultures to better understand language and the different dynamics of cultures.
