= China International Student Union =

Collegiate student oraganization in China

- Formation: 2020
- Website: mycisu.com

China International Student Union (CISU) is an independent representative body of international students enrolled at universities and institutions in China. The union was created to unite students from over 200 universities across China and also to campaign the March 28, 2020 temporary student visa restrictions put in place by the Chinese Communist Party (CCP) as a preventative measure against COVID-19. The platforms they use for communication with students and campaigning are Instagram and Twitter. Their campaign work has been mentioned in Times Higher Education and ICEF Monitor which referenced a poll that was carried out.

== Open letter addressed to Ministry of Foreign Affairs ==
CISU has written an open letter to China's Ministry of Foreign Affairs to provide students with a clear date regarding their return. Thousands of people have signed the Change.org petition.

Their letter was raised in a press conference to Wang Wenbin, to which he responded " Chinese authorities will study in a coordinated manner the matter of allowing foreign students to come back for their studies and maintain communication with relevant parties. I'll refer you to the competent department for more details.". The response has been deemed unsatisfactory by students as covered by PIE News.

Recently another letter was addressed to General Secretary of the Chinese Communist Party Xi Jinping to commemorate the 100th anniversary of the CCP which was mentioned in the South China Morning Post.
