= China Tourism Academy =

Chinese research institution

- Other name: 中国旅游研究院
- Established: June 6, 2008; 18 years ago
- Mission: To establish itself as policy think tank, industry brainpower and academic highland
- Focus: Tourism industry
- Owner: China National Tourism Administration
- Address: 10-11#Building 2, 9A Jianguomen Inner Street, 100005
- Location: Beijing, China
- Website: www.ctaweb.org.cn/en

China Tourism Academy (CTA; 中国旅游研究院) is a Beijing-based research institution with a focus on studies in tourism industry. Under the Document No. [2007] 98 released by the State Commission for Public Sector Reform, it was established in 2008, directly affiliated with the China National Tourism Administration (CNTA).

The academy is organised into academic and administrative divisions. For the academic part, it comprises four individual Institutes looking to Tourism Policy and Strategy Studies, Tourism Industry and Enterprise Development, Regional Tourism Planning and Development, and International Tourism Development respectively. In addition, there are twelve independently run subsidiaries affiliated to CTA, including two branch offices located in Kunming and Wuhan, two targeted research centers for Tourism in Taiwan and Western China, along with seven specialised institutions exploring topics including tourism theories, tourism standardisation, hospitality, market development and destination marketing, tourism safety and security, tourism impact analysis, urban tourism and tourism vocational education.

The scope of CTA's research activities is quite broad, partly due to its position as the research arm of the National Tourism Administration. It regularly hosts national conferences and forums, inviting both scholars and businesses related to the industry. It is also capable of conducting surveys on national bases, which very much facilitates its annually issued Annual Development Report of China's Tourism.

In 2013, CTA partnered with the Italian marketing and communications firm Select Holding. This led to the establishment of the necessary basis for the constitution of Welcome Chinese, an hospitality standard, brand and company with the goal to help Chinese tourists feel more comfortable, easier to travel and feel welcome overseas. CTA agreed to promote the Welcome Chinese project and to privilege participants who have implemented the standard by recommending them to the Chinese travel industry.
