= China National Tourism Administration =

Former government agency in China

- 国家旅游局; Guójiā Lǚyóu Jú
- National Emblem

Agency overview
- Formed: 1982; 44 years ago
- Dissolved: March 19, 2018
- Superseding agency: Ministry of Culture and Tourism
- Type: National
- Jurisdiction: China
- Headquarters: Beijing
- Agency executive: Li Jinzao (李金早), Chairman
- Parent agency: State Council
- Website: cnta.gov.cn (archived)

The China National Tourism Administration (CNTA) was a Chinese government authority responsible for the development of tourism affairs and was subordinate to the State Council. Its headquarters were in Beijing.

== History ==
The predecessor was the China Travel and Tourism Enterprise Administration (later renamed the China Travel and Tourism Administration) established in 1964. It was once an agency directly under the State Council in charge of tourism. The CNTA was dissolved on March 19, 2018, as part of the deepening the reform of the Party and state institutions; the duties are merged to the Ministry of Culture and Tourism.

== Functions ==
CNTA did not have the authority of a full department within the Chinese government to enforce regulations, but in other respects acted as a ministry. Provincial CNTA offices in each Chinese province reported to the central office in Beijing. CNTA had eighteen overseas offices called CNTO (China National Tourism Offices) charged with promoting tourism to China.

CNTA was unique as a tourism office in that it is also responsible for controlling the outflow of tourists from China abroad.

CNTA contained The Office of National Red Tourism Coordination Group (ONRTCG or 'the Red Office'), in charge of red tourism.

== List of chairmen ==
- Liu Yi (刘毅, 1988–1995)
- He Guangwei (何光暐, 1995–2005)
- Shao Qiwei (邵琪伟, 2005–2014)
- Li Jinzao (李金早, 2014–2018)

== Agency Structure ==
The agency is organized into the following areas.

- Office (Comprehensive Coordination Department)
- Department of Policy and Legal Affairs
- Department of Tourism Promotion and International Liaison
- Department of Planning
- Development and Finance
- Department of Quality Standardization and Administration
- Department of Affairs on Tourism of Hong Kong
- Macau & Taiwan, Department of Personnel
- Party Committee, Office of Retired Cadres

=== Directly administered agencies ===
- Service Center of CNTA
- Information Center of CNTA
- China Tourism Association, formerly known as the China National Tourism Institute
- China Tourism News Office
- China Travel and Tourism Press
- China Tourism Management Institute
- China Tourism Management Institute

=== Subordinate Associations ===
- China Association of Travel Services
- China Tourist Hotels Association
- China Tourism Automobile and Cruise Association and China Association of Tourism Journals

== Tourist Attraction Rating Categories ==
The organisation administers the five Tourist Attraction Rating Categories, ranging from A (lowest) to AAAAA (highest).

== See also ==
- China Travel Service
- Tourism in China
- Tourism-related institutions in China
- iperu, tourist information and assistance
- Visitor center
