= List of Beijing International Studies University people =

This is a list of notable alumni, faculty and staff associated with Beijing International Studies University, or with its predecessor, the subsidiary foreign languages institute of Xinhua News Agency. Individuals are sorted by category and alphabetised within each category.

== Notable alumni ==
=== Politics and foreign affairs ===
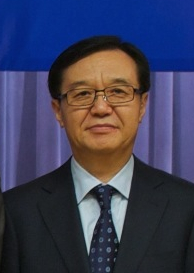
Gao Hucheng

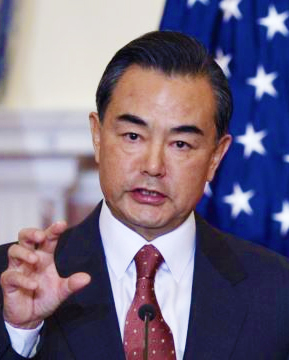
Wang Yi

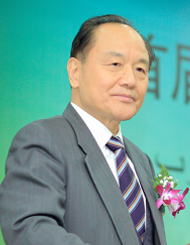
Wu Sike

- Chen Jian, BA 1973, Spanish studies – vice minister of commerce of PRC
- Fan Xiaoli, BA 1979, Japanese studies – head of the United Front Work Department of the CPC Guangxi Committee
- Gao Hucheng, BA 1972, French studies – incumbent Chinese minister of commerce
- Li Jianhua, BA 1965, Arabic studies – counsellor of Chinese embassies in Syria and Egypt; officer at the Department of Asian and African Affairs and the Bureau for Chinese Diplomatic Missions Abroad, Ministry of Foreign Affairs
- Liu Chunxian, BA 1965, Japanese studies – Major General of the People's Liberation Army
- Liu Hongcai, BA 1972, Japanese studies – incumbent Chinese ambassador to North Korea; former Vice Minister of the International Department (IDCPC)
- Liu Zhentang, BA 1965, Arabic studies – former Chinese ambassador to Lebanon and Iran
- Qiu Xuejun, BA 1985, English studies – deputy director-general of the Department of Consular Affairs, Ministry of Foreign Affairs; former consul general of the Chinese embassy in the United States
- Wang Yi, BA 1977, Japanese studies – incumbent Chinese foreign minister
- Wu Sike, BA 1965, Arabic studies – incumbent special envoy to the Middle East; former Chinese ambassador to Saudi Arabia and Egypt
- Yang Chengxu, Nd 1962, training program – former Chinese ambassador to Austria; former chair of PECC China and CIIS President
- Yu Hailin, BA 1994, Arabic studies – officer of the International Department; titled China's Youth Excellence for Foreign Affairs in 2005, Beijing 2008 Olympic torch-bearer

=== Academia, arts and literature ===
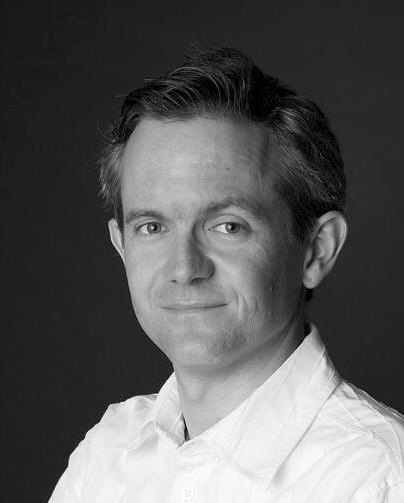
Simon Chesterman

- Simon Chesterman, Nd 1991, Chinese Language Exchange Program – dean and law professor at the National University of Singapore
- Liu Liqun, BA 1972, German studies – researcher at Chinese Academy of Social Sciences, director of China Institute for European Studies, director and secretary of China Institute for German Studies
- Liu Yueqin, BA 1974–1978, Arabic studies – researcher at Chinese Academy of Social Sciences
- Wu Diandian, BA 2005, Chinese Literature, MA at Columbia University (East Asian Languages and Cultures) – cultural scholar and musician, member of American Pianists Association, China National Artist Association and China Association of Popular Music; having held solo concerts at Carnegie Hall in 2011, incumbent chief educational director and global cultural ambassador at U.S.-China International Development Network
- Yang Jianhua (Peter Yang), BA 1971, German studies, MA 1979, German studies, PhD 1996 at University of Utah, German studies, PhD 2014, Ruhr University Bochum, sustainability studies; associate professor of German and Chinese studies at Case Western Reserve University
- Yue Xiaodong, BA 1977, English studies – registered psychologist, professor of psychology at the City University of Hong Kong
- Zhu Xiaoxue, BA 1972, German studies, PhD at University of Paderborn, German studies – professor of German studies

=== News and media ===
- Chai Ye, BA 1972, German studies – director of Guangming Daily International, former chief correspondent based in Austria and Germany
- Guan Rui, BA 1971, Arabic studies – director and chief translator of China Radio International Arabic Channel; bestowed China News Prize, China Broadcasting Prize and China International News Prize; bestowed
- Ma Ling BA 1979–1983, Japanese studies – senior journalist, political commentator and writer; editor-in-chiefof the Hong Kong monthly magazine Panorama, former executive director at Ta Kung Pao; author of Hu Jintao, Wen Jiabao, etc.
- Xue Yongxing, BA 1971–1975, English studies – director and editor-in-chief, Xinhua News Agency Asia-Pacific
- Zhang Bo (news anchor), BA 2003, Arabic studies – news anchor of CCTV Arabic Channel
- Zhao Lifan, BA 1965, English studies – former deputy editor-in-chief and senior journalist of CCTV; contemporary artist and calligrapher, trustee of Chinese Poetry Academy and Chinese Calligraphers Association, entitled to the State Council Special Allowance since 1992; BISU BISU honorary professor of the Shan-Shui Painting Institute since 2004;
- Zhou Yijun, BA 1994, Arabic studies – host and journalist at Phoenix Television; former Xinhua correspondent to Gaza
- Zhu Mengkui, BA 1964, Arabic studies – senior journalist at People's Daily International

=== Film, television and music ===
- Ann Hu, BA 1977, English studies – female Chinese-American film director, whose directorial debut Shadow Magic found huge response overseas and won 2 awards at Taipei Golden Horse Film Festival 2000
- Shu Chang, BA 2004, English studies – Chinese actress, singer, and television host
- Wang Xinbo, BA ?, English studies – one of the most influential music producers in China; he jointly formed the school band Wan Li Ma Wang when studying at the university, which is known to be the oldest rock band from China.

=== Sports and athletics ===
- Dong Fangxiao, BA 2004, English studies – former Chinese artistic gymnast, Chinese-NZ gymnastic coach
- Guo Liping, BA 2004, English studies – Chinese Xiangqi player; National Xiangqi Grand Master since 1998, National Xiangqi Champion Women Division in 2002 and 2004, World Xiangqi Champion Women Division in 2003 and 2005
- Guo Qing, MMgt 1999, Tourism Management – 29th Olympic Committee Roads and Transport Authority; COC Excellent Staff and Beijing 2008 Olympic torch-bearer
- Li Mingjia, BA ?, English studies – 29th Olympic Committee Communications Department, Beijing 2008 Olympic torch-bearer
- Liu Hongyu, BA 2004, English studies – Women's 20-Kilometre Race-Walk Champion of the 1999 IAAF World Championship, Spain
- Yuan Yanping, BA 2004, English studies – Summer Paralympic Judo gold medallist for Women's +70 kg in 2008 and 2012
- Zhang Jilong, BA 1972, English studies – Chinese football administrator, incumbent executive president of Asian Football Federation
- Zhang Yuning (footballer, born 1977), BA 2011, English studies – Chinese international soccer player

=== Business and services ===
- Chang Zhenming, BA 1979–1983, Japanese studies – chairman of CITIC Group, chairman and managing director of CITIC Pacific
- Gai Zhixin, BA 1974–1978, French studies – chairman and CEO of CITS Group Corporation, president and legal representative of China International Travel Service Limited, Head Office, and chair of China Association of Travel Services
- He Guangbei, B 1975-1979 – vice chairman and chief executive officer of BOC Hong Kong Holdings and Bank of China (Hong Kong)

== Faculty and staff ==
=== Government, law, and public policy ===
- An Yuxiang, adjunct professor at the Department of Korean studies – deputy director-general of Chinese Service Center for Scholarly Exchange (CSCSE); former counsellor of the Chinese embassy in South Korea
- Du Jiang, president 1999-2006 – vice chairman of China National Tourism Administration, former Beijing Municipal Commission of Tourism Development; President of China Tourism Academy, vice-president of China Tourism Association; entitled to the Chinese State Council Special Allowance
- Fu Hua, adjunct professor at the Institute for Transcultural studies – deputy secretary-general of Beijing CPC Municipal Committee
- Lei Wen, vice president 1964-1984 – administration officer of Beijing Railway Bureau; principal of Xinhua Foreign Languages Institute
- Li Chang (1914-2010), president 1964-1966 – former vice president of Chinese Academy of Sciences; former secretary of CPC Central Commission for Discipline Inspection
- Wei Xiao'an, adjunct professor of tourism management, PhD supervisor – policy and regulations director, China National Tourism Administration, scientific committee director of China Tourism Academy
- Zhou Xiqing (1915-2004), emeritus professor of English and Japanese linguistics 1973-? – former State Council Consellor

=== Language and literature ===
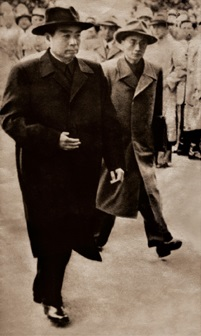
Guan Zhenhu (the young man in the wind coat behind Zhou Enlai) at Geneva Conference, 1954

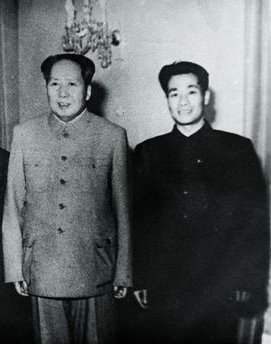
Li Yueran with Mao Zedong in Soviet Union, 1957

- Chen Maoxin, emeritus professor of English studies – Lifetime Achievement Award in Translation (Note: Lifetime Achievement Award in Translation, Chinese: 中国翻译协会资深翻译家荣誉称号; the notion of Lifetime Achievement Award in Translation is available at "TAC celebrates its 30th anniversary in Beijing". Translators Association of China. 6 December 2012. Archived from the original on 30 October 2013.) bestowed by TAC
- Martin Forstner, adjunct professor since 2010 – professor of Arabic studies at University of Mainz; CIUTI President (1996-2006), CIUTI General Secretary (2006–present)
- Guan Zhenhu (1926-2011), emeritus professor of French studies and English studies 1964-1994 – BA at Fudan (English studies), Lifetime Achievement Award in Translation bestowed by TAC, entitled to State Council Special Allowance; UNESCO advisor, translator for Zhou Enlai during the Geneva Conference; former editor/translator at Xinhua News Agency
- Huang Jinjia, emeritus professor of English studies -1988 – Lifetime Achievement Award in Translation bestowed by TAC in 2011
- Hannelore Lee-Jahnke, adjunct professor since 2010 – professor of translation studies at University of Geneva; CIUTI President (2006–present)
- Li Chuansong, emeritus professor of German studies 1964-, Institute for Transcultural Studies academic counsellor – BA at BFSU, German studies; Lifetime Achievement Award in Translation bestowed by TAC in 2009, entitled to State Council Special Allowance; former translator and interpreter at the China Council for the Foreign Cultural Relations (1955-1964), former trustee of Beijing Higher Education Academy
- Li Yueran (1927-2003), emeritus professor of Russian studies – chief Russian Interpreter of the CPC Central Committee; Lifetime Achievement Award in Translation bestowed by TAC
- Liu Yanzhang, emeritus professor of Russian studies – Lifetime Achievement Award in Translation bestowed by TAC
- Lv Guojun, emeritus professor of Russian studies and English studies – Lifetime Achievement Award in Translation bestowed by TAC
- Lv Longgen, Professor of Spanish studies – BA at Peking University (1965, Spanish Language and Literature), BFSU adjunct professor; Beijing Municipal Administration of Tourism Expert Committee since 2003
- Shi Meizhen, TEP Senior French Editor – Lifetime Achievement Award in Translation bestowed by TAC in 2009
- Shu Yu, emeritus professor of German studies 1964- – National Outstanding Lecturer (Note: National Outstanding Lecturer, Chinese: 全国优秀教师) titled by MOE in 1998; Lifetime Achievement Award in Translation bestowed by TAC in 2009, entitled to State Council Special Allowance; former trustee of China German Language Education Association and China German Literature Studies Association
- Su Qi, emeritus professor of Japanese studies – Lifetime Achievement Award in Translation bestowed by TAC
- Tang Lunyi, emeritus professor of German studies 1983-2006 – Lifetime Achievement Award in Translation bestowed by TAC in 2011
- David Noel Tool, professor of Applied Linguistics 2001–present – former U.S. army colonel; titled Capital's 10 Most Outstanding Volunteers by Beijing Volunteers' Association in 2006, Beijing 2008 torch-bearer
- Wang Wenjiong, emeritus professor of English studies – Lifetime Achievement Award in Translation bestowed by TAC
- Wang Zhiyou, emeritus professor of German studies – Lifetime Achievement Award in Translation bestowed by TAC
- Zhang Daoyi, president of Beijing International Studies University 1983–1987, emeritus professor of English studies – Lifetime Achievement Award in Translation bestowed by TAC in 2009
- Zhang Zhihua, emeritus professor of Arabic studies 1973-1993 – Lifetime Achievement Award in Translation bestowed by TAC in 2011
- Zhao Huazhi, emeritus professor of English studies, TEP Senior English Editor – Lifetime Achievement Award in Translation bestowed by TAC in 2009

=== Arts and humanities ===
- Chen Zhongyi, adjunct professor at the Institute for Transcultural Studies – director of the Foreign Literature Research Institute, Chinese Academy of Social Sciences
- Jia Yunfeng, adjunct professor of tourism management, professional doctorate supervisor – China media consultant for Government of Ontario, Canada, chief consultant of Chinese Taipei Tourism Association
- Liu Yida, adjunct professor at the School of International Communication – senior columnist and news reporter of Beijing Evening News; awarded the National Top 100 Outstanding Journalists
- Wang Keping, professor of Aesthetics and Transcultural Studies – director of the CASS Institute of Philosophy, vice chairman of International Society for Universal Dialogue; entitled to the Chinese State Council Special Allowance since 1998
- Yu Guoming, adjunct professor at the School of International Communication – associate dean of School of Journalism and Communication and director of the Public Opinion Research Center, Renmin University, China

=== Economics and business ===
- Ai Xuejiao, adjunct professor of business management, MBA supervisor – crisis management expert, EMBA Distinguished Professor at Peking University
- Hai Yan, or Si Haiyan, adjunct professor of tourism and hospitality management, PhD and Professional Doctorate supervisor – chairman of China Tourist Hotels Association (CTHA), SVP of Jinjiang International, CEO of Kunlun Hotel Group; bestowed 2003 Top 10 National Cultural Figure, the "most successful Chinese commercial fiction writer of this decade", member of China Writer Association
- Huang Deman, adjunct professor of hospitality management – chairman of Vienna Hotels
- Xiao Qianhui, adjunct professor of tourism and hospitality management, PhD supervisor – General Manager of Shanghai Spring International Travel Service Group
- Jeremy Xu, adjunct professor of tourism and hospitality management, PhD and Professional Doctorate supervisor – executive director and General Manager of China Travel International Investment Hong Kong
- Yao Wang, adjunct professor of international trade, PhD and Professional Doctorate supervisor – executive director of the Boao Forum for Asia; Vice President of China Academy of International Trade (CAIT), president of Beijing Academy of International Economy and Trade
- Ye Haihua, adjunct professor of tourism and hospitality management, Professional Doctorate supervisor – CEO of InterContinental Hotels Group Greater China
- Zhang Rungang, adjunct professor of tourism and hospitality management, PhD and professional doctorate supervisor – deputy general manager of Beijing Tourism Group, chairman of Beijing Capital Tourism Co., Ltd.

=== Athletics and sports ===
- Zhang Yan, PE Department 2007–present – taekwondo head coach of 2012 National University Games, taekwondo referee of 2011 and 2013 National Taekwondo Championship and 2013 National Games

== Friends of BISU ==
=== Honorary faculty ===
- Jean-Pierre Boisivon, honorary professor – managing director of ESSEC Business School
- Chen Haosu, honorary dean of the School of English Language, Literature and Culture – the 8th chairperson of the Chinese People's Association for Friendship with Foreign Countries
- Karl-Dieter Bünting, honorary professor – linguist of German language, professor of University of Duisburg-Essen
- Duan Qiang, honorary professor – president of Beijing Tourism Group
- John Grant, honorary professor – deputy vice-chancellor of University of Canberra
- Huang Youyi, honorary dean, Institute of China Translation Development – CPPCC National Committee, VP of the China International Publishing Group
- Yoshikazu Morita, honorary professor – president of Kyoto University of Foreign Studies
- Kazuo Ozawa, honorary professor – former president of Yokohama College of Commerce
- Alexander Radkov, honorary professor – head of the Federal Agency for Tourism, Russia
- Friedhelm Schwamm, honorary professor – Ministerialrat for Ministry of Culture of Rheinland-Pfalz, Germany
- Terabe Seiki, honorary professor – president of Aichi Gakusen University
- Wang Fuxiang, honorary professor – president of Beijing Foreign Studies University (1984-1997)

=== Notable figures on campus ===
Compared to the individuals mentioned above, the people listed here are not necessarily well-known or officially recognized. However, they are consistent participants in campus life and are among the familiar figures to BISU students.

- Liu Tongyan – courier of Shentong Express serving at the North Gate of BISU, 2008-2013
- Zhang Zhongpu, ??-?? – former typographer of BISU Printing House, 1965-1980 (officially retired), 1980-1989

== Bibliography ==
- "Beijing International Studies University Alumni Association".
- "Chapter 10". BISU Online Histories (1964-2009). Archived from the original on 14 October 2013.
- "Notable Alumni". BISU Admissions.
- "Open Day 2012 Special Issue" (PDF). BISU Newspaper. Vol. 528. BISU Newspaper Editorial. 7 April 2012. p. 8.
- Public Relations Office (31 December 2009). "40th Anniversary". BMC.
- "List of Beijing International Studies University PhD supervisors". Graduate Office. 16 October 2013.
- "List of Beijing International Studies University Professional Doctorate supervisors". Graduate Office. 16 October 2013.
