= CIIS =

CIIS may refer to:

- California Institute of Integral Studies in San Francisco, United States
- China Institute of International Studies in Beijing, China
- College of Innovation and Industry Skills in Perth, Australia
- Continental Institute of International Studies in India
