= Pacific Trade and Development Conference =

Informal private academic conference series

Pacific Trade and Development Conference (PAFTAD)
- Secretariat: Australian National University
- Type: Economic Conference
- Establishment: 1968
- Website http://www.paftad.org

The Pacific Trade and Development Conference (PAFTAD) is an informal private academic conference series that, since its origins in 1968, has developed into a driving force behind the development of thought on Pacific trade and development issues and important economic policy questions facing the region.

The ideas and discussions generated by PAFTAD have helped drive and shape other Pacific economic cooperation organisations, including Asia Pacific Economic Cooperation (APEC) and the Pacific Economic Cooperation Council (PECC).

Each PAFTAD conference is organised around a particular theme, and research papers addressing the topic are presented and discussed. The results are published in the PAFTAD volume series.

== History ==
Since its inception in 1968 the PAFTAD conference series has established itself as one of the leading sources of ideas and discussion on issues affecting economic development in the Asia Pacific. A private organisation with no formal government ties, PAFTAD has been, and continues to be a driving force for ideas about policy innovation and development at both the national and regional levels.

The essence of PAFTAD’s contribution is both intellectual and practical: it generates ideas about regional economic exchange and integration, provides empirical evidence to support or reject policy proposals and facilitates ongoing debate among policy influential experts. The ideas and evidence generated by PAFTAD have entered the public policy dialogue of most Asia Pacific economies, due in no small part to the intellectual and policy leadership shown by PAFTAD participants at both a national and regional level.

== 34th PAFTAD Conference - Beijing 2009 ==
Theme: “China’s Role in the World Economy”

Host: China Centre for Economic Research (CCER), Peking University

== Fellowship for Young Scholars ==
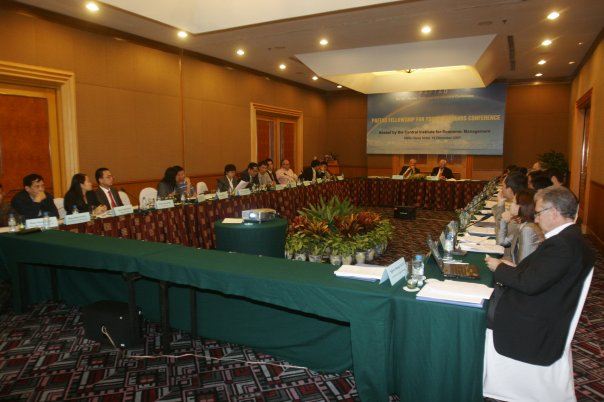
Young Fellows at PAFTAD 32 in Vietnam.

The PAFTAD Fellowship for Young Scholars is available to graduate students and faculty members aged 35 years and below, and is considered one of the most distinguished fellowships available to young scholars in the region. The PAFTAD International Steering Committee selects 8 aspiring researchers as PAFTAD Fellows to present papers on themes related to Asia Pacific trade and economic development for each conference. Selection is based on the quality of a written submission as judged by the Selection Panel from PAFTAD’s distinguished International Steering Committee.

This year the Fellowships will take young scholars to Beijing where they will present their papers the day prior to PAFTAD's 34th Conference on December 6 and participate in the PAFTAD Conference itself on 7–9 December.

== International Steering Committee Members ==
As of 2024, the International Steering Committee members are:

Dr M Chatib Basri, University of Indonesia

Dr Chul Chung, Korea Institute for International Economic Policy

Professor Evelyn S Devadason, University of Malaya

Dr David Dollar, Brookings Institution

Professor Yiping Huang, Peking University

Dr Francis Hutchinson, ISEAS-Yusof Ishak Institute

Professor Chen Lin, The University of Hong Kong

Dr Chien-Fu Lin, Taiwan Institute of Economic Research

Professor Akira Kohsaka, Osaka University

Professor Juan J Palacios, University of Guadalajara

Professor Mari Pangestu (Chair), University of Indonesia

Dr Poonam Gupta, National Council of Applied Economic Research

Dr Somkiat Tangkitvanich, Thailand Development Research Institute

Dr Anna Strutt, University of Waikato

Professor Yves Tiberghien, University of British Columbia

Professor Shujiro Urata, Waseda University

Dr Vo Tri Thanh, Central Institute for Economic Management

== PAFTAD Endowment ==
The PAFTAD endowment was established in 1999 to support the activities of the PAFTAD.

== Previous Conference Themes ==
• Asia Pacific Trade and Development

• Direct Foreign Investment in Asia and the Pacific

• Obstacles to Trade in the Pacific Area

• Structural Adjustments in Asian-Pacific Trade

• Technology Transfer in Pacific Economic Development

• Cooperation and Development in the Asia Pacific Region: Relations between Large and Small Countries

• Trade and Employment in Asia and the Pacific

• Mineral and Energy Resources in the Pacific Area

• Regional energy security

• ASEAN in a Changing Pacific and World Economy

• Trade and Growth of the Advanced Developing Countries in the Pacific Basin

• Renewable Resources in the Pacific

• Energy and Structural Change in the Asia Pacific Region

• Pacific Growth and Financial Interdependence

• Industrial Policies for Pacific Economic Growth

• Pacific Trade in Services

• Technological Challenge in the Asia-Pacific Economy

• The Pacific Economy: Growth and External Stability

• Economic Reform and Internationalization: China and the Pacific Region

• Pacific Dynamism and the International Economic System Corporate Links and Foreign Direct Investment in Asia and the Pacific

• Environment and Development in the Pacific: Problems and Policy Options

• Business, Markets and Government in the Asia Pacific: Competition Policy, Convergence and Pluralism

• Asia Pacific Financial Deregulation

• APEC: Challenges and Tasks for the 21st Century

• Globalization and the Asia Pacific Economy

• The New Economy in East Asia and the Pacific

• Competition Policy in the New Millennium

• Reshaping the Asia Pacific Economic Order

• Does Trade Deliver what it Promises?

• Multinational Corporations and the Rise of a Network Economy in the Pacific Rim

• International and Regional Institutions and Asia Pacific Development

• The Politics and the Economics of Integration in Asia and the Pacific

== Notable alumni ==
Numerous PAFTAD alumni have occupied senior political and policy positions in regional governments and organisations, with Indonesian Minister of Trade Mari Pangestu, a long-time PAFTAD participant, being a recent example. The extent of PAFTAD’s contribution to regional development was apparent in the formation of APEC.

Two of PAFTAD’s earliest leaders, Professor Sir John Crawford and Dr Saburo Okita, were instrumental in leading their countries to establish the tripartite Pacific Economic Cooperation Committee (PECC). In turn PECC, which shares many members in common with PAFTAD, developed recognition among nations of the region of the need for a framework to support and enhance the rapid growth in regional trade, investment and technology transfer: APEC.
