= Anna Strutt =

New Zealand economics academic

Academic background
- Education: University of Adelaide
- Thesis: Economic growth, trade policy and the environment in Indonesia (1998)

Anna Strutt is a New Zealand academic, and is a full professor of economics at the University of Waikato, specialising in international policy analysis.

== Academic career ==
Strutt completed a PhD titled Economic growth, trade policy and the environment in Indonesia at the University of Adelaide in 1998. Strutt then joined the faculty of the University of Waikato in 1996, rising to full professor in 2019. Strutt was the Chairperson of the Economics Department in 2016–17, and since 2019 has been the Academic Director Asia Programmes and Agreements at the Waikato Management School.

Strutt's research centres on the analysis of international policy. She conducts quantitative analysis using general equilibrium models. Strutt teaches on international economics, economic policy analysis, and global trade modelling.

Strutt has advised or consulted to a variety of national and international organizations, including the Mekong Institute, Asian Development Bank, the United Nations' Food and Agriculture Organization, the World Bank, and the Australian Productivity Commission. She has been a Visiting Fellow at the University of Adelaide, and is a Research Fellow at Purdue University, and teaches into their annual short course, covering global trade analysis and preferential trade agreements. Strutt has been on the Pacific Trade and Development International Steering Committee since 2019, and is an advisor to the Asia-Pacific Research and Training Network on Trade since 2020. She is an associate editor of the Journal of Global Economic Analysis.

== Selected works ==
- Anderson, Kym; Bernard Hoekman; Strutt, Anna (2001). "Agriculture and the WTO: Next Steps". Review of International Economics. 9 (2): 192–214. doi:10.1111/1467-9396.00274. Wikidata Q124738140.
- Strutt, Anna (2000). "Will Trade Liberalization Harm the Environment? The Case of Indonesia to 2020". Environmental and Resource Economics. 17 (3): 203–232. doi:10.1023/a:1026480823657. Wikidata Q124735096.
- Anderson, Kym; Strutt, Anna (2014). "Food security policy options for China: Lessons from other countries". Food Policy. 49: 50–58. doi:10.1016/j.foodpol.2014.06.008. Wikidata Q124735081.
- Anderson, Kym; Strutt, Anna (2012). "The changing geography of world trade: Projections to 2030". Journal of Asian Economics. 23 (4): 303–323. doi:10.1016/j.asieco.2012.02.001. Wikidata Q124735084.
- Anderson, Kym; Strutt, Anna (2014). "Emerging economies, productivity growth and trade with resource‐rich economies by 2030". Australian Journal of Agricultural and Resource Economics. 58 (4): 590–606. doi:10.1111/1467-8489.12039. Wikidata Q124735080.
- Strutt, Anna; Turner, James; Robert A. Haack; Lars Olson (2013). "Evaluating the impacts of an international phytosanitary standard for wood packaging material: Global and United States trade implications". Forest Policy and Economics. 27: 54–64. doi:10.1016/j.forpol.2012.11.003. Wikidata Q57048571.
- Anderson, Kym; Shikha Jha; Signe Nelgen; Strutt, Anna (2012). "Re-examining policies for food security in Asia". Food Security. 5 (2): 195–215. doi:10.1007/s12571-012-0237-5. Wikidata Q124735082.
