= Weldon B. Gibson =

American economist (1917–2001)

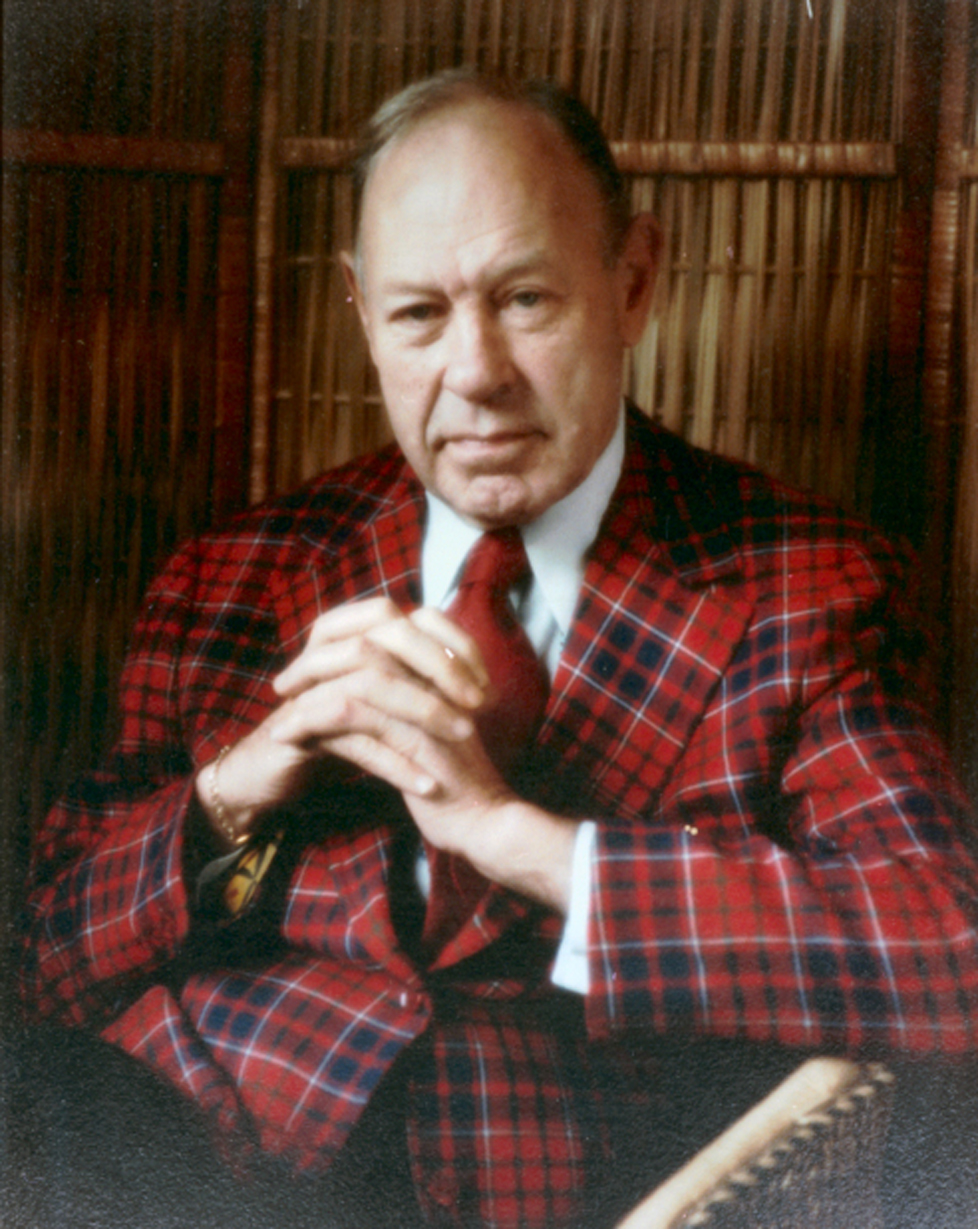
- Born: April 23, 1917; Eldorado, Texas
- Died: May 6, 2001 (aged 84); Stanford, California
- Education: Washington State University; Stanford University
- Spouse: Helen Mears
- Awards: Legion of Merit; Commander of the Order of the British Empire; WSU Distinguished Alumni Award
- Scientific career
- Workplaces: SRI International

Weldon Bailey "Hoot" Gibson CBE (April 23, 1917 - May 6, 2001) was an economist and a longtime executive at SRI International (previously the Stanford Research Institute), where he worked full-time from 1947 until 1988, and part-time as Senior Director Emeritus until his death. He was closely associated with the organization, and was known as "Mr. SRI".

== Early life and education ==
Gibson was the son of farmers in Eldorado, Texas who were hit hard by the Great Depression, but still managed to send Gibson to Washington State University (WSU), due in part to assistance from his uncle Arthur "Buck" Bailey, a noted baseball coach at WSU. He was on the Washington State Cougars football team, and Sports Illustrated named him as a member of the "Sports Illustrated Silver Anniversary All America Team" in 1962. He was a member of the Beta Theta Pi fraternity, and graduated from WSU with a degree in business administration in 1938. Later in life, Gibson would organize the Washington State University Foundation.

He then attended Stanford University, where Gibson received an MBA in 1940 and a Ph.D. in 1950, both from the Stanford Graduate School of Business. While at Stanford, he met Helen Mears, the daughter of one of his professors, and married her in 1941.

== Career ==
Gibson served in the United States Army Air Corps during World War II, specifically from 1941 to 1946, where he was director of materiel requirements. He retired from the corps as a colonel and assistant director of the Air Force Institute of Technology in Dayton, Ohio.

Gibson then moved to California to attend Stanford University, where he learned about the Stanford Research Institute (SRI) before it had officially launched; he was SRI's third staff member. He joined SRI as the chairman of business and economics, and became chairman of the organization's international programs soon thereafter. Gibson organized over 80 international conferences for business executives; some include the International Industrial Conference, the International Industrial Development Conference and the Pacific Basin Economic Council. He also created the SRI International Associates Program, which involved about 800 companies in 63 countries. His position also involved a significant amount of international travel to a wide variety of places.

Gibson also served as the president of the Palo Alto Chamber of Commerce in 1956. Also in 1956, Gibson was named the associate director of SRI; in 1959, he was named its vice president, and in 1960 he was its executive vice president. In 1982 he was the organization's senior director, and in 1988 he was named senior director emeritus.

== Memberships and awards ==
In 1946, Gibson was awarded the Legion of Merit, and in 1947 the order of Commander of the Order of the British Empire.

Gibson was given the Washington State University Distinguished Alumni Award for his role in creating the WSU Foundation. He is the namesake for the Gibson Achievement Award, established in 1999, which is for an employee of SRI International that has a significant impact on society's standard of living and prosperity.

== Selected publications ==
- Gibson, Weldon B. (1980). SRI: The Founding Years. Los Altos, California: Stanford Research Institute. ISBN 0-913232-80-7.
- Gibson, Weldon B. (1986). SRI: The Take-Off Days. Los Altos, California: Stanford Research Institute. ISBN 0-86576-103-5.
- Gibson, Weldon B. (1989). Buck Bailey: The Making of a Legend. Washington State University Alumni Association.
