= 6th G7 summit =

1980 international leader meeting in Italy

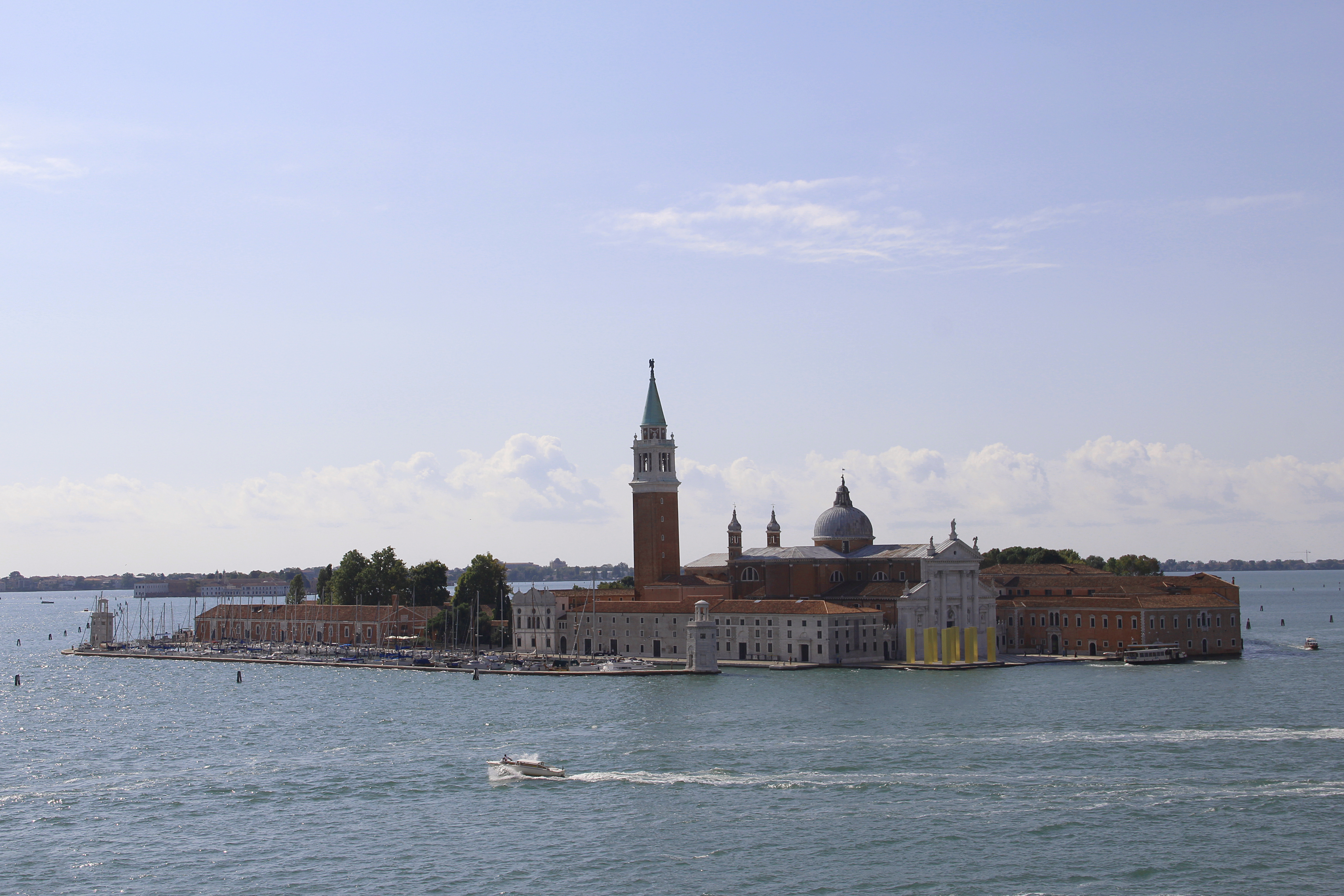
- San Giorgio Maggiore in Venice
- Host country: Italy
- Dates: 22–23 June 1980
- Cities: Venice
- Venues: San Giorgio Maggiore
- Follows: 5th G7 summit
- Precedes: 7th G7 summit

The 6th G7 Summit was held at Venice, Italy, between 22 and 23 June 1980. The venue for the summit meetings was the island of San Giorgio Maggiore in the Venetian lagoon.

The Group of Seven (G7) was an unofficial forum which brought together the heads of the richest industrialized countries: France, West Germany, Italy, Japan, the United Kingdom, the United States, Canada (since 1976), and the president of the European Commission (starting officially in 1981). The summits were not meant to be linked formally with wider international institutions; and in fact, a mild rebellion against the stiff formality of other international meetings was a part of the genesis of cooperation between France's president Valéry Giscard d'Estaing and West Germany's chancellor Helmut Schmidt as they conceived the first Group of Six (G6) summit in 1975.

== Leaders at the summit ==
The G7 is an unofficial annual forum for the leaders of Canada, the European Commission, France, West Germany, Italy, Japan, the United Kingdom and the United States. Japanese prime minister Masayoshi Ōhira suffered a fatal heart attack on 12 June, only days before the summit; and his colleague, Foreign Minister Saburō Ōkita, led the delegation which represented Japan in his place. Others joining Ōkita in Venice were Finance Minister Noboru Takeshita and the Minister of International Trade and Industry Yoshitake Sasaki who attended the foreign minister's meeting in Ōkita's place.

The 6th G7 summit was the last summit for French president Valéry Giscard d'Estaing and US president Jimmy Carter. It was also the first and only summit for Italian prime minister Francesco Cossiga.

=== Participants ===
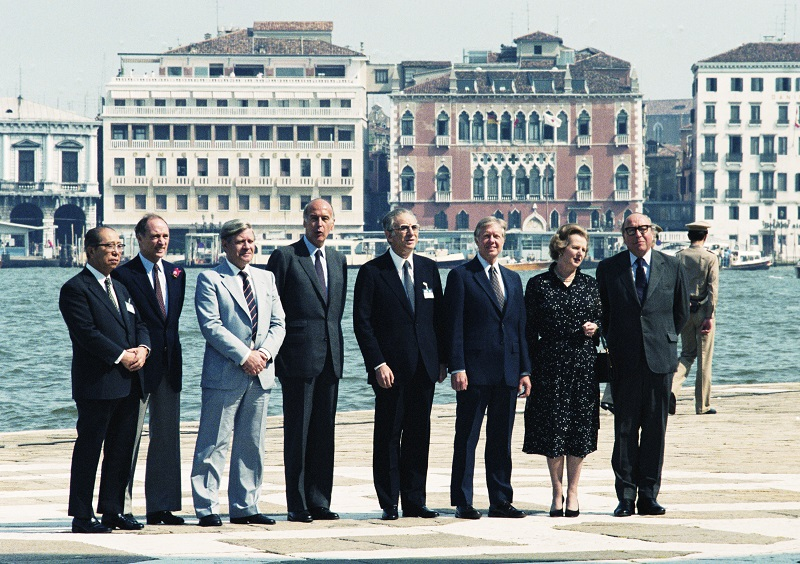
Color pic of G7 attendees with a canal in the background. In attendance were: Japanese minister of foreign affairs Saburo Okita; Canadian prime minister Pierre Trudeau; German chancellor Helmut Schmidt; French president Valery Giscard d’Estaing; Italian prime minister Francesco Cossiga; U.S. president Jimmy Carter; UK prime minister Margaret Thatcher; and European Union Commission president Roy Jenkins.

These summit participants are the current "core members" of the international forum:

Japanese Prime Minister Masayoshi Ōhira had died from a heart attack just days before, and the acting PM was unable to attend.

**Core G7 members** Host state and leader are shown in bold text.
Member		Represented by	Title
(Canada)	Canada	Pierre Trudeau	Prime Minister
(France)	France	Valéry Giscard d'Estaing	President
(West Germany)	West Germany	Helmut Schmidt	Chancellor
(Italy)	**Italy**	**Francesco Cossiga**	**Prime Minister**
(Japan)	Japan	Saburō Ōkita	Minister for Foreign Affairs
(United Kingdom)	United Kingdom	Margaret Thatcher	Prime Minister
(United States)	United States	Jimmy Carter	President
(European Union)	European Commission	Roy Jenkins	Commission President
(European Union)	European Commission	Francesco Cossiga	Council President

== Issues ==
The summit was intended as a venue for resolving differences among its members. As a practical matter, the summit was also conceived as an opportunity for its members to give each other mutual encouragement in the face of difficult economic decisions.

== Gallery of participating leaders ==
=== Core G7 participants ===
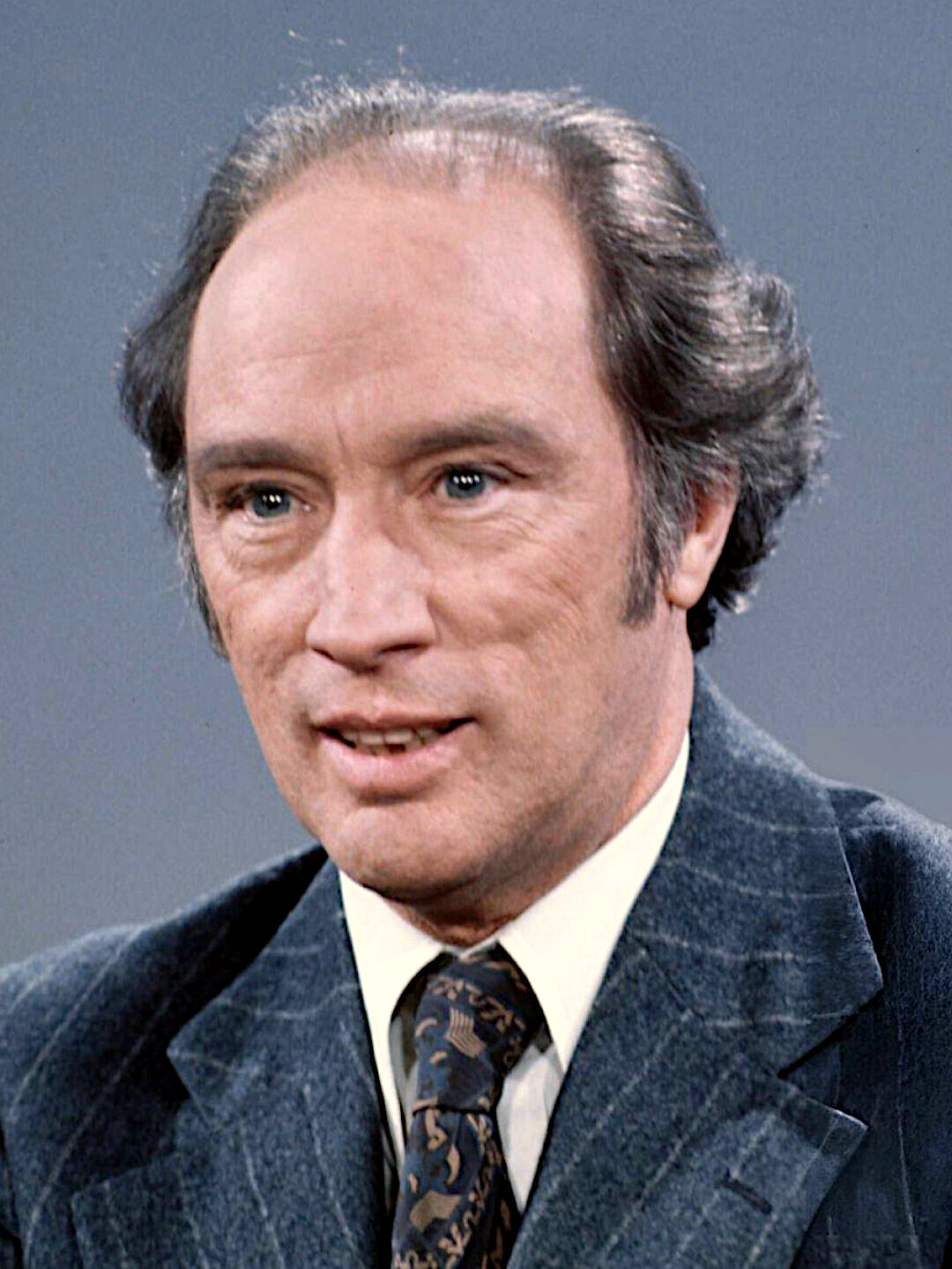
(Canada) Canada
Pierre Trudeau,
Prime Minister

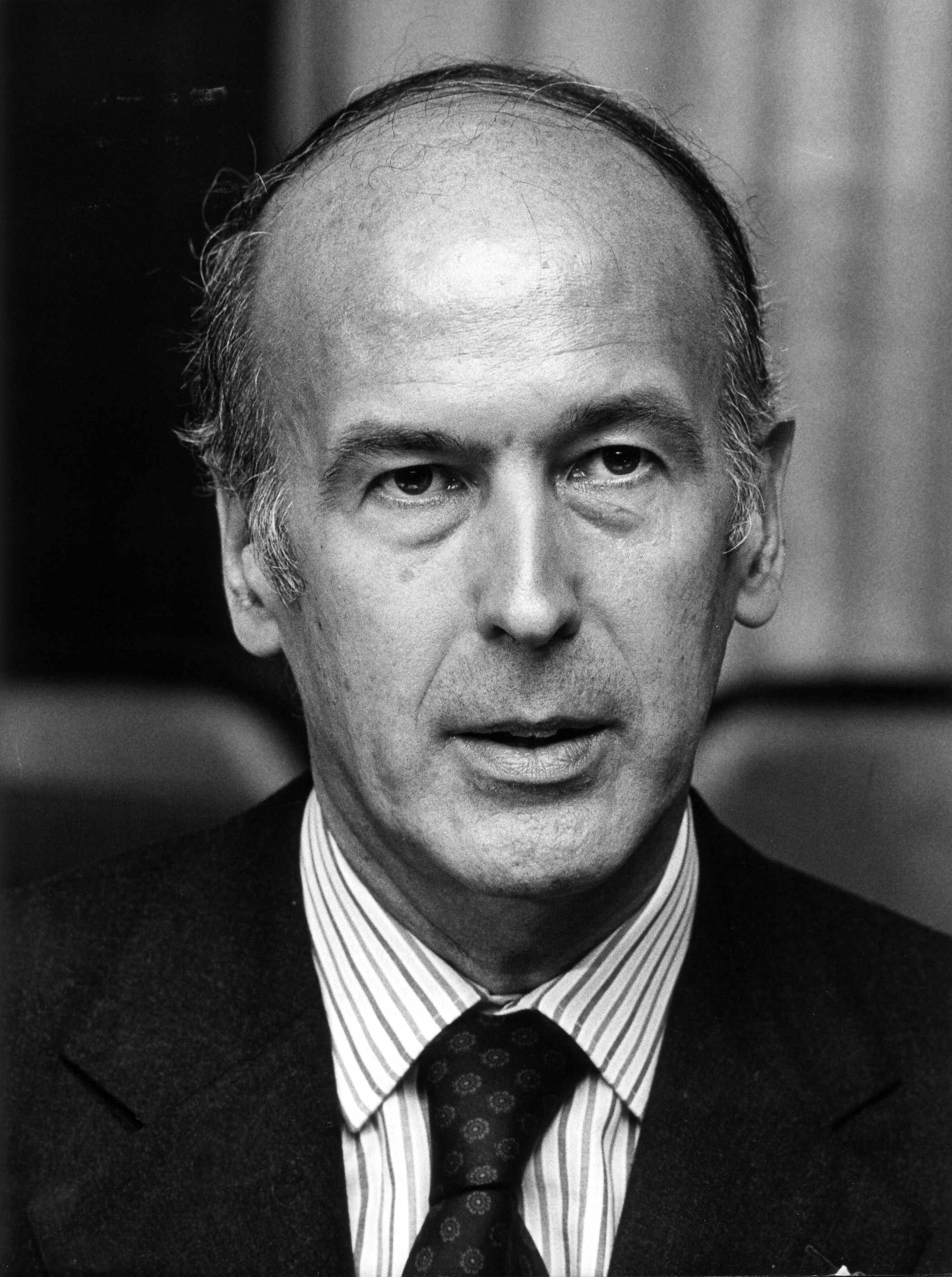
(France) France
Valéry Giscard d'Estaing,
President

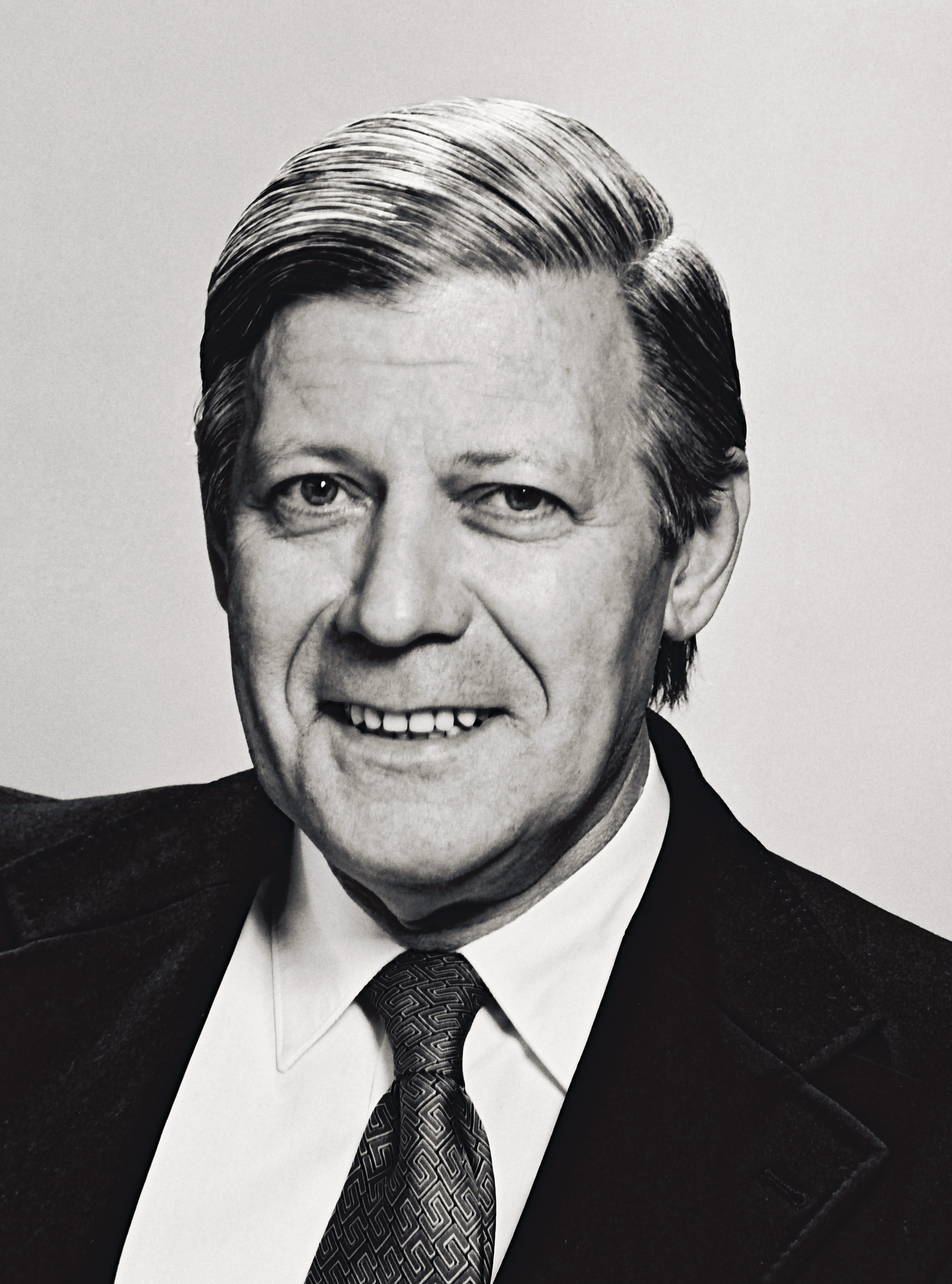
(Germany) Germany
Helmut Schmidt,
Chancellor

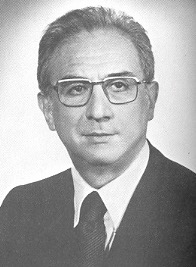
(Italy) Italy
Francesco Cossiga,
Prime Minister (Host)

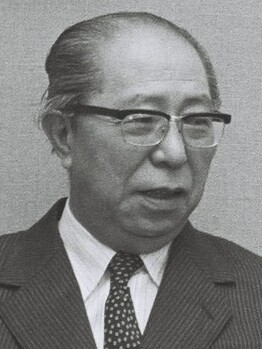
(Japan) Japan
Saburō Ōkita,
Minister for Foreign Affairs

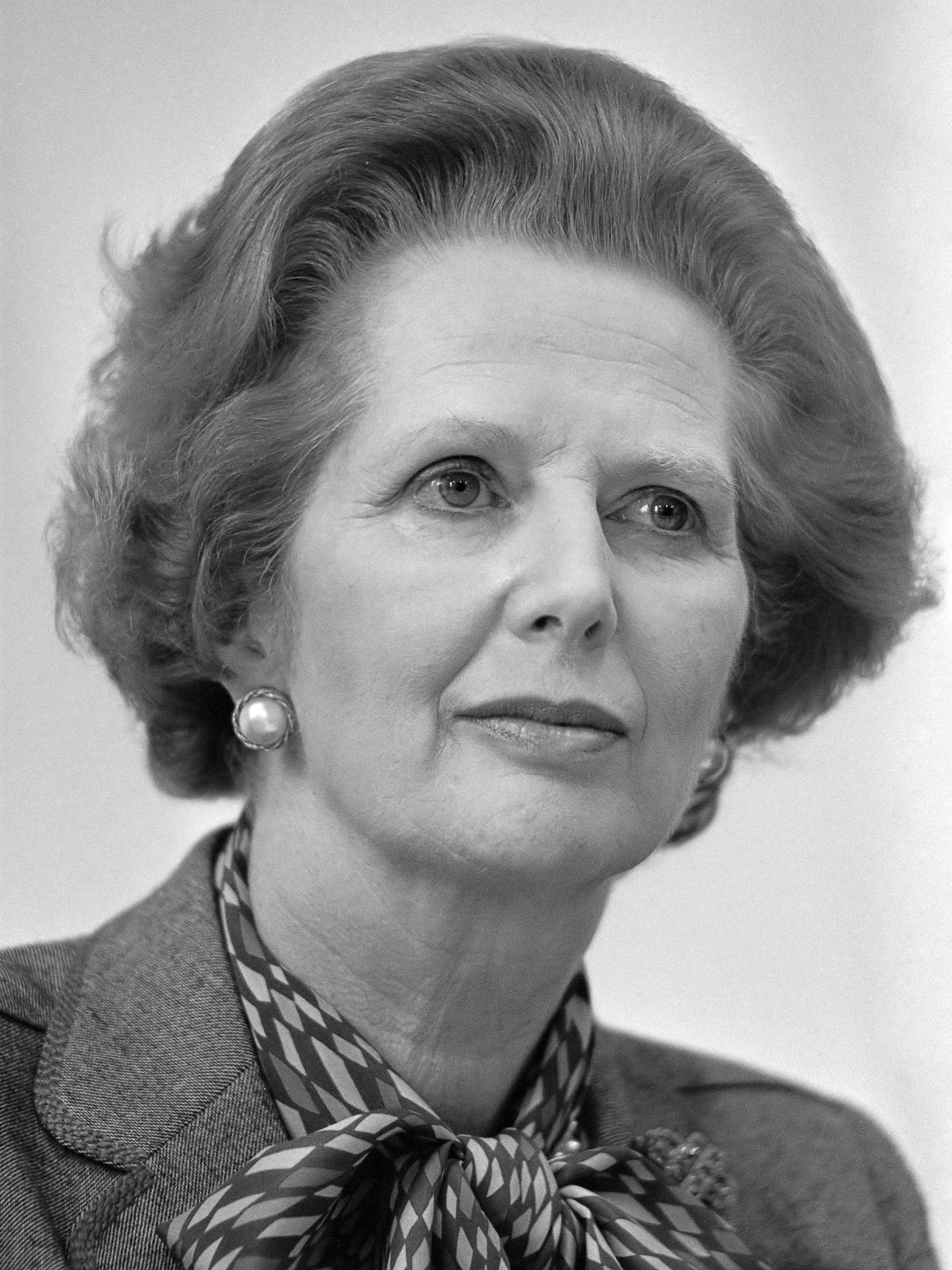
(United Kingdom) United Kingdom
Margaret Thatcher,
Prime Minister

(United States) United States
Jimmy Carter,
President
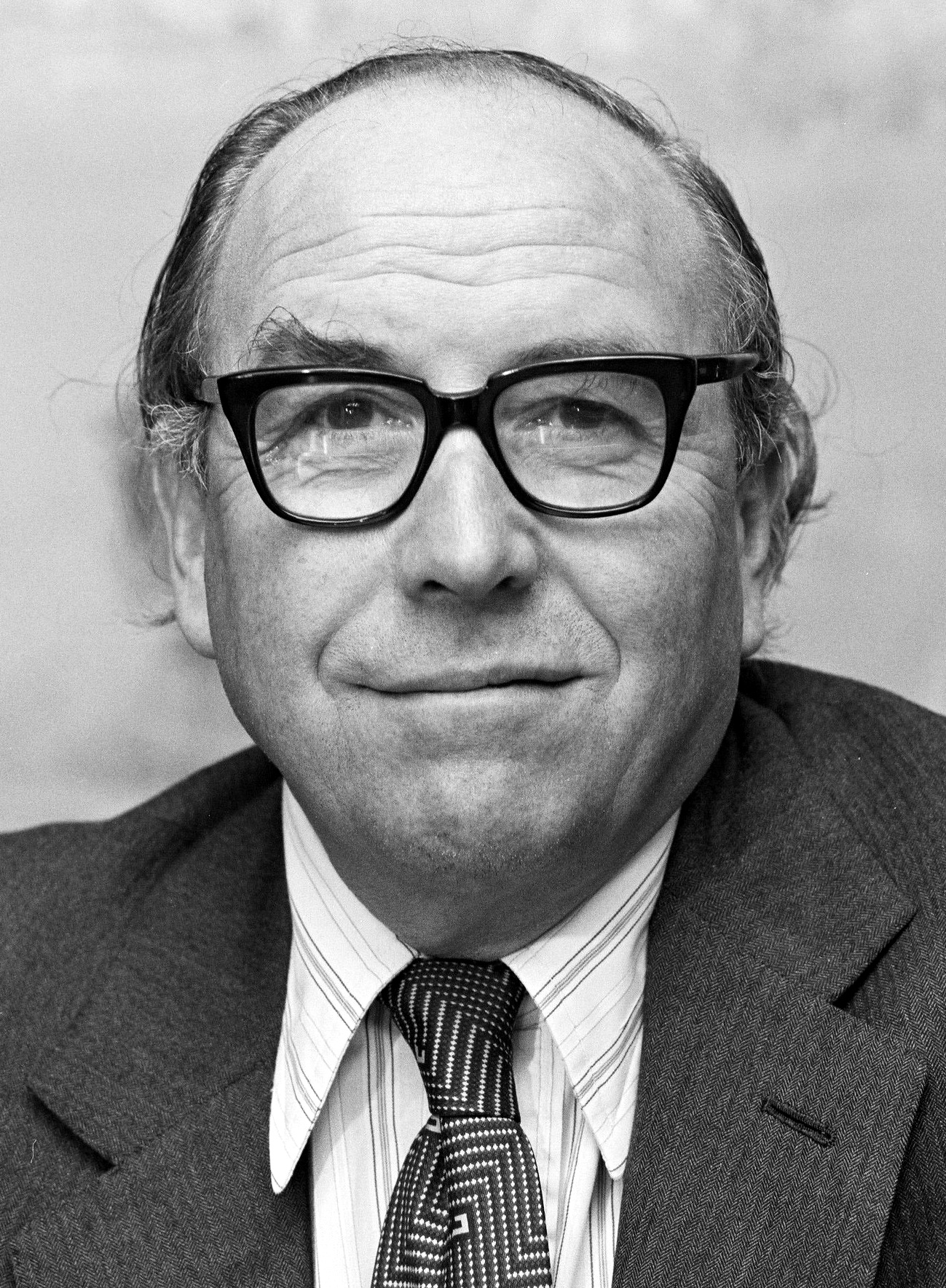
(European Union) European Union
Roy Jenkins,
Commission President

== See also ==
- G8
