= Pacific Basin Economic Council =

Independent business association

The Pacific Basin Economic Council (PBEC)
- Abbreviation: PBEC
- Formation: 1967
- Type: INGO
- Headquarters: Hong Kong SAR
- Location: Wan Chai
- Region served: APAC
- Members: 12,315
- Chairman: Andrew Weir MBE BBS JP INED Standard Chartered Bank HK Ltd, FWD Group & Steward of The Hong Kong Jockey Club
- Vice Chairman: Anna Lin MH JP CEO of GS1 HK
- Vice Chairman: Peter Burnett OBE BBS CEO of CBBC - China Britain Business Council
- Key people: Anson Bailey Treasurer, KPMG Senior Partner, Michael Walsh Executive Director & Sam Chau Deputy Executive Director
- Staff: 3
- Volunteers: 25
- Website: www.pbec.org

The Pacific Basin Economic Council (PBEC) is an independent business association founded by Weldon B. Gibson in 1967 to facilitate business in the Asia-Pacific region. It has a rich history of supporting business leaders, corporations, academics, and Governments across the Asia Pacific. It organizes and hosts roundtable dialogue discussions and key events bi-monthly and annually, as well as provides market intelligence, research papers & policy recommendations on behalf of the APAC business community. It advocates for sustainable, resilient & inclusive economic growth through free trade agreements under a fair international rules-based system that mitigates climate change & supports society. The International Secretariat has been located in Hong Kong since 2003. Michael Walsh has served as its Executive Director since May 2019, bringing extensive global business leadership experience.

== History ==
The Institute of Pacific Relations (IPR) was founded in 1925 as an international forum where national delegations representing a broad range of interests could meet and discuss both domestic and regional issues. The IPR was a respected forum in the period before, during and after World War II, but was disbanded in 1961 after the United States withdrew support. PBEC was one of the organizations that filled the void. It was founded in 1967 by business leaders from the United States, Canada, Australia, New Zealand and Japan. Later the founders were joined by groups of members from other countries in the region such as South Korea, Mexico, Hong Kong, Malaysia and the Philippines.

The purpose of the Pacific Basin Economic Council is to provide high-level engagement between business leaders and Government officials through a regional network of local representatives. Its mission is to create and maintain an environment that facilitates the orderly conduct of sustainable & responsible economic development within & between the 21 APEC Member States. The organization is primarily funded by its patrons, corporate & individual members as well through donors and sponsorship. The organization is informal in the sense that it does not include official government representation and membership is strictly 'by Invitation Only". At the council's 12th general meeting in Los Angeles in 1978 the Pacific Economic Community Plan was proposed, calling for an economic community to coordinate solidarity and cooperation between countries of the region at different stages of development. As of 1993 the PBEC was the main non-government organization involved in economic cooperation in the Pacific region. However, ABAC - APEC's Business Advisory Council, formed by APEC itself, has taken over this primary role, and PBEC now focuses on supporting ABAC initiatives and also PECC - the Pacific Economic Co-operation Council as one of its founding standing committee members, tackling some of the most important economic decisions in Asia.

== Activities ==
The Pacific Basin Economic Council promotes a fair-based regulatory environment for all its members in the region. It advises governments on ways to improve societal issues, the wider business environment and cross-border digital trade barriers. It helps generate direct foreign investment (DFI) interest and encourages new technology development and deployment while avoiding environmental degradation where possible.

The Pacific Basin Economic Council serves as a business organization representing private sector interests in the Asia-Pacific region. It operates as a platform for dialogue and engagement across multiple industries, services, and professional sectors. Over several decades, PBEC has been involved in regional initiatives related to environmental awareness, corporate social responsibility, and governance practices.

PBEC engages in policy advocacy and collaborates with international and regional organizations such as the Asian Development Bank, the Organisation for Economic Co-operation and Development (OECD) Anti-Corruption initiative, the Pacific Economic Cooperation Council (PECC), the Asia-Pacific Economic Cooperation (APEC), Horasis, and the United Nations Global Compact.
