= Wang Keping =

Chinese philosophy professor

- Born: 1955 (age 70–71)
- Other names: Chinese: 王柯平 pinyin: Wáng Kēpíng

Philosophical work
- Era: Contemporary philosophy
- Region: China
- Institutions: Chinese Academy of Social Sciences; Beijing International Studies University
- Main interests: Aesthetics, transcultural studies

Wang Keping is a philosophy professor and PhD supervisor of Beijing International Studies University (BISU), China. He is also Director and doctoral supervisor at the Institute of Philosophy of the Chinese Academy of Social Sciences (CASS). He enjoys the Chinese State Council Special Allowance since 1998 and is currently Vice President of the International Society for Universal Dialogue (ISUD). He has been honorary member of the Olympic Center for Philosophy and Culture under the University of Athens since 2007.

== Awards ==
Wang is a holder of British Academy K. C. Wong Fellowship and his major academic interest is in Aesthetics and Transcultural Studies.

- 2004 — his Towards a Transcultural Aesthetics won the Beijing Book Prize
- 2008 — titled Outstanding Contribution to the Philosophy and Dialogue of Peace at the World Congress of Philosophy, Seoul
- 2010 — Jacobson Award for Outstanding Contribution to the International Philosophical Dialogue
- 2010 — his Diversity and Universality in Aesthetics was elected the annual Yearbook of the International Association for Aesthetics

== Publications ==
As of 2011, his major English works include:

- The Classic of the Dao: A New Investigation. Beijing: Foreign Languages Press, 1998.
- Chinese Philosophy on Life. Beijing: Foreign Languages Press, 2005.
- Ethos of Chinese Culture. Beijing: Foreign Languages Press, 2007.
- Spirit of Chinese Poetics. Beijing: Foreign Languages Press, 2008.
- Chinese Way of Thinking. Shanghai: Brilliant Books, 2009.
- Reading the Dao: A Thematic Inquiry. London: Continuum International Publishing Group, 2011.
