= Pacific Economic Cooperation Council =

Network of member committees composed of individuals and institutions

- Trade name: PECC (1980–present)
- Founded: 1980; 46 years ago
- Headquarters: Singapore

The Pacific Economic Cooperation Council (PECC) is a network of member committees composed of individuals and institutions dedicated to promoting cooperation across the Asia Pacific region, headquartered in Singapore. PECC has 23 full member committees Australia; Brunei Darussalam; Canada; Chile; China; Colombia; Ecuador; Hong Kong; Indonesia; Japan; South Korea; Malaysia; Mexico; Mongolia; New Zealand; Peru; the Philippines; Singapore; Taiwan; Thailand; the United States; Vietnam and the Pacific Islands Forum, one associate member: France (Pacific Territories), and 2 institutional members: the Pacific Trade and Development Conference (PAFTAD) and the Pacific Basin Economic Council (PBEC).

== History ==
The Pacific Economic Cooperation Council (PECC) was founded in 1980 at the initiative of Mr Masayoshi Ohira and Mr Malcolm Fraser, then Prime Ministers of Japan and Australia respectively. Its founding name was the Pacific Economic Cooperation Conference with the final word changed to Council years later. The Council brings together leading thinkers, and decision makers from government and business in an informal setting to discuss and formulate ideas on the most significant challenges facing the Asia Pacific. It regularly develops and advocates regional policy initiatives to aid in the stable economic development of the region.

PECC’s regional community building efforts led to the establishment of the official APEC process in 1989, the Council is one of the three official observers of the APEC process.

Participation in the PECC Process depends on a commitment to economic cooperation in the Pacific. PECC participants, seek to achieve increased, open regional economic cooperation and interaction, while recognizing both the realities of, and the benefits accruing from, global interdependence and continuing to encourage increased economic cooperation and interaction with other nations and regions.

PECC organizes an annual General Meeting to develop strategic perspectives to promote the Pacific Community. Participants in the PECC General Meeting are delegates from PECC member committees and observers.

There is a Standing Committee, the PECC's governing body, which consists of all of the full member committees, and two institutional members and invited associate member committees in a limited capacity. this SC meets once a year.

The Co-chairs are elected for 3-year terms, Dr Charles E. Morrison, President of the East West Center and Mr Jusuf Wanandi, Senior Fellow and Vice-Chair of the Board of Trustees of the Centre for Strategic and International Studies are the current co-chairs.

Task Forces are the primary mechanisms for PECC work program. Each work group is composed of representatives from member committees and, where applicable, other invited institutions and/or individuals.

The PECC International Secretariat is located in Singapore.

Caption

== General meetings ==
- 2023 PECC XXX, Seattle (Hybrid)
- 2022 PECC XXIX, Bangkok (Hybrid)
- 2021 PECC XXVIII, New Zealand (Webinar)
- 2020 PECC XXVII, Kuala Lumpur (Webinar)
- 2019 PECC XXVI, Vina Del Mar
- 2018 PECC XXV, Jakarta
- 2017 PECC XXIV, Hanoi
- 2015 PECC XXIII, Manila, Philippines
- 2014 PECC XXII, Beijing
- 2013 PECC XXI, Vancouver
- 2011 PECC XX, Washington, D.C.,
- 2010 PECC XIX, Tokyo, Japan
- 2009 PECC XVIII, Washington, D.C.
- 2007 PECC XVII, Sydney, Australia
- 2005 PECC XVI, Korea
- 2003 PECC XV, Brunei
- 2001 PECC XIV, Hong Kong
- 1999 PECC XIII, Philippines
- 1997 PECC XII, Chile
- 1995 PECC XI, China
- 1994 PECC X, Malaysia
- 1992 PECC IX USA
- 1991 PECC VIII, Singapore
- 1989 PECC VII, New Zealand
- 1988 PECC VI, Japan
- 1986 PECC V, Canada
- 1985 PECC IV, Korea
- 1983 PECC III, Indonesia
- 1982 PECC II, Thailand
- 1980 PECC I, Australia

PECC’s priority areas for research are decided by its governing body, the Standing Committee composed of the chairs of PECC’s member committees. PECC’s research is freely available on its website: www.pecc.org.

Prior to 2005, the chair of the Standing Committee was the chair of the host of the next General Meeting. In 2005, PECC amended its charter to provide more continuity in its work. Dr Charles Morrison was elected as chair of the Standing Committee. In 2009, the PECC charter was further amended to introduce a co-chair system. The co-chairs are elected by consensus for a period of 3 years and may stand for re-election once. The co-chairs should provide continuity in leadership and should provide leadership for the organization from both sides of the Pacific (Article 3.5.7 of the PECC Charter). At its meeting in Singapore in April 2012, the Standing Committee re-elected Mr Jusuf Wanandi of Indonesia term and elected Ambassador Donald Campbell of Canada as its co-chairs. In 2015, the Standing Committee re-elected Ambassador Campbell for a second term and Ambassador Tang Guoqiang was elected as co-chair, succeeding Mr Wanandi.

== International chairs of PECC ==
- 1980, Sir John Crawford, Australia
- 1980–1982, Dr. Tun Thanat Khoman, Thailand
- 1982–1983, General Ali Moertopo, Indonesia
- 1983–1985, Dr Nam Duck Woo, Korea
- 1985–1986 Mr. Eric Trigg, Canada
- 1986–1988, Dr. Saburo Okita, Japan
- 1988–1989, Rt. Hon. Brian E Talboys, New Zealand
- 1989–1991, Hon. S. Chandra Das, Singapore
- 1991–1993, Ambassador Richard Fairbanks, USA
- 1993–1994, Tan Sri Dato'Dr. Noordin Sopiee, Malaysia
- 1994–1995, Ambassador Yang Chengxu, China
- 1995–1997, Sen. Edgardo Boeninger, Chile
- 1997–1999, Hon. Roberto Romulo, Philippines
- 1999–2001, Dr. William Fung, Hong Kong
- 2001–2003, Pehin Lim Jock Seng, Brunei Darussalam
- 2003–2005, Dr. Kihwan Kim, Korea
- 2005–2008 Dr. Charles E. Morrison, USA
- 2008–2012 Dr. Charles E. Morrison, USA; and Mr Jusuf Wanandi, Indonesia (co-chairs)
- 2012–present Mr Jusuf Wanandi, Indonesia; and Ambassador Donald Campbell (co-chairs)
- 2012–2015 Mr Jusuf Wanandi, Indonesia; and Ambassador Donald Campbell (co-chairs)
- 2015-2018 Ambassador Donald Campbell, Canada and Ambassador Tang Guoqiang, China (co-chairs)
- 2018-2020 Ambassador Donald Campbell, Canada and Ambassador Su Ge, China (co-chairs)
- 2020 – (present) Ambassador Zhan Yongxin, China and Dr Richard Cantor, USA (co-chairs)

== Headquarters ==
PECC’s daily operations are run by an International Secretariat based in Singapore. While PECC was founded in 1980 it did not establish an International Secretariat until 1990. From 1990 till 2005 the head of the International Secretariat was a Director General, from 2005 onwards a Secretary General.

Heads of the PECC International Secretariat

- 1990-1993: Dr Hank Lim (Singapore)
- 1993-1996: Mr David Parsons (Australia)
- 1996-1998: Mr Leung Pak Cheung (Hong Kong)
- 1998-1999: Mr Kenji Tanaka (Acting) (Japan)
- 1999-2002: Dr Mignonne Chan (Taiwan)
- 2002-2003: Mr David Parsons (Australia)
- 2003-2005: Mr Eduardo Pedrosa (Acting) (Philippines)
- 2006–present: Mr Eduardo Pedrosa (Philippines)

== Youth delegation ==
PECC General Meetings are open to the wider public and attended also by youth delegates who have been selected by their respective PECC member committees.

You delegates are expected to boost the knowledge and understanding of current situation of societies and economics in the Asia-Pacific region, through a comprehensive program. Participating in numerous seminars and discussions within the official Youth Program, the selected youth delegates are also involved in all of the General Meetings and Standing Committees. The youth representatives are encouraged to present the discussion report, concerning given topic or agenda to the PECC Standing Committee. Such opportunity provides the youths to experience not only the friendly interaction with the distinguished panels, but also the admission of the youth delegates’ participation in the Standing Committee.

== Youth program reports links ==
- Youth Delegation Report 2010: Food Security

https://web.archive.org/web/20111208041412/http://www.pecc.org/blog/2010/10/30/2010-youth-delegation-report-on-food-security/

- Youth Delegation Report 2011: General Meeting

https://web.archive.org/web/20120309045344/http://www.pecc.org/blog/2011/10/31/2011-youth-delegates-report-on-pecc-20th-general-meeting/

== Recent conference ==
21st PECC General Meeting | Vancouver, Canada | June 3-5, 2013

The 21st General Meeting of PECC (PECC XXI) was hosted by CANCPEC (Canada committee) in Vancouver on June 3–5, 2013. It was held in conjunction with Canada-Asia 2013 and organized by the Asia Pacific Foundation of Canada.

The opening plenary session, 'Key Trends Shaping the Asia-Pacific" examined the latest economic, political, and social trends in the Asia-Pacific, identifying the emerging opportunities and uncertainties in the region. Will slower economic growth be the norm in Asia over the next few years and how will this affect both the regional and global economy? What will be the impact of a rapidly growing urban population—particularly one with an increasing middle class with evolving needs and expectations? Given the two on-going regional trade negotiations, what will be the future of trade in the Asia Pacific?

The opening plenary session was followed by concurrent breakout sessions which covered diverse topics including: infrastructure deficit in the Asia-Pacific, creativity and innovation in Asia, promoting inclusive growth and resilient societies in Asia, green growth, and risks to growth in the Asia-Pacific.

Later plenary sessions covered Canada's Asia strategy and how economies are responding to the rise of Asia. Thereafter, breakout sessions addressed Canada's contribution to sustainable growth in the Asia-Pacific, and preparation of Canada's next generation to compete in an international environment increasingly influenced by developments in Asia.

The last time PECC GM was held in Vancouver was in November 1986 when Mr. Eric Trigg served as the International Chair of PECC. PECC General Meetings are open to the wider public and attended also by youth delegates who have been selected by their respective PECC member committees.

== See also ==
- Asia-Pacific Economic Cooperation
- Asia–Pacific
