= Xi Jinping Thought on Diplomacy Studies Center =

Chinese government research institute

- 习近平外交思想研究中心
- Formation: July 20, 2020; 5 years ago
- Type: Research Center
- Headquarters: Beijing
- Parent organization: China Institute of International Studies

The Xi Jinping Thought on Diplomacy Studies Center is a research institute affiliated to the China Institute of International Studies. The center was established on July 20, 2020, by the Ministry of Foreign Affairs in support of the CIIS.

== History ==
On July 20, 2020, the Xi Jinping Diplomatic Thought Research Center was established in Beijing. State Councilor and Foreign Minister Wang Yi attended the inauguration ceremony and delivered a speech. In his speech, Wang Yi praised "General Secretary Xi Jinping for his great strategic vision and for accurately grasping the laws of human social development and comprehensively judging the direction of the international situation and China's historical position."

== Activities ==
Its purpose is to "coordinate national research resources, comprehensively, systematically and in-depth carry out research, interpretation and promotion of Xi Jinping Thought on Diplomacy, conduct original, theoretical, practical, dissemination, policy and thematic research on Xi Jinping Thought on Diplomacy, give full play to the guiding role of Xi Jinping Thought on Diplomacy in diplomatic practice, serve the theoretical construction, institutional mechanism construction and capacity building of China's new era of major-country diplomacy, and make positive contributions to the creation of China's new era of diplomacy with Chinese characteristics."
