= Gai Zhixin =

Chinese businessman

- Chinese: 盖志新
- Hanyu Pinyin: Gài Zhìxīn
Transcriptions
Standard Mandarin
- Hanyu Pinyin: Gài Zhìxīn

Gai Zhixin (Chinese: 盖志新; pinyin: Gài Zhìxīn) is Board Chairman and Party Secretary of China International Travel Corp Limited, Board Chairman and General Manager of the CITS Group Corporation, and Chairman of China Association of Travel Service (CATS). He was President and General Manager of China Duty-Free Goods Group Company. He is also a member of the Steering Committee of the China-United States Exchange Foundation, Honorary Advisor of the Global Tourism Economy Forum.
