= CITS Group Corporation =

Chinese leisure and tourism corporation

CITS Group Corporation 中国国旅集团有限公司

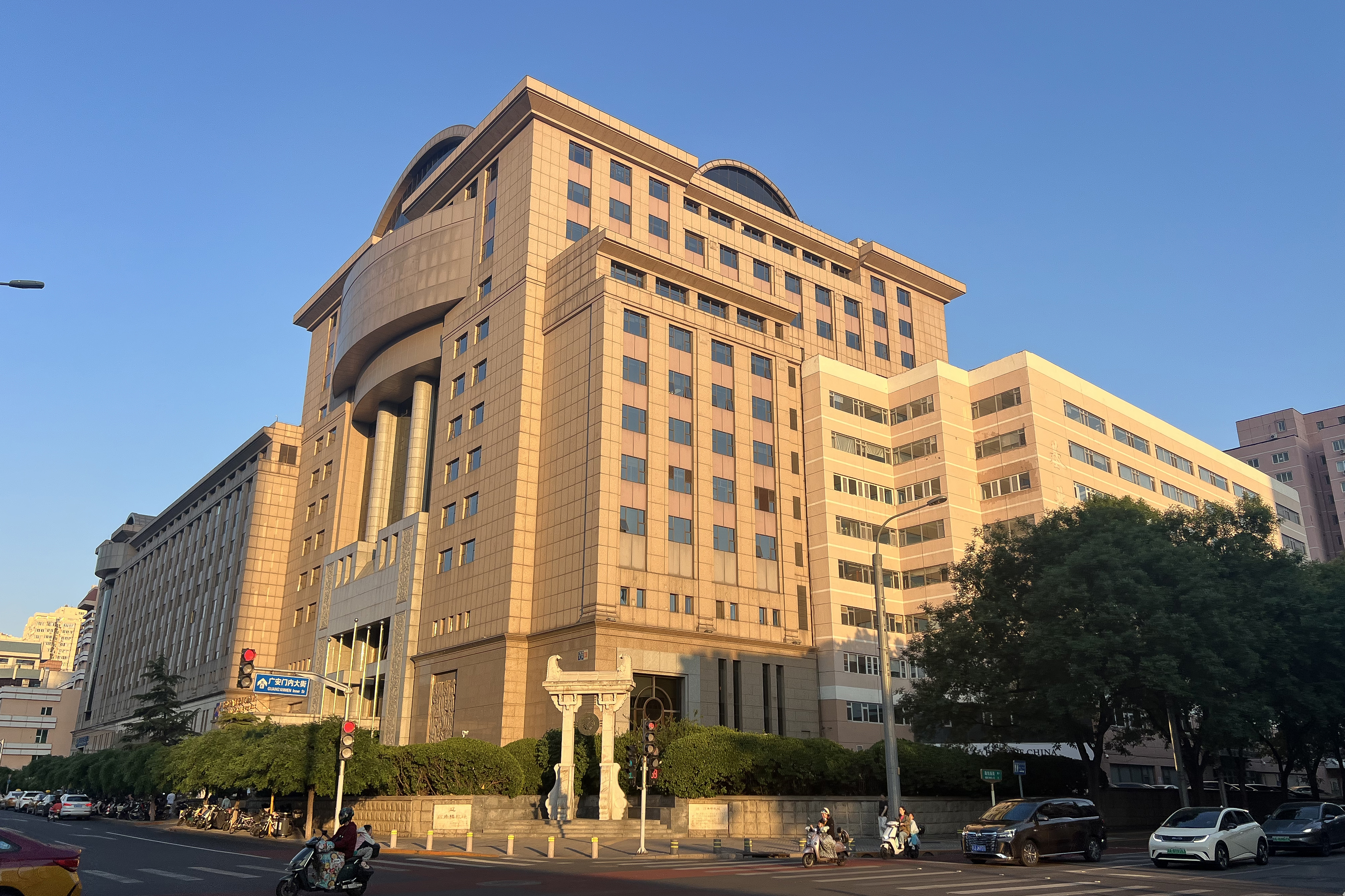
- Headquarters in Beijing at Grand Metropark Hotel Beijing Guanganmen
- Native name: pinyin: Zhōngguó Guólǚ Jítuán Yǒuxiàn Gōngsī
- Type: State-owned enterprise
- Traded as: CSI A50 (China Tourism Group Duty Free Corporation Limited)
- Industry: Tourism; Leisure
- Founded: April 15, 1954 (as the China International Travel Service); December 19, 2003 (as CITS Group Corporation)
- Headquarters: Peking, People's Republic of China
- Area served: Worldwide
- Key people: Gai Zhixin (Chairman and GM)
- Services: Travel services; Duty-free trade; Real estate development and management; Communications and transport; E-commerce
- Owner: Chinese Central Government
- Website: www.citsgroup.com.cn(in Chinese)

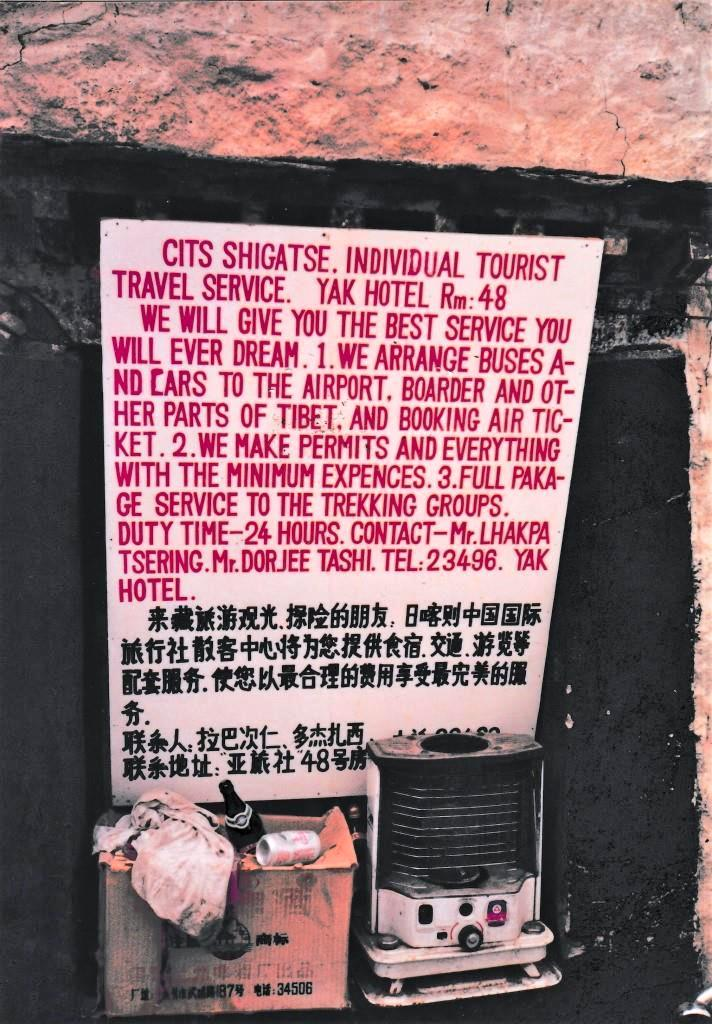
CITS. We will give you the best service you will ever dream. Shigatse, Tibet

The CITS Group Corporation (Chinese: 中国国旅集团有限公司; pinyin: Zhōngguó Guólǚ Jítuán Yǒuxiàn Gōngsī) is a state-owned leisure and tourism corporation based in Beijing, China. With registered capital of CN¥390 million, the group is one of the largest Chinese tourism enterprises. It is primarily engaged in travel services, duty-free trade and real estate development and management. Among its major subsidiaries include CITS Head Office, China Duty Free Group, CITS Real Estates, etc. The group is also the holding company of CITS Corporation Ltd, a domestically listed joint-stock corporation (SSE: 601888).

== History ==
China International Travel Service (CITS) was established as a state-owned enterprise in 1954. "International" in this context referred to diplomacy.CITS was significant in the China's tourism sector and as mechanism for public diplomacy from the middle 1950s through the late 1970s. CITS handled inbound tourism work for self-funded tourists and state-invited guests.

Early in its history, CITS established tourism agreements with the Soviet Union's Intourist.

CITS sent a delegation to the first conference of travel agencies of the socialist countries, which was held in Prague in October 1957.

In 1958, CITS entered into agreements on tourism exchanges with state tourism bodies in Mongolia, East Germany, Poland, Romania, and Hungary.

During the Sino-Soviet split, CITS lost what had been its biggest customer base.`

In 1964, the State Council established the Travel and Sightseeing Affairs Administration (which was placed in the supervision of the Ministry of Foreign Affairs) to oversee CITS. Academic Gavin Healy writes that this change signaled that CITS "was moving away from economic planning and more squarely toward the realm of diplomatic policy."
