= Li Yueran =

Chinese translator

- Li Yueran, died 76
- Died: 2003 (aged 75–76); Beijing
- Other names: Chinese: 李越然 pinyin: Lǐ Yuèrán
- Awards: China-Russia relations awards

Li Yueran (1927 – 11 July 2003) was chief Russian-language interpreter and translator of the Central Committee of the Chinese Communist Party. From August 1949 to May 1965, Li served successively as translator for Mao Zedong, Liu Shaoqi, Zhou Enlai, Deng Xiaoping, Chen Yun, Peng Zhen, Chen Yi, Bo Yibo and Li Fuchun, and in 2001 he published his memoirs A Record of the Personal Experiences of the Sino-Soviet Diplomacy (Beijing: World Knowledge Publishing House). He joined Beijing International Studies University as professor of Russian Studies in 1965, and later served as vice president.

Li received the 50th anniversary memorial medal from the then Russian president Boris Yeltsin as a token of gratefulness to his outstanding contribution to the cultural and diplomatic relations between China and Russia (and the historical Soviet Union). The China-Russia Association for Friendship and the Russia-China Association for Friendship also bestowed him awards as recognition to his efforts in promoting China-Russia friendship. In 2001, Li was one of the first senior translators bestowed Lifetime Achievement Award in Translation by the Translators Association of China.
