= Liu Chunxian =

Major General Liu Chunxian
- 刘春先
- Born: 1946 (age 79–80); Wei County, Hebei
- Military career
- Branch: Military intelligence, General Staff Department, People's Liberation Army
- Service years: 1972-present

Liu Chunxian is a Major General of the People's Republic of China, serving in the General Staff Department of the People's Liberation Army.

Born in 1946, he is a native of Wei County in Hebei Province. He was admitted to the Department of German and Japanese Studies of Beijing Second Foreign Languages Institute in 1965. During his study, Liu was elected delegate of the 9th CPC National Congress in 1969. After graduation, he stayed at the university for further study until December 1972, when he was assigned to the PLA General Staff Department. He served successively as staff officer, division head, deputy director and Director General in the military. In 2003, he was elected member of the 10th CPPCC Shanghai Municipal Committee.
