= Yang Chengxu =

Chinese diplomat

- 杨成绪

Chair, PECC China
- In office 1995 – September 2005
- Preceded by: Li Luye
- Succeeded by: Mei Ping

President, China Institute of International Studies
- In office May 1993 – November 2001
- Preceded by: Du Gong
- Succeeded by: Song Mingjiang

Chinese Ambassador to Austria
- In office November 1985 – October 1989
- Preceded by: Wang Shu
- Succeeded by: Hu Benyao

Personal details
- Born: 1930 (age 95–96) Qingdao, Shandong
- Education: Fudan University; Xinhua Foreign Languages Institute

Yang Chengxu is a senior Chinese diplomat to German-speaking countries.

He was born in Qingdao in 1930 and later moved to Shanghai with his family. In 1952, he received his bachelor's degree in German Literature from Fudan University and started to work for the All-China Journalists Association. In 1962, Yang was sent to the Xinhua News Agency-founded Foreign Languages Institute to take advanced training courses. In 1973, he joined the Chinese Foreign Ministry and served successively as Secretary, Counsellor and Minister-Counsellor in Chinese Embassies in Federal Republic of Germany and German Democratic Republic.

In 1985, he was appointed Chinese Ambassador to Austria and was succeeded by Hu Benyao in 1989. He was then appointed director of the Department of Policy Planning and deputy director of the Department of West European Affairs of the Foreign Ministry.

From May 1993, he succeeded Du Gong as President of the China Institute of International Studies and was relieved from the position in November 2001. He also chaired PECC China, the China National Committee for Pacific Economic Cooperation (CNCPEC) from 1995 to 2005.
