= Kym Anderson =

Australian economist (born 1950)

Kym Anderson AC (born 26 February 1950 in Adelaide) is an Australian economist, specialising in trade policy and issues related to the World Trade Organization, as well as the economics of agriculture, food and wine. He studied at the University of New England, the University of Adelaide and the University of Chicago before completing a PhD at Stanford University. He held a Personal Chair in the School of Economics and was Foundation Executive Director of the Centre for International Economic Studies at the University of Adelaide, before becoming the George Gollin Professsor of Economics there in 2007 and then George Gollin Professsor Emeritus of Economics in 2018. He is also an Honorary Professor of Economics at the Australian National University’s Crawford School of Public Policy (where he was a Research Fellow in 1977-83 and a part-time Professor of Economics in 2012-18). In 2010 he formed the University of Adelaide’s Wine Economics Research Centre and continues to be its Executive Director. He has published around 40 books and more than 300 journal articles and chapters in other books.

== Career ==
Anderson was elected a Fellow of the Academy of the Social Sciences in Australia in 1994, a Distinguished Fellow (and former president) of the Australasian Agricultural and Resource Economics Society in 2002, a Fellow of the (American) Agricultural and Applied Economics Association in 2004, a Fellow (and Vice-President) of the American Association of Wine Economists in 2009, an Honorary Life Member of the International Association of Agricultural Economists in 2018, and a Distinguished Fellow of the Economic Society of Australia in 2019. He has been a Research Fellow of Europe's London-based Centre for Economic Policy Research since 1992.

He has taught as a guest professor at the Australian Defence College, Australian National University, Peking University, the University of Siena, the University of Sydney, Uppsala University, The World Trade Institute at the Swiss universities of Bern, Fribourg and Neuchatel (Master of International Law and Economics), and Georgetown University's Law School (JD and LLM programs in international economic law). He has conducted many short courses on agricultural and trade policy issues and WTO matters in numerous developing countries including China since 1995.

Anderson has spent periods of leave at Korea's International Economics Institute (1979), Korea's Rural Economics Institute (1980-81 as Ford Foundation Visiting Fellow in International Economics), the Australian Department of Trade (1983), Stockholm University's Institute for International Economic Studies (1988), the GATT (now WTO) Secretariat in Geneva (1990–92) as deputy to the Director of Economic Research and Analysis, and the Research Group of the World Bank in Washington DC (2004–07) as Lead Economist (Trade Policy).

== Publications ==
His dozen most-cited books (according to Google Scholar) are:

The Political Economy of Agricultural Protection: East Asia in International Perspective (with Y. Hayami and others), Boston, London and Sydney: Allen and Unwin, 1986.

Distortions to Agricultural Incentives: A Global Perspective, 1955 -2007 (editor), London and New York: Palgrave Macmillan, 2009.

Disarray in World Food Markets: A Quantitative Assessment (with R. Tyers), Cambridge and New York: Cambridge University Press, 1992.

The Greening of World Trade Issues (edited with R. Blackhurst), London: Harvester Wheatsheaf and Ann Arbor: University of Michigan Press, 1992.

Global Wine Markets, 1860 to 2016: A Statistical Compendium (with S. Nelgen and V. Pinilla), Adelaide: University of Adelaide Press, 2017, a revision and update of Global Wine Markets, 1961 to 2009: A Statistical Compendium, (with S. Nelgen), University of Adelaide Press, 2011.

The World’s Wine Markets: Globalization at Work (editor), Cheltenham: Edward Elgar, 2004.

Regional Integration and the Global Trading System (edited with R. Blackhurst), London: Harvester Wheatsheaf and New York: St. Martins Press, 1993.

Which Winegrape Varieties are Grown Where? A Global Empirical Picture (Revised Edition) (with S. Nelgen), Adelaide: University of Adelaide Press, 2020, a revision and update of Which Winegrape Varieties are Grown Where? A Global Empirical Picture (with the assistance of N.R. Aryal), Adelaide: University of Adelaide Press, 2013.

Australian Protectionism: Extent, Causes and Effects (with R. Garnaut), Boston, London and Sydney: Allen and Unwin, 1987.

Wine Globalization: A New Comparative History (edited with V. Pinilla), Cambridge and New York: Cambridge University Press, 2018.

The Political Economy of Agricultural Price Distortions (editor), Cambridge and New York: Cambridge University Press, 2010.

Agricultural Price Distortions, Inequality and Poverty (edited with J. Cockburn and W. Martin), Washington DC: World Bank, 2010.
