= Yue Xiaodong =

Yue Xiaodong is associate professor of psychology at the City University of Hong Kong, and adjunct professor of c. 20 universities in mainland China. He is an affiliated Registered Psychologist in Counseling to the Hong Kong Psychology Society (HKPS), the International Society for Humor Studies (ISHS) and the Association of Applied And Therapeutic Humor (AATH), as well as column writer for Beijing Youth Daily and Health Daily.

He was admitted to the major of English language and literature at Beijing Second Foreign Languages Institute of China in 1977 and received his Bachelor of Arts degree in 1982. He lectured at the university upon graduation and went for education studies at Tufts University in United States from 1985 to 1987. Since obtaining his Ed.D. in human development and psychology from Harvard University in August 1993, he has been teaching psychology and education courses in Hong Kong. He first taught at the Chinese University of Hong Kong, and later joined the City University of Hong Kong faculty as assistant professor.

Yue taught the first positive psychology course in Hong Kong universities in 2007. In 2010, he chaired the 22nd ISHS Conference held in Hong Kong.
