= Shuyu (disambiguation) =

Shuyu is an extinct genus of early jawless vertebrate from the Early or Middle Silurian.

Shuyu or Shu Yu may also refer to:

- Chinese given names:
  - Táng Shū Yú (唐叔虞; fl. 1042 BCE), founder of the Tang state
  - Liang Zhan (Shuyu) (梁鱣 (叔魚); fl. 500s BCE), a disciple of Confucius
  - Yu Yi (Shuyu) (庾懌 (叔預); 293–342), a Jin dynasty consort kin, general and official
  - Wei Shuyu (韋叔裕; 509–580), aka Wei Xiaokuan, Duke Xiang of Xun, a general of the Xianbei-led Western Wei and Northern Zhou dynasties
  - Féng Shūyú (冯叔瑜; 1924–2025), a Chinese engineer
  - Tom Lin Shu-yu (林書宇; born 1976), a Taiwanese film director and screenwriter
  - Yáng Shūyǔ (杨舒予; born 2002), a Chinese basketball player
- shúyǔ (熟语; 熟語) an idiomatic expression in Chinese
- shuyu (書寓), the highest class of sing-song girls
