= China Institute of International Studies =

Chinese policy research organization

- Formation: 1956; 70 years ago
- Type: Think tank, institute
- Purpose: Foreign policies, global affairs, geopolitics
- Location: China
- President: List of CIIS Presidents: 1956-1966: Meng Yongqian; 1966-1980: (Note: Yao's name appears in the introduction in English but is omitted from the Chinese webpage.) Yao Zhongming; 1980-1983: Li Huichuan; 1983-1986: Zheng Weizhi; 1986-1990: Wang Shu; 1990-1993: Du Gong; 1993-2001: Yang Chengxu; 2001-2004: Song Mingjiang; 2004-2010: Ma Zhengang; 2010-present: Su Ge
- Affiliations: Ministry of Foreign Affairs of the People's Republic of China
- Staff: c. 100
- Website: www.ciis.org.cn
- Formerly called: Institute of International Relations of the Chinese Academy of Sciences (1956-1958); Institute of International Relations (1958-1986)

CIIS, or the China Institute of International Studies (Chinese: 中国国际问题研究所; pinyin: Zhōngguó Guójì Wèntí Yánjiūsuǒ) is a research institute directly administered by the Ministry of Foreign Affairs of the People's Republic of China. The Institute primarily focuses on issues associated with global politics and economics.

The institute was founded in 1956 as the Institute of International Relations of the Chinese Academy of Sciences. It was renamed Institute of International Relations in 1958, and assumed its present name in December 1986. In 1998, the China Center for International Affairs, formerly a research institution of China's State Council, was incorporated with CIIS.

== History ==
At the proposal of Zhang Wentian, Executive Vice Minister of Foreign Affairs, and with the approval of the State Council, the Institute of International Relations of the Chinese Academy of Sciences was established on November 24, 1956. It was the first institution in Chinese history dedicated specifically to the study of international issues. In 1958, it was separated from the Chinese Academy of Sciences and renamed the Institute of International Relations. During the Sino-Soviet split, the Institute took part in drafting the polemical document "The Nine Commentaries on the Open Letter of the Central Committee of the CPSU." The institute was dissolved during the Cultural Revolution.

In 1973, following the breakthrough in China–United States relations after President Richard Nixon's 1972 visit to China, Premier Zhou Enlai instructed that the Institute be re-established to meet the needs of China's diplomatic work. The reconstituted institution was named the Institute of International Studies. In January 1973, the Ministry of Foreign Affairs decided to restore the Institute and assigned Zhang Mingyang and four others to form a preparatory group. In 1977, this preparatory group was reorganized into a leadership team. In 1979, the Ministry of Foreign Affairs formally defined the institute's mission as conducting medium- and long-term, strategic, and policy-oriented research. In 1986, it was renamed the China Institute of International Studies (CIIS).

In 1998, during the State Council's institutional restructuring, the former State Council Research Center for International Problems was merged into the institute. The China Foundation for International Studies and Academic Exchanges, previously affiliated with the Research Center, was also placed under the institute, together with three other affiliated bodies: the National Committee for Pacific Economic Cooperation, the Council for Security Cooperation in the Asia Pacific (China Committee), and the later-established China Arms Control and Disarmament Association.

In June 2014, the Office of the Central Institutional Organization Commission approved the renaming of the Institute as the China Institute of International Studies (CIIS) at the academy level. The renaming ceremony was held on 29 July 2014, where Zhang Yesui, Party Secretary of the Ministry of Foreign Affairs, announced the decision, and State Councilor Yang Jiechi unveiled the plaque for the newly named China Institute of International Studies.

== Organization ==
The Institute researchers are mainly composed of senior diplomats and prominent scholars. There are also young graduates of IR backgrounds from advanced universities. The presidency is held by former Chinese Ambassadors; the incumbent president is Su Ge.

The organization comprises eight departments and four affiliate bodies:

Departments

- Department of Global Strategy
- Department of Information and Contingencies Analysis
- Department of American Studies
- Department of Asia-Pacific Security and Cooperation
- Department of EU Studies
- Department of Developing Countries Studies
- Department of Shanghai Cooperation Organisation Studies
- Department of World Economy and Development Studies

Affiliates

- China National Commission for Pacific Economic Cooperation
- China Commission of the Council for Security Cooperation in the Asia Pacific
- China International Studies and Academic Exchange Foundation
- China Arms Control and Disarmament Association

It also houses Research Centers on the study of European Union, the Middle East, the South Pacific, China's Energy Strategy, Periphery Security and World Economy and Security. In addition, the Institute runs the International Affairs Office, which is responsible for overseeing international liaisons, and an editorial office for the publication of the Chinese and English version of the bi-monthly journal International Studies, whose contributors include CIIS researchers and independent foreign affairs experts. In July 2020, the Xi Jinping Thought on Diplomacy Studies Center opened at CIIS.
