= International Society for Universal Dialogue =

The International Society for Universal Dialogue is a philosophical society whose purpose is to promote discussions of human rights, world peace, and preservation of the environment.
