= Saburo Okita =

Japanese economist and politician

Saburō Ōkita
- 大来 佐武郎
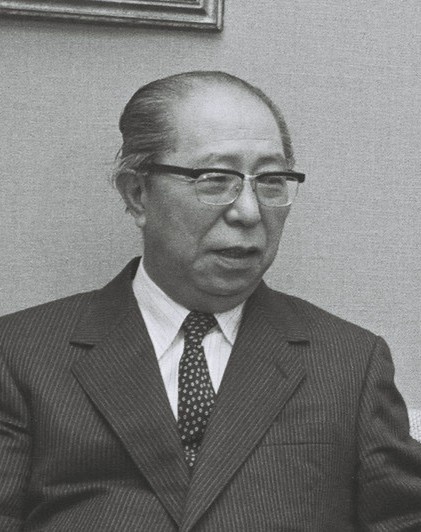
- Okita in 1980

Minister for Foreign Affairs
- In office 8 November 1979 – 17 July 1980
- Prime Minister: Masayoshi Ōhira; Masayoshi Itō (acting)
- Preceded by: Sunao Sonoda
- Succeeded by: Masayoshi Itō

Personal details
- Born: 3 November 1914 Dalian, Kwantung Leased Territory, Empire of Japan
- Died: 9 February 1993 (aged 78) Tokyo, Japan
- Party: Independent
- Other political affiliations: New Liberal Club
- Education: Nagoya University (PhD); Tokyo Imperial University (B.A.)

Saburō Ōkita (大来 佐武郎 Ōkita Saburō) (3 November 1914 – 9 February 1993) was a Japanese economist and politician noted for his role in the postwar development of the Japanese economy and Japan-US relations.

== Early life and education ==
Ōkita was born in Dalian, Kwantung Leased Territory on 3 November 1914. He graduated from Tokyo Imperial University, and later earned a PhD from Nagoya University in 1962.

== Career ==
In 1937, Ōkita worked as an engineer with the Ministry of Posts. Later on he held numerous government positions, including chief of research for the Economic Stabilization Board in 1947, chief of the economic cooperation unit for the Economic Planning Agency in 1953 and later director general of their planning bureau in 1957, and then in 1963 the director general of the EPA development bureau. In each of these positions, he played an important role under the economic plan of then prime minister Hayato Ikeda, which greatly helped Japan's postwar economy. In his EPA role, he became known for his central role in the Income Doubling Plan, which presaged Japan's rapid postwar industrial development.

In 1964, Ōkita became the president of the Japan Center for Economic Research, and later served as its chairman from 1973 to 1979.

From 1979 to 1980 he served as the Foreign Minister, and continued to be one of Japan's foremost academic spokesmen. He was the only academic to serve in this normally political role, and was noted for shifting away from bilateralism toward multilateralism, as well as strengthening Japan's role in international diplomacy and disputes.

In the late 1970s, Ōkita became one of the first international advisor's to the People's Republic of China's State Council.

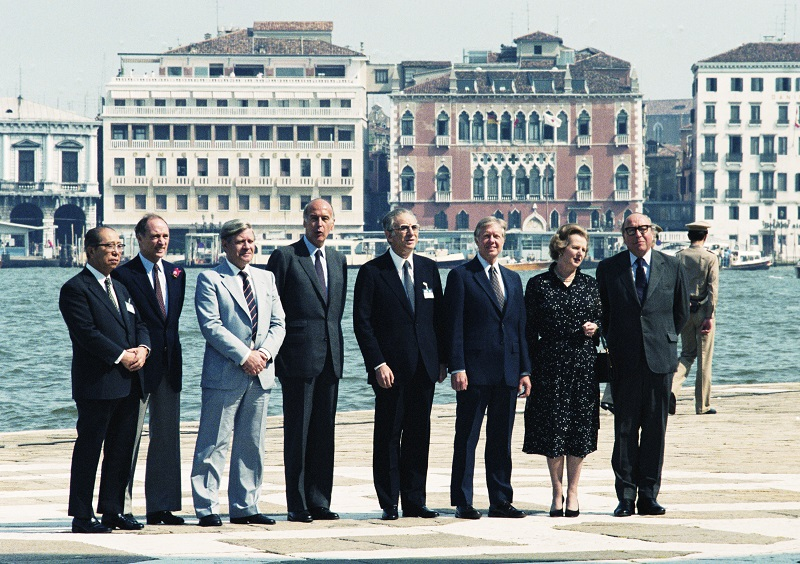
Okita (far left) at the 1980 G7 summit in Venice, Italy

Due to the sudden death of Prime Minister Masayoshi Ōhira in 1980, Okita represented Japan at the 6th G7 summit in Venice, Italy.

He subsequently held other positions including President Of International University of Japan and as an advisor to the ministry of foreign affairs in 1982, and in 1989, as chairman of the Institute for Domestic and Policy Studies in Tokyo. He served as the international chair of the Pacific Economic Cooperation Council from 1986 to 1988.

In 1986, Okita proposed a Japanese version of the Marshall Plan to support developing countries using Japan's internationally criticized trade surplus.

Days prior to his death in 1993, he wrote a paper directed at the Clinton administration which pointed out that Asian countries were becoming less reliant on trade with the United States and more reliant upon trade with each other, expressing a hope that "the United States will support greater networking within Asia, and will cooperate with Asia as a whole rather than only with individual Asian countries." He died of a heart attack while discussing US-Japan economic cooperation on a phone call with economist C. Fred Bergsten.

== Awards ==
He received the Ramon Magsaysay Award in 1971 for International Understanding. In 1985 he became a Companion of the Order of Australia, and in 1986 was made a Grand Cordon of the Order of the Rising Sun. He was also awarded the Indira Gandhi Prize in 1992.

== Works ==
- The Future of Japan's Economy (1960)
- Economic Planning (1962)
- Future Vision for the Japanese Economy (1968)
- Japan and the World Economy (1975)
- Developing Economics and Japan: Lessons in Growth (1980)
- Japan's Challenging Years: Reflections on My Lifetime (1983)

Political offices
Preceded by Sunao Sonoda	Minister for Foreign Affairs of Japan; 1979–1980	Succeeded by Masayoshi Itō
