= Advanced Institute for Confucian Studies, Shandong University =

Institute of Shandong University, China

The Advanced Institute for Confucian Studies, Shandong University (山东大学儒学高等研究院) is an academic and research institution devoted to the study of Confucian philosophy, East Asian intellectual history, and classical Chinese civilization. The institute promotes interdisciplinary scholarship on Confucian traditions and their contemporary relevance through research programs, publications, public lectures, and international academic exchange.

== History ==
The Advanced Institute for Confucian Studies at Shandong University was established in April 2010. In January 2012, the university integrated the original Advanced Institute for Confucian Studies, the Center for Confucian Studies (儒学研究中心), the Institute of Literature, History, and Philosophy (文史哲研究院), and the Editorial Department of Literature, History, and Philosophy (文史哲) into a unified, new Advanced Institute for Confucian Studies. While the name of the Institute of Literature, History, and Philosophy was retained, the Editorial Department of Literature, History, and Philosophy was established as a relatively independent entity.

The original Institute of Literature, History, and Philosophy was established in 2002, formed through the merger of the old Institute of Literature, History, and Philosophy (文史哲研究所, established in 1983), the Institute for the Collation of Ancient Texts (古籍整理研究所, established in 1983), and the Institute of Folklore (民俗研究所, established in 1985). The original Center for Confucian Studies was established in 2005. The journal Literature, History, and Philosophy was first published in 1951.

== Academics ==
The Institute spans four disciplines—Chinese Language and Literature, History, Philosophy, and Sociology. It currently administers two independent doctoral programs: Chinese Classical Philology and Chinese Folk Literature. Furthermore, in collaboration with other schools and departments, it jointly administers eight additional doctoral programs: Ancient Chinese Literature, Chinese Linguistics and Philology, Historiography and the History of Historiography, Specialized History, Modern and Contemporary Chinese History, Western Philosophy, Chinese Philosophy, and Philosophy of Science and Technology.

It also jointly maintains three postdoctoral research stations covering Philosophy, Literature, and History. Additionally, the institute offers twelve master's programs: Western Philosophy, Chinese Philosophy, Philosophy of Science and Technology, Folklore, Chinese Folk Literature, Literary Theory and Criticism, Chinese Linguistics and Philology, Chinese Classical Philology, Ancient Chinese Literature, Historiography and the History of Historiography, Specialized History, and Modern and Contemporary Chinese History.
