= Jurong Country Garden School =

- 句容碧桂园学校

Location
- No. 3 Qiuzhi Road, Economic Development Zone, Jurong District, Zhenjiang City, Jiangsu Province, China

Information
- School type: International
- Motto: 中国灵魂, 世界情怀. (To cultivate students with Chinese Identities and International Mindedness.)
- Established: September 2013
- Founder: Yang Guoqiang

Jurong Country Garden School (JCGS) is a private international school that opened on September 1, 2013, operated by Bright Scholar Education Group, and was established by the chair of the board of Country Garden - Mr. Yang Guoqiang. JCGS currently has 1300 students.

The school is located in Country Garden Phoenix Community in the Jurong Economic Development Zone, which is part of the Yangtze River Delta and close to developed cities such as Shanghai, Hangzhou, and Nanjing.

== Curriculum ==
The school offers a 15-year International Baccalaureate education for all three programmes (PYP, MYP and DP).

== Facilities ==
The school covers an area of approximately 134,000 m^{2}, including a construction area of 160,000 m^{2}, and has a maximum capacity of 24 kindergarten classes, 50 PYP classes, 50 MYP classes, and 20 DP classes, with a total enrollment of 3,600 students.

JCGS has three swimming pools, a sports field, a gymnasium, a library, a theater, a lecture hall, a variety of laboratories, and specialist classrooms. All classrooms have interactive whiteboards, televisions, computers, digital radios, and other technological learning aids.
