= National Society of Collegiate Scholars =

American student honor society

- NSCS
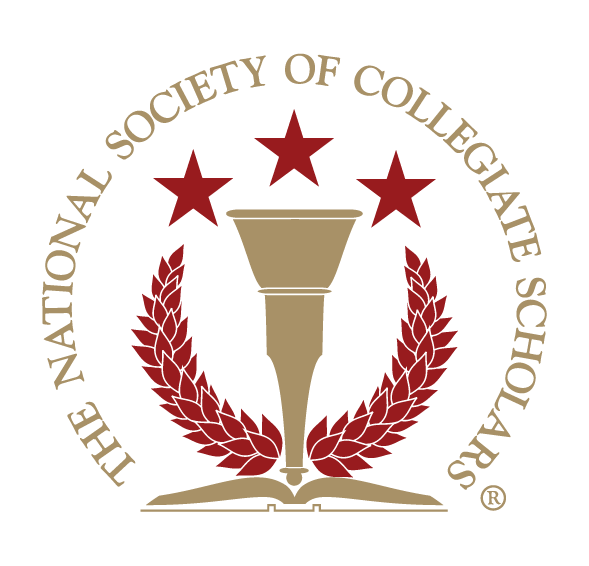
- Founded: April 30, 1994; 32 years ago George Washington University
- Type: Honor
- Affiliation: ACHS
- Status: Active
- Scope: National
- Pillars: Scholarship, Leadership, Service
- Colors: Crimson and Gold
- Publication: 3 Pillars Blog
- Philanthropy: Active Minds
- Chapters: 260
- Members: 90,000 active 1,600,000 lifetime
- Headquarters: 2000 M Street NW Suite 480G; Washington, D.C. 20036; United States
- Website: nscs.org

The National Society of Collegiate Scholars (NSCS) is an American academic honor society for college students. It was established in 1994 at George Washington University in Washington, D.C. NSCS has active chapters at nearly 300 colleges and universities in the United States. It is an Association of College Honor Societies member.

== History ==
The National Society of Collegiate Scholars was founded on April 30, 1994 at George Washington University in Washington, DC, by Steve Loflin. At the time, Loflin worked in Student Affairs at George Washington University. Loflin founded NSCS to recognize students who performed well academically during their first years in college and to provide members with an opportunity to take a leadership role in the organization. He also served as its CEO and president.

The first NSCS new member induction ceremony was held on the George Washington University campus on April 30, 1994. The society grew, expanding to other campuses in the United States. It became a 501(c)(3) non-profit organization in 1995. It was admitted to the Association of College Honor Societies in 2004.

In 2012, NSCS had 271 active chapters, 63,000 active members, and 80,000 total members. As of 2025, NSCS had nearly 300 active on-campus chapters and more than 1.6 million lifetime members, including about 90,000 current student members. Its headquarters are at 2000 M Street NW in Washington, D.C.

== Symbols ==
NSCS's symbol is a torch emerging from an open book, surrounded by three stars and a laurel wreath. The torch represents leadership and guidance. The book stands for scholarship and learning. The laurel wreath symbolizes honor and distinction. The three stars represent the society's pillars of scholarship, leadership, and service.

The society's colors are crimson and gold. Its publications are The Collegiate Scholar and Society Magazine.

== Chapters ==
The National Society of Collegiate Scholars has active chapters at nearly 300 colleges and universities in the United States, including Puerto Rico.

== Membership ==
Membership is open to freshmen and sophomore students with at least a 3.4 GPA who are ranked in the top twenty percent of their class.

== Activities ==
The National Society of Collegiate Scholars offers 26 scholarships annually for its members and alumni. In 2017, NSCS partnered with Active Minds to help remove stigmas surrounding mental health.

== Notable members ==
Following are some notable members of the National Society of Collegiate Scholars.

- Keri Blakinger, criminal justice journalist
- Janai Brugger, operatic soprano
- Yang Huiyan, chairman and the majority shareholder of Country Garden Holdings
- Daniel Innis, New Hampshire Senate
- Tim Tebow, football and baseball player

=== Honorary members ===
- Rakesh Agrawal (honorary), chemical engineer
- Jimmy Carter (Georgia Tech, honorary), President of the United States
- Robert Michael Gates (Texas A&M University, honorary), president of Texas A&M University and United States Secretary of Defense
- Charles Marrow (University of Illinois Chicago, honorary), Illinois House of Representatives
- John McCain (University of Arizona, honorary), United States Senate
- Don Plusquellic (University of Akron, honorary), former mayor of Akron, Ohio
- Linwood H. Rose (James Madison University, honorary), president of James Madison University and Virginia Deputy Secretary of Education
- Donna Shalala (University of Miami, honorary), United States Secretary of Health and Human Services and president of the University of Miami
- Lou Anna Simon (honorary), President of the University of Michigan

== Controversies ==
The National Society of Collegiate Scholars has been criticized for charging a membership fee for opportunities that are available for free, with one campus newspaper calling it a "scam".

== See also ==
- Honor cords
