= Jennifer Dugan =

American activist and writer

Jennifer Dugan is an American activist and writer. She is the founder of several national movements including the You-Are-Loved Chalk Message Project and Dreams Untitled.

== National Projects & Campaigns ==
=== You-Are-Loved Chalk Message Project ===
Dugan was best known at Drew University for writing the words, "You are Loved" in sidewalk chalk. She began doing this in 2005 after a coping with a series of tragic events. After her graduation, Dugan launched the You-Are-Loved Chalk Message Project as a national suicide prevention awareness campaign for LGBTQ college students. The project was a recognized, annual event observed by universities across America.

=== Dreams Untitled ===
A common theme throughout Dugan's activism has been connecting one's passions with the greater good. In 2009, she unveiled Dreams Untitled. Dreams Untitled is a national suicide prevention awareness campaign that uses artwork to create "visions of hope for the future."

Dreams Untitled is a national event observed by suicide-prevention advocates and artists.
