= Forest City, Johor =

Private town in Malaysia

Coordinates: 01.34°N 103.59°E

- Special Financial Zone of Malaysia and suburb of Iskandar Puteri
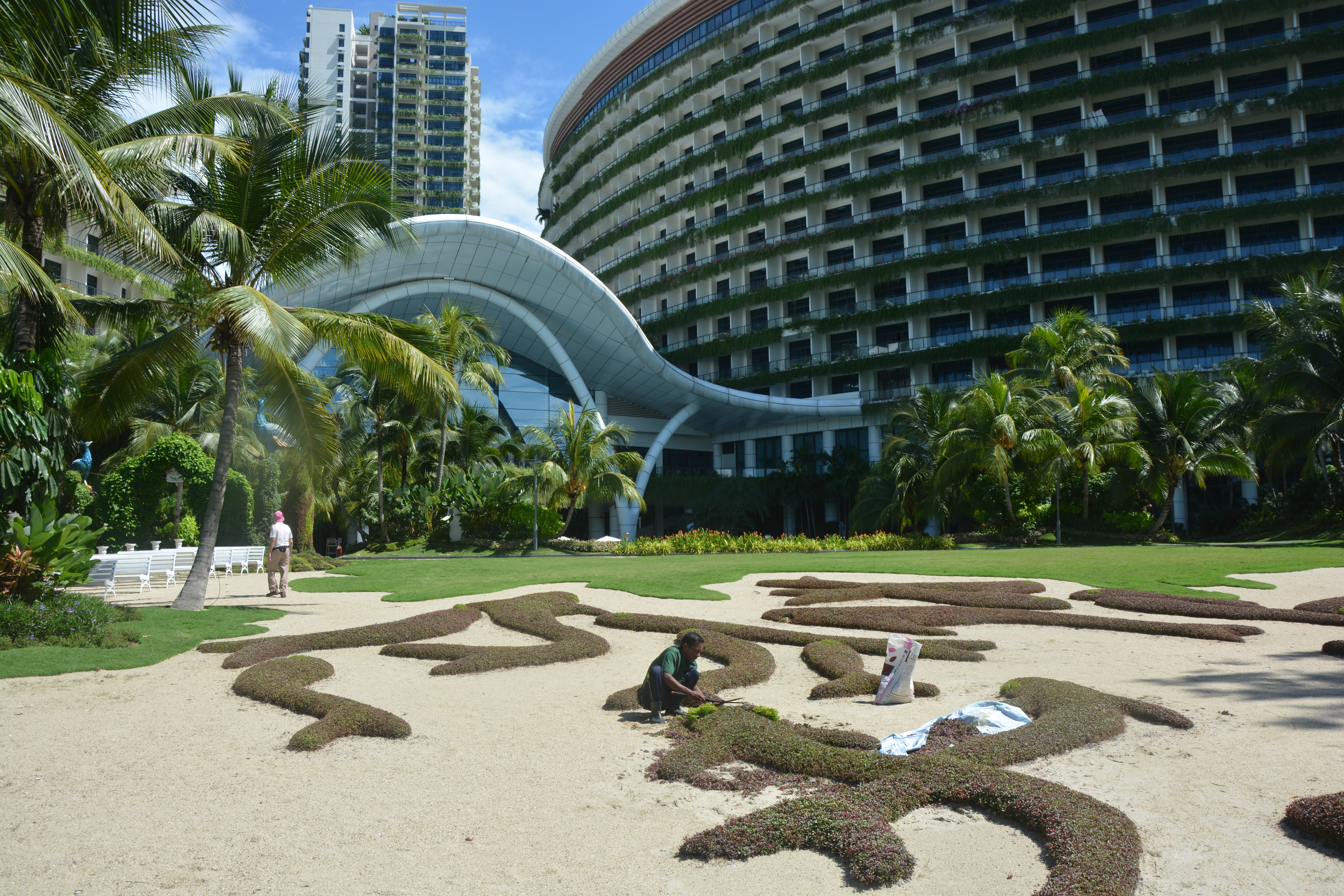
- Interactive map of Forest City, Johor
- Location within Iskandar Malaysia
- Country: Malaysia
- State: Johor
- District: Johor Bahru
- City: Iskandar Puteri

Area
  - Total: 2.83 km^{2} (1.09 sq mi)
- Website: forestcitycgpv.com (archived)

Forest City is an integrated property development and special financial zone (SFZ) in Iskandar Puteri, Johor, Malaysia. It is located on reclaimed land in the southwestern part of Johor Bahru District, the second largest district in Malaysia by population. It was first announced in 2006 as a twenty-year investment project mostly financed by Chinese developer Country Garden, pitched under the Belt and Road Initiative. It was officiated by then Prime Minister of Malaysia Najib Razak in 2016, with the approval of the Sultan of Johor, Sultan Ibrahim Ismail. Forest City is a joint venture between Esplanade Danga 88, an affiliate of state government subsidiary Kumpulan Prasarana Rakyat Johor (KPRJ), and Country Garden Holding Ltd (CGPV), with CGPV holding 60 percent of shares, while KPRJ holds the other 40 percent. Forest City is under the management of the Iskandar Puteri City Council and the Iskandar Regional Development Authority.

The development of Forest City is contentious. The project was not targeted at local Malaysians but rather at upper-middle-class citizens from China who wanted to park their wealth abroad, by offering relatively affordable seafront properties compared to expensive coastal cities within their country such as Shanghai. However, initial strong sales from China collapsed after CCP general secretary Xi Jinping implemented stronger currency controls. Such lackluster sales were exacerbated by the 2020–2022 Malaysian political crisis and the COVID-19 pandemic, with the project being described as a "ghost town" in 2022. The project has also been criticised for causing large amounts of habitat destruction in the vicinity. Since 2024, Forest City has been designated by the government as Malaysia's first tax-free special financial zone, primarily to attract global business services, banking institutions and financial technology companies and revive the area.

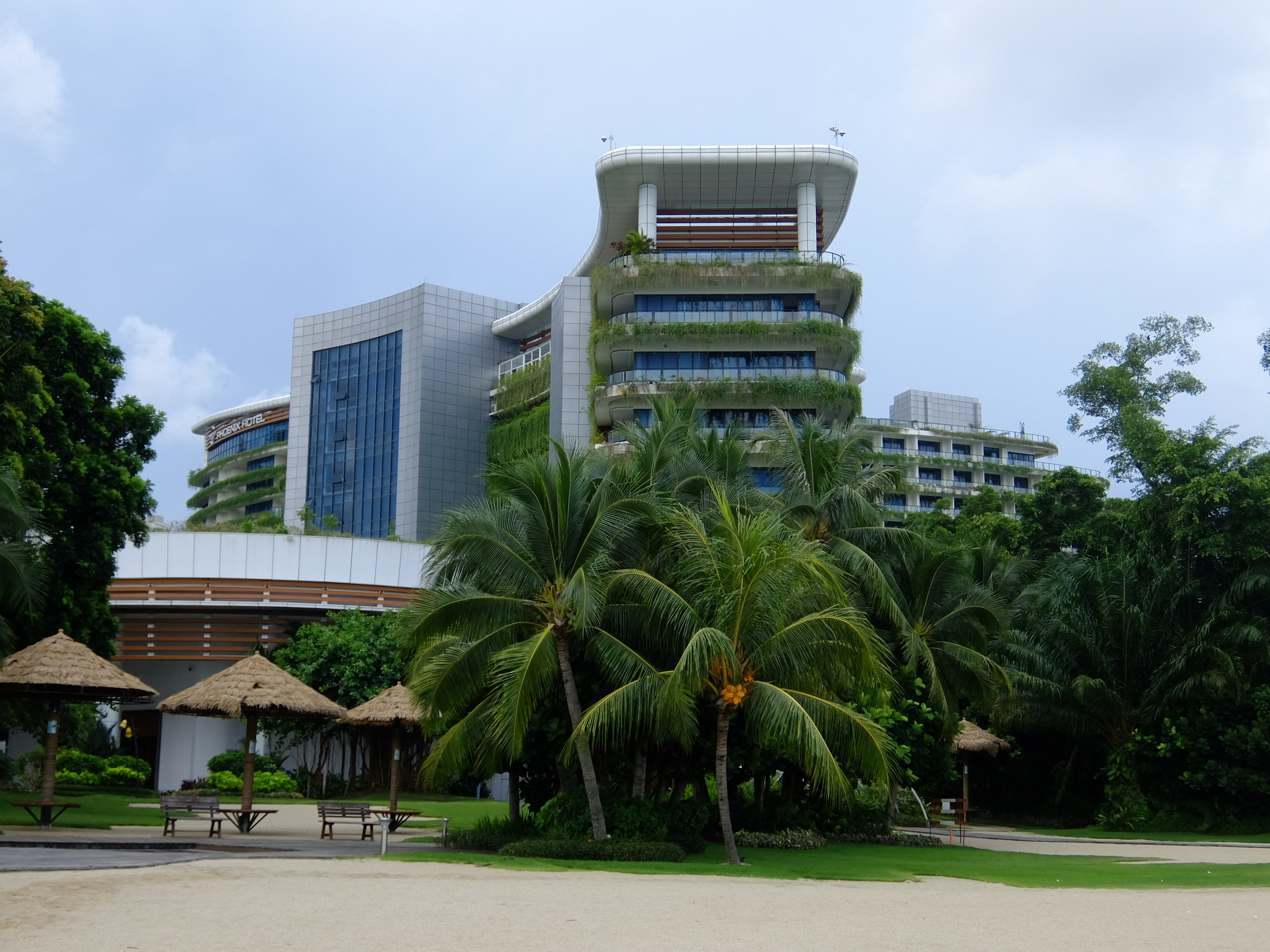
Forest City Phoenix International Marina Hotel

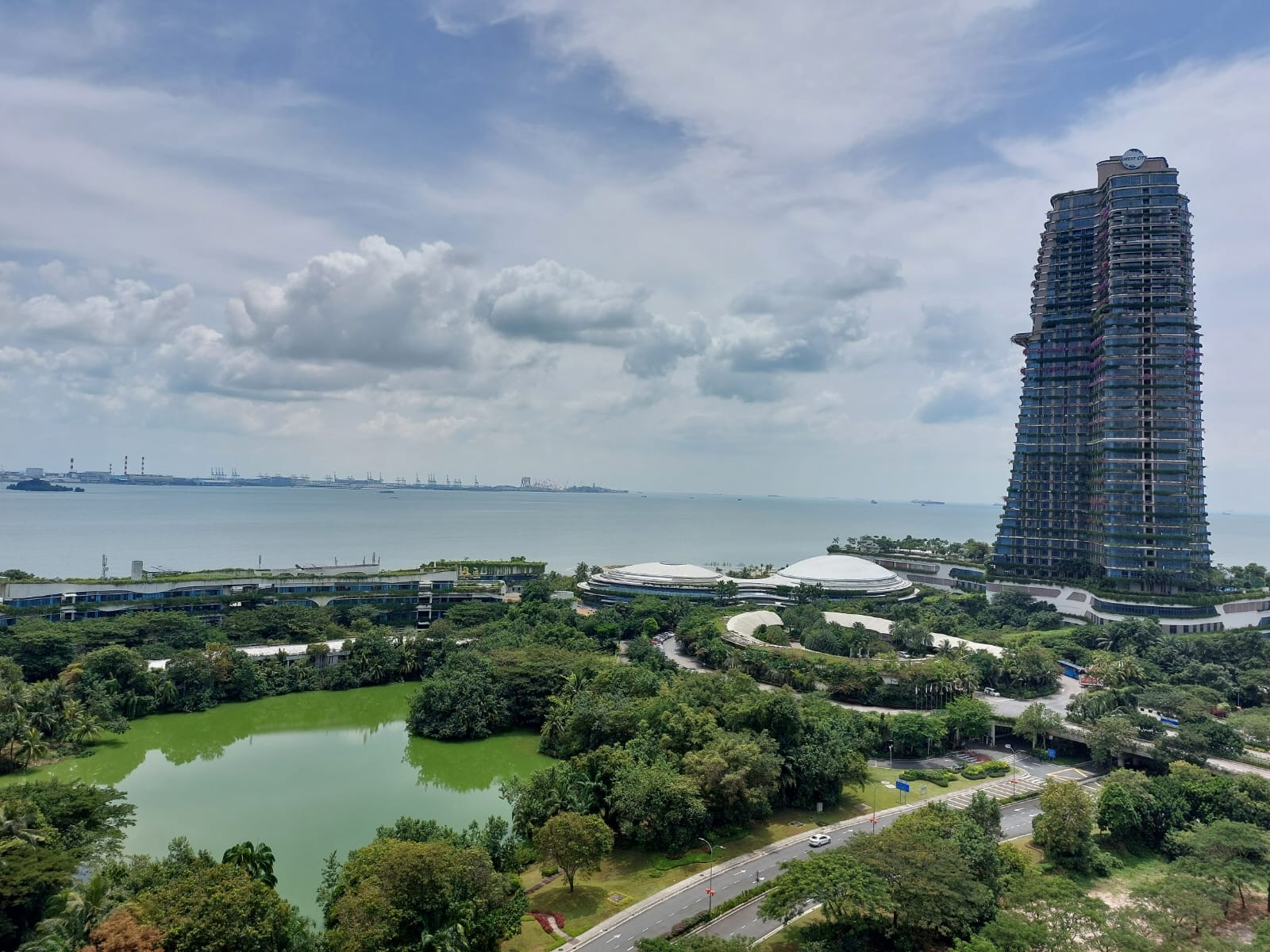
Forest City view

== History ==
In 2006, the Malaysian government established a development corridor in Johor, Malaysia, which was to be known as Iskandar Malaysia. This followed on from studies in the early 2000s that the country and neighboring Singapore could benefit economically from development and investment in Southern Malaysia. As the scale of projects grew in the region over the next decade, the Malaysian government and Chinese real estate developer Country Garden outlined plans for a mega project off the coast of Johor. The initial proposals for Forest City suggested a collection of interconnecting islands, with early proposals suggesting the site could cover an area of 13 square kilometers. The masterplan was broken down into four phases, which each phase having its own use, varying from residential to retail and tourism. Over the coming years, the size and scale of the project changed multiple times, as key stakeholders provided impact assessments on the development. Forest City held its grand opening on 6 March 2016, in an event attended by the Malaysian Prime Minister Najib Razak, who announced that Forest City would be designated as a duty-free zone.

By 2017, the developer had setup numerous showrooms as a focal point for sales activity in various regions. Around the same time, sales figures began to become publicly available for the first time in the media. It was reported that the developer had completed sales for "thousands" of apartments with buyers. On 16 July 2018, the American school Shattuck-Saint Mary's established a campus in Forest City, with student enrollment beginning in the fall of that year. The school rebranded as Forest City International School in 2024. In 2019, Mongabay reported that 16,000 residencies had been sold.

By June 2023, Forest City had a long-term residential population of between 8,000 and 9,000 people, far short of its projected population of 700,000.

In July 2024, the Malaysian Parliament passed five bills designating Forest City Island 1 as a duty-free island. Further plans are in place to expand duty-free categories and apply for exemptions on consumption and import taxes.

On 20 September 2024, the government announced incentives for Forest City Special Financial Zone (SFZ). As of 2025, more than 30 local and international investors are reported to have expressed interests to set up family offices in Forest City as part of the tax-free initiatives.

Also in 2024, the island received international press attention for the opening in Forest City of Tech Entrepreneur Balaji Srinivasan's Network School. Network School's business license was cancelled in July 2026.

In 2025, a number of transport initiatives were announced to improve connectivity with both mainland Malaysia and Singapore. The FC1 bus transit between Forest City and KSAB CIQ at the Second Link would see its operating times extended. A second service known as FC2 would be launched in late 2025 to link Forest City with the economic zone of Iskandar Malaysia. Weekend services directly between Forest City and Kuala Lumpur would also be introduced. The Johor government endorsed the need for more direct connections between Forest City and Singapore.

In July 2026, Srinivasan's Network School in the island was shut down by the government for alleged administrative violations, soon after sparking controversy amid accusations of harboring citizens of Israel, who are banned from entering Malaysia.

== Geography ==
Forest City is a Malaysian island located in the Johor Strait, which separates Malaysia and the island nation of Singapore. It is a man-made island which was created after the Malaysian government approved plans to reclaim land in the Strait for development. The island-city is accessible from mainland Malaysia via a dual carriageway connecting it to the island.

The strait is known as a major location of seagrass meadows in Malaysia, with numerous initiatives in the waters around Forest City to preserve and restore seagrass meadows in the Johor Strait.

== Controversies ==
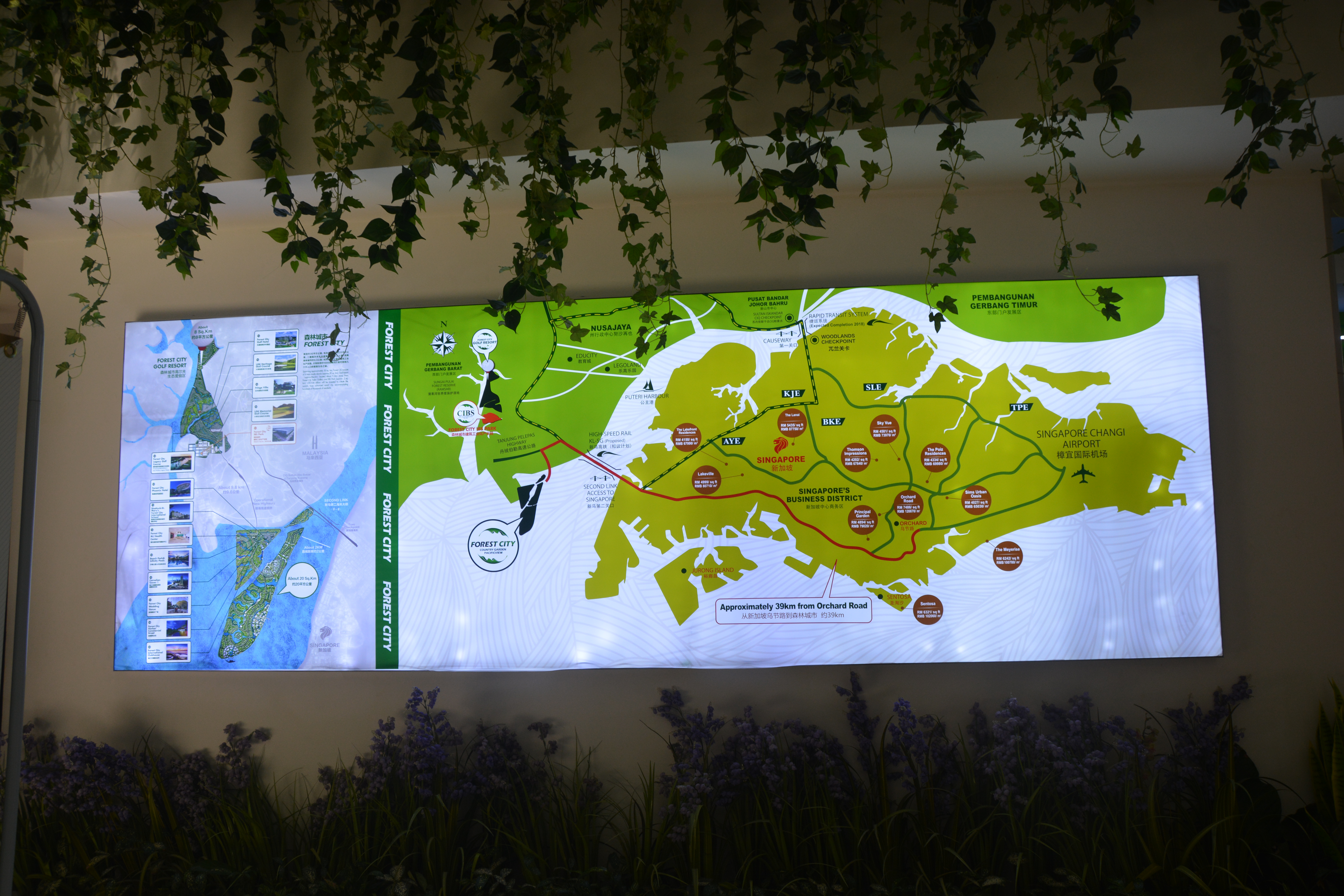
Location map of Forest City as showcased in its sales center, stating its close location with Singapore as a selling point

=== Environmental impact ===
Despite being marketed as "an energy-efficient, ecologically sensitive, land-conserving, low-polluting offshore city", the development has had significant negative environmental impact, with irreversible damage due to reclamation of ecologically sensitive coastal wetlands.

The area within which Forest City lies is protected as an Environmentally Sensitive Area (ESA) Rank 1 area, where no development is allowed except for low-impact nature tourism, research and education. Chief to this designation are two areas of international ecological significance, the Tanjung Kupang intertidal seagrass meadow, the largest of its kind in Malaysia, and the Pulai River Mangrove Forest Reserve, designated as a wetland of international importance under the Ramsar Convention.

Reclamation began in January 2014 without the legally required Detailed Environmental Impact Assessment (DEIA). Residents from Kampung Tanjung Kupang, a traditional fishing village, complained of reduced catches and other issues to the local and Johor State authorities to no avail.

Malaysia had also not informed Singapore as required under their 2005 International Tribunal for the Law of the Sea–mediated agreement on reclamation works and other treaties. Singapore subsequently sent a diplomatic note in May 2014 to the Malaysian Federal government requesting clarification on issues including: potential changes in water current speeds and the subsequent impact on navigational safety; possible erosion that might affect shoreline and Malaysia–Singapore Second Link bridge infrastructure; and changes in water quality and morphology that might affect the coastal and marine environment and local fish farms. Following this and an accompanying outcry by international environmental watchdogs, the Environment Ministry sent a request for the DEIA to Country Garden on 6 June 2014, and issued a stop-work order on 17 June 2014, although it was reported that work continued despite the stop-work order.

The DEIA was issued in January 2015, confirming that the regulations had been side-stepped and contained 81 directives, including a reduction in size from 1,600 hectares (4,000 acres) to less than 405 hectares (1,000 acres). It acknowledged that the seagrass ecosystem had been split into two and "will be heavily impacted by the proposed development" despite these measures. Country Garden subsequently announced that it was downsizing the project by a third and dividing it into four islands, although there was subsequent evidence that some of these measures were not implemented, including photographs where silt curtains were absent and of buffer zones that were less than 100m (as opposed to the agreed 300m). Concerns also remained about the permanent impact on the seagrass, water hydrology, and loss of traditional fishing grounds, which these measures will not fully alleviate.

Other environmental concerns include claims that sand from local hills was being used at the project site and fears of stress on local water sources and sewage discharge. Fishermen also reported the reduced space for fishing in the Johor Straits due to the land reclamation work had forced them further out into the sea, resulting in occasions where they were accused of crossing the international boundary line with Singapore.

=== Safety considerations ===
Cracks began to appear in the Show Gallery, hotel buildings and nearby roads shortly after construction. The rapid pace of development following land reclamation without allowing sufficient time for the soil to settle and stabilise was cited as a likely cause. A building consultant observed that the reclaimed land was sinking and warned that the subsidence was expected to continue.

== Coverage and criticism ==
Following the 2018 change in Malaysian government and subsequent political uncertainty, the worsening geopolitical environment between Malaysia and China, and suspension of the Malaysia My Second Home long term visa scheme, some Chinese nationals (who formed the majority of buyers) decided to leave the development and sold their units at steep losses, further adding to the supply overhang.

While Country Garden employed some locals, most of Forest City's workforce comprised low-wage labourers from South Asia or white-collar workers from China.

In 2018, Mahathir Mohamad, campaigning on a platform which included criticism of Chinese investment and corruption, defeated the incumbent Malaysian prime minister Najib Razak who had originally approved the project, and issued a "ban" on foreigners buying property. This was subsequently re-structured as changes to the long term visa program in order to mitigate objections and potential legal challenges raised by the developer.

Forest City has been described as one of the world's "most useless" megaprojects, and by the American magazine Foreign Policy as a "massive boondoggle". By the end of 2019, only 15,000 units had been sold, compared to a target of 700,000, and as few as 500 people lived in the development. There were multiple allegations of corruption at various levels and multiple stages of the project. In addition, the residential units were priced according to the then-booming housing market in China, so local Malaysians were unable to afford them. Indicative of its clientele, the road signage was often exclusively written in Chinese while the few schools that opened only taught Mandarin, which is not an official language in Malaysia.

In 2020, the COVID-19 pandemic led to increasing economic uncertainty and travel restrictions, severely affecting sales which dropped by more than 90% after March 2020. Following implementation of Malaysia's Movement Control Order, some residents returned to their home countries. COVID-19 restrictions on travel between Malaysia and Singapore presented difficulties for the remaining residents, especially those working in or with children schooling in Singapore. Some tenants also suspended operations or pulled out, citing restrictions due to the Movement Control Order or commercial non-viability. The developer subsequently laid-off at least two-thirds of its staff, after having sold less than ten properties in 18 months.

In August 2023, the developer Country Garden joined the ranks of once-strong Chinese property developers in deferring millions of dollars in debt payments. This was followed in October 2023 by cross defaults in up to $11 billion of offshore bonds, raising fears that overseas projects and assets such as Forest City would be sold or seized by creditors during the debt restructuring, such as had happened to Risland Australia in the weeks prior to the default.

Forest City has received attention for its hosting, from 2024 to 2026, of The Network School, founded by tech entrepreneur Balaji Srinivasan. The school initially attracted press scrutiny for its apparent association with Srinivasan's promotion of the creation of "Network States" - proposed future homes for digital communities in areas outside the control of the world's countries. Later, the school became the center of a controversy in Malaysia over its alleged harboring of Israeli citizens, who are banned from entering the country under Malaysian law, and the government ordered it to end operations in Malaysia after an investigation allegedly revealed administrative violations in its operation.

== See also ==
- Iskandar Malaysia
- Economy of Johor
- Belt and Road Initiative
- Land reclamation
- Habitat destruction
