= Economy of Johor =

Economy of a Malaysian state

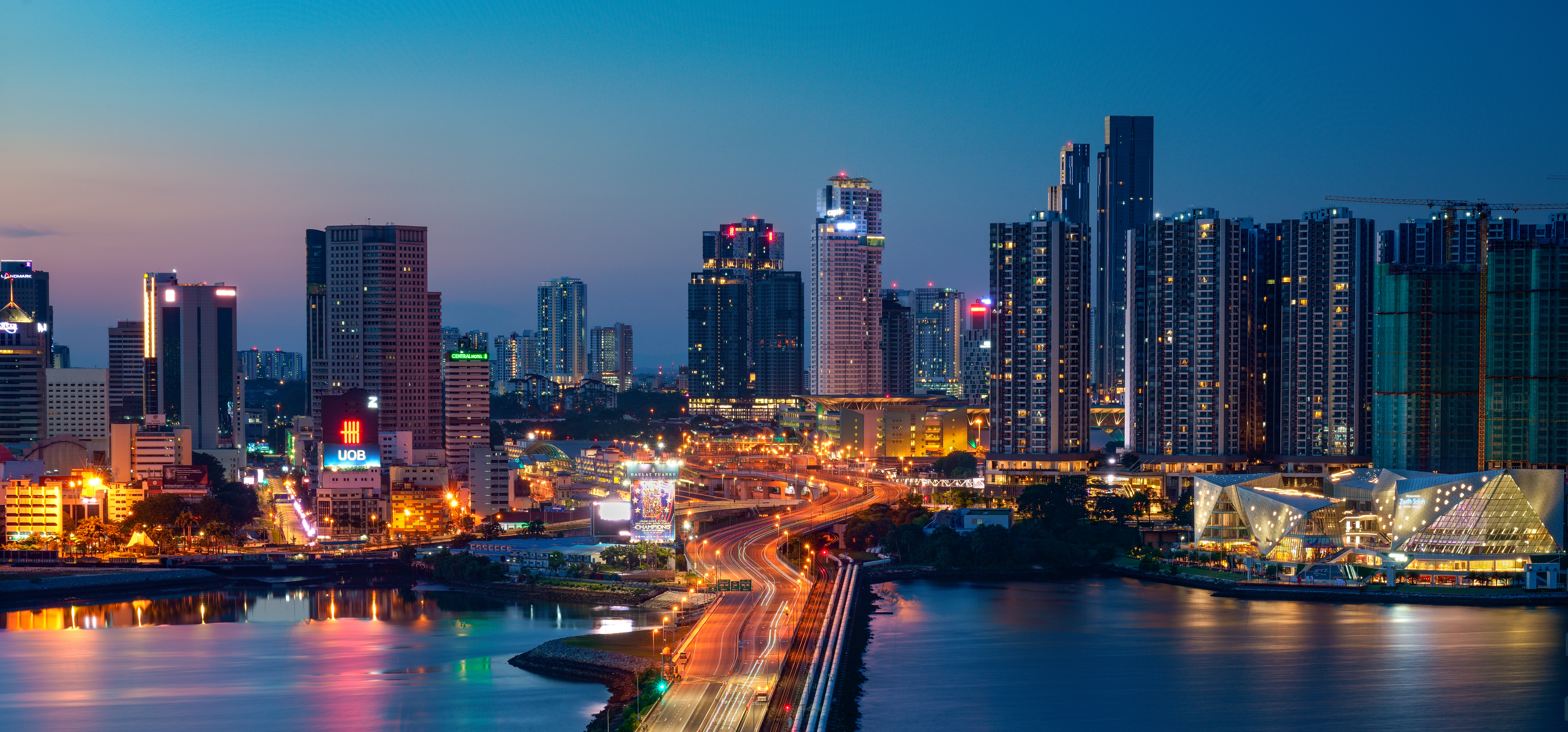
- Johor Bahru Central Business District at night.
- Currency: Malaysian Ringgit (RM or MYR)

Statistics
- Population: 4.19 million (2024)
- GDP: ▲RM 148.2 billion (2023)
- GDP growth: 3.4% (2022/23)
- GDP per capita: ▲RM 41,902 (2023)
- Gini coefficient: 0.404 (2021)
- Human Development Index: 0.811 (2024) high
- Unemployment: ▼2.4% (2022/23)
- Main industries: Services, manufacturing, agriculture and construction

External
- Exports: RM 314.06 billion (2023)
- Export goods: Refined petroleum, integrated circuit boards and electricity and electronics products
- Imports: RM 249.25 billion (2022/23)

Public finance
- Government debt: RM 222.39 million (2020)
- Revenue: RM 1.804 billion (2023/24)
- Spending: RM 1.799 billion (2023/24)
- All values, unless otherwise stated, are in US dollars.

The state of Johor is strategically located in southern Malaysia, bordering one of the global economic powerhouses Singapore. Johor has the world's second largest artificial intelligence hub. It is the second-largest state economy in Malaysia after Selangor, as well as the largest outside of the Klang Valley. Johor has the fastest economic growth among all Malaysian states in 2025.

The economy is primarily driven by manufacturing and service sectors, covering almost 80% of the state GDP. Its gross domestic product (GDP) is valued at RM 158 billion. Johor is the second largest trade contributor in Malaysia, and has the second largest share of the country's imports, after Selangor.

As Malaysia's top investment destination, as well as one of Asia's largest data centres and transshipment hubs, Johor has attracted numerous foreign direct investment (FDI) and multinational corporations, particularly in services, manufacturing, and logistics sectors. Johor's strategic geographical location and active economic activities also place its main port of entry, Port of Tanjung Pelepas, among the 15 busiest ports in the world. The state capital, Johor Bahru, was ranked the world's 20th most attractive city for businesses, second in Malaysia after Kuala Lumpur, according to Oliver Wyman.

== History ==
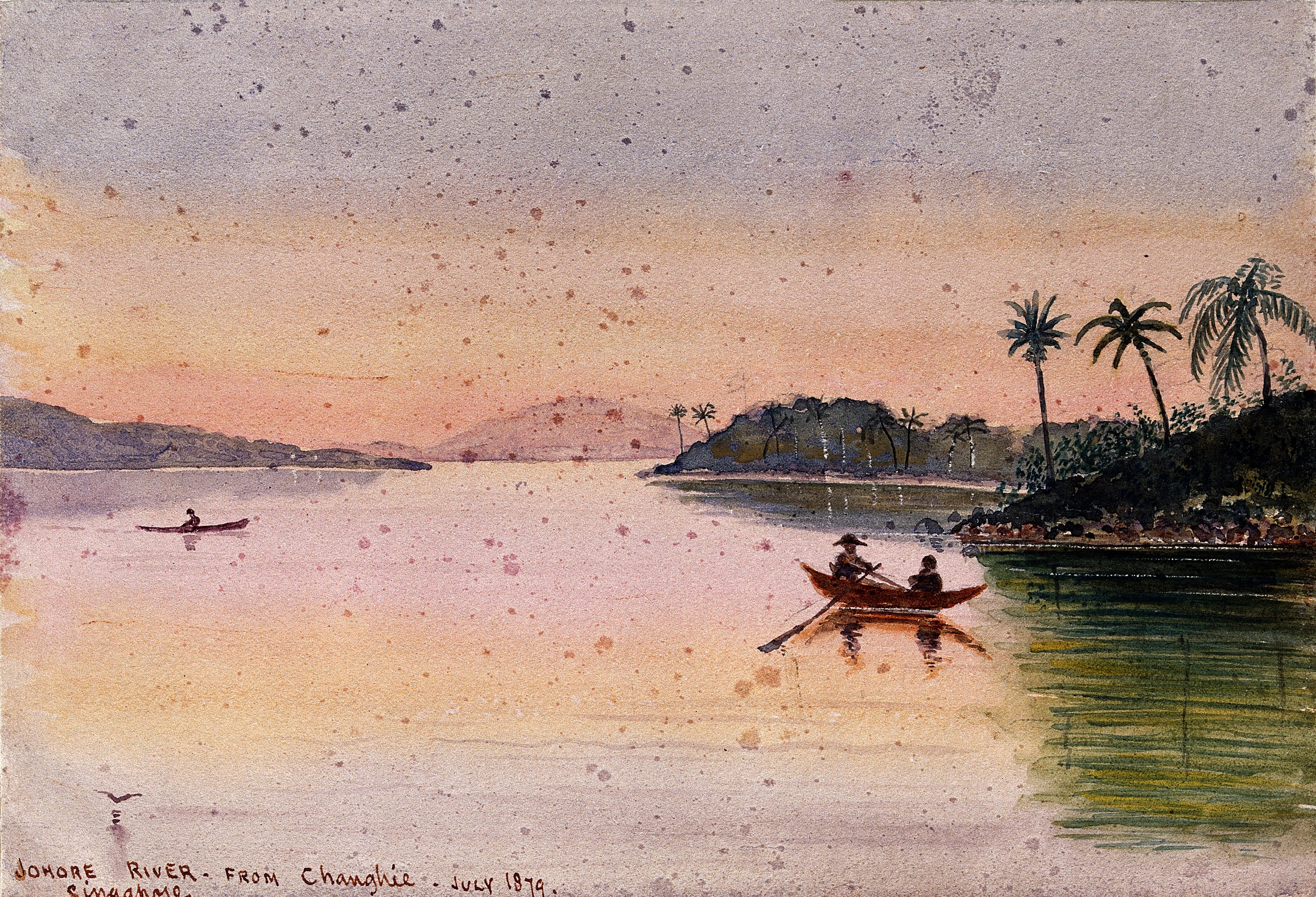
A painting by the English painter John Edmund Taylor, showing people in rowboats on the Johor River in the evening seen from Changi in Singapore, July 1879

Johor's economic history can be traced back to the early 16th century when it was part of the Malacca Sultanate. Following the fall of Malacca to the Portuguese in 1511, the Sultanate of Johor was established by Sultan Alauddin Riayat Shah II in 1528. During this period, Johor became a significant trading hub due to its strategic location along the Straits of Malacca, facilitating trade between the East and the West.

In 1914, Johor became a de facto British protectorate. Thereafter, large-scale agricultural activities were gradually introduced, particularly the cultivation of pepper and gambier, which were highly sought after commodities. Refugee labour from China played a crucial role in developing these plantations. The extension of the railway from the tin and rubber belt of the Malay Peninsula to Singapore in 1919 further integrated Johor into the regional economy. This greatly facilitated the export of agricultural products, particularly rubber, which became a major economic driver in the early 20th century.

Following Malaysia's independence in 1957, Johor continued to diversify its economy. The state capital, Johor Bahru, emerged as a regional industrial and commercial center. The state's median income was RM5,652 in 2024, making it the state with the second highest median household income after Selangor. In 2024, Johor had the fastest GDP growth rate among all Malaysian states at 6.4 percent.

== Sectors ==
=== Services and Manufacturing ===
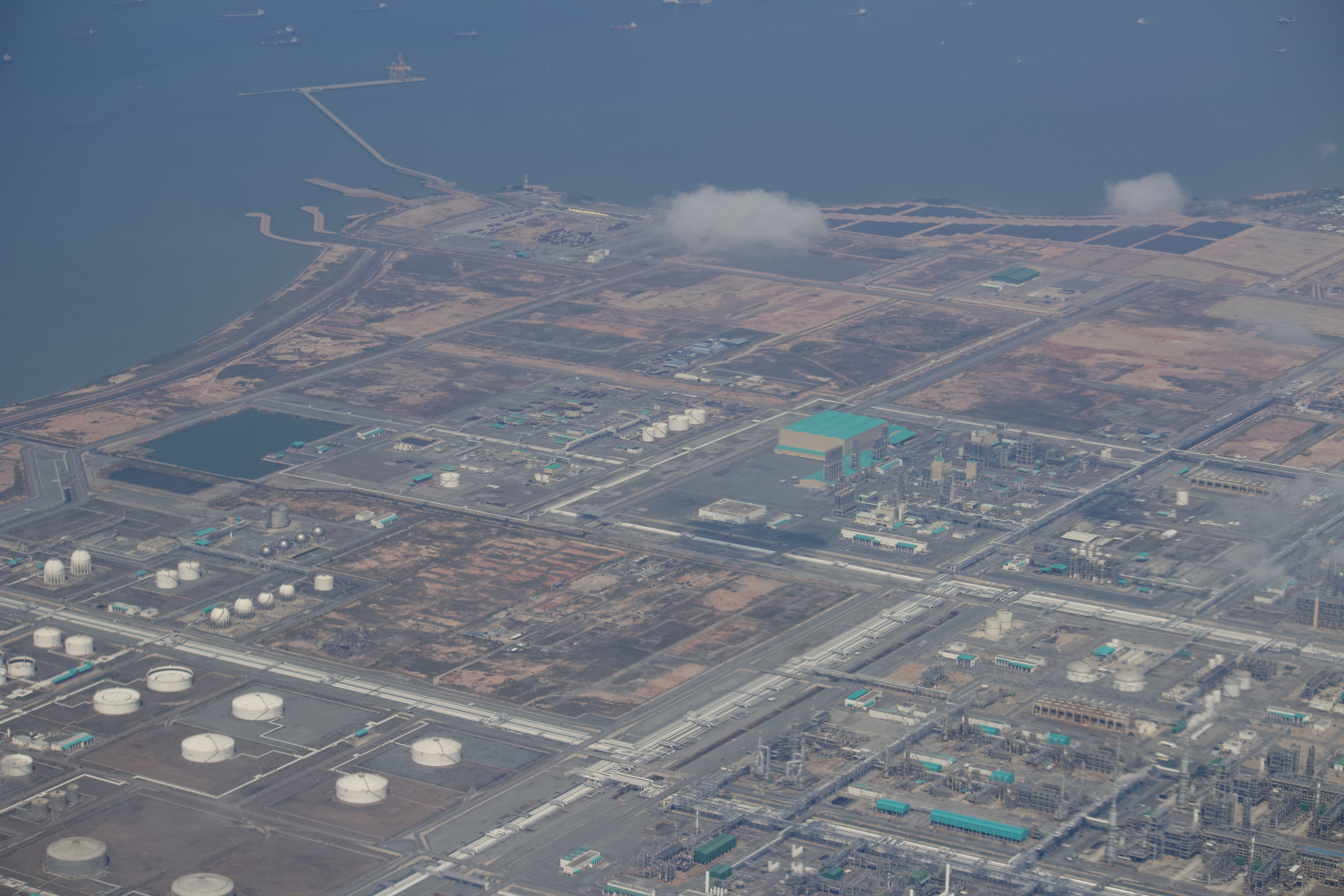
Pengerang Integrated Petroleum Complex (PIPC) is the largest petrochemical hub in Malaysia.

Johor is the top investment destination in Malaysia and one of the most attractive in the region, primarily in the services and manufacturing sectors, which account for nearly 80% of the state's GDP. It has been ranked the top state in Malaysia for six consecutive years in approved manufacturing projects valued at RM145 billion from 2013 to 2018. The state attracted the highest foreign direct investment (FDI) among all Malaysian states in 2022, primarily in the manufacturing sector. In 2017, RM16.8 billion came from domestic direct investment and RM5.1 billion came from foreign direct investment, with Australia, China and the United States being the top three foreign investors in manufacturing.

Johor is the second largest trade contributor in Malaysia, and has the second largest share of the country's imports, after Selangor. The state is also Southeast Asia's largest data centre hub and the third largest in Asia Pacific. As a prominent regional manufacturing hub, the state is home to major multinational corporations (MNCs) in Malaysia, like ByteDance, Nvidia, Microsoft, Micron, Saudi Aramco, Foxconn, among others.

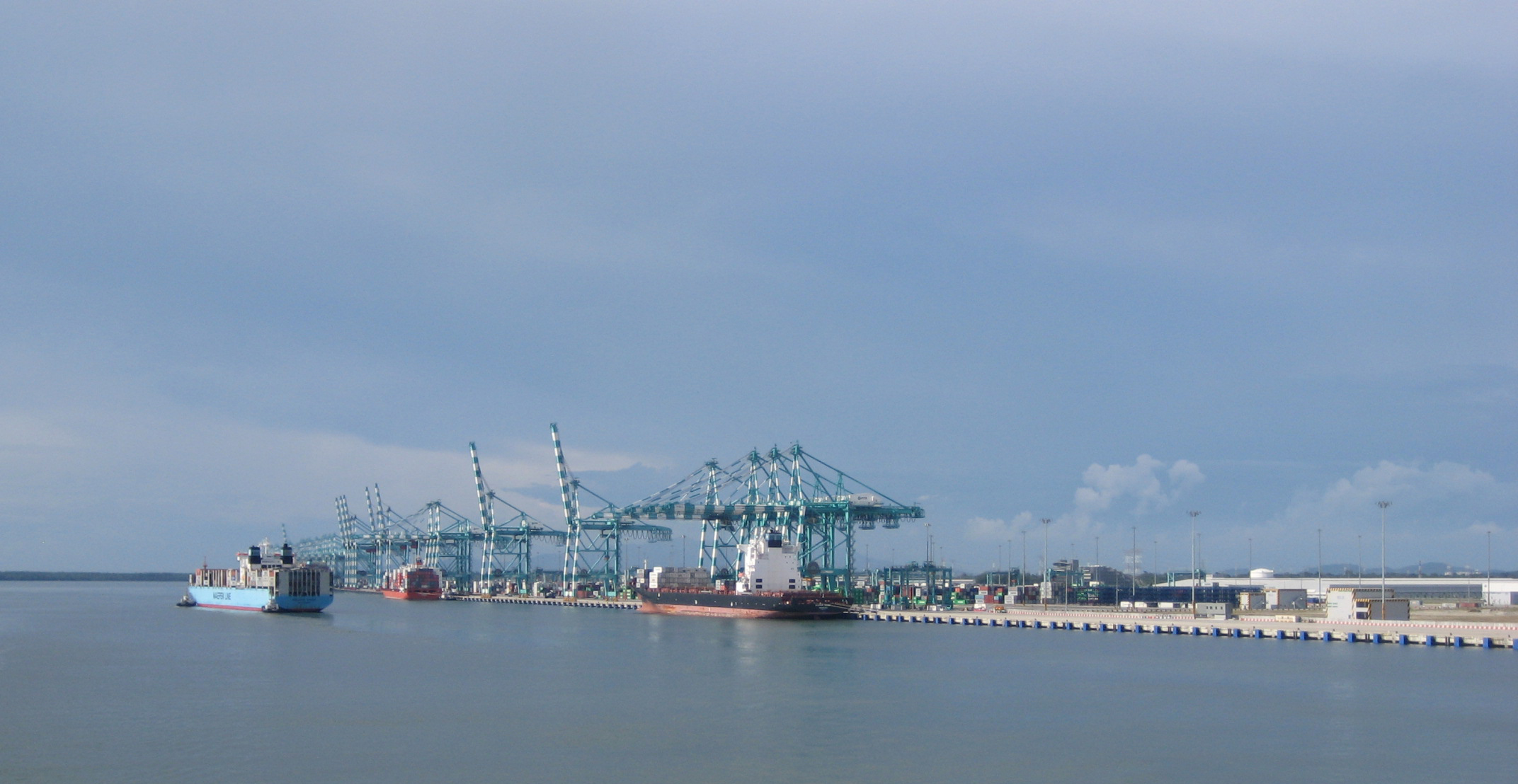
Port of Tanjung Pelepas, the 15th busiest port in the world and the largest transshipment hub in Malaysia.

The state has the largest services sector and real estate development outside the Klang Valley, with the former contributing 8.6 percent of the country's services sector's GDP in 2023. The total industrial area in the state as of 2015 was 144 km^{2} (56 sq mi) or 0.75 per cent of the land in Johor. The state also houses Johor Corporation (JCorp), a state-owned conglomerate involved in various business activities in the state and overseas.

=== Agriculture ===
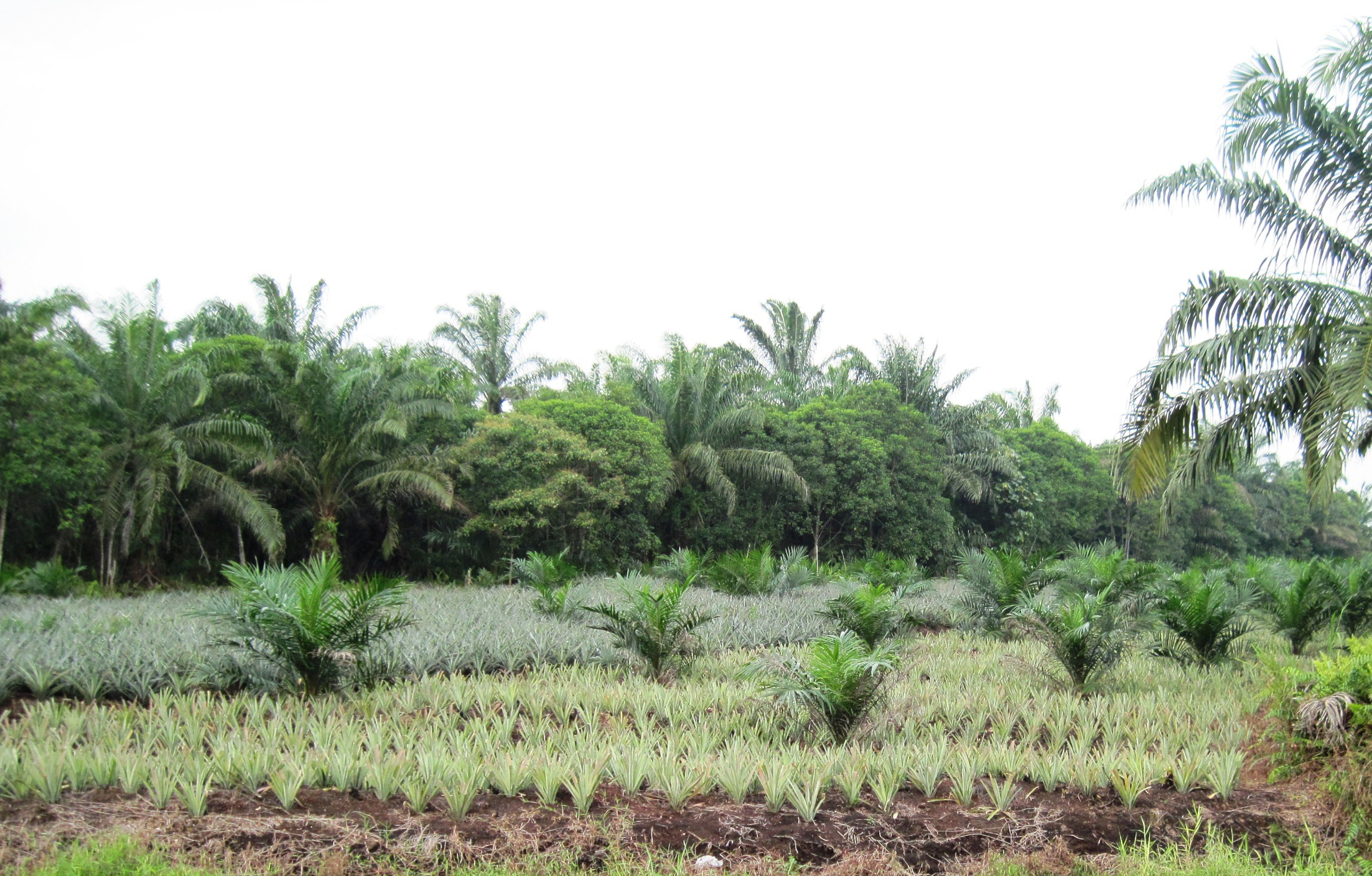
Johor is the largest contributor to agriculture output in Malaysia.

Johor is the largest agriculture output contributor at 17.5% in Malaysia. The main agricultural sectors in the state are palm oil plantations, rubber plantations, and produce. Its palm oil plantations cover almost three-quarters of the agricultural land in the state. Johor Plantation Group (JPG) is the leading corporation in the palm oil industry, which owns 55,904 hectares of land and made its debut on the Malaysian stock market in 2024.

Johor is also the biggest fruit producer in Malaysia, with a total fruit plantation area of 414 km^{2} (160 sq mi) and total harvesting area of 305 km^{2} (118 sq mi). There are around 25,000 registered fruit farmers in Johor and the top five most grown fruits are pineapple, durian, white guava, papaya and banana. In 2021, the total production is 736,136 tonnes, including 569,004 tonnes of fruits and 167,174 tonnes of vegetables.

=== Tourism ===
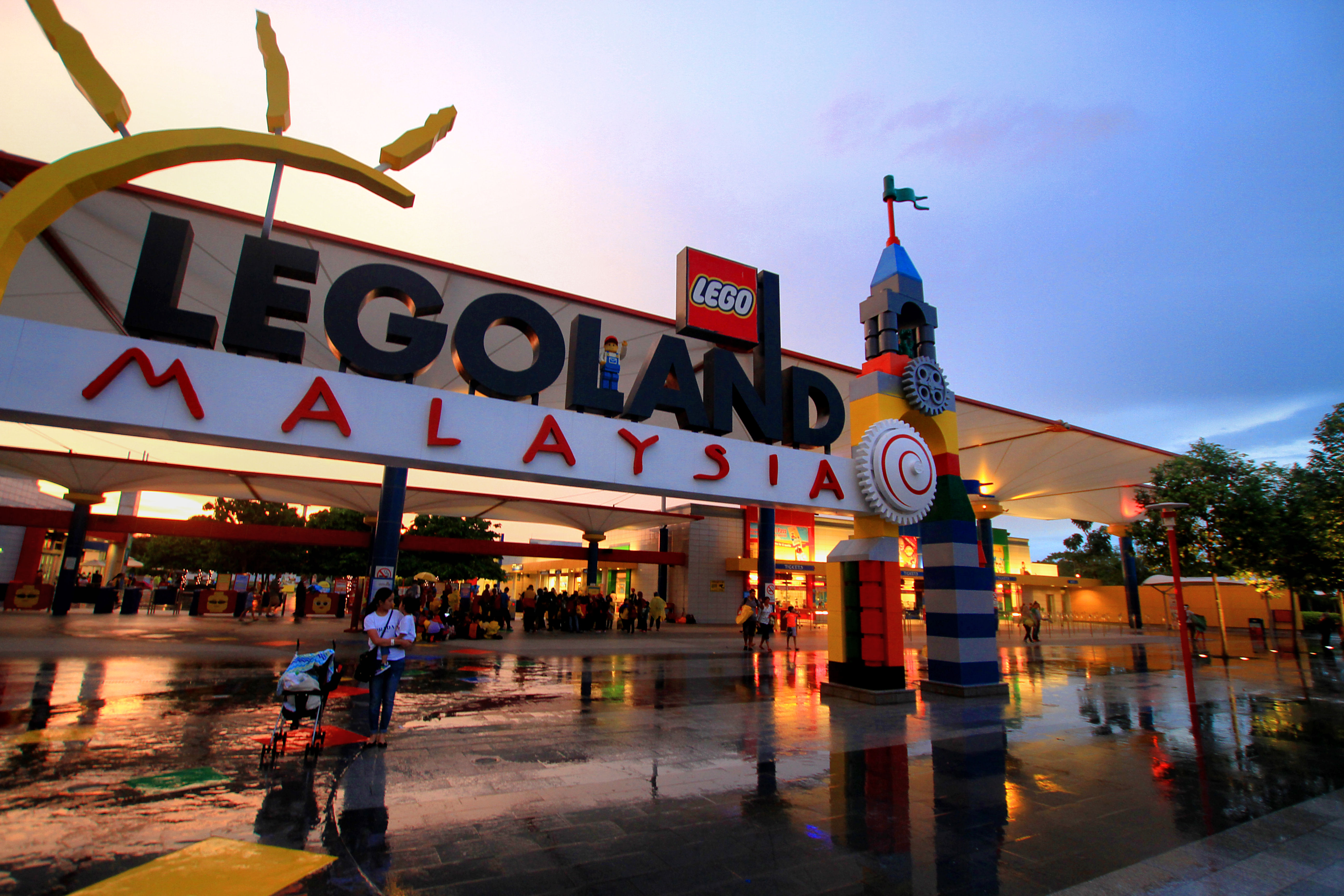
Legoland Malaysia Resort, the first Legoland in Asia.

Johor has a relatively vibrant tourism industry, receiving more than 16 million foreign visitors in 2023, with the bulk of them being Singaporeans. Its capital, Johor Bahru, was also one of the most visited cities in the world, ranked 38th globally in 2019.

Six segments have been identified by the government to be crucial in attracting new tourists, namely ecotourism, sports tourism, medical tourism, education tourism, historical tourism and culinary tourism.

Desaru, 60km away from Johor Bahru, has been named one of the world's 100 greatest places in 2021 by Time magazine, the only destination in Malaysia to make into this list.

== Special Economic Zone ==
=== Iskandar Malaysia ===
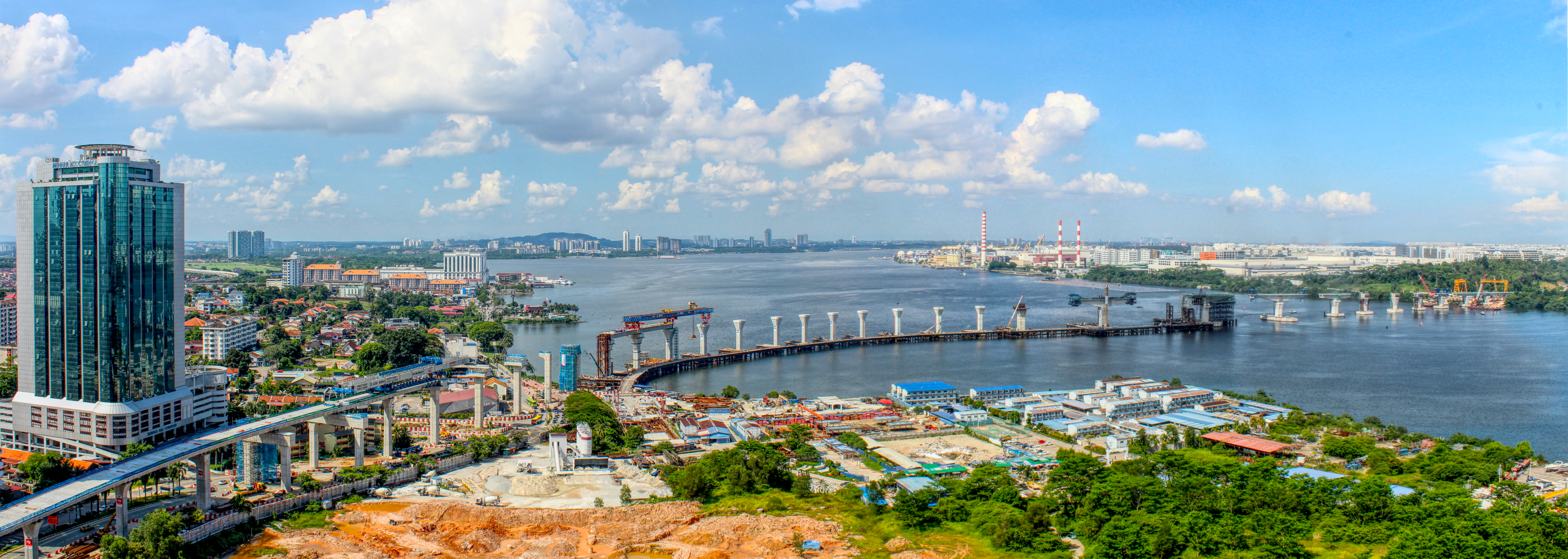
Johor Bahru–Singapore RTS viaducts under construction in Johor Strait

=== Johor-Singapore Special Economic Zone ===
On 11 January 2024, Malaysia's Economy Minister Rafizi Ramli and Singapore's Trade and Industry Minister Gan Kim Yong signed a Memorandum of Understanding (MoU) to work on a Johor-Singapore Special Economic Zone (JS-SEZ). One goal of this cooperation is to build one-stop business investment centre, in terms of less administrative procedures for movement of goods and labour and more favourable business incentives. The ongoing construction of the Johor Bahru–Singapore Rapid Transit System would also greatly benefit further interaction of the two countries.

On 7 Jan 2025, Singapore Prime Minister Lawrence Wong visited Malaysia and signed an agreement with his Malaysian counterpart Anwar Ibrahim on creating the special economic zone. The agreement expects 50 projects in the first five years of the establishment of the special economic zone, which would create an estimated 20,000 jobs and benefit more than 11 industries. However, there are concerns about the lack of skilled labour and causeway congestion.

=== Forest City Special Financial Zone ===
Forest city in Johor has been designated by the government as a Special Financial Zone, thanks to its geographical proximity to the regional economic powerhouse Singapore. The government gives business-friendly incentives such as tax breaks to promote development of the local financial industry.

== See also ==
- Economy of Malaysia
- Johor
