= You-Are-Loved Chalk Message Project =

Annual American LGBTQ demonstration

The You-Are-Loved Chalk Message Project was an annual US-wide initiative that combated hateful rhetoric aimed at the lesbian, gay, bisexual, transgender, and queer (LGBTQ) community through the use of positive, uplifting chalk messages. The project's mission was to send messages of hope to members of the LGBTQ community who were struggling with depression or feelings of isolation. It served as a suicide prevention awareness campaign for LGBTQ college students.

The You-Are-Loved Chalk Message Project was founded at Drew University in 2005 in response to personal tragedy. It went nationwide in 2009 as a suicide prevention awareness campaign for LGBTQ college students. The project continued annually each October until 2012. In May 2012, the Chalk Message Project became part of Active Minds' National Day Without Stigma program.

== Purpose ==
The Chalk Message Project raised awareness about suicide prevention for LGBTQ college students According to the Trevor Project (a 24/7 crisis intervention and suicide prevention lifeline), LGBTQ youth are four to eight times more likely to attempt suicide than heterosexual youth.

While little research has been done on suicide among LGBTQ college students specifically, a 2010 study from Campus Pride suggested a "chilly" climate for America's LGBTQ college students. Suicide is the second leading cause of death among college students in general. According to mental health advocacy groups like Active Minds, over 1,100 college students die by suicide each year.

== History ==
The project first began on the campus of Drew University in 2005. It went nationwide on October 5, 2009 and was observed by universities across the country.

By its sophomore year (2010), the campaign had grown considerably larger. In addition to gaining thousands of followers, the Chalk Message Project attracted positive reactions from the American Foundation for Suicide Prevention, Active Minds, NOH8 Campaign, and occurred in hundreds of locations across country.

In 2012, the Chalk Message Project became part of Active Minds' National Day Without Stigma programming.
