= Yang Huiyan =

Chinese-born billionaire businesswoman (born 1981)

- 杨惠妍
- Born: Yang Huiyan; 1981 (age 44–45); Shunde, Guangdong, China
- Citizenship: China (till 2018); Cyprus (2018–present)
- Education: Ohio State University
- Occupations: Chairman and majority shareholder (55%), Country Garden Holdings
- Known for: Richest Woman in Asia 2007-2020
- Spouse: Chen Chong (m. 2006)
- Parent: Yang Guoqiang (father)

Yang Huiyan (simplified Chinese: 杨惠妍; traditional Chinese: 楊惠妍; pinyin: Yáng Huìyán; born 1981) is a Chinese-born billionaire businesswoman and property developer. She is the chairwoman and the majority shareholder of Country Garden Holdings, a stake largely transferred to her by her father Yang Guoqiang in 2007. Previously the richest woman in Asia, her net worth was still around $5.5 billion as of August 2023, according to the Bloomberg Billionaires Index. In August 2024 she was no longer included in the index.

== Personal life ==
Yang is a 2003 graduate of Bachelor of Arts/Science, Ohio State University where she was a member of The National Society of Collegiate Scholars (NSCS).

According to leaked documents known as "The Cyprus Papers", Yang obtained Cypriot citizenship in 2018, though China does not recognize dual nationality. As of October 2020, Yang's passport status remains uncertain, following the Cyprus government's suspension of the passport scheme. In June 2022, she was recognized by the International Hospitality Institute on the Global 100 in Hospitality, a list featuring the 100 Most Powerful People in Global Hospitality.

== Business career ==
Her father Yang Guoqiang started the real estate company Country Garden in 1997 and transferred 70% of Country Garden's shares to her before its IPO in 2007. Country Garden's initial offering raised about $1.6 billion, or as much as Google raised in 2004 in the United States. As of August 2021, Yang had a net worth of US$27.3 billion. Yang is vice chairman of the board's governance committee and helped raise $410 million selling new shares in 2014, according to Forbes.

In February 2023, due to age reasons, Yang Guoqiang resigned from the position of chairman of the board of Country Garden. The position of chairman was succeeded by Yang Huiyan.

Yang was previously the richest woman in Asia. However, due to the 2020–2023 Chinese property sector crisis, she lost a total of $28.6 billion since 2021, leaving her net worth at $5.5 billion as of August 2023, according to the Bloomberg Billionaires Index.

== Social activity ==
In 2023, Yang Huiyan donated approximately 55% of her personal stake in the property management firm, valued at around US$826 million, to a charity founded by her younger sister. This philanthropic move comes as the company grapples with China's real estate crisis, and Yang's fortune has declined by 80% in the past two years. Despite the donation, she will retain control of over 36% of the shares through voting rights. The Guoqiang Foundation Hong Kong, the recipient of the donation, has committed not to sell the shares for the next decade, with the proceeds intended to support various charitable causes in Hong Kong, the Greater Bay Area, and mainland China.
