= Yang Guoqiang =

Chinese real estate entrepreneur

Yeung Kwok Keung
- 楊國強
- Born: Yang Guoqiang; October 9, 1954 (age 71); Shunde, Guangdong, China
- Other names: Yang Guoqiang
- Occupations: Special Adviser of Country Garden; Former Chairman of Country Garden
- Successor: Yang Huiyan
- Children: Yang Huiyan; Yang Ziying

Yang Guoqiang (Chinese: 杨国强; pinyin: Yáng Guóqiáng; Jyutping: Yeung Kwok Keung; born October 9, 1954, in Shunde, Guangdong), is a Chinese entrepreneur, the founder and special advisor of Country Garden Group, one of the largest private real estate developers in Guangdong Province, Mainland China. Yang resigned as chairman and executive director of Country Garden on March 1, 2023.

The Country Garden Group listed on the Hong Kong Stock Exchange in April 2007.
