= Country Garden =

Chinese property development company

Country Garden Holdings Company Limited

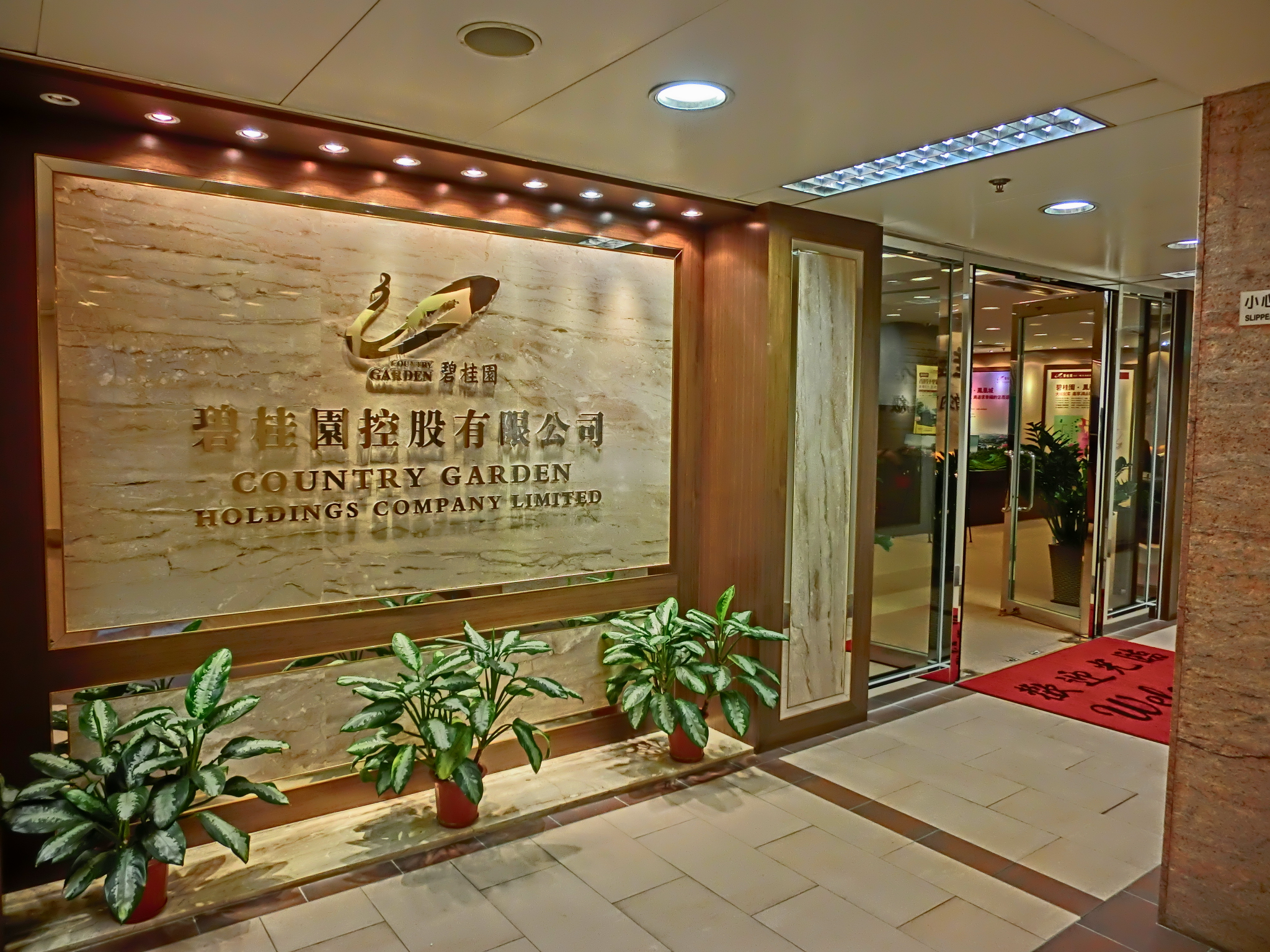
- Entrance of Country Garden Hong Kong office
- Native name: 碧桂园控股有限公司
- Type: Public
- Traded as: SEHK: 2007; Hang Seng Index component
- Industry: Real estate, education
- Founded: 1992
- Founder: Yang Guoqiang
- Headquarters: Shunde, Guangdong, China
- Area served: China, Malaysia, Australia
- Key people: Chairman: Yang Huiyan (楊惠妍); Largest shareholder: Yang Huiyan
- Products: Landed & high-rise residential, commercial, leisure and hospitality developments
- Services: Property and facilities management, hotel management, schools
- Revenue: ▼US$ 63,978.9 million (2023)
- Net income: ▼US$ -899.7 million (2023)
- Total assets: US$ 252,923.9 million (2023)
- Total equity: ▲US$ 29,522.6 million (2023)
- Number of employees: ▼69,932 (2023)
- Subsidiaries: Country Garden Properties (Malaysia) Sdn. Bhd., Country Garden Danga Bay Sdn. Bhd.
- Website: countrygarden.com.cn

Country Garden (Chinese: 碧桂园; pinyin: Bìguìyuán; Jyutping: bik1 gwai3 jyun4) is a real estate development company headquartered in Shunde, Foshan, Guangdong, China. It is owned by Yang Guoqiang's family.

The company ranked 206th in Fortune Global 500 list of 2023. Country Garden features a market capitalization of over US$29.84 billion as of 2018; with 187 high-end township developments throughout China, Malaysia and Australia among its vast international project portfolio. The company is incorporated in the Cayman Islands.

In October 2023, the company announced that it was unable to fulfill its offshore debt obligations and was subsequently deemed in default on approximately US$11 billion of bonds, making it another victim of the 2020–2023 Chinese property sector crisis.

In July 2024, the Hong Kong High Court decided to postpone the hearing of Country Garden's liquidation petition to January 20, 2025, giving the company some breathing room to finalize its offshore debt restructuring plan. On January 16, 2025, the company presented a proposal to its offshore creditors aimed at reducing $11.6 billion in debt.

== History ==
Yang Guoqiang founded Country Garden in 1992 in Shunde, Guangdong. He built the company from scratch, having previously worked as a farmer and on construction sites. The company now has interests in property development, construction, fitting and decoration, property management, and hotel operations in a wide variety of global markets.

In 2005, Yang transferred his shares in Country Garden Holdings Company Limited to his daughter, Yang Huiyan. On April 20, 2007, Country Garden was listed on the Hong Kong Stock Exchange, and in October 2007, Yang Huiyan was declared the wealthiest woman in Asia by Forbes, with a net worth of US$16 billion.

In 2014, Country Garden was ranked the sixth largest property developer in China by sales revenue. On April 2, 2015, Chinese insurance giant Ping An became the second largest shareholder in Country Garden by acquiring 9.9 percent of the company for US$800 million.

In February 2020, in response to the COVID-19 pandemic, the Sydney office of a Country Garden subsidiary, Risland Australia, sourced eighty-two tonnes of supplies, which were subsequently airlifted to Wuhan. This daigou operation has caused concern that those activities of Chinese companies may have contributed to shortages of personal protective equipment products in Australia. In 2023, Country Garden joined the ranks of property companies such as Evergrande Group succumbing to the 2020–2023 Chinese property sector crisis. Following a series of credit rating downgrades and delayed bond coupons due to a liquidity crisis, the company missed US$15 million in payments in October 2023, triggering cross defaults in up to $11 billion of offshore bonds. It subsequently removed PwC as its financial auditor.

== Management ==
Yang Guoqiang (Yeung Kwok Keung, 楊國強) has been the actual controller of Country Garden since he founded the company.

In February 2023, due to age reasons, Yang Guoqiang resigned as chairman of the board. Yang Guoqiang's daughter Yang Huiyan, the firm's largest shareholder, succeeded as chairman. After the resignation, Yang Guoqiang kept the role of special adviser to the Cayman Island–registered company.

== Business strategy ==
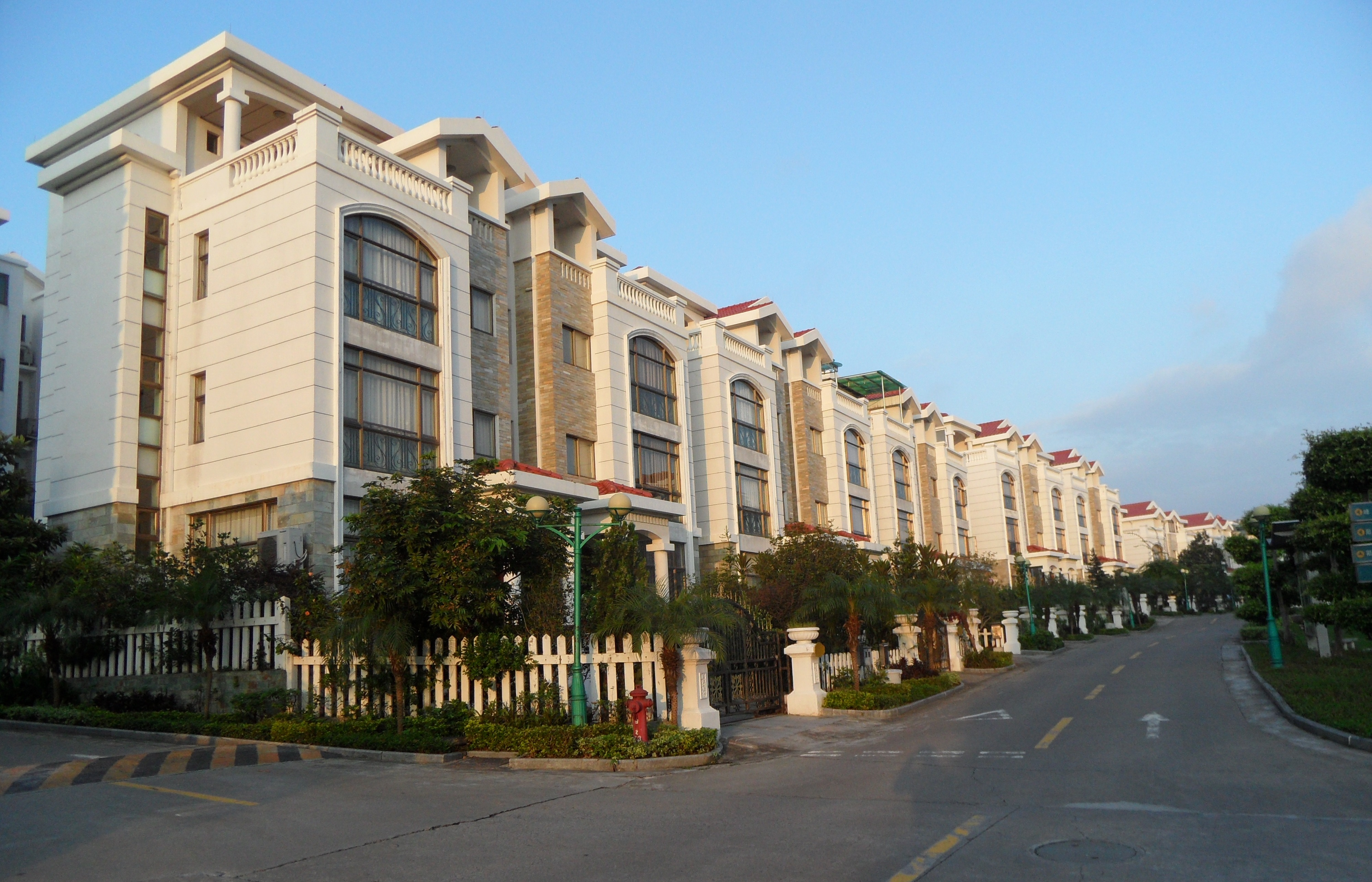
Residential buildings constructed by Country Garden in Guangdong Province, mainland China

Country Garden focuses on erecting residential properties in third- and fourth-tier cities in mainland China.

=== Rapid project development model ===
Country Garden follows a rapid build-and-sell model called the "456" project development model, by which they aim to complete a project within four months from land acquisition to launch; five months to collect payments from buyers; and six months to recover all costs associated with the investment. Their average time from land acquisition to launch is 5.2 months, making them one of the fastest builders in China.

=== Employee risk and profit sharing scheme ===
Country Garden implemented a profit-sharing model, whereby 20 percent of a project's net profit is awarded to general project managers and regional presidents if they meet targets. However, if there is a net loss, 20 percent of the loss is assumed by the managers until cash flow is corrected. This scheme has been successful in motivating employees and increasing sales.

=== Concentric Sharing ===
In 2014, Country Garden introduced the "Concentric Sharing" plan, which requires top leadership to invest their own money in projects. The plan involves creating a project company comprising all project members and senior management, which includes company directors, vice presidents, regional presidents, and project managers.

== Notable international developments ==
=== Country Garden Danga Bay ===
Country Garden's first venture outside of China is the Country Garden Danga Bay (CGDB) coastal development in Johor Bahru, Iskandar Malaysia, with a sales figure of US$1.57 billion (MYR5.0 billion) on the day of its official launch. Similarly, its second Malaysian project in Semenyih, Selangor, termed Country Garden Diamond City, had 70 percent of its total units for Phase 1 sold in early June 2014.

=== Forest City ===
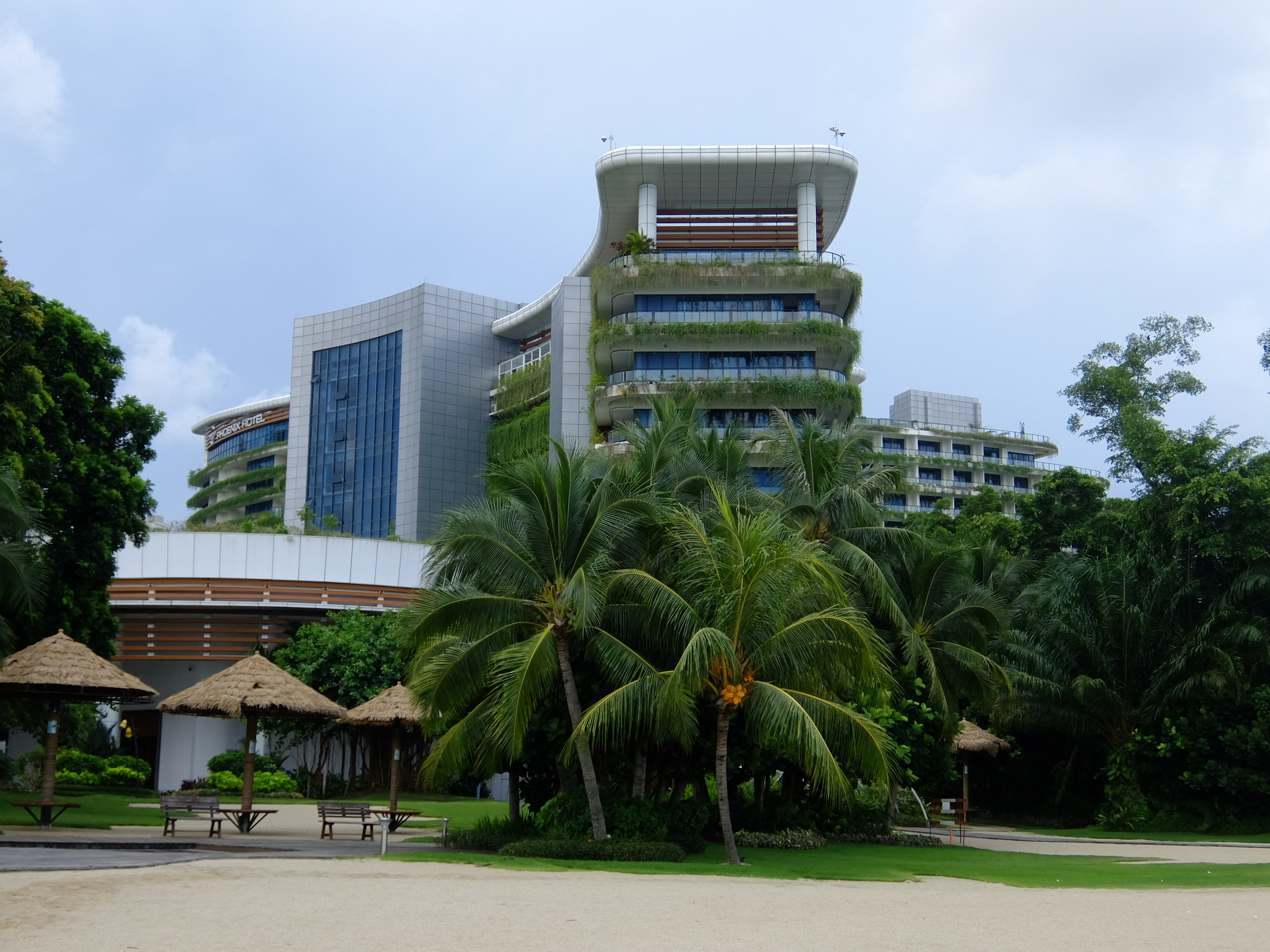
Forest City Phoenix International Marina Hotel

Forest City was planned as an integrated residential development, built on reclaimed land within the locale of Iskandar Puteri in Johor, Malaysia, in close proximity to the border with Singapore.

Forest City is a joint venture between Esplanade Danga 88, an affiliate of state government subsidiary Kumpulan Prasarana Rakyat Johor (KPRJ), through a joint venture, Country Garden Holding Ltd (CGPV), with CGPV holding 60 percent of shares and KPRJ the other 40 percent. The project encountered but managed to overcome initial environmental and political controversies. However, following the 2018 change in Malaysian government, COVID-19 pandemic and 2020–2023 Chinese property sector crisis, sales, construction progress and occupancy rates entered a steep decline. In September 2023, The Wall Street Journal published a report indicating that the occupancy rate of apartments within Forest City is notably low, with only approximately 9,000 residents inhabiting a development designed to accommodate up to 700,000 individuals. Furthermore, the commercial segments of the project have yet to show any indications of commencing operations, underscoring the overbuilding problem facing the project and Chinese property development companies.

=== Risland Australia ===
Risland Australia, Country Garden's overseas venture in Sydney, garnered strong sales, with 296 apartments at its Ryde Garden development sold within six hours in late June 2014, generating US$169 million (AUD180 million) in the process. In 2023 following Country Garden's bond default, the uncompleted project was sold to Frasers Property. At the point of sale, the 4,500-5,000 lot project remained largely unsold and lacked sewer and other infrastructure.

== Financial summary ==
Financial summary ended on 31 December (million RMB ≈ 0.14 million USD)
Year	2018	2019	2020	2021	2022	2023	
Year	2018	2019	2020	2021	2022	H1	H2
Revenue	379,079	485,908	462,856	523,064	430,371	226,309	
Profit/(loss)	48,542	61,202	54,118	40,982	(2,962)	(51,461)	

== Liquidity crisis (2020-2024) ==
There have been rumors about the financial health of Country Garden since the start of 2020–2023 Chinese property sector crisis. The valuation of its equities had witnessed a steep decline. In January 2023 the stock price had been HK$3.24 (equivalent to 41 U.S. cents). As the end of July 2023 approached, the company's share value had ebbed significantly, bottoming out at HK$1.58.

On August 7, 2023, Country Garden had two bond coupons denominated in U.S. dollars (approximately $22.5 million) that had expired and had not yet been paid. As of August 8, 2023, according to statements from investors based in Hong Kong, the company defaulted on the cumulative amount of US$45 million with regarding interest disbursements linked to two offshore U.S. dollar bonds. The company enjoyed a leeway of 30 days to effect the payments. Should it not meet these financial obligations within the aforementioned time limit, it would default on the stipulations contained in the bond agreements.

On 10 August 2023, Country Garden warned of a large net loss for the first six months of 2023 due to impairment on property projects and declining profit margins; the loss was expected to be in the range of CN¥ 45 billion(US$6.25 billion) to CN¥ 55 billion, after a net profit of around CN¥ 1.91 billion in the same period in 2022. The company's shares fell up to 14.4 percent to a record low on the day following the profit warning, closing below HK$ 1 for the first time. The same day, Country Garden appointed China International Capital Corporation (CICC), as its financial advisor to handle the restructuring of its public market debt, with preliminary decisions expected to be made in the near term. On August 12, 2023, Country Garden Real Estate Group announced the suspension of trading for eleven onshore bonds on the Shenzhen Stock Exchange and Shanghai Stock Exchange starting August 14, following its controlling shareholders' disclosure of a significant first-half loss. This decision affects multiple yuan-denominated corporate bonds issued in 2021 and 2022, with discussions about restructuring due to liquidity challenges. The company's bonds have faced a sharp decline in value since August 2023, prompting discussions with bondholders about repayment arrangements and potential solutions to address financial difficulties. On September 5, 2023, the company paid offshore U.S. dollar bond interest within the grace period.

In October 2023, the company's Australian branch, Risland Australia, sold the 366 hectare (904 acre) Windermere project in Victoria state to Frasers Property and also announced plans to sell its $2 billion Wilton Greens estate in Wollondilly Shire south-west of Sydney, after it began defaulting on offshore debts for the first time. In October 2023, the company failed to pay US$15 million in U.S. dollar-denominated bond, triggering cross defaults in up to $11 billion of offshore bonds.

Despite initially missing an interest payment worth approximately 66 million yuan on onshore bonds in May 2024, Country Garden was able to pay within the grace period.

== Controversies ==
In June 2018, Country Garden halted all projects in China for security inspections following an accident at its construction site in the eastern province of Anhui that killed six people. In August 2018, Malaysia's Prime Minister Mahathir Mohamad reportedly said he intends to ban foreigners from buying homes being built by Country Garden in the southern tip of the country.

In October 2019, Country Garden, via Walker Corporation, was given the approval to develop stage one of South East Wilton in Sydney Australia. This is controversial because the eastern side of the site will cut Koala corridors along Allens Creek. The Greater Macarthur area, of which South East Wilton is the most southern section, is home to the largest recovering Koala colony in New South Wales.

== See also ==
- Real estate in China
- Evergrande Group
