= Active Minds =

Nonprofit mental health organization

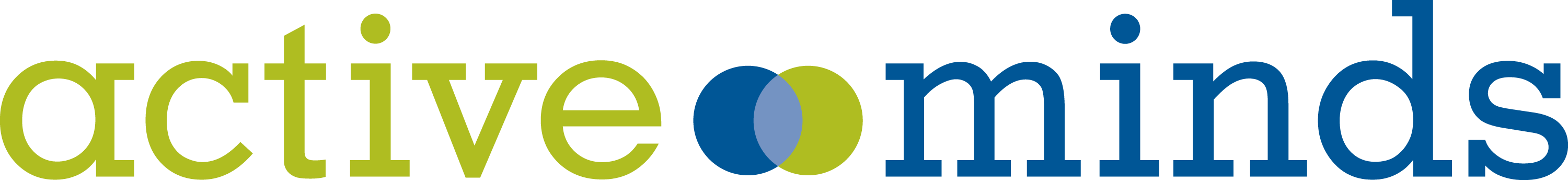
- Formation: June 2003
- Founder: Alison Malmon
- Type: Not-for-profit 501(c)(3)
- Purpose: Mental health promotion, suicide prevention
- Headquarters: Washington DC, United States
- Executive Director: Alison Malmon
- Website: http://www.activeminds.org/

Active Minds is an American nonprofit organization dedicated to promoting mental health, especially among young adults, via peer-to-peer dialogue and interaction. Active Minds was founded by Alison Malmon in 2003, after her older brother died by suicide in 2000.

Active Minds has over 600 chapters and offers programs focused on mental health awareness and education. These include Send Silence Packing, a traveling suicide prevention exhibit; Active Minds Speakers, a group of presenters who provide mental health education; the Healthy Campus Award, which recognizes colleges prioritizing student well-being; and Active Minds @Work, which works to build a mental health culture in the workplace.

== History ==
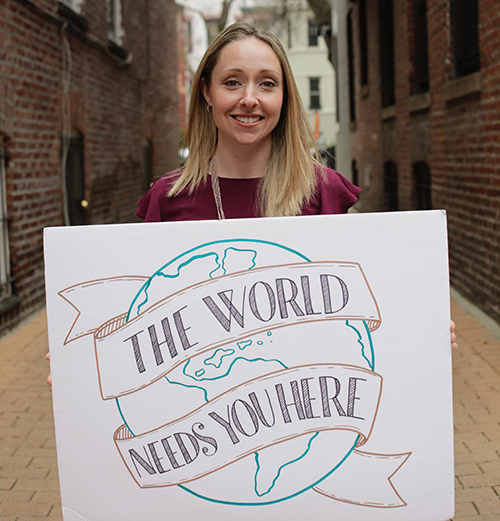
Alison Malmon, founder and executive director

Alison Malmon launched the first student-led chapter of what would become Active Minds in her junior year at the University of Pennsylvania, after the death of her brother. Brian Malmon was a student at Columbia University where he was a member of the Dean's list, and was a leader in many extracurricular activities. However, he was suffering from what was later diagnosed as schizoaffective disorder. After his death, many friends claimed that they had noticed changes in Brian, but were not sure what to say or how to approach the situation, and therefore did nothing. This silence and lack of awareness is what prompted Malmon to start Active Minds.

The organization, originally called "Open Minds", was dedicated to increasing awareness about mental illness. In 2003, when Malmon graduated, she launched Active Minds, Inc as a 501(c)(3) organization. She became the youngest person to receive the Tipper Gore Remember the Children Award from the National Mental Health Association.

== Programs ==
Active Minds primarily operates through peer-to-peer methods, supported by their chapter network in high schools, colleges, and universities. They also provide various nationwide programs for students, workplace professionals, and organizations of any size.

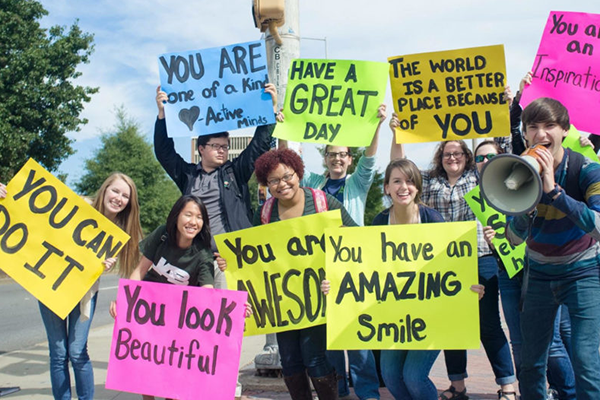
Members of an Active Minds chapter advocating for mental health

Active Minds has over 600 student-led chapters, both across the United States and elsewhere. Each year, thousands of students join an Active Minds chapter as advocates, stigma fighters, and educators for mental health.

Transform Your Campus is an Active Minds program for student leaders featuring guides on how to implement advocacy campaigns on campuses. Campaign initiatives include adding mental health crisis numbers to student IDs, improving campus leave of absence policies, and reducing the rate of deaths by suicide by limiting access to fatal methods.

Active Minds K-12 initiatives aim to mobilize and empower youth and young adults to change the conversation about mental health and engage in proven peer-to-peer approaches in their schools. These initiatives include the Active Minds Mental Health Advocacy Academy, the Your Voice is Your Power campaign, and K-12-specific mental health resources.

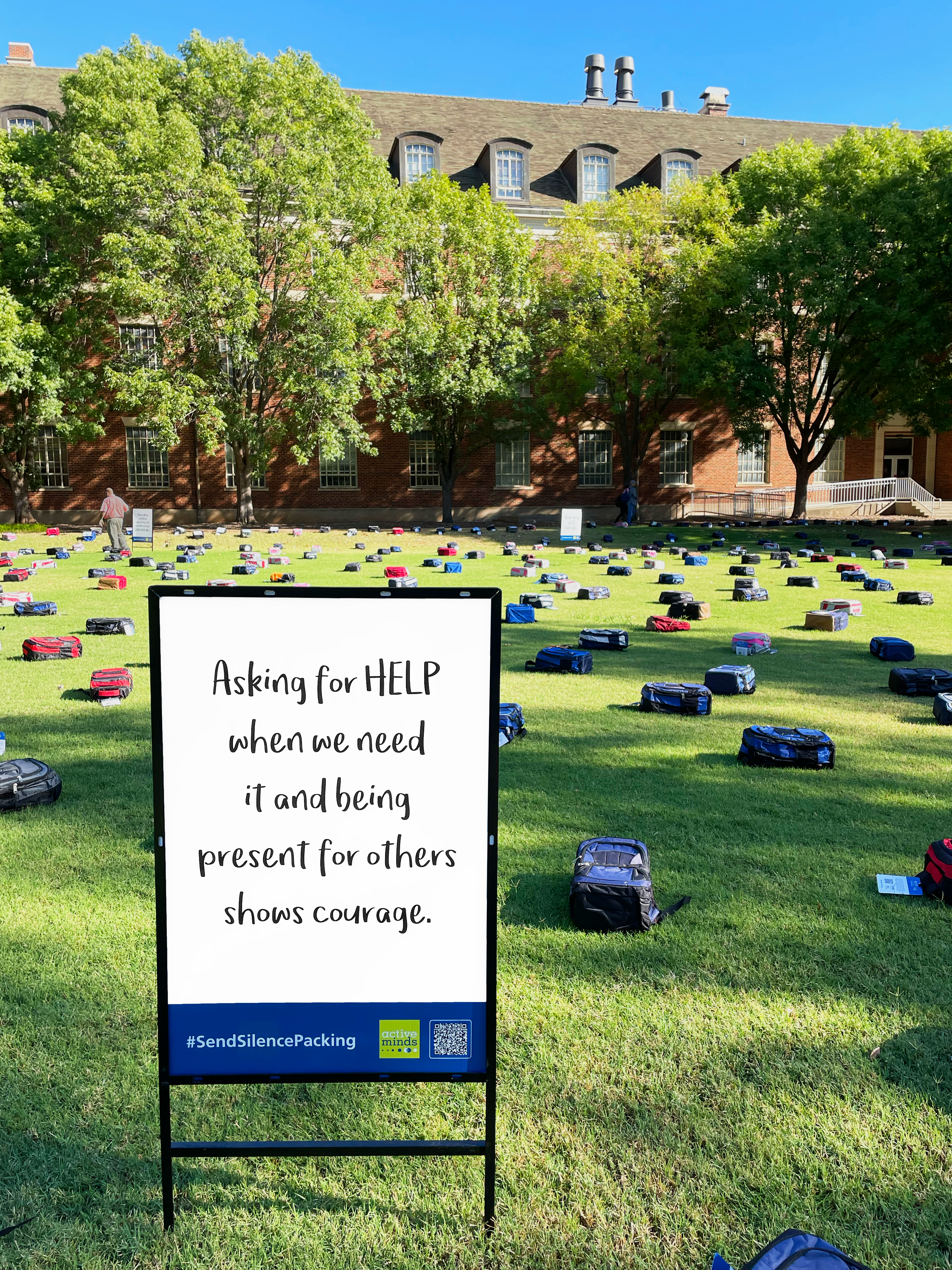
A local Active Minds chapter hosting Send Silence Packing

Since 2004, a national conference brings together young adults and mental health leaders; campus and school professionals; government, foundation, and corporate representatives to share ideas and advance knowledge about mental health education, advocacy, and awareness. The conference annually showcases the most innovative and effective approaches to supporting young adult well-being and changing the conversation about mental health on campuses, in workplaces, and within our communities.

Active Minds @Work offers tools for the next generation of employees and employers, designed to improve the culture of mental health in high-performing environments.

=== Send Silence Packing ===
In 2008, Active Minds held the first Send Silence Packing display at the National Mall in Washington DC. The display consists of 1,000 backpacks laid on the ground in a public space, with personal stories attached. These backpacks represent the lives of the over 1,000 college students that are lost to suicide each year. The Send Silence Packing tour now travels nationwide in the fall and spring of each year.

== Other initiatives and awards ==
The Active Minds Emerging Scholars Fellowship provides an opportunity for students to complete funded, independent mental health projects and to be connected with a network of young scholars and national experts in the field of behavioral health.

The Active Minds Healthy Campus Award recognizes U.S. colleges and universities that are prioritizing health and making significant progress toward creating a campus that promotes mental health, physical health, and well-being of its students. The award was established in 2016 and is supported by Peg's Foundation.

In 2025, The MIND club (Mental Health Needs Discussion) at the University of South Carolina launched the "USC Speak Your Mind Challenge", a revival of the 2014 Ice Bucket Challenge. While the original challenge raised awareness about and funds for treatment of ALS, this challenge raises awareness about mental health and advocates for suicide prevention with funds going to the Active Minds non-profit.

== Impact studies ==
Following Active Minds' spring 2020 survey (The Impact of COVID-19 on Student Mental Health), another survey was conducted to see the ways that COVID-19 had impacted students' mental health six months later. Active Minds surveyed over 2,000 students during fall 2020 to better understand the continued toll of the pandemic on students. Two thirds of students (66.89%) reported an increase in supporting others with their mental wellness. Respondents reported having received information from their institution regarding mental health (66.41%), academic policies (82.5%), and healthy coping strategies (49.15%).

Active Minds surveyed 3,239 high school and higher education students between April 10–18, 2020 regarding the impact of COVID-19 on their mental health. 80% of college students report that COVID-19 has negatively impacted their mental health. Additionally, research revealed that Despite COVID-19, 79% of college students feel hopeful about achieving their school-related goals and their future job prospects.

A study done across 12 California colleges found that increased awareness of Active Minds led to an increase in perceived knowledge about mental health related issues and in helping behaviors. It also led to a decrease in stigma. This study had limitations, however, as it was done on a convenience sample, so the students involved may have been more involved in Active Minds than an average student.

Another study included 70,000 students at colleges that participated in a Healthy Minds Survey. In this study, Active Minds was found to lower the stigma felt (both on a personal and public level), increase knowledge about resources and services, improve attitudes toward medications, and lower levels of depression and anxiety. The study did suggest, however, that Active Minds may not have an increasing effect on already positive mental health. This study was limited by its large sample size, which made significant results more likely.
