= Evergrande (disambiguation) =

The Evergrande Group is a Chinese property developer.

Evergrande may also refer to:

== Sport ==
- Guangzhou F.C., formerly known as Guangzhou Evergrande Football Club
  - Guangzhou Evergrande Football Stadium, a stadium under construction in Guangzhou
- Evergrande Football School in Qingyuan
- Guangdong Evergrande Volleyball Club (Women) in Shenzhen

== Buildings ==
- Evergrande Center, a skyscraper under construction in Shenzhen
- Evergrande International Financial Center T1, a skyscraper in Hefei whose construction is on hold

== Other ==
- Evergrande New Energy Auto, an automobile manufacturer owned by Evergrande Group
