= Chinese real estate crisis (2020–present) =

Financial crisis

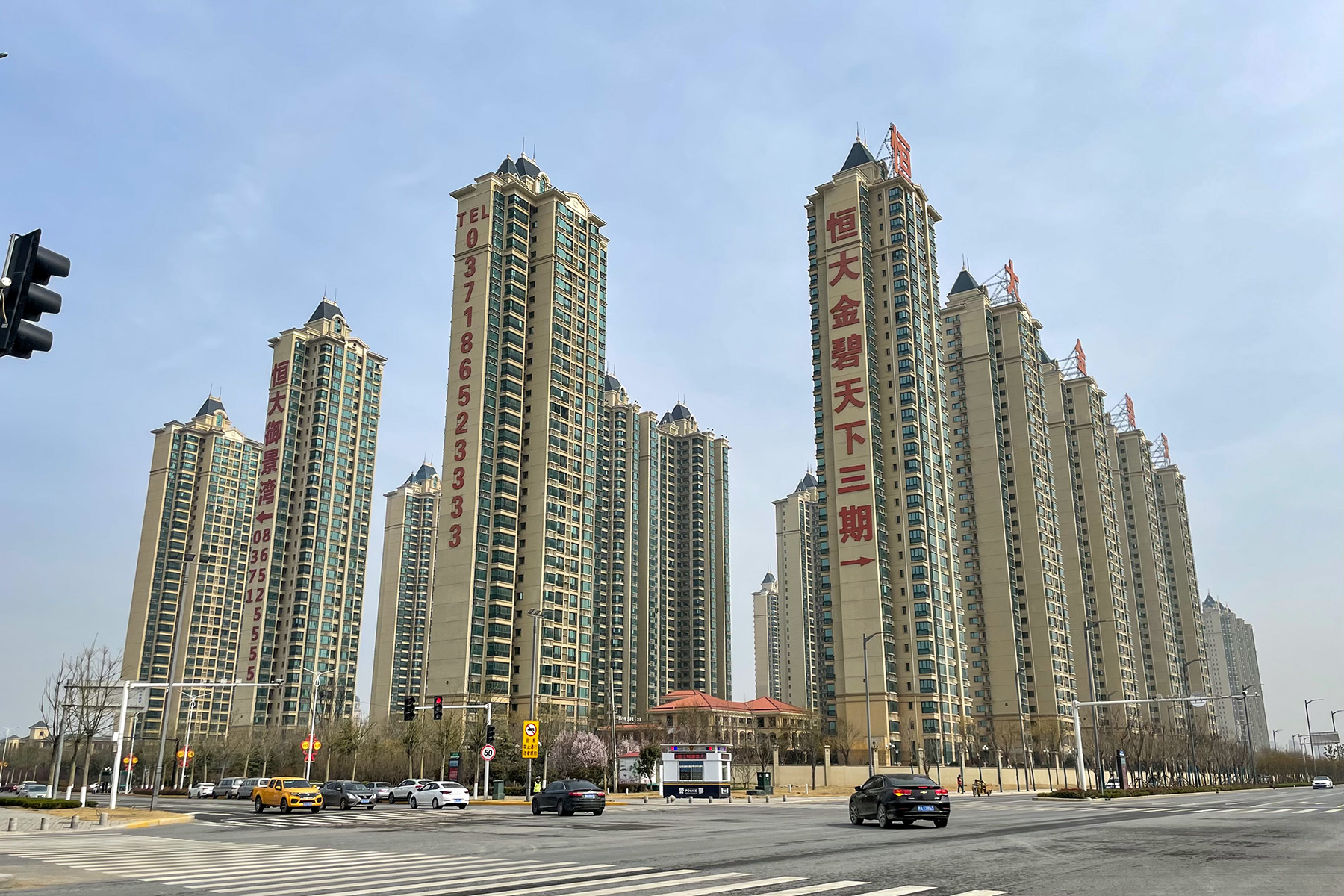
Residential buildings developed by Evergrande in Yuanyang County, Henan

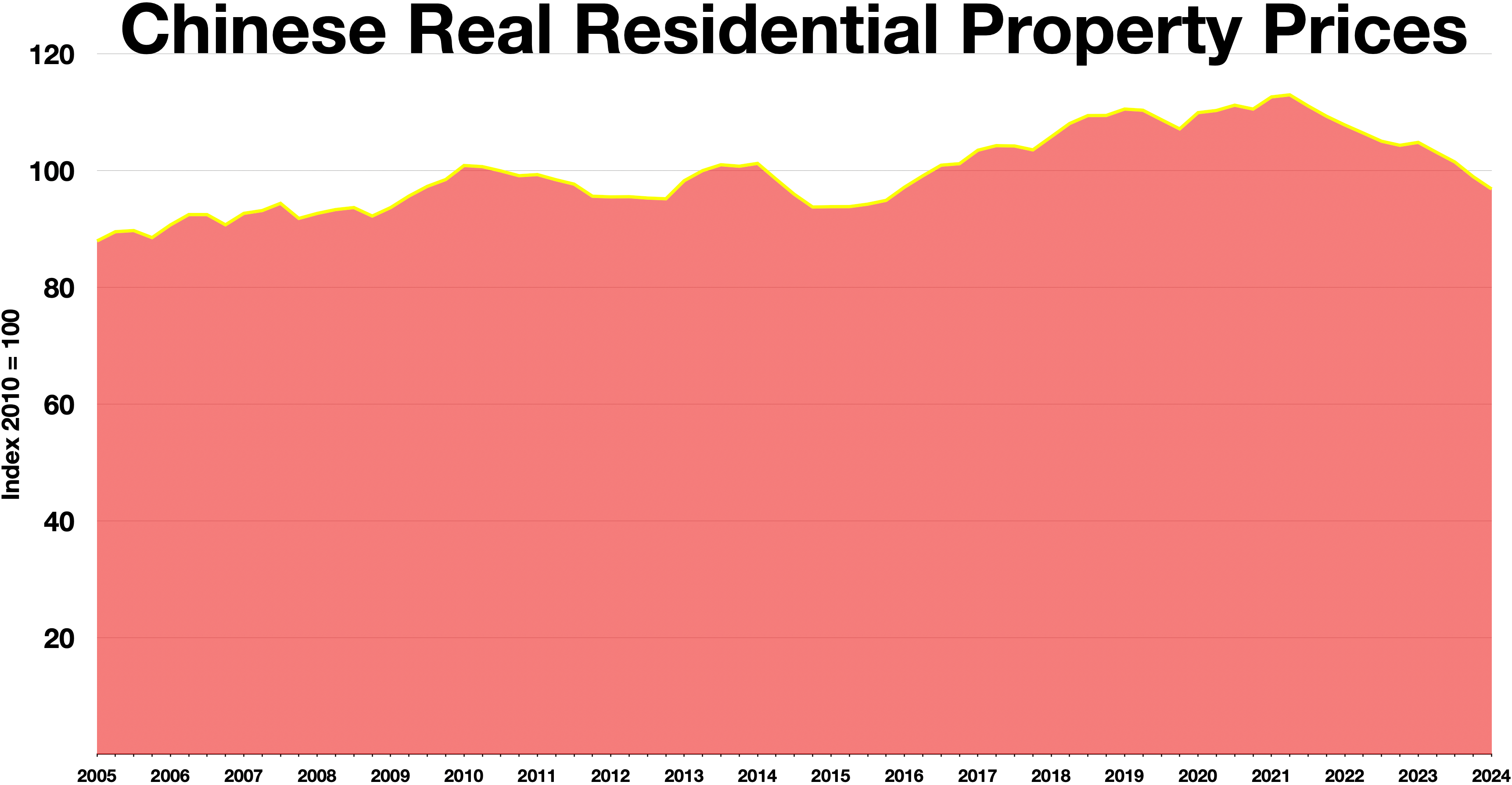
Chinese real residential property prices

The Chinese real estate crisis is an ongoing financial crisis sparked by the 2021 default of Evergrande Group. Evergrande, along with other Chinese property developers, experienced financial stress in the wake of overbuilding and subsequent new Chinese regulations on these companies' debt limits. The crisis spread beyond Evergrande in 2021 to such major property developers as Country Garden, Kaisa Group, Fantasia Holdings, Sunac, Sinic Holdings, and Modern Land.

Following widespread online sharing of a letter in August 2021, in which Evergrande warned the Guangdong government that it was at risk of experiencing a cash crunch, shares plunged, impacting global markets and leading to a slowdown of foreign investment in China. The company unsuccessfully attempted to sell assets to generate money, missed several debt payments, was downgraded by international ratings agencies and finally defaulted on an offshore bond at the beginning of December 2021. The ratings agency Fitch declared the company to be in "restricted default".

At the beginning of the 2020s, thousands of retail investors, as well as banks, suppliers, and foreign investors were owed 2 trillion RMB (310 billion USD) by Evergrande alone. On 29 January 2024, a Hong Kong court ordered Evergrande to be liquidated.

== Background ==
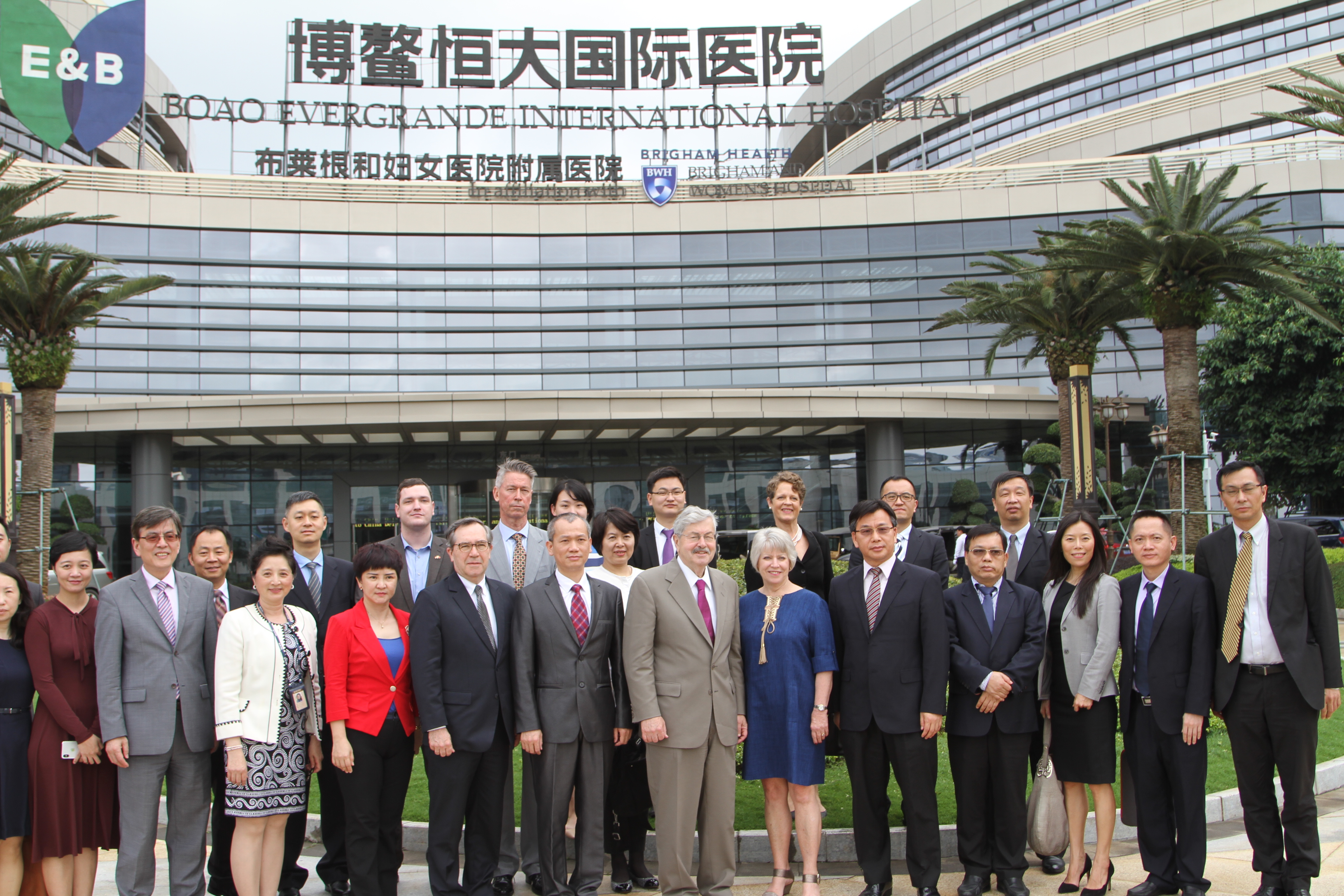
American Ambassador to China Terry Branstad visiting a Bo'ao hospital jointly established by Evergrande and Brigham and Women's Hospital, 2018

=== 2000s and 2010s ===
In 2005, the Chinese property bubble was growing. Average land values in China tripled by 2009, and continued to 2011, when values temporarily stopped growing. Due to fiscal reforms from previous decades, local governments had become increasingly reliant on infrastructure development to earn revenue, through local government financing vehicles. Due to the financial benefits of selling land use rights, land value became central to the financial security of local governments. The 2008 financial crisis was addressed largely through local government investment in infrastructure, which further contributed to a reliance on increasing land value, despite accumulating larger and larger debts.

Between its 2009 initial public offering and 2017 the stock price of the second largest property developer in China, Evergrande Group had outpaced the 30% growth rate of the Hang Seng Index, having multiplied eightfold and it had become the world's most indebted property group in the process. By 2018, the central government was so concerned by the size of local government debts from land development that they announced they would not bail out creditors who were not able to be repaid.

=== "Three red lines" rule, 2020 ===
In 2020, Chinese Communist Party (CCP) general secretary Xi Jinping's leadership started to tighten the real estate market based on the principle that "houses are for living, not for speculation." He had previously made this statement during the 19th CCP Congress and it became the basis of the three red lines rule. The rule regulated the leverage taken on by developers, limiting their borrowing based on the following metrics: debt-to-cash, debt-to-equity, and debt-to-assets.

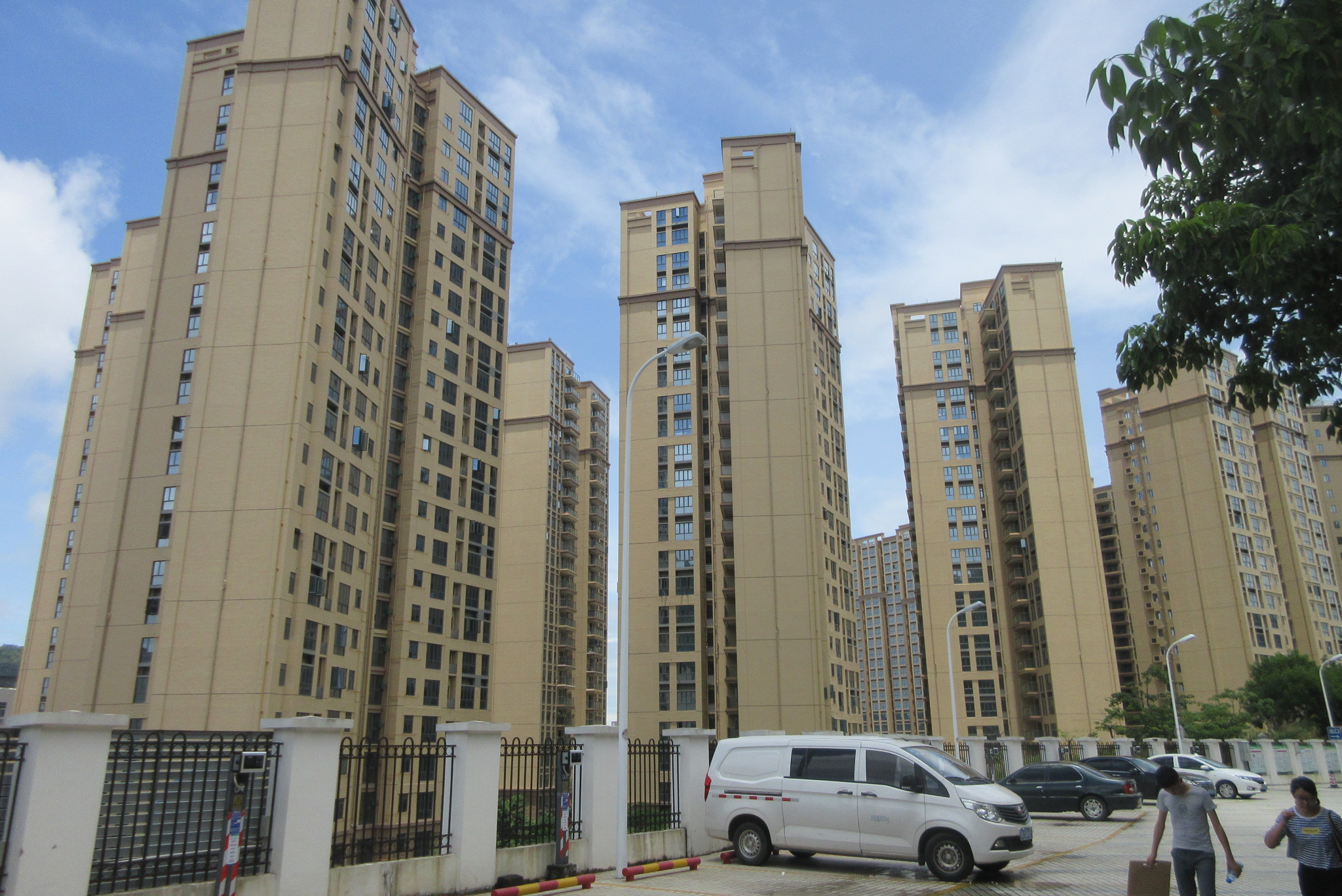
Housing development in Shenzhen

Evergrande crossed all three red lines, resulting in a liquidity crisis and its later insolvency. Evergrande had leveraged itself heavily before 2020, which meant the three red lines rule was supposed to have a major impact on their borrowing. The Financial Times cited the director of S&P Global Ratings, saying that Evergrande was "so highly leveraged, it's likely to breach all of the alleged thresholds". In 2020, many analysts considered Evergrande as "too big to fail." It was thought that a Lehman-Brothers–style collapse could have massive consequences on the Chinese economy and the world at large. Evergrande's land reserves alone were large enough to house 10 million people in 2020.

=== Evergrande's diversification strategy ===
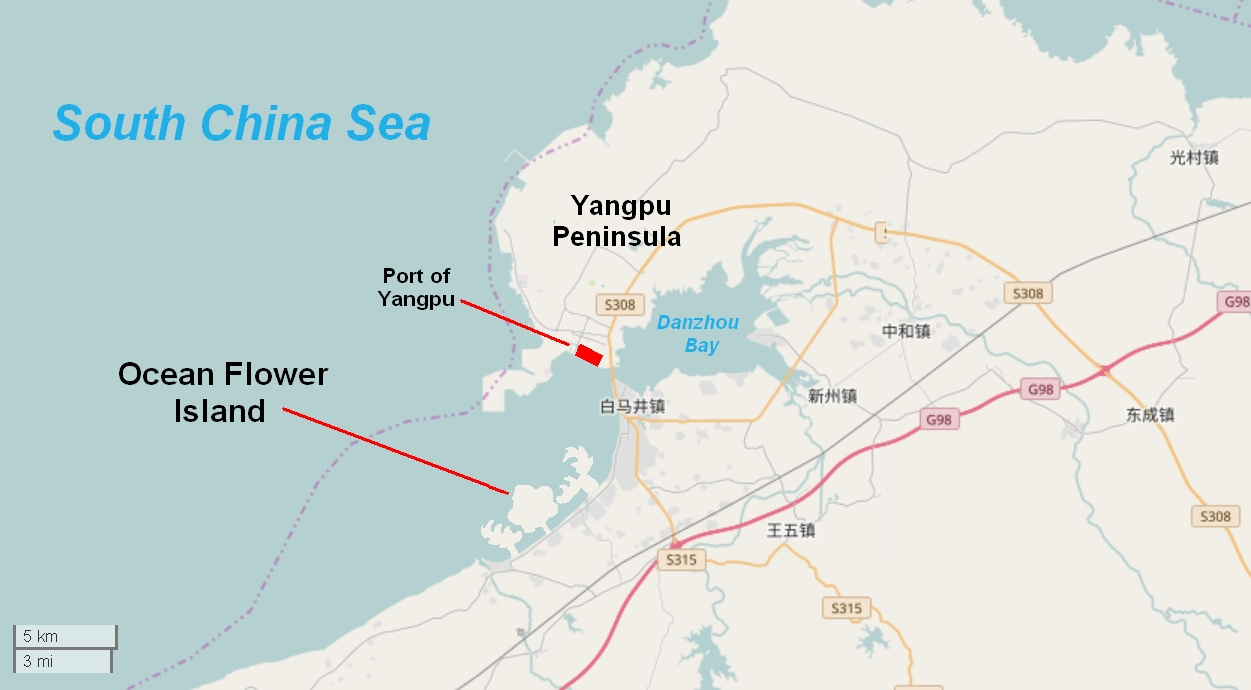
Ocean Flower Island on the north shore of Hainan near Yangpu in the South China Sea

In the years preceding the 2021 crisis, Evergrande had pursued an aggressive expansion, including ventures in electric vehicles, theme parks, energy, and many other sectors. These leveraged investments included Ocean Flower Island, a 100 billion RMB (US$15.5 billion) project to build an artificial island on the north shore of Hainan near Yangpu in the South China Sea, plans to spend over 45 billion RMB (US$7 billion) between 2019 and 2021 in electric vehicle development, and ownership of Guangzhou F.C., China's richest football club.

=== Evergrande wealth management products ===
The Financial Times reported that "Evergrande used retail financial investments to plug funding gaps". The company raised billions of dollars through wealth management products and used the money to plug holes in its own funding and to repay other wealth product investors. The products sold were highly risky, with an anonymous executive suggesting they were "too risky for retail investors and should not have been offered to them". They were marketed widely. Evergrande managers, for instance, pressured subordinates to purchase products advertised at over 10% annual return. Total wealth management product liabilities stood at 40 billion RMB in September 2021.

Referred to as a type of supply chain finance, investors would invest money in shell companies they falsely believed existed to supplement working capital. As sales of the products fell, their business model became unsustainable. An Evergrande executive was quoted in 2021 as saying "Many people ... might be arrested for financial fraud if investors don't get paid off. Our products were not for everyone. But our grassroots salespeople didn't consider this when making their sales pitches and they targeted everyone in order to meet their own sales targets." Other Chinese companies that sold wealth management products included Baoneng, Country Garden, Sunac, and Kaisa.

== 2021 ==
=== Regulations ===
In 2021, other central and local government regulations, including mortgage lending limits, rent caps in big cities, and land auction cancellations, caused a slowdown in the property sector, as authorities attempted to control rising house prices.

In 2021, new regulations prohibited financial institutions from providing fresh liquidity to local government financing vehicles. Following these regulations, local governments are required to raise funds through issuing bonds, subjecting them to stronger oversight.

While Evergrande had announced in March 2021 that it was looking to cut its debt load by 150 billion RMB (US$23.3 billion), it was still expanding, having launched 63 new projects in the first half of 2021. By 8 October 2021, 14 of China's 30 biggest developers had violated the three lines regulations at least once. Guangzhou R&F violated all three regulations; Evergrande and Greenland Holdings violated two regulations; and Aoyuan, CIFI Holdings, Country Garden, Greentown, Jiangsu Zhongnan, Risesun, Seazen Holdings, Shinsun Holdings, Sunac, Sunshine City Group, and Zhenro Group violated one of the regulations. The developers mentioned had total sales in 2020 of over 4.34 trillion RMB (US$672 billion).

=== Western exposure to Evergrande ===
In 2021, Evergrande was estimated to have $19 billion in overseas liabilities. American and European companies had significant exposure to Evergrande through their holding of corporate bonds. Ashmore Group, an emerging market specialist, owned more than $400 million at the end of June, while UBS owned over $300 million. BlackRock had a total exposure of $400 million across all its funds, with one of its high-yield funds having acquired an additional $18 million worth of bonds in August. Other companies had smaller exposure, with HSBC having a peak exposure of $31 million.

=== Impending default of Evergrande ===
==== Downgrading of credit ratings ====
On 22 June 2021, Fitch downgraded Evergrande's credit rating from B+ to B, and further downgraded it to CCC+ on 28 July. According to the company, the initial downgrade reflected "ongoing pressure for Evergrande to downsize its business and reduce total debt", the latter action due to "Evergrande's diminishing margin of safety in preserving liquidity".

On 3 August 2021, Moody's downgraded Evergrande's rating from B2 to Caa1. On 5 August, S&P Global Ratings downgraded Evergrande and its subsidiaries from B− to CCC, two steps on its scale, qualifying it as having extremely speculative credit worthiness. On 7 September, Fitch downgraded Evergrande further from CCC+ to CC.

==== August letter ====
In the last week of August 2021, a letter became widely circulated online. In the letter, Evergrande informed the government of Guangdong province that they were close to running out of cash. Initially, the company claimed that the letter was fabricated. Evergrande denounced the letter as "pure defamation", and made a number of public announcements to reduce fears from investors and the public.

In a statement on 31 August 2021, Evergrande warned it would default on its debts if it failed to raise enough cash to cover them. At the time, Evergrande was China's most indebted real estate developer, and had several large bond payments to make for the foreseeable future. On 31 August, Evergrande filed for US bankruptcy protection.

==== Chinese government responses ====
On 22 September 2021, the governments in Zhuhai and Nanshan District, Shenzhen took control of sales revenue for Evergrande's properties in a state-controlled custodial account to protect home-buyers and continue construction of the company's developments. Various provinces followed suit as the developer put hundreds of projects on hold.

In October 2021, The Wall Street Journal reported that the central government was planning to implement a nationwide property tax, to tackle real estate speculation. However, the report detailed widespread resistance within the Chinese Communist Party (CCP), leading to an alternative proposal to provide state-owned housing. On 23 October, a five-year trial of the proposed tax was announced for select regions with high real estate prices, most likely Shenzhen, Hangzhou and Hainan.

==== Missed payments in September ====
On 24 September 2021, Evergrande missed off-shore bond payments totalling US$83.5 million. While the company had 30 days to avoid defaulting on the debt, analysts felt it was unlikely to manage doing so. On 12 October, Evergrande missed payments on three offshore bonds which totalled US$148 million. By this date, the developer had missed five bond payments during the crisis. On 20 October, Evergrande paid off US$83.5 million worth of interest in order to avoid a default on the 24 September bonds.

==== Evergrande's attempted asset sales ====
In order to raise capital, the group started to sell off some of its assets. On 29 September 2021, the company sold a 20% stake in Shengjing Bank, retaining 15%, raising 10 billion RMB (US$1.5 billion). On 4 October 2021, the Cailian Press reported that rival Hopson Development was set to buy a 51% stake in the Evergrande Property Services subsidiary for around US$5 billion. On the same day, Evergrande froze its shares on the Hong Kong Stock Exchange, citing a "possible general offer" in the near future, but until 20 October had not unfrozen them nor made announcements about the offer.

On 20 October, they announced that the deal had fallen through and applied to reopen trading on its shares. Except for a stake in a regional bank, as of that date "there has been no material progress on sale of assets of the group" according to Evergrande. In response, shares fell 13.6%.

=== Financial contagion ===
Off-shore bondholders hired Kirkland & Ellis and Moelis & Company to advise them ahead of a potential restructuring in September. In the second week of October 2021, they informed the bondholders that they expected an Evergrande default to be "imminent" and that the company had failed to engage with them "meaningfully".

On 28 September 2021, Sunac bought back $34 million of its bonds and denied requesting government assistance. A letter, which the developer claimed was merely a draft, surfaced online arguing that recent regulations in Shaoxing intended to control property prices had left a local project unable to break even.

On 5 October 2021, developer Fantasia Holdings missed a payment on a US$206 million bond that had matured the day before, triggering a default. Just weeks prior, the developer had assured investors it had "no liquidity issue".

On 7 October 2021, Chinese Estates Holdings announced they would go private in order to avoid contagion from a possible Evergrande default.

On 11 October 2021, developer Sinic Holdings Group Co. warned that it was unlikely to be able to pay off a US$250 million bond due on 18 October 2021. At the time of the announcement, Sinic had US$694 million of dollar bonds outstanding.

In the week of 11 October 2021, Modern Land attempted to extend the maturity of a US$250 million bond on Monday and the prices of Sunac and Guangzhou R&F bonds fell sharply.

On 15 October, the Chinese government commented for the first time on the Evergrande situation, blaming the company for its problems and saying that financial contagion was controllable.

On 19 October 2021, Sinic defaulted on US$246 million worth of bonds. The same day, official figures showed real estate output in China was down 1.6% in the third quarter year on year, the first time it has been negative since the start of the pandemic.

On 20 October 2021, the National Bureau of Statistics of China published data indicating that home prices had fallen month-on-month for the first time since April 2015, dropping in more than half of the cities surveyed.

In addition, the Chinese shadow banks, such as Sichuan Trust, have been greatly affected by the property sector crisis due to over lending and a crackdown on regulations.

=== Evergrande default ===
In November, it was reported that the Chinese government was working behind closed doors to restructure Evergrande, in order to resolve the crisis.

On 10 November 2021, Evergrande defaulted on three additional bonds after missing the grace period for interest payments, but reportedly fulfilled the payments after the deadline.

On 19 November 2021, it was announced that Hong Kong's Hang Seng China Enterprises Index delisted Evergrande Group. Reasons why companies are delisted are typically not given by the index. Any delisting is likely due to the poor performance of the company since the crisis began.

On 7 December 2021, it was reported that Evergrande had for the first time missed a deadline for payment of interest on US dollar bonds at the end of a 30-day grace period, with no sign of payment. A day later, trading in shares of the similarly embattled Chinese property developer Kaisa Group Holdings was suspended after an anonymous source said that Kaisa would probably not meet a deadline for $400 million offshore debt. In early December 2021, Kaisa was the second-largest holder (after Evergrande) of offshore debt among developers.

The ratings agency Fitch further downgraded Evergrande Group and Kaisa on 9 December 2021 from "C" to "RD", thereby declaring that both groups had defaulted on offshore bonds. Fitch attached a so-called "restricted default" status to this downgrade. Neither developer had yet officially announced defaults that could lead to debt restructuring processes. On 10 December 2021, a third party forcibly sold about 3.4% of Chairman Hui Ka Yan's personal holding of Evergrande stock to enforce a "security interest" (the shares had been pledged). On 17 December 2021, credit rating agency S&P Global declared Evergrande in "selective default" with regard to payments for outstanding US-dollar bonds.

==== Demolition notice ====
On 27 December 2021, the People's Government of Danzhou issued a notice asking Evergrande to demolish 39 of the buildings on its Ocean Flower Island, or Haihua Island, project, which is off the coast of Danzhou City, Hainan. The government stated that these buildings were built illegally. With an 8-square-kilometer planned area and an investment of roughly 81 billion yuan, Haihua Island would have been the world's largest artificial island. It was also Evergrande's most influential real estate project before the financial crisis. The order further undermined market confidence in Beijing's proposal to allow Evergrande to sell its assets to satisfy its debts.

== 2022 ==
Trading of Evergrande's shares was halted on 3 January 2022. In a filing submitted the next day, Evergrande committed to trading again in the future, but noted that its 2021 sales were 43.02 billion yuan ($7 billion), down 39% from 2020.

As concern over the state of the Chinese economy and its dependence on loans increased, Chinese banks decreased their traditional lending activity and purchasing low-risk financial instruments to meet government-imposed lending quotas. On 20 February 2022, various Evergrande contractors reported that assets worth over US$150 million had been frozen on orders of Chinese courts.

On 23 February 2022, Marco Metzler stated that Evergrande could no longer be successfully restructured, based on an analysis by ratings agency Fitch. In this analysis, a liquidation of the company would return only between 0% and 10% of principal to creditors. Metzler was Chairman of FMPC Consulting, who advised Evergrande creditors on possible insolvency proceedings with respect to Evergrande's Cayman Islands subsidiary.

On 15 March 2022, Evergrande's share price sank to a new all-time low of HK$1.16 (US$0.15), down from a high of over HK$31 in October 2017.

On 17 March 2022, stocks of Sunac, China's third-biggest property developer by sales, were downgraded to a B− credit rating by ratings agency S&P, because of concerns that the company might not be able to meet its very large debt repayments of nearly US$4bn for 2022. The company's liquidity position was revised downward from "less than adequate" to "weak" by the ratings agency.

On 22 March 2022, Evergrande said that it would delay the release of its financial results for 2021 due to "ongoing audit work"; in that week, about 13.4 billion yuan (US$2.11 billion) in deposits were seized by banks from its property services unit Evergrande Property Services Group because the money had been pledged as security for third-party guarantees.

Evergrande promised but failed to deliver a preliminary debt restructuring plan by 31 July 2022. Instead, the company offered details on "preliminary restructuring principles" for its offshore debt; Evergrande added that it aimed for "a specific offshore restructuring plan within 2022." On 2 September 2022, a Hong Kong High Court judge rescheduled to 7 November 2022 legal proceedings to wind up China Evergrande Group, in order to give the company time to formulate a restructuring plan.

Chinese homebuyers started boycotting mortgage payments in the middle of 2022. Data from the website "WeNeedHome" showed that homebuyers were boycotting payments for 343 projects in mid-September 2022. This was an increase from 318 projects in early July.

== 2023 ==
In early 2023, the government began to soften its approach to the three red lines in an effort to increase market confidence.

=== Background on Chinese real estate market ===
Property sales remained slow into 2023. According to one senior economist, sales were slowed by a property price floor imposed by the government to prevent developers from cutting prices. However, at the same time, the government was discussing a proposal to introduce a property tax, which had the potential to resolve local government debt problems, but which could reduce land value by 50%. In April, the government completed a unified real estate registration tax system, which would enable the property tax to be implemented.

By June, there were reports that property developers were using incentives such as cars and mobile phones to promote apartment sales. Huafa Tianfu, a developer in Hangzhou, offered up to 1 kg of gold as a reward for buying an apartment (450,000 yuan, around 18% of the apartment's value).

Sales by the top 100 developers in mainland China had fallen by about 33 per cent year on year in July 2023, according to China property consultancy CRIC. According to analysts, a rise in default by "Shadow banks" (as trust companies are also known) with strong ties to the Chinese property sector would add pressure to the real estate sector in China. Bloomberg Economics estimated that the trust sector's exposure to real estate was around 10% of total assets.

In August 2023, it was estimated that there were 60 to 80 million empty apartments in China. Referring to properties marketed by Evergrande, Anne Stevenson-Yang of J Capital Research opined in summer 2023 that many such properties in the past were "sold as a speculative investment, not sold as a place to live, so obviously the confidence game will only work as long as people keep buying."

=== Evergrande bankruptcy and arrest of its chairman ===
On 17 July 2023, Evergrande made public that it had made a net loss attributable to shareholders of 476 billion yuan (US$66.3 billion) for 2021 and of 105.9 billion yuan (US$14.7 billion) for 2022. The group stated that its total liabilities on 31 December 2022 stood at 2.43 trillion yuan (roughly US$340 billion), up from 2 trillion yuan in September 2021. Court hearings on the restructuring of the group's debts were to be held in July 2023 in Hong Kong and the Caribbean.

In a New York court on 18 August 2023, Evergrande filed for bankruptcy protection under chapter 15 of the US bankruptcy code, which protects its US assets while it attempts a restructuring deal. On 28 August 2023, Evergrande stock plunged in Hong Kong as trading resumed after a 17-month suspension, tumbling by 79 per cent to 35 HK cents, as opposed to the pre-suspension price of HK$1.65 on 21 March 2022. The record stock price in October 2017 had been over HK$31.

Hui Ka Yan, the chairman of the board and Communist Party secretary of the Evergrande Group, was put under "mandatory measures" (a kind of detention by the authorities) for suspected illegal activities on 28 September 2023. The Wall Street Journal reported that he was suspected of transferring assets offshore while it was still unclear whether the indebted property developer would be able to complete all its unfinished projects. Several important figures from Evergrande were also arrested in the preceding days.

On 4 December 2023, a Hong Kong court granted Evergrande Group another reprieve by adjourning a hearing until 29 January 2024, thereby allowing the company more time to restructure its debts. On 29 October 2023, at the previous adjournment, Hong Kong High Court Justice Linda Chan had originally said that the December hearing would be the last before a decision was made whether to liquidate Evergrande in the absence of a "concrete" restructuring plan. However, Evergrande applied for adjournment on 4 December, which was unexpectedly not opposed by the petitioner's lawyer.

=== Country Garden ===
In August 2023, Country Garden Holdings warned of a large net loss for the first six months of 2023 due to impairment on property projects and declining profit margins. Country Garden was the largest private property developer in China. Its loss was expected to be in the range of 45 billion yuan (US$6.25 billion) to 55 billion yuan, after a net profit of around 1.91 billion yuan in the same period in 2022. The company's shares fell up to 14.4 per cent to a record low on the day following the profit warning, closing below 1 HKD for the first time. Its stock was down 30% the following week. The actual loss for the first half year announced on 30 August 2023 was 48.9 billion yuan (US$6.7 billion).

On 15 August, Country Garden sought to delay payment on one private onshore bond, and suspended trading of 11 other onshore bonds, making some analysts believe that the company was preparing for a debt restructuring.

By the end of August 2023, Yang Huiyan, Country Garden's largest shareholder and China's richest woman two years previously, had seen her personal wealth decline by 84%, around US$28.6 billion.

On 30 August, Country Garden warned it was on the "brink" of default in a filing to the Hong Kong Stock Exchange, according to The Washington Post, as it had "failed to grasp and react to the risks of the ongoing real estate slump, most notably in smaller cities that are home to most of its developments." The Guardian noted that if Country Garden were not to meet a deadline for a bond payment at the beginning of September 2023, it would become the biggest Chinese real estate firm to default since the Evergrande default in 2021.

Although Country Garden was able to make its bond payments at the beginning of September 2023, on 10 October 2023, the company stated that it had failed to pay a HK$470 million (US$60 million) principal when due. The company added that it did not expect to be able to meet all its offshore payment obligations, including with regard to dollar-denominated bonds. Country Garden shares slumped over ten percent to HK$0.75 on the day of the statement. One of its US dollar bonds fetched about 7 cents on the dollar on the day, according to Bloomberg data. Company filings showed that, in the twelve months leading to September 2023, contracted monthly sales measured in billions of yuan had dropped from about 33 billion to 6 billion yuan. In October, South China Morning Post called this steep drop "a crisis of confidence" that had deprived Country Garden of a "crucial source of cash flow".

=== Zhongzhi and Zhongrong ===
Similar issues arose at Zhongzhi Enterprise Group, one of China's largest private wealth managers, with over US$137 billion of assets under management. In mid-August 2023, it suspended payments on nearly all of its products although it was not clear how many products Zhongzhi had defaulted on. The firm hired KPMG to review its balance sheet, as the Chinese banking regulator set up a task force to examine risks.

As of 2023, Zhongrong International Trust Co, a shadow banking in China was the ninth largest trust company in China, with about 600 billion yuan in assets under management, and was part-owned by Zhongzhi. On 14 August 2023, reports warned of an increased contagion risk, because Zhongrong missed its obligations for repayment on some investment products. Two Chinese companies said Zhongrong had not paid them in time for maturing investments.

On 22 November 2023, Zhongzhi Enterprise Group warned investors that it was not able to repay its debts; the wealth management company stated that its total liabilities were at least 420 billion yuan (US$59 billion), with a shortfall of up to 260 billion yuan (US$36.5 billion) compared to its total tangible assets. According to South China Morning Post this statement set off "alarm bells" in a trust sector that had invested a large portion of investors’ money in real estate projects.

=== Other firms ===
On 14 August, state-backed developer Sino-Ocean announced that it had missed nearly US$21 million in interest payments.

== 2024 ==
=== Evergrande ===
On 29 January, Evergrande was ordered to liquidate, when a Hong Kong-based court found that it did not have a viable restructuring plan. Trading was halted for stocks in China Evergrande, China Evergrande New Energy Vehicle Group, and Evergrande Property Services. Upon trading being halted on 29 January, the China Evergrande Group stock price had fallen to a record low of HK$0.16 (US$0.02).

However, the Hong Kong court decision came on the same day as a Memorandum of understanding between Hong Kong and Beijing on the reciprocal enforcement of rulings in civil cases came into effect. This memorandum of understanding states that cross-border enforcement can be refused if legal proceedings are initiated in Hong Kong before a mainland Chinese court hears the case or the defendant is not given a reasonable opportunity to mount a defence.

According to a report by US media company Fortune, Evergrande bonds traded at one percent of their face value in February 2024. The report stated that this could serve as a warning to global investors in other Chinese property companies, e.g. Country Garden Holdings. David Knutson, chair of The Credit Roundtable, was quoted as saying: "Investors probably did not fully appreciate the risk of state intervention. Apportioning losses between domestic creditors and foreign creditors will be political". In February 2024, Evergrande liquidators also prepared for a potential lawsuit against its former auditor PwC.

Evergrande stated on 19 March 2024 that the China Securities Regulatory Commission (CSRC) had found that the company had overstated its revenue in 2019 by 214 billion yuan (nearly US$30 billion), or about half, and in 2020 its revenue was overstated by nearly 80%, or 350 billion yuan (US$48.6 billion), totalling US$78 billion. For example, apartments were marked as ready to occupy when the land was still vacant. This allowed Evergrande to issue bonds (debt) that contributed to its collapse. The CSRC also suspected problems with the bonds Evergrande issued. The regulator fined Evergrande 4.2 billion yuan (US$333 million) for falsifying its revenue, among other violations.

On 22 August 2024, PricewaterhouseCoopers LLP's China unit (PwC) told its customers that it expected to be banned from working in China for six months due to its involvement in the Evergrande scandal. PwC approved Evergrande's financial statements for 2019 and 2020, and was fined US$62 million.

=== Country Garden ===
Ever Credit, a wholly owned unit of Hong Kong-based Kingboard Holdings, filed a winding-up petition against Country Garden at the end of February because a loan worth about US$204 million had not been repaid. A court hearing was scheduled for 17 May 2024. At the beginning of March, Country Garden missed a payment of 96 million yuan due to Chinese onshore bondholders; the note had a 30-day grace period, however. In June the liquidation hearing was pushed off further, until late July. In July it was further postponed to January 2025.

=== Vanke ===
Vanke, one of China's largest property firms, put 19,000 square metres of land up for sale on 18 May 2024 at a discount of 29%, (900 million yuan or US$125 million) on the price it paid in 2017. The sales were meant to enable the property developer to pay down its debts. The newspaper also added that the company's woes were different from such struggling developers as Evergrande or Country Garden. Shenzhen Metro, a state-owned firm, held about a quarter of Vanke's shares at the time, giving Vanke good access to state funds. Vanke had also been included on a government list of "high-quality" developers in 2023.

Vanke booked a loss of 1.7bn yuan in the first quarter of 2024. Its sales fell by 43% year over year. The company owed 320 billion yuan (US$44 billion) in May 2024, with nearly 10% of this debt due for repayment in 2025.

== 2025 ==
=== Evergrande ===
On 17 February, Hong Kong High Court ordered a key offshore financing unit of China Evergrande Group, Tianji Holding, to be wound up. A court hearing with regard to an offshore arm was also planned for the next day. The High Court said that Tianji Holding, Evergrande's offshore subsidiary and guarantor, was insolvent and needed to be liquidated "as soon as possible" to protect creditors.

On 12 August, the Evergrande Group announced it would be delisted from the Hong Kong Stock Exchange on 22 August after trading remained suspended for over 18 months following a court-ordered liquidation in January 2024, with the company owing more than US$300 billion and unable to present a viable debt restructuring plan.

=== Vanke ===
Despite efforts by Chinese authorities to resolve a liquidity crisis in the property sector, Vanke came under pressure due to challenges in handling its finances. In January 2025, Chinese state media reported that authorities had detained the company's CEO and the company itself could face a takeover or reorganisation. On 17 January 2025, the Shenzhen government held a closed meeting to plan on stabilising Vanke's finances.

=== Country Garden ===
In July 2024, Hong Kong High Court had decided to further postpone the hearing of Country Garden's liquidation petition to 20 January 2025, giving the company some breathing room to finalize its offshore debt restructuring plan. On 14 January 2025, Country Garden said that its net loss for the first half of 2024 had been 12.8 billion yuan (US$1.75 billion), down from 48.9 billion yuan in 2023, and that revenue for the first half of 2024 fell by 55 per cent from a year earlier. The company added that the slump in China's property market was continuing in 2025, even though the government was supporting the property sector.

On 16 January 2025, the Country Garden presented a proposal to its offshore creditors aimed at reducing $11.6 billion in debt. On 11 April 2025, Country Garden stated that the company had reached agreement with a group of important bondholders and was close to finalising negotiations with a group of bank creditors; following the default on its offshore debt in late 2023, the company now planned to reduce $14.1 billion of its debt by 78%, leaving its creditors and bondholders with 22% of the value.

Country Garden stated on 19 August 2025 that it would incur a bigger loss for the first half of fiscal year 2025 than anticipated. Delivered housing projects halved compared to 2024. The company said that it had delivered about 74,000 housing units in the first half of 2025, which compared with more than 150,000 units in the same period of 2024.

== Response ==
In early January 2023, the People's Bank of China (PBOC) and the China Banking and Insurance Regulatory Commission allowed areas with declining housing prices for three months to lower or remove mortgage rate floors for first-time buyers. By mid-February 2023, over 30 cities had reduced mortgage rates to their lowest in over a decade, with local governments offering purchase subsidies and relaxed limits.

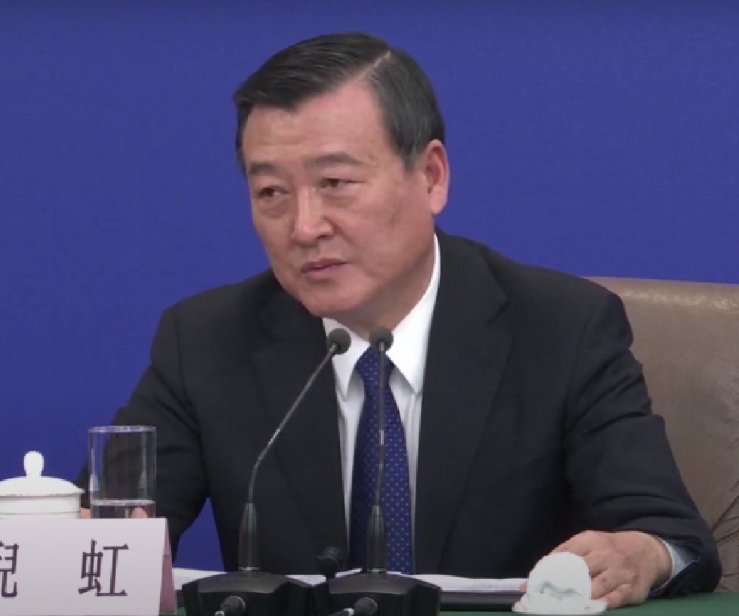
Ni Hong, China's minister of housing and urban-rural development

In response to the property crisis, in March 2024, China's minister of housing and urban-rural development Ni Hong said at a press conference that real estate developers must go bankrupt if necessary "in accordance with the law or market principles."

In May 2024, the PBOC announced a 300 billion yuan (41.5 billion USD) facility to support affordable housing. It was created to help local state-owned enterprises buy unsold homes. Vice Premier He Lifeng stated local governments can buy properties at "reasonable prices" for affordable housing, but details on the number of properties or timeline were not provided. The central bank also removed the minimum mortgage rate and lowered down payments for first-time and second-home buyers.

In October 2024, China declared that their property sector had "bottomed out". In response, minister Ni Hong announced that the country would expand its "whitelist" of real estate projects and increase bank lending to 4 trillion yuan by year-end. China approved a total of 2.23 trillion yuan in loans to "whitelisted" developers. Ni noted a recovery due to promising home purchase data that month. Hong Kong stocks declined for four consecutive days because the press conference by the housing ministry did not meet investor expectations.

== Impact ==
As a result of the slowdown, the real estate sector decreased as a share of China's economy, though estimates disagree on the exact numbers. According to Bloomberg Economics estimates, the sector contributed to about 19% of China's GDP in 2024, down from a peak of 24% in 2018. According to the National Bureau of Statistics, the share of real estate and related industries as a share of China's GDP dropped from 14.45% in 2021 to 12.94% in 2024, while the share of real estate alone dropped from 7.7% to 6.27%. According to economists' estimates, house prices in China decreased by around 30% from 2021 to 2026.

China's real estate slowdown has reduced local government income. In 2022, land sale revenue dropped to 6.7 trillion yuan, a 23 percent decrease from 2021. This revenue made up 24 percent of total local government income, down from 30 percent the previous year. Taxes from land and property development also fell by 8 percent. Overall, combined land revenue decreased from 37 percent to 31 percent of local government revenue. While the General Public Budget saw a slight decline of 0.5 percent, intergovernmental transfers from the central government increased by 18 percent. In 2023, land sale revenue fell 27 percent in the first quarter. The slowdown led to the real estate sector to be increasingly dominated by state-owned enterprises, in contrast to the previous domination by private companies. By 2024, state-owned enterprises were winning a majority of residential land auctions in cities like Beijing.

== See also ==
- Chinese property bubble (2005–2011)
- Financial contagion
- 1991 Indian economic crisis
- Stock market crash
- Stock market crashes in India
- List of stock market crashes and bear markets
