= Local government financing vehicle =

Funding mechanism by local governments in China

In China, a local government financing vehicle (LGFV) (Chinese: 地方政府融资平台) is an investment company formed by local governments to raise funds, usually by borrowing money to finance real estate development and other local infrastructure projects. They allow local governments to finance infrastructure projects while complying with laws prohibiting them from issuing bonds or having deficits.

Developed in the 1990s, LGFVs were popular among local governments for local investments to spur economic growth. However, in the years after the 2008 financial crisis and the 2020 property crisis, LGFVs were increasingly criticized for the accumulation of large amounts of debt supported by low-return assets and for raising off-budget debt through the shadow banking system.

Both the number and the indebtedness of LGFVs have increased in recent years, sparking fears about their inability to repay debts as well as subsequent defaults. The Chinese government does not publish the size of LGFV debt, but the International Monetary Fund estimated that LGFV debt by the end of 2023 amounted to US$8 trillion (47% of China's GDP), 75% of which were held by banks.

== Definition and function ==
LGFVs were first officially defined in 2010 as "economic entities with independent legal personality, which are established by local governments and their departments and agencies through fiscal appropriation or injection of assets such as land or equity, to perform the function of financing government-invested projects." (Note: In Chinese, "地方政府及其部门和机构等通过财政拨款或注入土地、股权等资产设立，承担政府投资项目融资功能，并拥有独立法人资格的经济实体") Their names do not include "financing vehicles" but often "construction investment" or "developmental investment" to highlight their role in investment rather than financing.

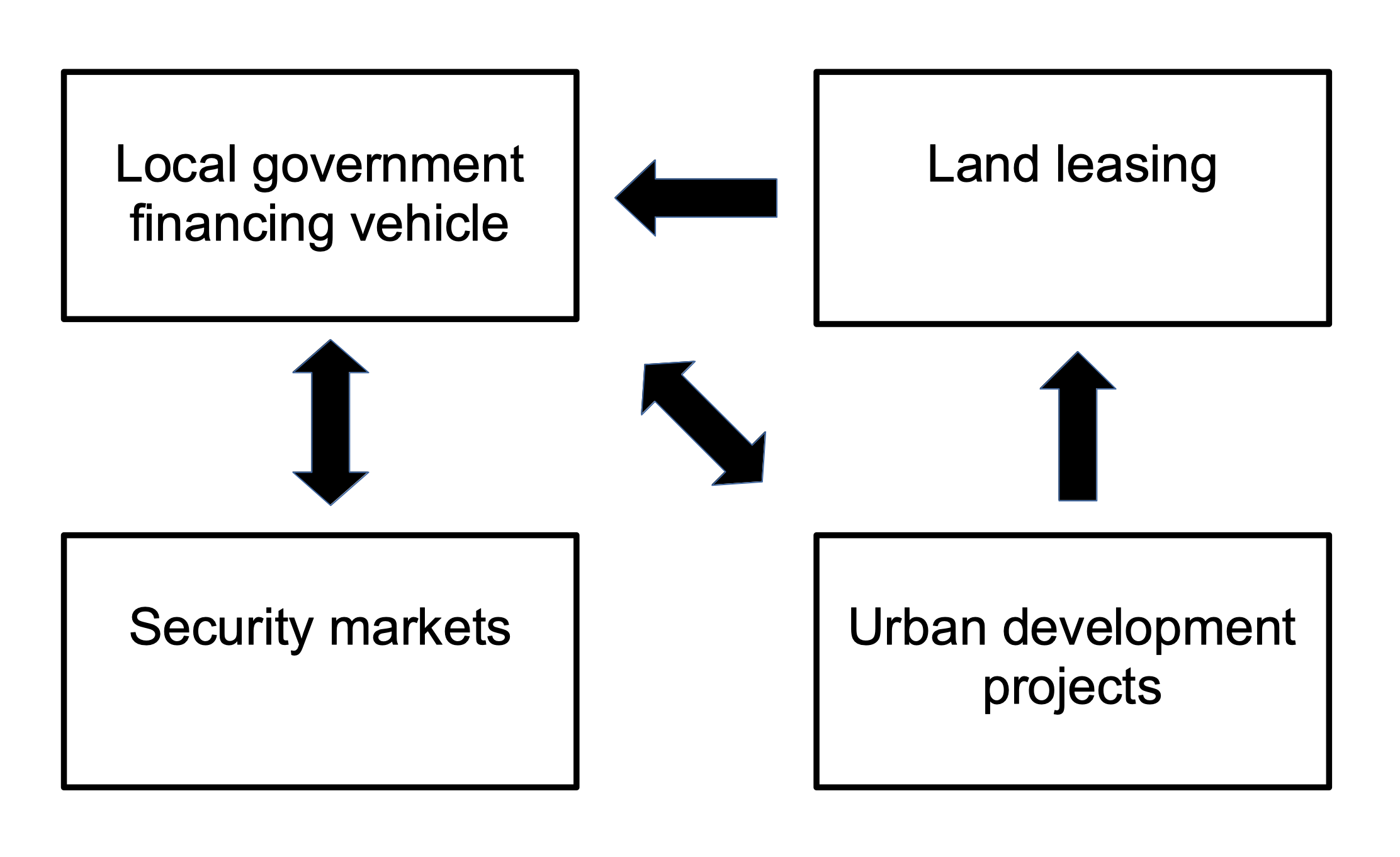
Simplified diagram of cash flows for a local government financing vehicle

As state-owned enterprises, LGFVs raise funds on behalf of local governments, which are legally prohibited from borrowing from banks, and before 2015, from issuing bonds. However, they have varying corporate structures and sizes. To establish an LGFV, the local government typically transfers to the vehicle a parcel of land to be used as collateral for issuing bonds in the securities market or for loans from banks or shadow banks. Banks and brokers also repackage some of the bonds as wealth management products sold to individual investors. LGFVs also heavily rely on government-granted land use rights, which combined with government funding, allows the vehicles to borrow from banks or raise funds by other means, such as land finance.

Although the law prevents state authorities from being guarantors, the vehicles can borrow or raise large sums due to the local government's implicit guarantee against credit risk and ability to inject assets into the vehicle when necessary. This relationship between an LGFV and its local government lead banks to regard their loans to carry little risk.

The LGFV then provides funds for urban development projects. The developments typically increase the value of the surrounding land, which is owned by the local government. The higher land value then increases local government revenue through the local government's leasing of land by selling land use rights. The LGFV then repays its loans using revenue from the land lease and any revenue from completed projects. If these sources are insufficient, it may issue further bonds, or rely on further government funding, which can take form as subsidiesor a line of credit.

== History ==
=== Background ===
Since 1980, two years after China's economic reforms began in 1978, local governments shared their tax revenue with the central government in a Chengbao scheme. The arrangement allowed them to retain any surplus revenue after paying the central government an agreed amount, which ensured that local governments were incentivized to grow the local economy. The tax-sharing system reduced the share of revenue that went to the central government and caused local governments to reduce taxes while increasing non-budgetary revenues, such as administrative fees, which did not need to be shared with the central government.

A tax reform was introduced in 1994 to increase central revenue. Local tax revenue decreased to below 50% of China's total fiscal revenue from around 80%. However, local governments were still responsible for more than 70% of regular expenditure.

The reform also prohibited local governments from issuing bonds and required them to maintain a balanced budget and no debt. This made it much harder for local governments to secure financing for infrastructure development, but allowed them to operate local state-owned banks, which later engaged in "backdoor financing" with LGFVs. Further restrictions were introduced in 1996, when the People's Bank of China published its General Rules for Loans that prohibited local governments from borrowing in any form.

However, the 1994 reform allowed local governments to finance projects by leasing land. In addition, the central government gave up its share of land transfer proceeds, so the proceeds would belong entirely to local governments. This incentivized local governments to increase land value by developing infrastructure, and LGFVs emerged as a solution to the problem of raising finance for these projects.

=== Origins ===
Some have argued that the Shanghai Urban Construction Investment and Development Corporation was the first LGFV created, in 1992. It issued the first LGFV bond, the Pudong New Area Construction Bond, that supported the development of the Pudong district of Shanghai. However, it has also been said that the Shanghai LGFV did not utilize land finance, which is characteristic of later LGFVs.

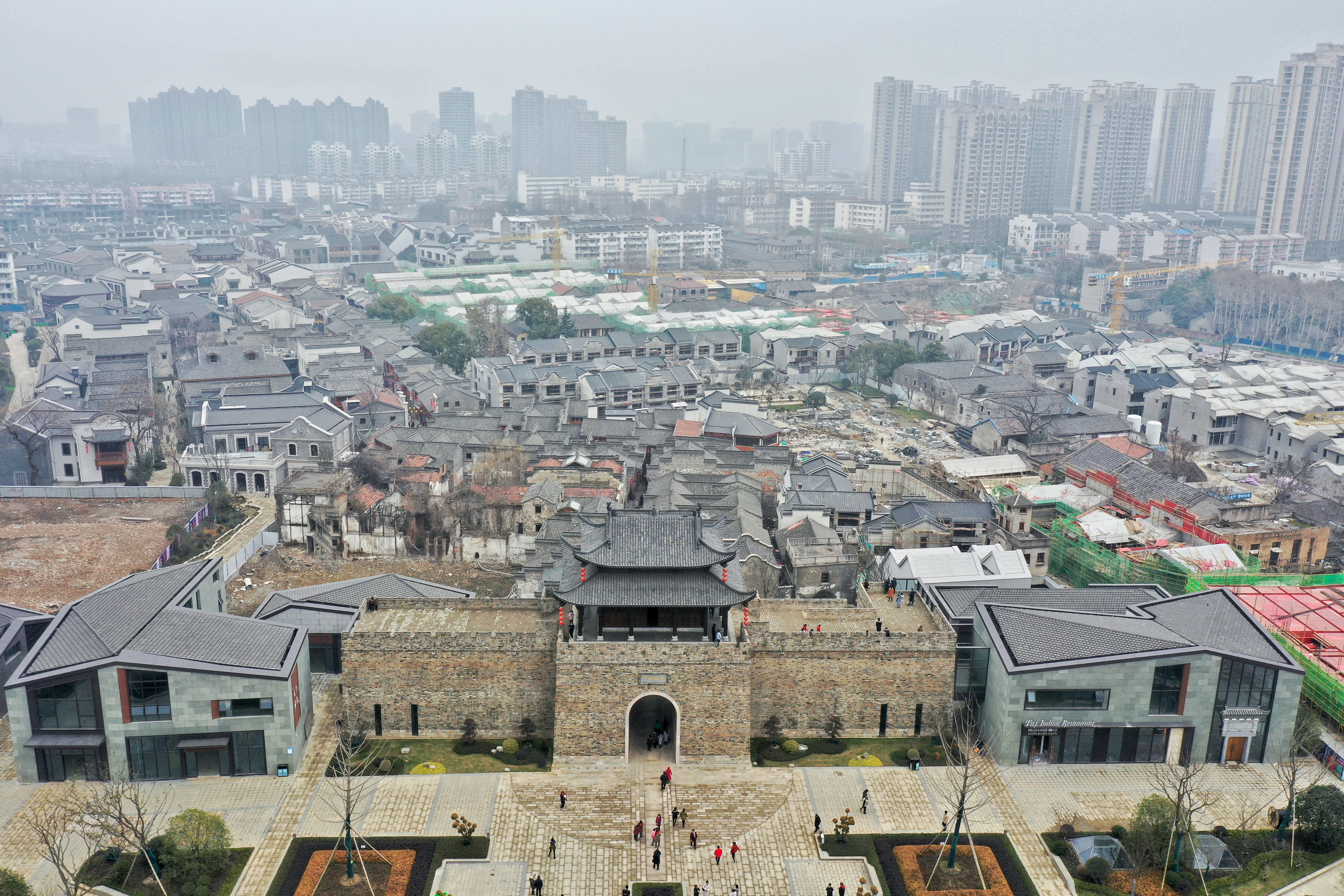
The government of Wuhu, pictured in 2020, established the first LGFV.

The LGFV model that became ubiquitous across China began in the city of Wuhu, Anhui. In 1998, the Wuhu government established the Wuhu Construction Investment Company to borrow ¥1.08 billion from China Development Bank (CDB) to invest in six projects related to highways, water utilities, and waste management, following the bank's advice that creating a separate company would reduce credit risk. The loan was taken out for the projects as a bundle, allowing projects likely to generate revenue to support those that were socially beneficial but probably unprofitable. The Wuhu government injected into the LGFV bankable infrastructure assets, the profit from which was used as a collateral for borrowing. CDB further enforced the loan by keeping a close relationship with the Anhui provincial government that had oversight over the Wuhu authorities and monitoring the activity of the Wuhu Construction Investment Company's account in CDB.

Land financing was later introduced to allow more borrowing. The Wuhu government initially used tax revenue to repay the loan, but from 2002, the Wuhu Construction Investment Company used proceeds from land sales as collateral, which provided larger sums for repayment. To borrow an additional ¥1.095 billion from CDB, the Wuhu government allowed the company to bid for and auction off its land for revenue to guarantee repayment.

=== Expansion ===
The Wuhu model was eventually applied to other cities, including Tianjin. The Tianjin government borrowed ¥50 billion from CDB in 2003 for transport, river management, urban landscaping, and land projects. Chongqing established at least eight LGFVs in 2002, which was a threefold growth in infrastructural investment from 2001 to 2006. By 2007, a total of 2,380 LGFVs held 23,150 loans. Each vehicle on average took approximately 10 loans from 2.3 banks at ¥540 million each.

The Chinese government's response to the 2008 financial crisis significantly increased the level of LGFV borrowing. The national stimulus program worth ¥4 trillion (US$562 billion) required local governments to bear 70% of the spending. Expanded LGFV borrowing helped support the additional expense required by the stimulus package.

However, the maturity date of only a few years of such loans and slower economic growth also increased the financial pressure on local governments and their need to borrow. Limited land availability and protests by landowners whose land was expropriated also made reliance on land finance unattractive. The central government therefore allowed LGFVs to issue municipal corporate bonds that were sold as wealth management products in the shadow banking system, enabling local governments to convert high-interest loans with short maturity dates into bonds carrying a lower cost and more time for repayment.

Encouraged by People's Bank of China and the China Banking Regulatory Commission, local authorities established more LGFVs, reaching 10,797 by the end of 2012. Loans by commercial banks to local governments rose by 70% between the end of 2008 and the end of 2009, with local debt reaching ¥7.7 trillion in 2010 and ¥17.9 trillion by 2013. From 2007 to 2013, the average maturity period of the loans rose from 3.4 to 4.1 years. Most investments made under the stimulus package were unprofitable.

=== Regulatory tightening ===
The People's Bank of China and various parts of the Chinese government began to warn about the financial and fiscal risks of LGFVs in 2010. In June, the Chinese government published its first policy document on LGFVs, which was known as Document 19. The early policies focused on minimizing the short-term risks of debt but not the system of LGFVs. These measures required banks to only lend for profitable investments and for an annual amount not exceeding that of the previous year.

In 2014, Chinese local governments were permitted to borrow money directly, in an attempt to reduce their reliance on LGFVs. A study by Chang-Tai Hsieh, Bai Chong'en and Zheng Song estimates that off-balance-sheet by local governments contributed to around 11% of GDP in 2014 and 2015.

By 2017, bonds represented 90% of local government debt, up from 7% in 2014 (when most debt was borrowing from banks).

In 2018, the central government announced that it would not bail out LGFVs that go bankrupt, in order to signal the need for caution to the financial markets.

Around this time reforms were made which increased local government's share of value-added tax from 25% to 50%, and granted them a share of the consumption tax.

It was estimated that revenue from the sale of land use rights constituted 60-80% of local government revenue in 2018. In 2019, LGFV bonds constituted 39% of total outstanding corporate bonds in China's domestic (onshore) bond market, with widely varying credit risks.

=== COVID-19 pandemic and property sector crisis (2020–present) ===
During the COVID-19 pandemic between 2019 and 2022, debt held by 15 provincial-level governments rose by at least 50%, with most of the increase attributed to debt held by LGFVs. With the rise of COVID-19 cases in 2020, land revenue of local governments decreased, which made local LGFV debt more difficult to manage. However, pandemic-related bonds issued by the central government helped to alleviate local debt pressure by encouraging local authorities to continue land sales, resulting in an increase in land revenue.

Land sales further declined after the central government enforced the "three red lines" beginning August 2020, to regulate the debt burden borne by major real estate developers. Companies such as Evergrande, Sunac, and Greenland Group were prohibited from further borrowing, while other developers that breached fewer liability requirements were restricted from taking new loans, including acquiring land from local governments. Revenue from land transfer in 13 provinces in 2021 was 20% lower than in 2020.

The Chinese property sector crisis that followed heightened concerns about the reliance of local authorities on LGFVs and land sales, as local government bonds reached ¥28.6 trillion yuan or 23% of the Chinese bond market by September 2021.

In 2021, regulations were introduced prohibited financial institutions from providing fresh liquidity to LGFVs. Following these regulations, local governments are required to raise funds through issuing bonds, subjecting them to stronger oversight. On 23 October, a five-year trial of the proposed tax was announced for select regions with particularly hot property markets, such as Shenzhen, Hangzhou and Hainan. Although the property tax could reduce government reliance on land value through LGFVs, it has been estimated that a property tax could reduce land value by 50%, and that this risk to property owners was contributing to lower land sales.

Although no LGFV has defaulted as of 2023, some have been making last-minute payments, which can indicate financial distress. In July, state-owned banks began to lend to LGFVs with a repayment period of 25 years to relieve some of the pressure.

== Cause ==
In addition to overcoming legal restrictions on raising debt by local governments, using LGFVs as a fundraising platform is incentivized by China's political system that evaluates cadres by local economic growth. As economic growth is mainly driven by investment and infrastructure development, local officials are motivated to expand fiscal expenditure. The spending could also be in risky investments because local governments expect the central government to support local authorities that are in financial trouble (see soft budget constraint).

== Scale and debt risk ==
No Chinese government agency has published data on the scale of LGFV debt regularly, but official snapshots are available. The National Audit Office counted 7,170 LGFVs in 2013, when ¥17.9 trillion of outstanding debt was accumulated by LGFVs and other government entities.

By the end of 2017, the value of bonds issued by LGFVs was ¥7.1 trillion.

Peking University's Yang Yao attributed the problem of unsustainable local government debt to various political economy issues, including the moral hazard of local governments not bearing the risk from their borrowing, and frequent rotation of officials. To improve the situation, he proposed a support package from the central government worth ¥4 billion and debt restructuring options such as integrating the budgets of all state-owned enterprises with their corresponding governments.

In 2023, a study by David Daokui Li concluded that local government debt was 50% higher than previously estimated by the IMF and World Bank. The study found that the majority of debts were for infrastructure, and the level of debt was unsustainable without central government support.

By 2024, economists estimated that the indebtedness attributable to LGFVs had reached between US$7 trillion and US$11 trillion, the Wall Street Journal reported. Of that debt, US$800 billion was estimated to be at high risk of default. Many projects funded by LGFVs were found to be ill-conceived and poorly planned. The IMF estimated that LGFV debt in China will have grown by 60% in 2028 compared to 2022 levels.
