= Paul Wing (disambiguation) =

Paul Wing may refer to:

- Paul Wing, assistance director at Paramount Pictures
- Paul Wing, half of the Asian-American dancing duo Toy & Wing
- Paul Cheung Kwok Wing, Chinese entrepreneur
