= Hengchi 5 =

Battery electric mid-size crossover SUV

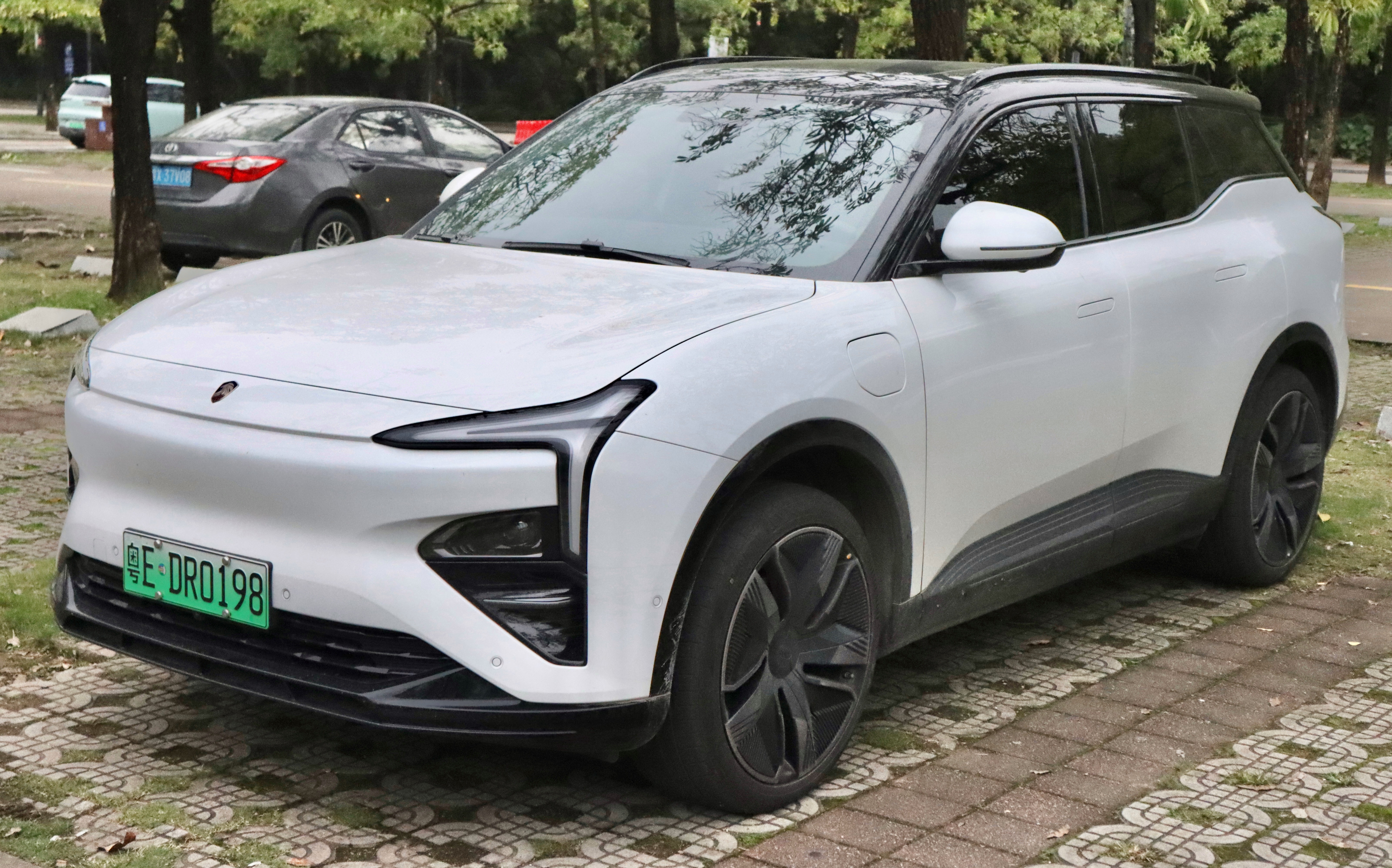

Overview
- Manufacturer: Hengchi (Evergrande)
- Production: 2022–2023
- Assembly: China: Tianjin

Body and chassis
- Class: Mid-size crossover SUV
- Body style: 5-door SUV

Powertrain
- Engine: Permanent magnet synchronous motor
- Power output: 152 kW (204 hp)
- Battery: 72.8 kWh LFP CATL
- Range: 602 km (CLTC)

Dimensions
- Wheelbase: 2,780 mm (109.4 in)
- Length: 4,725 mm (186.0 in)
- Width: 1,925 mm (75.8 in)
- Height: 1,676 mm (66.0 in)
- Curb weight: 2,380 kg (5,247 lb)

The Hengchi 5 is a battery electric mid-size crossover SUV produced by Chinese automobile manufacturer Hengchi, an automotive brand under the Evergrande New Energy Auto company.

== Overview ==
Production of the Hengchi 5 successfully started in Tianjin in January 2022, after production being suspended in mid-2021. Presales of the Hengchi 5 started in July 2022, and deliveries started in October 2022.

== Technical details ==
The Hengchi 5 is equipped with 72.8kWh lithium iron phosphate batteries produced by CATL giving it a CLTC range of 602km, and an electric motor developed by Bosch producing 150 kW and 345 Nm of torque (204 hp/255 lbs-feet). 0 to 100 km/h acceleration is 7.8 seconds. The vehicle is also equipped with Qualcomm's third-generation Snapdragon digital cockpit platform with Snapdragon 8155 chips. An OTA upgrade for the Hengchi 5 on April 3 2023 made the H-Pilot assisted driving system available for the first time.

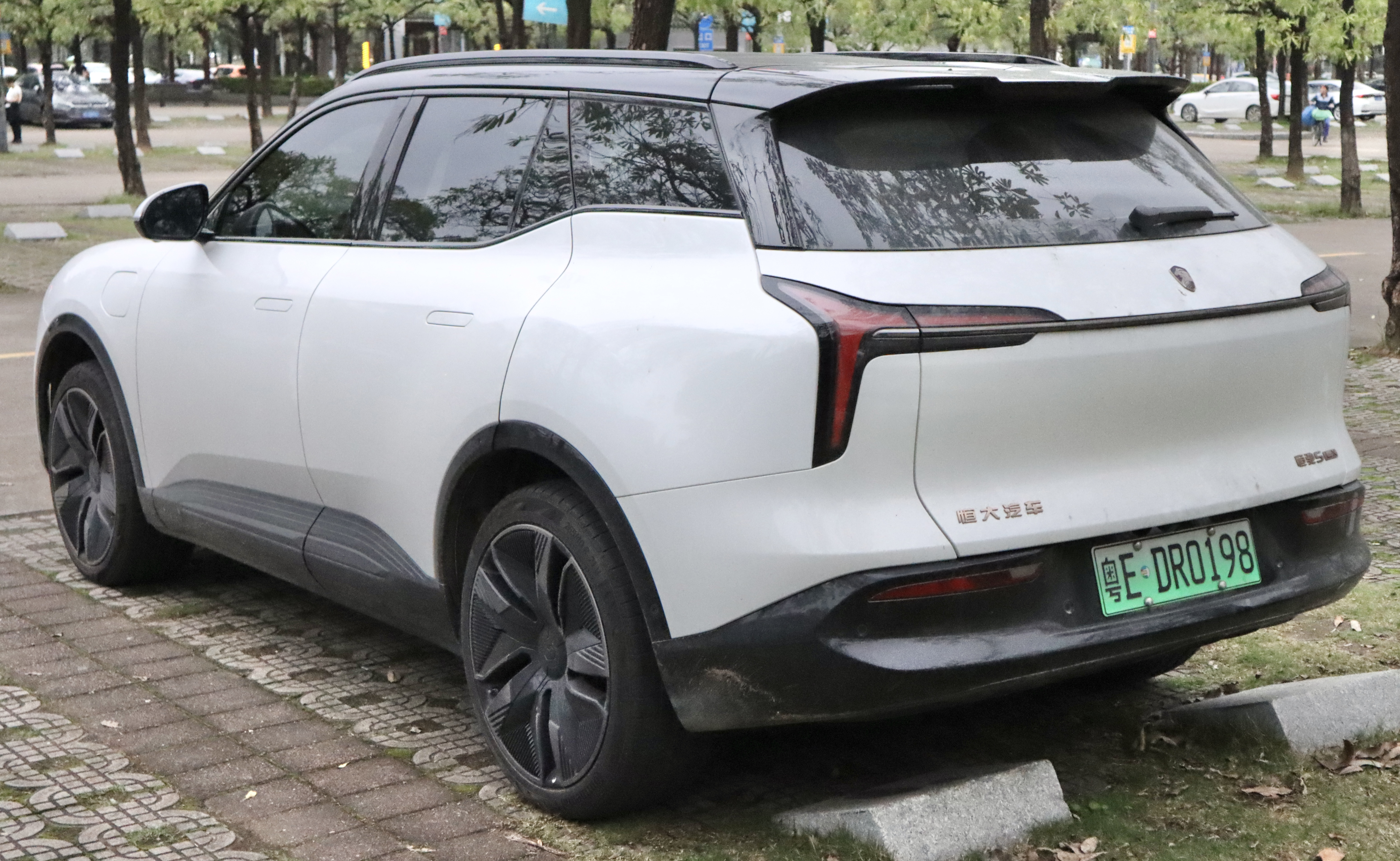
Rear view
