= Guangzhou Football Park =

Football stadium

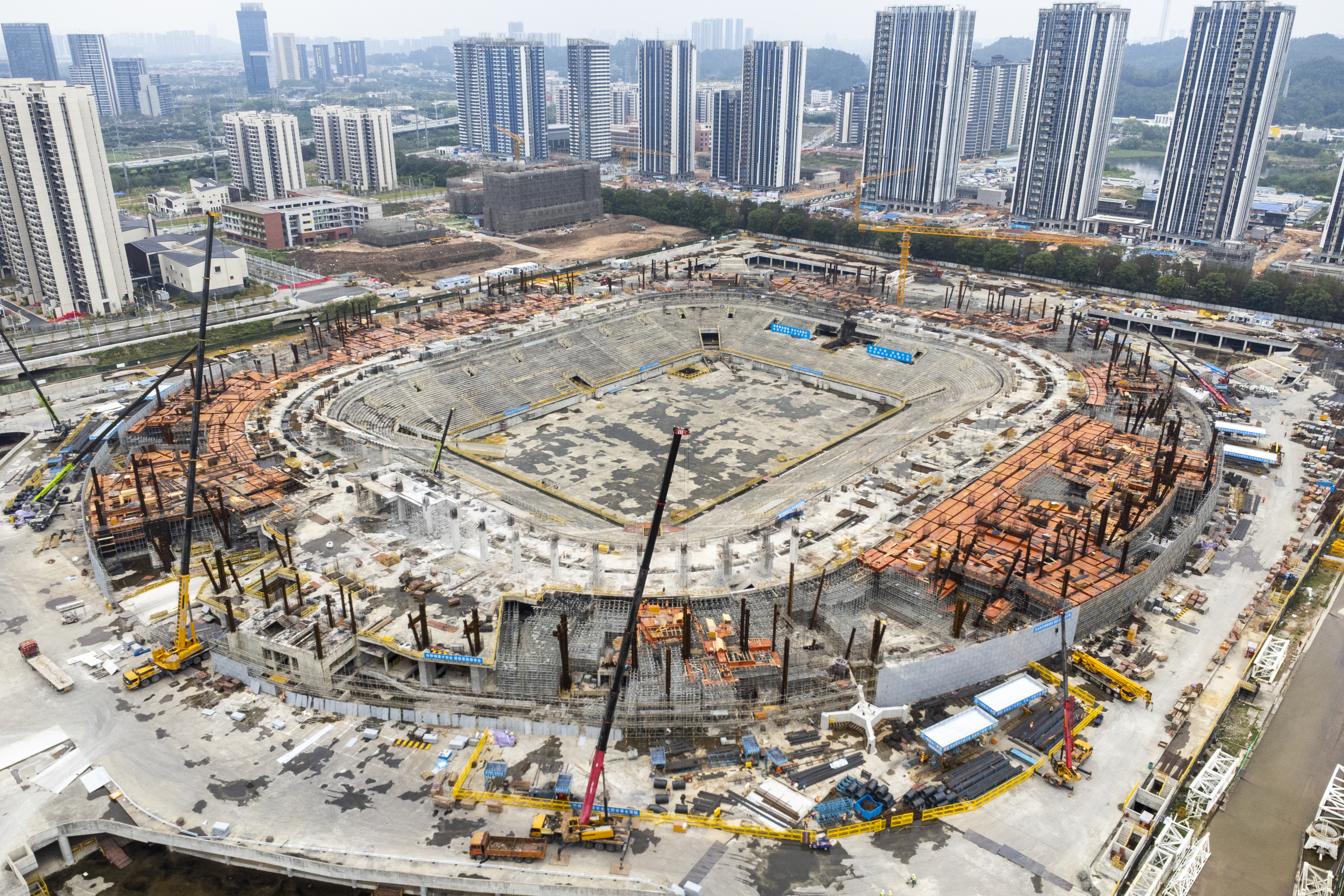
- Guangzhou Football Park under construction in March 2024
- Interactive map of Guangzhou Football Park
- Full name: Guangzhou Football Park
- Former names: Guangzhou Evergrande Football Stadium
- Location: Panyu District, Guangzhou, China
- Coordinates: 22°59′05.2″N 113°17′11.7″E
- Capacity: 74,707

Construction
- Groundbreaking: April 2020; 6 years ago
- Opened: 2028
- Cost: 12 billion yuan (US$1.7 billion)
- Architect: Hasan Syed (Gensler)

Guangzhou Football Park is a football stadium under construction in Guangzhou, China.

It was named at the first as Guangzhou Evergrande Football Stadium and planned to become the home stadium of the football club Guangzhou Evergrande. The construction of the 12 billion yuan (US$1.7 billion) stadium began on 16 April 2020. The design of the lotus-shaped stadium was that of Shanghai-based American architect Hasan Syed. The stadium would have had a seating capacity for 100,000 people and was planned to open in December 2022.

In September 2021, the Evergrande Group said that the construction of the stadium would still proceed despite the company's liquidity crisis. In November 2021, the stadium was seized by the Chinese government with plans to sell the incomplete stadium to another company or transfer ownership to the state-owned Guangzhou City Construction Investment Group. At that time construction of the stadium was reportedly halted for at least three months already, contradicting Evergrande's earlier statement.

In mid-2022, due to the Chinese property sector crisis sparked by the Evergrande Group, it was assumed that the project was cancelled. In March 2024, the Guangzhou City Construction Investment Group handed the site to China Construction Fourth Engineering Division, a subsidiary of China State Construction Engineering, to continue construction. The stadium would be redesigned by the Guangdong Architectural Design and Research Institute to a design revealed in September 2023, which saw the loss of the lotus design and a reduction in capacity to 74,707.
