= Evergrande International Financial Center T1 =

Skyscraper on hold in Hefei, China

- Interactive map of the Evergrande International Financial Center T1 area
- Alternative names: Evergrande IFC Main Tower, Evergrande IFC Tower One

General information
- Status: On hold
- Location: Hefei, China
- Construction started: 2016
- Estimated completion: 2028
- Owner: Evergrande Group

Height
- Height: 518 m (1,699 ft)

Technical details
- Floor count: 112

Design and construction
- Architect: Atkins

Evergrande International Financial Center T1 (also referred to as Evergrande IFC Main Tower) is a skyscraper on hold in Hefei, China. Once completed it would be the tallest building in Anhui province and one of the tallest buildings in the world.

The design of the building was inspired by bamboo.

== See also ==
- List of tallest buildings
- List of tallest buildings in China
