= Evergrande Center =

Skyscraper in Shenzhen, China

- 恒大中心
- Alternative names: Shenzhen Bay Super Headquarters City

General information
- Status: On-hold
- Type: Office
- Location: Baishi 4th road & Shenwan 3rd road, Shenzhen Bay, Shenzhen, China
- Groundbreaking: 2017
- Construction started: 2019
- Estimated completion: TBA
- Owner: Evergrande Group

Height
- Architectural: 394 m (1,293 ft)
- Tip: 394 m (1,293 ft)

Technical details
- Floor count: 71

Design and construction
- Architects: Hanhai Architectural Design Co., Ltd.
- Developer: Evergrande Group

Evergrande Center (Chinese: 恒大中心) is a supertall skyscraper on-hold designed by Hanhai Architectural Design Co., Ltd. in the Baishi 4th road & Shenwan 3rd road, Shenzhen Bay, Shenzhen, China.

== See also ==
- List of tallest buildings
- List of tallest buildings in China
