= Fantasia Holdings =

Leading property developer in China

Fantasia Holdings Group Company Limited 花样年控股集团有限公司
- Company type: Listed company
- Industry: Property development
- Founded: 1996
- Headquarters: Shenzhen, Guangdong, People's Republic of China
- Area served: People's Republic of China
- Key people: Founder and Executive Director: Miss Zeng Jie; Chairman: Mr. Pun Jun
- Website: Fantasia Holdings Group Company Limited

Fantasia Holdings Group Company Limited (SEHK: 1777) is a leading property developer in China. It operates in five segments: property development, property investment, property operation services, property agency services and hotel services. Its other operations include provision of tourism and entertainment services, and interior design services.

== History ==
The Group first commenced its property development business in Shenzhen in 1996, which was established by Miss Zeng Jie, the niece of China's former vice-president, Zeng Qinghong. In 2009, its shares were listed on the Hong Kong Stock Exchange with IPO price of HK$2.2 per share.

On 5 October 2021, Fantasia Holdings missed a payment on a US$206 million bond that had matured the day before, triggering a default. Just weeks prior, the developer had assured investors it had "no liquidity issue". This resulted in fears of contagion from the Evergrande liquidity crisis.

== See also ==
- Evergrande liquidity crisis
