= Evergrande New Energy Auto =

Chinese automobile manufacturer

Evergrande
- Type: Subsidiary
- Industry: Automotive
- Founded: August 28, 2019; 7 years ago
- Founder: Xu Jiayin
- Headquarters: China, Sweden
- Subsidiaries: Hengchi
- Website: https://www.evergrande.com/

Evergrande New Energy Auto (Chinese: 恒大新能源汽車) was a Chinese automobile manufacturer owned by Evergrande Group that specializes in developing electric vehicles.

== History ==
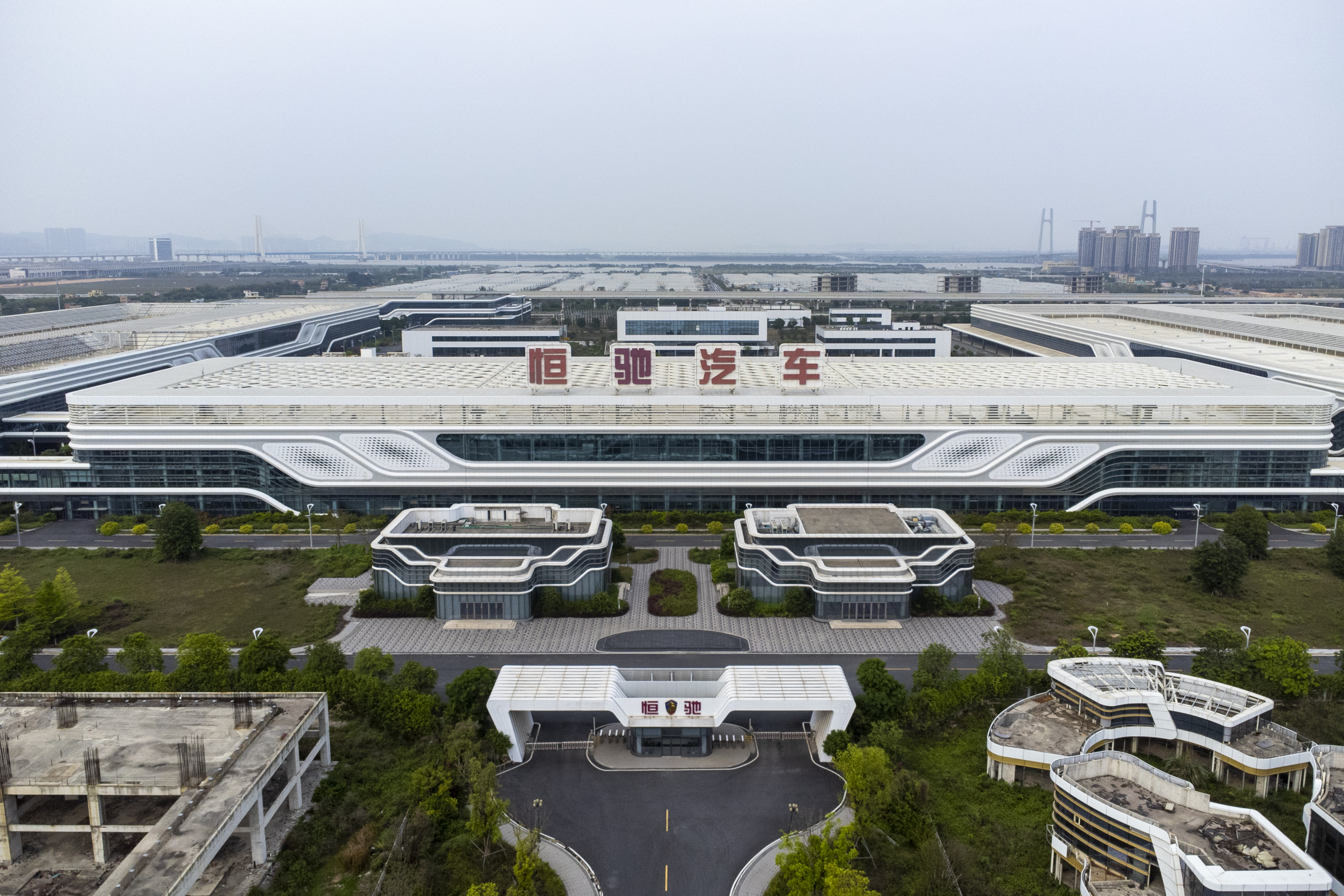
Evergrande Auto City in Nansha, Guangzhou

Evergrande was founded on August 28, 2019, and is located in China and Sweden. All of their vehicles are produced by founded marques.

Evergrande's primary marque is Hengchi.

After acquiring the assets of Saab from a bankruptcy estate in 2012, Evergrande also founded NEVS, while Koenigsegg had a brief cooperation with Evergrande which resulted in Evergrande taking a minority stake (20%) in the Swedish super car brand.

On February 2, 2024, Evergrande Auto issued an announcement that Evergrande Auto and Founder will study whether to proceed with the proposed transaction, involving the proposed transfer of the outstanding balance owed to China Evergrande Group, The related transactions and special transactions of Xu Jiayin and Xinxin in which the relevant loans were converted into new shares. The Company and the Subscriber have suspended negotiations on the revision of the terms of the proposed transaction, but are still studying whether to proceed with the proposed transaction and have not yet reached a final opinion. If the Company and the Subscriber decide to proceed with the Proposed Transaction, they will study and renegotiate to revise certain key terms of the Proposed Transaction.

On May 22, 2024, Evergrande New Energy Vehicle received a request from the local administrative department to terminate the agreement and return RMB 1.9 billion in rewards and subsidies.

In a 17 September 2026 financial report dated to 31 June 2026, Evergrande Auto disclosed that it had exited the automobile manufacturing business, and has switched to an asset-light model which primarily operates in the lithium-ion battery trading business, which commenced sales during the financial reporting period.
