= Anne Stevenson-Yang =

Anne Stevenson-Yang is a journalist, and writer. She is research director at J Capital Research.

From 1993 to 1997, she worked for the U.S. Information Technology Office. Her work appeared in Bloomberg, Forbes, and The Wire China.

== Works ==
- China Alone: The Emergence From, and Potential Return to Isolation (2013)
- Hello, Kitty and Other Stories (2024)
- Wild Ride: A Short History of the Opening and Closing of the Chinese Economy (2024)
