= China Aoyuan Group =

Chinese property developer

- Formerly: China Aoyuan Property Group
- Type: public
- Traded as: SEHK: 3883
- Industry: Real estate
- Founded: 1996
- Founder: Mr. Guo Ziwen
- Headquarters: Grand Cayman, Cayman Islands (registered office); Guangzhou, China (de facto)
- Area served: People's Republic of China
- Key people: Chairman: Mr. Guo Ziwen
- Website: www.aoyuan.com.cn

China Aoyuan Group Limited or Aoyuan is a property developer headquartered in Guangzhou, Guangdong, China. It is engaged in property development, leasing, and hotel operations in Mainland China. It develops real estate properties in Chongqing, Shenyang, Yulin, Jiangxi, Qingyuan, and Guangzhou.

Aoyuan's major shareholder, "Ace Rise Profits Limited", was incorporated in the British Virgin Islands.

On January 21, 2022, Fitch Ratings downgraded China Aoyuan Group Ltd. to 'Restricted Default' after their announcement that it won't make payments on a set of dollar bonds.

On December 20, 2023, the China Aoyuan Group declared Chapter 15 bankruptcy.

== Subsidiaries ==
- Guangzhou Aoyu (53.96%)
