= Hengchi =

Chinese automobile manufacturer

- Type: Private
- Traded as: Shenzhen Hengchi Automobile Trading Co., Ltd
- Industry: Automotive
- Founded: 2020; 6 years ago
- Founder: Xu Jiayin
- Headquarters: Nansha, China
- Key people: Anders Warming (designer), Selipanov (styling)
- Website: Evergrande; Hengchi Auto

Hengchi (Chinese: 恒驰), officially Shenzhen Hengchi Automobile Trading Co., Ltd, was a Chinese automobile manufacturer that specializes in developing electric vehicles owned by Evergrande Group. The subsidiary entered liquidation proceedings in September 2024.

== History ==
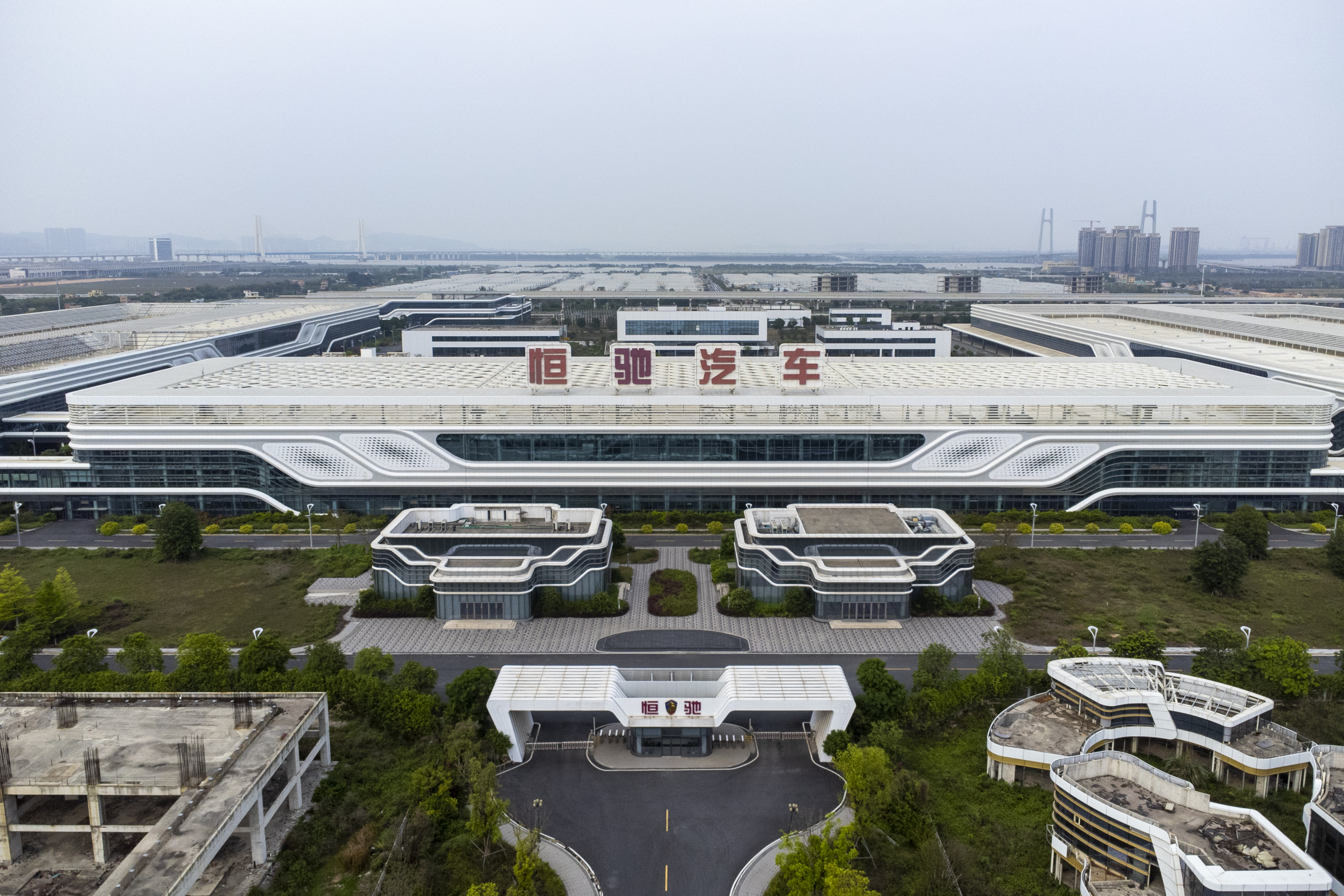
Evergrande Auto City in Nansha, Guangzhou

Hengchi was founded in 2020, and is located in Nansha. There are 9 concept models, all numbered and named Hengchi 1 through Hengchi 9. All vehicles were shown at the Company Event July 2020, including 4 sedans, 1 MPV, and 4 SUVs. The cars were shown at a company event in July 2020. The investment volume is estimated at 15 billion Yuan (2.14 billion US dollars).

The first and only model produced in series is the Hengchi 5, a 4.73 meter long SUV. It went on sale in the Chinese home market in July 2022. In the summer of 2024, the manufacturer had to file for bankruptcy.

== Vehicles ==
=== Discontinued vehicles ===
Model	Photo	Details
Hengchi 5		Body style: SUV Doors: 5 Seats: 5 Battery: Production: September 2022–December 2023 Revealed: 2020

=== Concept vehicles ===
Hengchi has 9 concept vehicles as of 2021, including the Hengchi 5 which become a production car model in 2022.

Model	Photo	Details
Hengchi 1		Body style: Sedan Doors: 4 Seats: 5 Battery: Revealed: 2020
Hengchi 2		Body style: Sedan Doors: 4 Seats: 5 Battery: Revealed: 2020
Hengchi 3		Body style: SUV Doors: 5 Seats: 5 Battery: Revealed: 2020
Hengchi 4		Body style: MPV Doors: 5 Seats: 7 Battery: Revealed: 2020
Hengchi 6		Body style: SUV Doors: 4 Seats: 5 Battery: Revealed: 2020
Hengchi 7		Body style: Sedan Doors: 4 Seats: 4 Battery: Revealed: 2020
Hengchi 8		Body style: Sedan Doors: 4 Seats: 4 Battery: Revealed: 2020
Hengchi 9		Body style: SUV Doors: 5 Seats: 4 Battery: Revealed: 2020
