= Wealth management product =

Uninsured financial product sold in China

A wealth management product (WMP; Chinese: 理财产品) is an uninsured financial product sold in China by banks and other financial institutions. Typically they offer a high rate of interest, and sometimes, purportedly guaranteed return. As of 2016, $2.8 trillion had been sold by banks during the previous 5 years. While the government sometimes intervenes to prevent losses by investors, some WMPs have failed.

Financial experts such as David Daokui Li of Tsinghua University, a member of the Chinese central bank’s monetary policy committee, believe wealth management products pose substantial risks to China's financial stability.

Wealth management products grew rapidly throughout 2015 and 2016. Chinese households, companies and banks held a record balance of $3.9 trillion (26.3 trillion yuan) of WMPs as of June 30, 2016.

== See also ==
- Corporate debt bubble
- Shadow banking in China
- Local government financing vehicle
