= Paul Cheung Kwok Wing =

Chinese entrepreneur

Paul Cheung Kwok Wing (simplified Chinese: 张国荣; traditional Chinese: 張國榮), a Chinese entrepreneur, is the founder and CEO of Kingboard Chemical Holdings Limited in Hong Kong.

Paul Cheung Kwok Wing was born in Shenzhen, Guangdong. He worked on a farm with his father at a young age. Later, he moved to Hong Kong and worked at 3M, an American company, as a warehouse assistant, courier and salesman one after another. However, he finally quit the job at 3M and decided to develop his own business. With the financial support from his mother, Paul started his trading business by selling flagstone salt from Guangzhou to Hong Kong. Later, he founded Kingboard Chemical Holdings and set up factories in Shenzhen for productions of copper-clad laminate. The production line was then expanded to Dongguan, Huizhou and Qingyuan. His company now is the world's largest laminate boards producers and one of the largest printed circuit board producers.
