= Kingboard Holdings =

Manufacturing company

Kingboard Holdings Limited 建滔集團有限公司
- Type: Listed company
- Industry: Chemicals
- Founded: 1988
- Headquarters: Cayman Islands (registered office); Hong Kong (corporate headquarters)
- Area served: China
- Key people: Chairman: Mr. Paul Cheung Kwok Wing
- Website: www.kingboard.com

Kingboard Holdings Limited, formerly known as Kingboard Chemical Holdings Limited (SEHK: 148) is a manufacturer of laminates. Owned by Paul Cheung Kwok Wing's family, the company manufactures and distributes laminates, copper foil, coke, methanol, caustic soda, glass fabric, glass yarn, bleached craft paper, printed circuit boards, chemicals, liquid crystal displays, and magnetic products, as well as investing surplus funds in real estate assets globally. The group operates more than 60 manufacturing facilities in China and Thailand. It is headquartered in Shatin, New Territories, Hong Kong.

== History ==
In 1993, the company was listed on the Hong Kong Stock Exchange. In 2004, the Group successfully acquired Elec & Eltek. Kingboard Chemical Holdings Ltd. ("Kingboard Chemical") established its first laminates manufacturing plant in 1988.

Kingboard Copper Foil Holdings Limited, the Group’s subsidiary, was spun off for a separate listing on The Singapore Stock Exchange in December 1999. In November 2004, the Group acquired Elec & Eltek International Holdings Limited as part of a strategic expansion plan. In December 2006, the Group spun off its laminate business, Kingboard Laminates Holdings limited for a separate listing on the main board of The Stock Exchange of Hong Kong Limited. The Group's natural gas based methanol JV with China BlueChemical in Hainan province commenced production in December 2006.

In 2016, KLH purchased 15 Canada Square, home to KPMG LLP UK’s headquarters, for £400m on a 25 year sale-and-leaseback agreement at £18m a year.
