= Shadow banking in China =

Chinese shadow banking refers to underground financial activity that takes place outside of traditional banking regulations and systems. China has one of the largest shadow banking industries with approximately 40% of the country's outstanding loans tied up in shadow banking activities. Shadow banking in China arose after the People's Bank of China became the central bank in 1983. This encouraged commercial enterprises and private investors to place more of their money in financial products, causing the banking industry to grow.

The People's Bank of China, which is one of the central bodies responsible for regulating shadow banking activity in China

== History ==
Shadow banking in China is identified to have first emerged in the late 1990s, however its rapid growth came after the 2008 financial crisis. It is documented that the growth in shadow banking activity was due to the inability of the traditional banking system to meet the spike in demand for funding, due to tight regulation on lending. It is estimated that in the period of 2010–2012, non-financial intermediaries in China grew at a rate of 34% per year.

Some of the key reasons individuals and companies engage in shadow banking include, but are not limited to:

- an insufficient supply of credit from the four major banks;
- regulatory limitations around risky loans and finally;
- a failure from regulators to limit the capacity for regulatory arbitrage;
- inter-bank interactions exclusion from credit management; and,
- the Chinese government's control over interest rates.

In the past, other reasons have been identified, including the reserve ratio requirement of 75% for banks loans to their deposits, and regulatory discouragement of lending to certain industries.

The Chinese shadow banking is distinct in that China has a bank-dominant financial system, and unique regulatory constraints on credit lending. This means there are more barriers to accessing lines of credit for Chinese businesses and individuals. Banks are also responsible for issuing financial products and dealing with the funds and profit associated with these. As well, it is primarily driven by domestic institutions, rather than foreign investments and entities, as is usual in shadow banking activity in other countries. In China, where banks are discouraged from lending to certain industries and are mandated to offer frustratingly low interest rates on deposits, non-banks fill the gap. About two-thirds of all lending in China by shadow banks are "bank loans in disguise". One of the controversies of this industry is that retail investors are largely unsure about what sorts of risks they are taking on when engaging in shadow banking. The connections between traditional banks and the shadow banking system further cloud the picture and at the same time contribute to increased risk.

== Types of Shadow Banking ==
Shadow banking in China involves several different forms of credit activity, some which include banks, and others which do not. In China, the most common forms of shadow banking include the use of Wealth Management Products (WMPs), other trust products, entrusted loans as well as financial system interlinkages such as transferring beneficiary rights for trust accounts.

=== Wealth Management Products ===
Wealth management products (WMPs) are issues by banks, trusts, and securities firms and are financial products that have a higher monetary return than depositing your money in a bank. They are designed and sold by financial institutions as savings products but do not appear on the institution's balance sheets, meaning they are not affected by deposit regulations. Their yield comes from the 'performance' or 'value' of assets upon which the product is built. They work through offering fixed rate return that is more profitable than traditional depositing. In China, some investors will expect the bank controlling their WMP to bear the credit risk associated with it. The number of WMPs throughout China has increased steadily in recent times, approximated to be, "less than ¥500 billion in 2004 to ¥9.5 trillion by the end of 2013."

=== Trust Products ===
Trust products refers to the category of financial products including trust loans, unlisted equity in companies and the trading of assets or capital packages. They designed and issued by, "non-bank financial institutions including trusts, brokers, insurance companies, and securities firms." They are used by both private investors and corporations. In China, financial firms operate as trust companies, mainly though managing assets and investing for clients. The last decade of Chinese regulatory action has attempted to slow the use of trusts by banks, as the funds raised through trust products are often channeled to riskier borrowers through trust loans. In 2012, the trust industry became the second largest sub-sector of China's financial industry, totalling over ¥7.47 trillion, which was cited as having grown to ¥12.48 trillion in June 2014.

=== Entrusted Loans ===
Entrusted loans are loans between companies with a bank serving as the intermediary. The primary reason for entrusted loans is because Chinese legislation has banned loans between companies. These loans operate on the assumption that the credit risk lies on whoever is lending in the arrangement. In this sense, the loan ends up on the book of the banks, rather than on the books of the company. In 2013, the size of the entrusted loan industry was identified to be approximately ¥8.551 trillion.

=== Alternative Financing ===
Alternative financing primarily relates to shadow banking activity involving smaller investments, and smaller, often rural investors and borrowers. It includes peer-to-peer lending, micro-financing, pawnshop financing, and financial leasing.

== Regulatory bodies ==
The main bodies responsible for regulating shadow banking in China include The People's Bank (PBC), the Chinese Banking Regulatory Commission, the China Insurance Regulatory Commissions (CIRC) and the State Administration Foreign Exchange. In 2017, the Chinese State Council established the Financial Stability and Development Committee, in order to increase coordination between financial regulators and cover areas that the larger bodies could not. Internationally, China is a signatory to the FSB's Standing Committee on Supervisory and Regulatory Cooperation. Under the Law of the People's Republic of China, the People's Bank of China is given the power to implement monetary policy, attempt to avoid financial risks and maintain stability in financial markets. The Chinese Banking Regulatory Commission and the Chinese Insurance Regulatory Commission are viewed to have supervisory roles over financial markets within China, rather than having legislative power.

== Regulation ==
Chinese shadow banking is regulated by several domestic and international guidelines and pieces of legislation. The domestic law that legislates the practice and policing of shadow banking in China include the Law of the People's Republic of China on the People's Bank of China and the Commercial Bank Law of the People's Republic of China from the Standing Committee of the National People's Congress. Also, the Chinese Banking Regulatory Commission release opinions and notices on the law relating to shadow banking, including the Management Rules of Entrusted Loans of Commercial Banks and the Notice of the Chinese Banking Regulatory Commission on Printing and Distributing Administrative Measures for Commercial Bank Entrusted Loans. Internationally, China is a signatory to the Basel Committee which engages in setting standards and oversight for international regulation, most recently through the Basel III framework in 2017. In January 2018, the China Banking Regulatory Commission published a draft regulation aiming to align China with the Basel Committee on Banking Supervision's standards for commercial banks' large exposures. Specifically, this meant that banks' exposure to unidentified counter-party risk within the underlying assets of structured investments needed to be brought below 15% of the banks' Tier 1 capital before the end of 2018.

Within domestic regulation, there are several areas that are associated with shadow banking. For example, the PBC has control over interest rates within China, which is identified as one of the reasons for small to medium enterprises being unable to source funding in China. Moreover, the Commercial Bank Law of the PRC bans companies from loaning money to each other, again a documented reason as to why companies within China engage in shadow banking in the form of entrusted loans. In recent times, there have been several significant changes in Chinese regulation with respect to shadow banking. These efforts have caused the Chinese shadow banking sector to shrink by approximately ¥16 trillion over since 2017. Chinese regulatory authorities have stated they remain committed to decreasing risk, limiting regulatory arbitrage, and opening up conventional capital lines to decrease shadow banking activity into the future.

=== Removal of the Reserve Ratio ===
The Reserve Ratio was a Chinese commercial banking law that stipulated banks could only lend a maximum of 75% of their capital deposits at any one time. This policy was adopted in 1995 and was designed to prevent rapid growth of commercial bank's credit scale in order to control liquidity risks. Reserve Ratio requirements are identified as one of the key reasons financial institutions engaged in shadow banking, in order to loan out money above the 75% cap, without these loans showing up on their balance sheets. The removal of the Reserve Ratio requirement by the National People's Congress took effect in October 2015. This move was considered to be both an effort to stimulate economic growth and decrease shadow banking loans by freeing up banks to loan out the rest of their capital through conventional avenues.

=== Increased oversight ===
In January 2018, the China Banking Regulatory Commission stated that it would be increasing its supervision of shadow banking and interbank activities. Furthermore, the establishment of the Financial Stability and Development Committee in November 2017 was an extra step towards increased oversight over shadow banking activity. As well, there was a significant push to deleverage the Chinese financial sector following the 19th Communist party in late October 2017. Specifically, the Central Bank issued new guidelines tightening rules on asset management in China.

=== Criminalising loans with annual interest rates above 36% ===
In October 2019, the Chinese government criminalised lending at an annualised interest rate of above 36%. This move targeted the shadow banking sector because being able to charge higher interest rates is one of the central reasons financial institutions opt to engage in off-book loans as a form of shadow banking.

=== Measures on Entrusted Loans ===
In January 2018, the China Banking Regulatory Commission tightened regulations on banks and other financial institutions arranging entrusted loans. These measures included stopping banks from participating in the decision-making behind the loan, as well as barring them from providing guarantees of any kind on the financing itself. This move ensured that the corporations themselves were required to bear the credit risk of entrusted loans. This came as a response to the associated risks of the rapid growth within this industry as a form of shadow banking. At the time, the amount of money in entrusted loans was identified to be ¥13.9 trillion. This move was also intended to push credit back to conventional financing channels such as on-book loans and bonds from financial institutions.

=== Interest rate changes ===
In September 2019, the Central Bank of China announced their intention to decrease market interest rates in an effort to support economic growth within China. This is identified as being partially in response to the trade war with the United States. A statement released by the monetary policy committee of the People's Bank at the time is quoted as saying:

We must spare no effort to improve monetary policy transmission and insist on market-oriented reforms to promote a noticeable decline in real interest rates...We should make flexible use of multiple monetary tools to maintain reasonably ample liquidity. At the same time, [we should] deepen interest rate liberalisation, improve the loan prime rate regime and promote its use in practice.

This move involved decreasing the loan prime rate (LPR), which represents the average interest rate offered by a group of 18 banks in China. The loan prime rate is intended to serve as the benchmark for all lending. Dropping the LPR was identified as one of the methods for decreasing shadow banking activity, as it allows for more borrowers to access lines of capital.

== See also ==
- Financial services in China
- Banking in China
