= Evergrande Group =

Chinese property development company (1996–2024)

China Evergrande Group 中国恒大集团

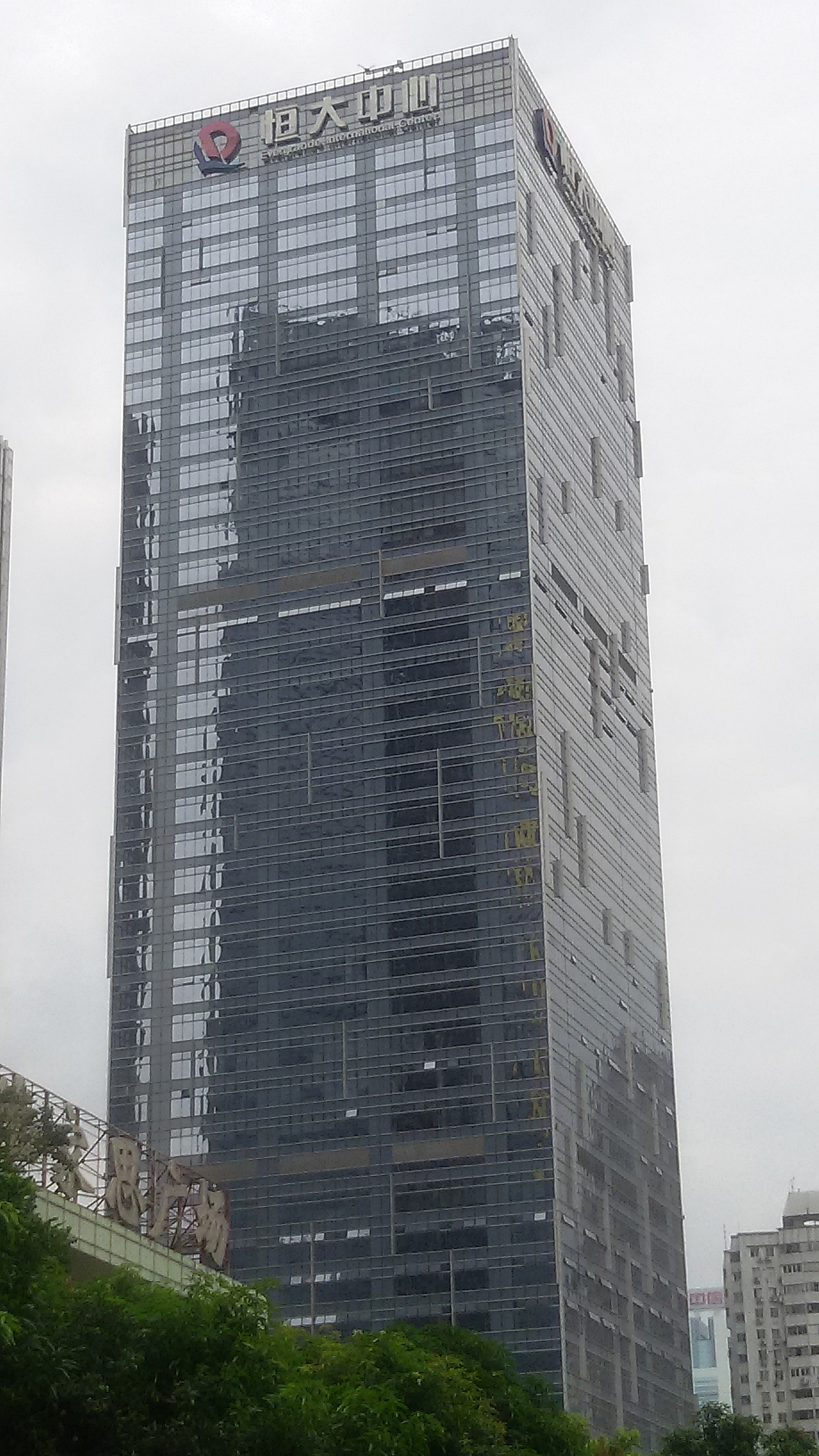
- Guangzhou Evergrande Center
- Type: Public
- Traded as: SEHK: 3333
- Industry: Real estate
- Founded: 1996; 30 years ago
- Founder: Hui Ka Yan (Xu Jiayin)
- Defunct: January 2024
- Fate: Delisted from Hong Kong Stock Exchange, liquidated
- Headquarters: Shenzhen, Guangdong, China
- Area served: Mainland China
- Key people: Hui Ka Yan (Chairman)
- Revenue: ▲CN¥507.250 billion (US$77.713 billion, 2020)
- Operating income: ▼CN¥63.520 billion (US$9.732 billion, 2020)
- Net income: ▼CN¥8.076 billion (US$1.238 billion, 2020)
- Total assets: ▲CN¥2,301 trillion (US$306.410 billion, 2020)
- Total equity: ▼CN¥350.431 billion (US$53.687 billion, 2020)
- Number of employees: 123,276 (31 December 2020)
- Subsidiaries: Hengda Real Estate Evergrande New Energy Auto
- Website: evergrande.com

China Evergrande Group
- Simplified Chinese: 中国恒大集团
- Traditional Chinese: 中國恆大集團
Transcriptions
Standard Mandarin
- Hanyu Pinyin: Zhōngguó Héngdà Jítuán
- Wade–Giles: Heng2-ta4 Chi2-t'uan2
Yue: Cantonese
- Yale Romanization: jūng gwok hàhng daaih jaahp tyùhn
- Jyutping: zung1 gwok3 hang4 daai6 zaap6 tyun4
- IPA: [hɐŋ˩.taj˨.tsap̚˨.tʰyn˩]

The China Evergrande Group was a Chinese property development company. Before its dissolution in 2024, it had become the second largest property developer in China by sales and the most valuable real estate company worldwide. Evergrande's sudden collapse in 2021 sparked the ongoing Chinese property sector crisis.

Evergrande was founded in 1996 by Hui Ka Yan (Xu Jiayin). It sold apartments mostly to upper- and middle-income earners. Evergrande was incorporated in the Cayman Islands, a British Overseas Territory, and headquartered in the Houhai Financial Center in Nanshan District, Shenzhen, Guangdong Province, China.

By 2017 Evergrande had become the second largest property developer by sales in China. In 2018, Evergrande became the most valuable real estate company in the world, but by 2021 it had collapsed financially and started the Chinese property sector crisis under Xi Jinping's policy. The company eventually filed for bankruptcy in the United States in 2023. On 29 January 2024, the company was wound up by the High Court of Hong Kong.

On 24 August 2025, Evergrande was delisted from the Stock Exchange of Hong Kong (SEHK) after more than 15 years of trading, following years of financial distress, missed debt payments and an ongoing restructuring process. On 20 August 2026, Hui Ka Yan was sentenced to life in prison and ordered to forfeit all personal assets.

== History ==
Initially called the Hongda Group, Evergrande was founded by Hui Ka Yan in the southern Chinese city of Guangzhou in 1996, during a period of mass urbanization in China. In October 2009, the company raised US$722 million in an initial public offering on the SEHK.

In 2021, the payments Evergrande had to make on its debt started the Chinese property sector crisis; Evergrande's total debts were estimated in the hundreds of billions of dollars. This was one of the reasons for a drop in many stock market indices on 20 September 2021. At the end of 2021, the Chinese government was reportedly working to restructure Evergrande in order to resolve the crisis. The group also sought a moratorium on the early repayment option on one of its yuan-denominated bonds from its bondholders on 7 January 2022.

In 2022, the company announced it would move its headquarters to Guangzhou due to a need to reduce spending. In April 2022, Reuters reported that construction had been started again at many projects and that the company still had liabilities of US$300 billion.

On 17 July 2023, Evergrande made public that it had made a net loss attributable to shareholders of 476 billion yuan (US$66.3 billion) for 2021 and of 105.9 billion yuan (US$14.7 billion) for 2022. The group stated that its total liabilities on 31 December 2022 stood at 2.43 trillion yuan (roughly US$340 billion). Court hearings on the restructuring of the group's debts were to be held in July 2023 in Hong Kong and the Caribbean. On 17 August 2023, Evergrande filed for Chapter 15 of the U.S. bankruptcy code for protection from creditors, with the U.S. bankruptcy court in Manhattan. On 28 August 2023, Evergrande stock plunged in Hong Kong as trading resumed after a 17-month suspension, tumbling by 79 per cent to 35 HK cents, as opposed to the pre-suspension price of HK$1.65 on 21 March 2022. In September 2023, Bloomberg reported that Hui Ka Yan (Xu Jiayin), the billionaire chairman of Evergrande, was placed under police control. Caixin reported that Xia Haijun, an ex-chief executive officer of Evergrande, and Pan Darong, a former chief financial officer, were detained by Chinese authorities.

On 29 January 2024, the High Court of Hong Kong made a winding-up order against Evergrande due to a lack of a viable restructuring plan. Trading was halted for stocks in China Evergrande, China Evergrande New Energy Vehicle Group, and Evergrande Property Services. The Hong Kong court order came after bondholders decided that winding down Evergrande was better than Evergrande's plan to give control of most of the developer to Chinese banks and impose losses on foreign creditors. It was thought by investors that the restructuring plan would cause losses that would have potentially been steep enough that the losses of foreign creditors would be lower if Evergrande liquidated.

The court order allowed liquidators from Alvarez and Marsal to take over all of Evergrande's subsidiaries around the world so that Evergrande's assets could be sold to repay its debt. However, 90% of Evergrande's assets were in mainland China and most of the assets had already been sold, pledged to Chinese domestic creditors, or frozen by Chinese banks at the time.

Evergrande stated on 19 March 2024 that the China Securities Regulatory Commission (CSRC) had found that the company had overstated its revenue in 2019 by 214 billion yuan (nearly $30 billion), or about half, and in 2020 its revenue was overstated by nearly 80%, or 350 billion yuan ($48.6 billion). The CSRC also suspected problems with the bonds Evergrande issued. The regulator fined Evergrande 4.2 billion yuan ($579.5 million) for falsifying its revenue, among other financial misconduct.

In August 2026, a Chinese court sentenced Hui Ka Yan, the founder of the Evergrande Group, to life imprisonment for financial fraud, corruption, and embezzlement, and imposed a total fine of 15.8 billion yuan (2.35 billion US dollars) on Evergrande and its real estate division.

== Operations and business interests ==
=== Automotive ===
In 2018, Evergrande acquired a 45% stake in electric vehicle company Faraday Future for $2 billion through its Evergrande Health subsidiary.

In July 2019, the company partnered with State Grid Corporation of China to develop electric vehicle charging stations. Later in November 2019, Evergrande announced that it would invest ¥45 billion (approximately US$6.4 billion) over the following three years to develop new energy vehicles, build three production bases in Nansha, Guangzhou and Shanghai, and launch electric vehicles branded as "Evergrande New Energy Vehicle" in 2020, creating the Hengchi electric vehicle brand.

In June 2020, Evergrande Group acquired the remaining 49% of NEVS for $380 million, after having acquired 51% of the shares for $931 million in 2019. Evergrande NEV has stated that it will start making electric cars by 2022.

On 14 August 2023, Evergrande Group received a $500 million strategic investment from NWTN Group.

In June 2024, Evergrande NEV was ordered by the Chinese government to return 1.9 billion yuan it had received as subsidies from the state due to the company's failure to meet contractual obligations.

=== Health ===
In March 2015, Evergrande acquired New Media Group Holdings and renamed it Evergrande Health. Evergrande Health Group operated the "Evergrande Health Valley" in Nanning. The Health Valley is a health and wellness park, and retirement community. Evergrande also worked with Brigham and Women's Hospital in Massachusetts to manage Boao Evergrande International Hospital in Hainan.

Evergrande Health was both a division and a listed company. However, the listed company portion was renamed into China Evergrande New Energy Vehicle Group Limited in August 2020.

As of 2021, the health division was still part of China Evergrande New Energy Vehicle Group Limited and in turn part of Evergrande Group.

=== Entertainment ===
HengTen Networks was formed in 2015 in partnership with Tencent. In October 2020, HengTen Networks announced that it would acquire Ruyi Pictures for HK$7.2 billion. In August 2021, the company sold a 7% stake in HengTen to Tencent for US$418 million. Later in 2021, Evergrande sold off its remaining stake in HengTen, ending their relationship with Tencent.

=== Finance ===
In November 2015, Evergrande acquired a 50% stake in Sino-Singapore Great Eastern Life Insurance Company for $617 million and changed its name to Evergrande Life. It also owns shares in Shengjing Bank. Evergrande has also sold wealth management products to consumers.

=== Food and agriculture ===
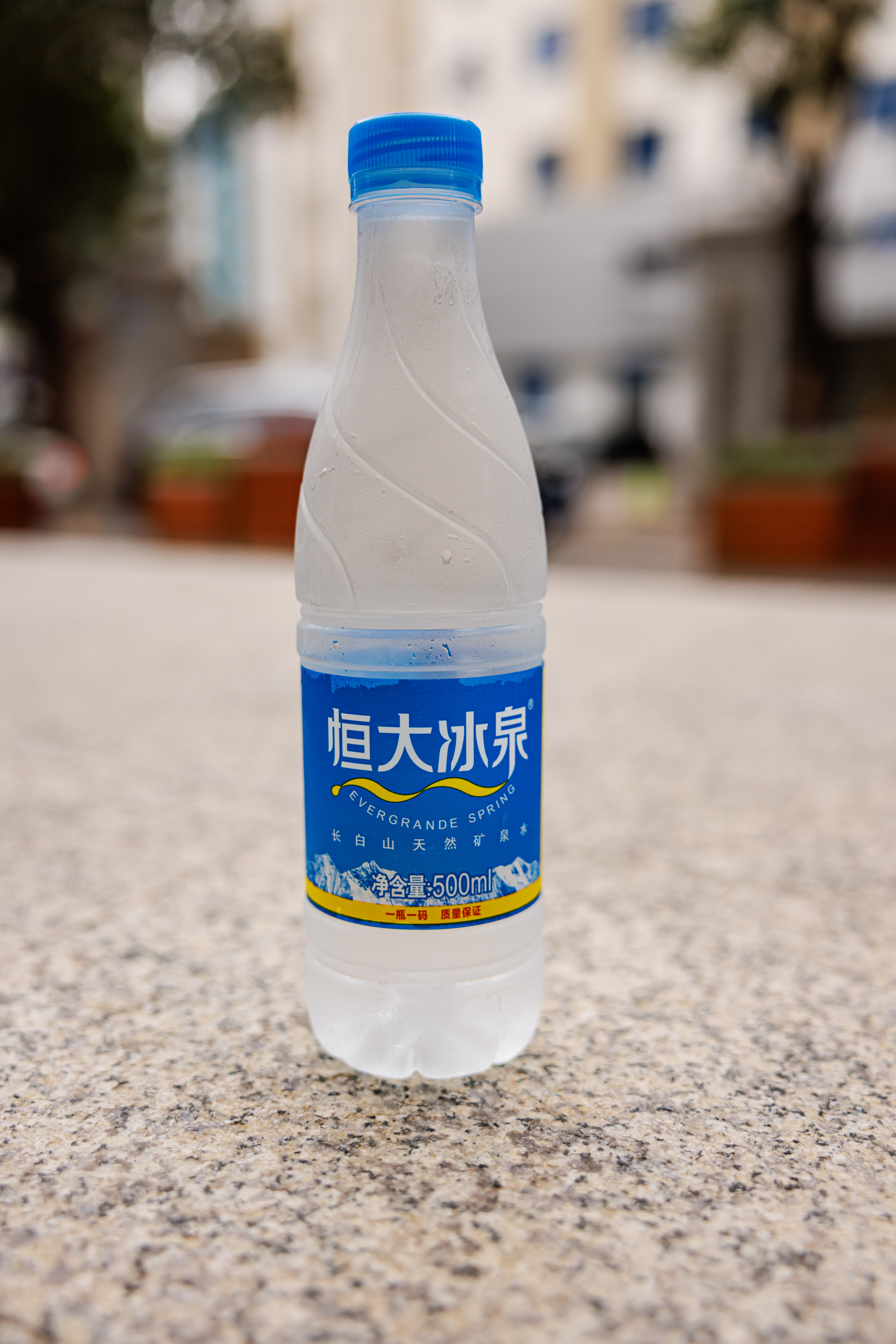
Evergrande Group mineral water brand "EVERGRANDE SPRING "

In 2014, Evergrande Group launched its "Hengda Bingquan" (later "Evergrande Spring") mineral water brand and invested ¥5.54 billion in it, including hiring Jackie Chan to promote the brand. Evergrande's water brand received significant negative attention from Korean consumers, as the water source on the label was listed as "Jang bai shan" (Changbai Mountains) rather than the Korean name "Mount Baekdusan." The use of the Chinese name of the mountain—which borders China and North Korea—is a point of stress between China and South Korea.

In September 2016, after a loss of ¥4 billion, Evergrande sold its agribusiness units, which included its mineral water brand, dairy business, and grain and oil business, for ¥2.7 billion. Later that year, Evergrande announced it was investing ¥300 million to build more than 110 pig farms in southwestern Guizhou province.

=== Real estate ===
Evergrande Group owned 565 million square meters (6,080 million square feet) of development land and real estate projects in 22 cities, including Guangzhou, Tianjin, Shenyang, Wuhan, Kunming, Chengdu, Chongqing, Nanjing, Zhengzhou, Luoyang, Changsha, Nanning, Xi'an, Taiyuan and Guiyang in mainland China. Notable projects by the company include Ocean Flower Island in Hainan.

Evergrande Real Estate is the second-largest real estate developer in mainland China. It is known as "Wan Heng Bi" with the other two top three real estate companies: Vanke (pinyin: Wànkē) and Country Garden (pinyin: Bìguìyuán). The firm has developed projects in over 170 cities in mainland China.

Evergrande Plaza, in Chengdu, was designed by Aedas, and completed in 2014.

=== Sports ===
In 2010, it acquired football club Guangzhou Evergrande F.C. and invested heavily to acquire top players. In 2013, under Marcello Lippi, the club won the 2013 AFC Champions League. Alibaba also has a 50% stake in the football club.

On 16 April 2020, Evergrande opened the construction of Guangzhou Evergrande Football Stadium in Xie Village, Panyu District, Guangzhou.

Evergrande Football School is a football tutoring school.

The company was a sponsor of the Women's Guangdong Evergrande Volleyball Club, terminating their contract after 8 years in October 2021.

=== Tourism and recreation ===
Evergrande owns two major theme park brands "Hengda children of the world", "Hengda water world", and Hainan has a large tourist complex "Chinese island of Hainan to spend". The under-construction Ocean Flower Island in Hainan is one of its major projects.

== Financial data per annual reports ==
Financial data in billion CNY. View chart definition.

Financial data in CNY (financial year ends on 31 December)
Year	Revenue	Net income	Assets	Equity
2010	45,801,401,000	8,024,676,000	104,452,464,000	21,366,225,000
2011	61,918,185,000	11,726,593,000	179,023,408,000	34,130,753,000
2012	65,260,838,000	9,181,921,000	238,990,551,000	41,691,325,000
2013	93,671,780,000	12,611,778,000	159,950,689,000	79,342,634,000
2014	111,398,112,000	12,604,053,000	206,225,229,000	112,378,004,000
2015	133,130,000,000	10,460,000,000	757,035,000,000	142,142,000,000
2016	211,444,000,000	5,091,000,000	1,350,868,000,000	192,532,000,000
2017	311,022,000,000	24,372,000,000	1,761,752,000,000	242,208,000,000
2018	466,196,000,000	37,390,000,000	1,880,028,000,000	308,626,000,000
2019	477,561,000,000	17,280,000,000	2,206,577,000,000	358,537,000,000
2020	507,248,000,000	8,076,000,000	2,301,159,000,000	350,431,000,000
2021	250,013,000,000	-476,035,000,000	2,107,096,000,000	-473,054,000,000
2022	230,067,000,000	-105,914,000,000	1,838,338,000,000	-599,074,000,000

== Financial problems and audits ==
In 2016, the Hong Kong Market Misconduct Tribunal suspended American short seller and Citron Research founder Andrew Left for five years, due to the publication of a highly critical report on the company, "finding him culpable of disclosing false or misleading information inducing transactions under the Securities and Futures Ordinance (SFO) in the publication of a research report on Evergrande Real Estate Group Limited (Evergrande) in June 2012." The trading ban "has raised concerns over freedom of speech in Hong Kong's financial markets" according to the New York Times.

The Chinese government initiated a major deleveraging campaign in 2016. Evergrande had been one of the most active Chinese developers in the global junk bond market, but after the 2016 campaign such avenues became more difficult for Evergrande and similarly situated developers. Evergrande responded by increasing its use of supply-side finance, seeking advanced payments from customers for unfinished apartments and expanding its borrowing from suppliers and contractors. The company was facing a liquidity crisis, even going so far as to encourage employees to purchase financial products from the company.

In 2020, CCP General Secretary Xi Jinping's government started to tighten the real estate market based on the principle that "property is to be lived in, not to be speculated on." He had previously articulated this principle during the 19th Party Congress and it led to a series of financial rules known as the three red lines. In an effort to curb risky borrowing by property development firms, the three red lines required that (1) developers have a liability-to-assets ratio of less than 70 percent, (2) a net gearing ratio of less than 100 percent, and (3) a cash to short-term debt ratio of at least one. Companies that complied with all three rules could increase their debt by 15 percent in the next year. New restrictions lead to a downturn in the property market, with sales declining by 30% in 2021.

Evergrande crossed all three red lines, resulting in a liquidity crisis and its later insolvency. In summer of 2021, payments due on its debt, estimated in the hundreds of billions of dollars, resulted in the Evergrande liquidity crisis. This was one of the reasons for a drop in many stock market indices on 20 September 2021.

On 15 October 2021, the accounting regulator in Hong Kong announced an investigation into PwC's auditing of Evergrande. PwC had signed off the 2020 accounts of Evergrande without reference to its uncertainties as a growing concern. Evergrade itself reported concerns as to continuing operations in its half-year accounts for 2021.

On 21 October 2021, Evergrande announced that a $2.6 billion asset sale that would have been used to pay an $83 million interest payment it missed in September, 2021 had failed to close. On 10 November 2021, Evergrande defaulted on 3 more bonds after missing the grace period for interest payments. A major news outlet reported they fulfilled the payments after the deadline.

In November 2021, although the scale of debt was huge, from the perspective of financial data alone, Evergrande had not yet reached the point of "insolvency". According to the aforementioned financial report, Evergrande's land reserve was worth RMB 456.8 billion, and together with 146 old reform projects, the total value of the land reserve was nearly RMB 2 trillion. In addition, there are many completed commercial properties and holdings, such as the headquarters building in Hong Kong, worth around RMB 10 billion.

On 17 December 2021, Evergrande was officially declared to be in default by S&P Global after missing a bond payment earlier in the month. On 3 January 2022, Evergrande shares were suspended from trading, without a reason being provided by the company. Trading resumed a day later and its stock price rose by 10%. On 15 March 2022, Evergrande's share price sank to a new all-time low of HK$1.16 (US$0.15), down from a high of over HK$31 in October 2017.

On 30 March 2022, Evergrande announced the decision to sell its Crystal City Project in Hangzhou for 3.66 billion yuan to Zhejiang Zhejian Real Estate Group and Zhejiang Construction Engineering Group, using the proceeds to repay construction debt of 920.7 million yuan to Zhejiang Construction Engineering. The deal is expected to post a gain of about 216 million yuan.

In January 2023, PwC quit in disagreement over the audit of Evergrande's 2021 accounts.

In July 2023 it became known that Evergrade made a loss of 476 billion yuan in 2021 and 106 billion yuan in 2022.

On 17 August 2023, Evergrande filed for Chapter 15 bankruptcy in New York.

On 28 September 2023, trading in Evergrande shares was suspended after a report was released stating that its chairman, Hui, was under police investigation for suspicion of crimes.

In February 2024, Evergrande liquidators prepared for a potential lawsuit against its former auditor PwC.

In September 2024 the Chinese authorities suspended PwC from operating in China for six months and fined the company CN¥ 441,000,000 (US$62 million). As of June 2025 at least 30 PwC partners in Hong Kong had left the company or were expected to, and 77 partners in mainland China had left since December 2024.

== See also ==
- Real estate in China
