= 19th National Congress of the Chinese Communist Party =

2017 Chinese Communist Party conference

19th National Congress of the Chinese Communist Party 中国共产党第十九次全国代表大会
- The flag of the Chinese Communist Party
- Begins: October 18, 2017
- Ends: October 24, 2017
- Locations: Great Hall of the People, Beijing, China
- Previous event: 18th National Congress of the Chinese Communist Party (2012)
- Next event: 20th National Congress of the Chinese Communist Party (2022)
- Participants: 2,280 delegates
- Major events: Election of the 19th Central Committee and 19th Central Commission for Discipline Inspection
- Leader: Xi Jinping (Leader of the Chinese Communist Party)
- Website: 19th.cpcnews.cn

19th National Congress of the Chinese Communist Party
- Simplified Chinese: 中国共产党第十九次全国代表大会
- Traditional Chinese: 中國共產黨第十九次全國代表大會
Transcriptions
Standard Mandarin
- Hanyu Pinyin: Zhōngguó Gòngchǎndǎng Dìshíjiǔcì Quánguó Dàibiǎo Dàhuì

Abbreviation
- Chinese: 十九大
Transcriptions
Standard Mandarin
- Hanyu Pinyin: Shíjiǔ Dà

The 19th National Congress of the Chinese Communist Party was held at the Great Hall of the People, Beijing, between 18 and 24 October 2017. 2,280 delegates represented the party's estimated 89 million members.

Preparations for the 19th National Congress began in 2016 and ended with a plenary session of the Central Committee a few days prior to the Congress. In 2016, local and provincial party organizations began electing delegates to the congress as well as receiving and amending party documents. During the congress, a new guiding ideology, labeled Xi Jinping Thought on Socialism with Chinese Characteristics for a New Era, was written into the party's constitution. It marked the first time since Mao Zedong Thought that a living party leader had enshrined into the party constitution an ideology named after himself. The Congress also emphasized strengthening socialism with Chinese characteristics, Party building, socialist rule of law, and setting concrete timelines for achieving development goals, such as building a moderately prosperous society and achieving "socialist modernization." It was also noted for rallying China to play a more substantial role internationally. The congress was also notable for the consolidation of power under Xi Jinping.

The 19th National Congress endorsed the membership list of the Central Commission for Discipline Inspection and elected the 19th Central Committee, which in turn approved the members of the Politburo and its Standing Committee. Five members of the 18th Politburo Standing Committee left the body due to having reached retirement age, and five new members joined the 19th Standing Committee: Li Zhanshu, Wang Yang, Wang Huning, Zhao Leji, and Han Zheng.

== Background and preparation ==
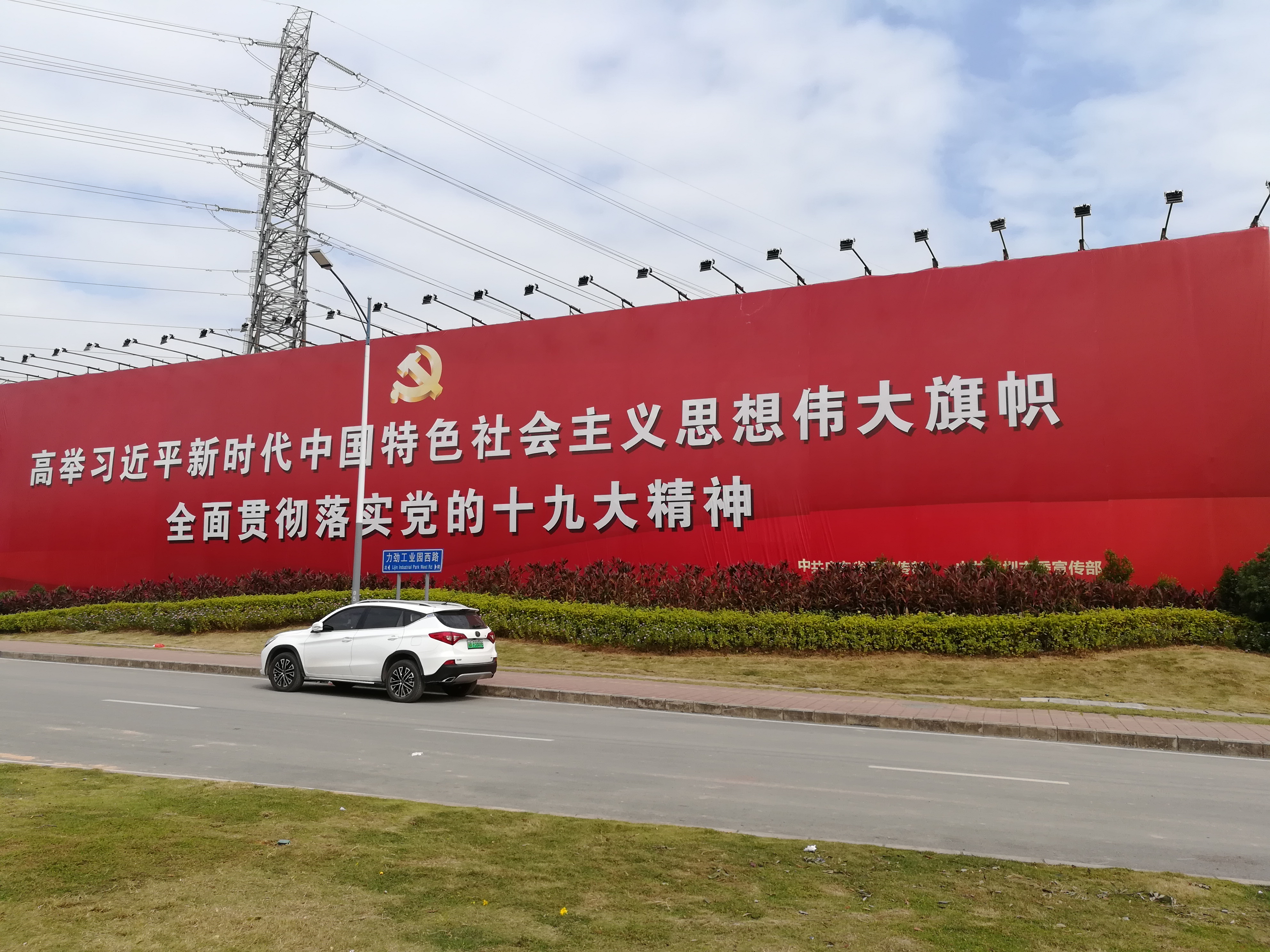
A political slogan on the wall in Longhua District, Shenzhen, Guangdong, China, which reads: Holding high the "great banner of socialism with Chinese characteristics for a New Era. We should fully implement the spirit of the 19th CPC National Congress." Holding high the "great banner of socialism with Chinese characteristics for a New Era" is one of the symbols of The 19th CCP National Congress, which has been written in the history book.

The drafting process of the Report of the 18th Central Committee began in mid-to-late 2016, probably before the 6th Plenary Session. Normal procedure is that the sitting Politburo appoints a drafting committee that is responsible for researching major topics and can establish investigative research teams. The Draft Report is sent to party groups, such as the provincial party organisation, to government institutions, the People's Liberation Army and select mass organisations while the drafting committee consults with leading specialists. The 6th Plenary Session of the 18th Central Committee, which sat 24–27 October 2016, in its communique stated that the 19th National Congress would be held in Beijing in the second half of 2017. The drafting process continued after the 6th Plenary Session, and by summer 2017, forums for party and non-party members in Beijing were established to review the draft report. At some point in the process, retired party elders are consulted.

The 7th Plenary Session convened on 11 October and was in session until 14 October 2017. 191 CC full members and 141 CC alternate members attended the session, with CCDI members attended in a non-voting capacity. The 7th Plenary Session laid the groundworks for the 19th National Congress, and publicised the date of its convocation. The 18th Politburo put forward a motion to the 7th Plenary Session of sending three documents to the 19th National Congress; the Report of the 18th Central Committee, Work Report of the 18th Central Commission for Discipline Inspection and amendments to the CCP constitution. Xi Jinping presented the report of the 18th Central Committee while Liu Yunshan presented the amendments to the CCP constitution to the 7th Plenary Session. The Work Report of the 18th CCDI had been presented by Wang Qishan at the 8th CCDI Plenary Session on 9 October, and sent to the 7th Plenary Session for approval.

The Draft Report of the 18th Central Committee was sent to more than 4,700 individuals for review, who represented various regions and departments. Six symposiums to hear opinions and suggestions on the draft report were organised, and Xi attended them. The 7th Plenary Session approved the documents. (Note: The Report of the 18th Central Committee was given the title "Secure a decisive victory in building a moderately prosperous society in all respects and strive for the great success of socialism with Chinese characteristics for a new era".)

Three days later, on 17 October, the preparatory meeting was convened and presided over by Xi. 2,307 of the 19th National Congress delegates attended the meeting. It elected 22 individuals to the Credential Committee, 243 members to the Presidium of the 19th National Congress and Liu Yunshan was elected as the Secretary-General of the 19th National Congress. In addition, the attendees also approved the organizational setup and tasks of the secretariat of the congress. Tuo Zhen, the Deputy Head of the Publicity Department and main spokesperson for the 19th National Congress, publicised the agenda of the 19th National Congress, which had been approved by the preparatory meeting. The agenda was:

- To hear and examine a report submitted by the 18th CCP Central Committee;
- To examine a work report of the 18th Central Commission for Discipline Inspection;
- To deliberate and adopt an amendment to the Party's Constitution;
- To elect the Party's 19th Central Committee and its 19th Central Commission for Discipline.

=== Delegates ===
The election of delegates to the 19th National Congress started on 8 November 2016 and ended in June 2017, when the 18th Central Committee had approved the quota, needed qualifications and the election procedure. The criteria of becoming a delegate became "tougher" due to the ongoing anti-corruption campaign. As set forth by the 18th central Committee, a delegate is required to "be highly qualified politically and ideologically, have good work and life styles, be competent in discussing state affairs, and have been successful in their work."

The delegates are elected from 40 electoral units. Of the 40 electoral units, 34 are divided by a defined geographical area and six units are for the central party and government. The People's Liberation Army makes up one of the six central units and is the largest in term of delegate quota. One electoral unit represents the departments directly subordinate to the Central Committee and another state-owned economy. The quote on the number of delegates can elect does not reflect population size or party size in the given region. Rather, it reflects the political importance of the given region or subject. For instance, Shanghai has historically sent the highest number of delegates to the party congresses among regional electoral units.

Delegates are elected at local congresses of local party committees. The election process is competitive up to a point, with 15% of preliminary nominees being voted off by members during the election process. For instance, of the delegates elected at local party congresses of the Jiangxi Provincial Committee nominated 90 people. The quota for the Jiangxi electoral unit was 69. In this given unit there was 30% more candidates than seats. Once nominated, the candidates are reviewed by Central Committee through the Organization Department. The remaining delegates will then have to stand for election at the provincial party congress, and the winners represented their electoral unit at the 19th National Congress.

In the election of 2016–2017 99.2% of party members participated in the election process, and increase of 1.2% since the last congress. 2,287 delegates were elected according to Xinhua News Agency in early October, an increase of 30 delegates since the 18th National Congress. However, the number was reduced to 2,280 in an announcement on 17 October. Of the delegates, 24.1% were women and 11.5% were ethnic minorities. The number of delegates who represented or were active in frontline production and manufacturing (a category which includes workers, farmers, and technicians) made up 771 delegates (33.7%, an increase of 3.2% from the 18th National Congress).

== The Congress ==
On 18 October, Premier Li Keqiang announced the opening of the conference. At the opening session, General Secretary Xi Jinping gave a political report titled "Secure a Decisive Victory in Building a Moderately Prosperous Society in All Respects and Strive for the Great Success of Socialism with Chinese Characteristics for a New Era". Xi said the CCP had achieved "significant advances on the theoretical and cultural fronts" and "strengthened Party leadership over ideological work and explored new ground in advancing Party-related theories”; with the result being “the importance of Marxism as a guiding ideology is better appreciated". He said:

In the five years since the 18th Party Congress, we have ... strengthened the Party's leadership over ideological work and comprehensively pushed forward the innovation of the Party's theories in all respects, consolidating the leadership status of Marxism in the ideological sphere .... Today, we are closer to the goal of the great rejuvenation of the Chinese nation than any other period in history, and we are more confident and able to achieve this .... Our Party must always be the vanguard of the times, the backbone of the nation, and a ruling Marxist party .... Only socialism can save China, only the reform and opening up can develop China, develop socialism, and develop Marxism .... The whole party must ... uphold Marxism, firmly consolidate the grand ideal of communism and the common ideal of socialism with Chinese characteristics, cultivate and practice core socialist values, and relentlessly strengthen the Party's dominance and discursive power in the ideological sphere .... The power of truth emanating from Chinese Marxism of the 21st century will certainly be stronger and more persuasive .... We must push forward the Sinification of Marxism and bring it in tune with the time. We can then popularize it to construct a socialist ideology with impressive cohesive power and guidance power, such that the entire population will be tightly united in their goals, values, and moral viewpoints.

He mentioned "the scientific truth of Marxism–Leninism", which he said saved China from "passivity" which resulted in a country "taking the initiative". Xi called on to "ensure our theory evolves with the times, deepening our appreciation of the objective laws" of Marxism. The Congress declared that China and the CCP entered a "new era of socialism with Chinese characteristics" at the 18th National Congress, which it said was both consistent with and significantly different from the past nearly 40 years of reform and opening up. Xi stated that it is "the question of an era to which our answer must be a systematic combination of theory and practice that addresses what kind of socialism with Chinese characteristics the new era requires us to uphold and develop, and how we should go about doing it". He added:

In answering this question, our Party has continued to uphold dialectical and historical materialism; has considered carefully the new conditions of the era and the new requirements of practice; and has adopted an entirely new perspective to deepen its understanding of the laws that underlie governance by a Communist party, the development of socialism, and the evolution of human society. It has . . . achieved major theoretical innovations, ultimately giving shape to the Thought on Socialism with Chinese Characteristics for a New Era.

Xi stated that the CCP "has continued to uphold dialectical and historical materialism", adding that "Chinese socialism’s entrance into a new era, in the history of the development of the People’s Republic of China and the history of the development of the Chinese nation, is of tremendous importance. In the history of the development of international socialism and the history of the development of human society it is of tremendous importance" and stating "if we respond to the call of our times and have the courage to uphold truth and correct errors, the Marxism of twenty first-century China will, without a doubt, emanate a more mighty, more compelling power of truth".

Xi laid out a comprehensive approach to China's developmental path. While the speech reflected an updating of some policy issues that had been on the Party's agenda, it put forward a more concrete implementation strategy. Xi stated that economic challenges must be addressed within a "five-sphere integrated of plan" that was (1) political, (2) cultural, (3) economic, (4) social, and (5) ecological. The immediate economic task Xi described was supply-side structural reform, focusing on the reduction of excess capacity, eliminating excess homebuilding surplus, reducing debt, and decreasing costs. Xi warned against complacency and described "Three Critical Battles" that required focus: de-risking, poverty alleviation, and pollution control.

The 19th National Congress re-affirmed the goal of transitioning solely state-owned enterprises towards mixed (both state and private) ownership. Xi stated the primary contradiction of China's conditions in the new era as "the contradiction between the people's ever-growing need for a better life and unbalanced and inadequate development." In this context, "unbalanced" refers to rural-urban inequalities, regional inequalities, inequalities between the rich and poor, and structural imbalances in the economy. "Inadequate" refers to household income share. Xi said:

We must recognize that the evolution of the principal contradiction facing Chinese society represents a historic shift that affects the whole landscape and that creates many new demands for the work of the Party and the country. Building on continued efforts to sustain development, we must devote great energy to addressing development’s imbalances and inadequacies... With this, we will be better placed to meet the ever-growing economic, political, cultural, social, and ecological needs of our people.

With regard to China's property sector, Xi stated that "houses are for living, not for speculation." These remarks were later part of the basis for the three red lines rule. With regard to international relations, Xi stated that China sought to promote coordination and cooperation with the other major powers and stated that China does not seek hegemonism or expansion. As part of his stance on the Sinicization of Chinese religion, Xi stated at the Congress, "We will fully implement the Party's basic policy on religious affairs, uphold the principle that religions in China must be Chinese in orientation and provide active guidance to religions so that they can adapt themselves to a socialist society." He added that by 2049, "China will have become a leading nation in the world in terms of its comprehensive national power and the level of its international influence".

Xi concluded the report by stating "Theory is fundamental to Party building... Our top priority in building the Party through theory... is to make all Party members keep firmly in mind the Party’s purpose, have unwavering convictions as Communists, resolve the fundamental issue of the worldview, outlook on life, and values we should embrace, and maintain deep belief in and faithfully practice Communism and socialism with Chinese characteristics".

The congress duly elected the party's leading bodies, including the Central Committee and the Central Commission for Discipline Inspection, the internal discipline organ that has come to the political foreground since 2012.

=== Party Constitution amendments ===
The Congress ratified changes to the Constitution of the Chinese Communist Party, including the incorporation of Xi Jinping Thought. Xi thus became the first leader since Deng Xiaoping to append his name into party ideology; the change also led to many international media outlets calling Xi the "most powerful leader since Mao." The Belt and Road Initiative was also added to the party constitution. The terms Four Confidences, Chinese Dream, new concept for development, Four Comprehensives, Xi Jinping Thought on Strengthening the Military, Community of Common Destiny, Four Consciousnesses and the Party leads everything were also added to the Party constitution.

=== First plenary session ===
In the immediate aftermath of the congress, the Central Committee formally elected the 25-member Politburo, the 7-member Politburo Standing Committee, the general secretary of the Central Committee, and a new, scaled down Central Military Commission. As expected, Xi Jinping duly renewed his term as general secretary of the Chinese Communist Party, the party's top position and the de facto top office of China. Before the congress, speculation mounted on whether one of the younger officials already on the Politburo, such as Guangdong party secretary Hu Chunhua or Chongqing party secretary Sun Zhengcai, would be elevated to the Politburo Standing Committee, the party's top decision-making body, in preparation for their assuming overall leadership of the party in 2022. However, in July 2017, Sun was abruptly removed from office and then expelled from the party, upsetting the carefully calibrated balance prior to the opening of the congress.

==== Politburo Standing Committee ====
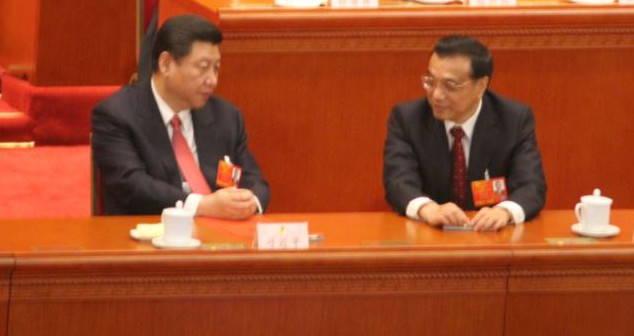
On the Politburo Standing Committee, Xi Jinping (left) and Li Keqiang (right) renewed their terms, while five new members joined

The Politburo Standing Committee is generally considered to be the most powerful decision-making body in China. Since 16th National Congress in 2002, its membership selection had become largely institutionalized, with mandatory retirement of any member who has reached the age of 68 at the time of a party congress. This informal precedent was retained at the 19th Congress. All five of the seven members of the 18th Politburo Standing Committee who were 68 or older at the time of the congress relinquished their seats (birth year in parentheses): Zhang Dejiang (1946), Yu Zhengsheng (1945), Liu Yunshan (1947), Wang Qishan (1948) and Zhang Gaoli (1946).

Although the retirement of four members of retirement age was not in doubt, there was speculation prior to the Congress that Wang Qishan, 69 years old at the time of the Congress, would stay on for another term as the anti-corruption chief. Wang made a media appearance in 2016 during which he stated that he was anticipating retiring soon due to his age, though it did not reduce the speculation. Ultimately, Wang retired from all party bodies at the congress, but became vice-president, a largely symbolic position, in 2018, signaling that he would continue to play a limited role in state affairs.

Xi and Li Keqiang renewed their terms on the Politburo Standing Committee; five new members joined, listed below in order of precedence.

- Li Zhanshu (born 1950) – seen as a major Xi confidant, promoted from head of the General Office directly to the number-three post in the party; he eventually became Chairman of the Standing Committee of the National People's Congress in March 2018 and also held the portfolio overseeing Hong Kong affairs.
- Wang Yang (born 1955) – former party secretary of Chongqing and Guangdong province and one of the vice premiers of the State Council; Wang joined the Politburo in 2007; seen as one of the more liberal members of the ruling elite, Wang was speculated as a candidate for the 18th standing committee but ultimately was not selected.
- Wang Huning (born 1955) – a major figure in charge of theory and ideology in the Communist Party, Wang Huning became the first theorist and ideologue to join the top rung of the party leadership since 1978; at the Congress, he was named the top-ranked Secretary of the Secretariat. Wang was also the only member of the Standing Committee without experience as a provincial-level party secretary
- Zhao Leji (born 1957) – head of the Organization Department prior to the Congress, Zhao was promoted to take reins of the Central Commission for Discipline Inspection, the party's main anti-corruption body
- Han Zheng (born 1955) – party secretary of Shanghai prior to the Congress; generally seen as having had a strong technocratic record; also marked a continuation of a line Shanghai party secretaries who were promoted to the standing committee.

The list was consistent with that released by the Hong Kong-based South China Morning Post on 22 October, showing that external media sources continued to have access to the last-minute deliberations of the Beijing leadership.

==== Politburo ====
According to convention, Politburo members entering the body in 2017 must be born after 1950. Three members of the outgoing Politburo, Liu Qibao, Zhang Chunxian, and Li Yuanchao, were not elected to the incoming Politburo even though they met the relevant age requirements. Liu and Zhang continued to hold seats in the Central Committee and were eventually given ceremonial positions with the CPPCC and NPC, respectively. Li Yuanchao did not secure a seat on the Central Committee and retired from politics altogether. All members of the 18th Politburo born prior to 1950 retired without exception. Hu Chunhua, Xu Qiliang and Sun Chunlan returned to the Politburo for a second term, while Cai Qi, who was not even part of the outgoing Central Committee, vaulted directly into the Politburo. Taking into account Standing Committee members who were all promoted from the Politburo level, the changes represented a 60% turnover of membership between the 18th and 19th Politburo. Out of a total of fifteen 'open' seats, at least ten of the individuals promoted to fill them were close associates of Xi.

The full list of Politburo members (excluding Standing Committee) was:

- Ding Xuexiang (born 1961) – a political aide to Xi for nearly a decade, Ding was named chief of the General Office of the Chinese Communist Party, effectively Xi's chief of staff
- Wang Chen (born 1950) – Vice Chairperson of the Standing Committee of the National People's Congress
- Liu He (born 1952) – head of the Office for Financial and Economic Affairs (Zhongcaiban), has been an important economic advisor to Xi
- Xu Qiliang (born 1950) – vice chairman of the Central Military Commission, retained his office for a second term
- Sun Chunlan (born 1950) – second term, only woman on the Politburo
- Li Xi (born 1956) – party secretary of Guangdong, considered an ally of Xi
- Li Qiang (born 1958) – party secretary of Shanghai, former subordinate of Xi Jinping in Zhejiang province
- Li Hongzhong (born 1956) – party secretary of Tianjin; Li has experience as party secretary of the Special Economic Zone of Shenzhen, and governor and party secretary of Hubei province.
- Yang Jiechi (born 1950) – first "foreign affairs specialist" to enter the Politburo since Qian Qichen
- Yang Xiaodu (born 1953) – party discipline official, Minister of Supervision
- Zhang Youxia (born 1950) – vice chairman of the Central Military Commission, first term
- Chen Xi (born 1953) – head of the Organization Department, friend of Xi from Tsinghua University
- Chen Quanguo (born 1955) – former subordinate of Li Keqiang in Henan, party secretary of Tibet (2011–16), party secretary of Xinjiang beginning in 2016;
- Chen Min'er (born 1960) – party secretary of Chongqing, former subordinate of Xi in Zhejiang
- Hu Chunhua (born 1963) – retained his seat for a second term, remained the youngest member of the Politburo
- Guo Shengkun (born 1954) – Secretary of the Political and Legal Affairs Commission, promoted as expected from Minister of Public Security
- Huang Kunming (born 1956) – head of the Publicity Department, considered an associate of Xi
- Cai Qi (born 1955) – party secretary of Beijing, Cai was rapidly promoted in the years leading up to the 19th Congress; considered an ally of Xi

==== Secretariat ====
The day-to-day executive organ of the Politburo, the Secretariat, also saw significant turnover; the Politburo members in charge of the propaganda and organization departments, and the General Office chief typically held a seat on the Secretariat. The likely areas of purview for each secretary are listed along with their names. All members of the 19th Secretariat are also concurrently members of the Politburo, with the sole exception of You Quan.

- Wang Huning (also a member of the Politburo Standing Committee)
- Ding Xuexiang, General Office
- Yang Xiaodu, Central Commission for Discipline Inspection
- Chen Xi, Organization Department
- Guo Shengkun, Political and Legal Affairs Commission
- Huang Kunming, Publicity Department
- You Quan, United Front Department

==== Central Committee ====
The Central Committee, composed of 204 members, was elected on 24 October 2017. Like previous congresses, the "more candidates than seats" elections method was used. 8% of candidates were rejected by delegate vote - the same ratio from the 18th National Congress in 2012. Since 2007 the higher ranks of the party apparatus has seen its median age increase while retaining retirement limits. The 19th Central Committee showed a continuation of this trend; Lu Hao (born 1967), the youngest full member of the previous CC, remained its youngest member. 78 members of the 18th CC were named to the 19th CC, while 32 alternate members of the 18th CC were elected to full membership of the 19th CC.

== See also ==
- 18th National Congress of the Chinese Communist Party
- 20th National Congress of the Chinese Communist Party
