= Chinese mortgage boycott =

Ongoing housing protest in China

The Chinese mortgage boycott is an ongoing mass protest in the People's Republic of China primarily in response to delayed and substandard property development from China Evergrande Group, the second-largest property development firm in China by market capitalization alongside other property development corporations.

The boycott was initiated by homebuyers who had been paying mortgages for properties within China Evergrande Group's Dynasty Mansion real estate development project located in Jingdezhen, Jiangxi province in southeast China. Angered by the lack of progress in erecting the building itself and the financial drain of paying mortgages on unfinished homes, prospective tenants released a public letter wherein they threatened to cease repaying their mortgage loans unless construction resumed before October 20, 2022. The letter was widely circulated across Chinese social media and messaging platforms such as WeChat, Douyin, and Weibo as netizens shared their own frustrations with perceived mortgage-related injustices or commiserated with those who did. Within a month, sustained protests were observed in roughly one hundred Chinese cities, prompting the national government to introduce measures to prop up the low-volume real estate market and mitigate public outrage. Such measures include establishing local bailout funds to avoid insolvency and reducing the costs associated with taking out a mortgage loan.

== Background ==
Buoyed by the financial wave of the Chinese housing market during the 2010s, China Evergrande Group sought to further diversify by expanding into new economic sectors, such as the energy industry, electric vehicle production, and theme parks. To do so, Evergrande acquired debt from a variety of creditors, including the Chinese government, which ballooned to roughly $300 billion as of October 2022. This degree of leverage followed the “three red lines” rule imposed by the Chinese government in 2020, which dictated stricter borrowing thresholds and lower debt limits.

As Evergrande's liquidity reached precarious levels and its creditors became less inclined to take on further debt, Evergrande struggled to fund its property development concurrently with its ventures into alternative projects. Evergrande, already over-leveraged, was declared ‘weak’ in its liquidity position by several credit rating agencies from late 2021 to early 2022. This downturn morphed into a contagion, weakening other aspects of China's property market and slowing infrastructure growth; as of June 2022, total Chinese sales in real estate development have fallen 22% year-on-year

== Timeline ==
=== Pre-COVID-19 ===
One of the key reasons for the Chinese mortgage boycott is a result of the previous high demand for housing. The rise of the middle-class in China since the early 2000s precipitated a substantial investment in property, with many channelling savings into real estate as given the widely-held perception of Chinese property as one of the most stable forms of investment, with house prices averaging an annual 10% growth since 2006. As a result of this market stability and the shift towards neoliberal economics, individuals were able to borrow higher sums of money to purchase second or third homes with the intention of reselling for a higher price. The overall property price increase was fueled by rising land costs rather than construction costs (as a result of urbanisation); thus, much of the money invested by the population was allocated towards buying land rather than construction itself (Global Business Review, 2022). So, “when the time came to pay for construction, they would sell more unbuilt flats and use that money instead”. The faith that Chinese citizens had in the housing market and the purportedly ‘secure’ investment that real estate appeared allowed this process to flourish. This was a positive investment for the middle class as a result of both the increasing house prices and the lack of property tax. Property is estimated to make up between 17 and 29 percent of GDP in 2022, highlighting how reliant the Chinese economy is on the property sector. The pre-sale property model came into play as a result of the lack of housing in major cities, and, as Chinese citizens (prospective buyers) worried about rising house costs, they became willing to purchase property that was not yet constructed. Presently, 85% of Chinese households are purchased through pre-sale, an increase from 50 percent in 2005. Following 20 years of high-speed development, there has been a shift in the Chinese housing market. In the early 2000s China experienced an excessive population growth, implying an increasing number of buyers; however, as population growth slowed, the relative number of prospective buyers decreased. Accordingly, demand for new housing fell, and the funds allocated towards housing construction decreased, leaving many citizens paying mortgages on homes where building had halted.

=== COVID-19-Present day ===
Issues began to arise with China's housing market during the start of the COVID-19 pandemic in 2020. With a slowing economy largely caused by strict lockdowns, the property sector suffered a significant loss of investment, causing construction on new builds to halt. This decline is illustrated by statistics from the first six months of 2022, which show a 5.4% deterioration in growth of China's housing market

Additionally, it is common practice for developers within China to exploit the money obtained via pre-sale of unbuilt homes to invest into more land instead of allocating it to build homes that already have down-payments. Therefore, when investment decreased concurrently with the onset of COVID-19, issues regarding developers' lack of liquidity were more broadly exposed. In 2021, Evergrande, one of China's largest property developers, confirmed that it was unable to repay all of its $300 billion debt. This caused a significant public loss of confidence in developers across the nation, resulting in additional cuts in funding. Moreover, in the past three years, developers in China have undertaken work on over 6 billion square metres of property; however in August 2022, under half of the project had been completed.

If developers fail to deliver home by the contractual deadline, buyers are generally entitled to terminate their contract and recover their deposit. However, because construction has only been suspended, lenders have continued to demand payment from buyers of unfinished homes. Affected homebuyers began responding in July 2022 by organising collective defaults on mortgage payments until construction resumes. This boycott is notable for being largely organised on social media, a rare form of collective action under China's strict online censorship.

Shortly following the mass mobilisation, many Chinese social media accounts associated with the protests were deleted or banned from using the apps. Despite government censorship of the boycott, the number of mortgagees refusing to make payments continues to grow alongside the debt being accrued by developers . Currently, the mortgage boycott spans over 100 cities in China, affecting over 320 projects. Although the number of mortgages affected by the boycott only stands at 2%, it has raised concern across various levels of government, with schemes to provide relief under development. Investors in turn have baulked at the boycott, with large property firms such as China Vanke and Country Garden experiencing considerable declines in share price.

== Government response ==
The response by Chinese authorities to mortgage boycotts and the broader debt crisis facing property developers has primarily been concentrated on aiding developers and lenders to complete pre-sold projects on which construction has halted. There has also been consideration of a payment holiday for mortgage debtors, but any such action will require approval from officials in Beijing, and the priority remains delivering sold housing units.

Relief for developers and lenders has thus far been led at the local government level, with Zhengzhou city, the capital of Henan province and the city most affected by mortgages at risk of default, having created a property developer bailout fund. The fund has been established jointly by two local government backed firms, Henan Asset Management and Zhengzhou Real Estate Group. The governments of Chongqing and Ningbo have also set up working groups to address unfinished housing projects, but these have not led to any affirmative steps as of yet.

Action from the central government has so far been mostly constrained to announcements of potential initiatives and strategic shifts from regulators. The China Banking and Insurance Regulatory Commission (CBIRC), has in its statements confirmed that it is undertaking efforts to coordinate with the central bank and housing regulator to ensure the delivery of sold housing units. It has also instructed banks to meet developers’ financing requirements “where reasonable”. Further, the CBIRC is exploring tightening regulations surrounding the escrow accounts into which mortgage servicing payments are received to ensure that the funds are used for their intended purpose of completing housing projects rather than servicing debt. The China Securities Regulatory Commission (CSRC) has requested that banks disclose their degree of exposure to mortgage related assets at risk from the property crisis. The Housing Regulator has also distributed surveys among affected homebuyers to assess the scope of the situation. The only major initiative so far announced by the central government is the launch of a central real estate fund to help property developers resolve their debt crisis. The plan is for the central bank to raise Rmb80bb of funding initially, with other banks then raising the total to Rmb300bb ($44bb). This initiative is not aimed at completing projects like the one in Zhengzhou, but rather at assisting developers in servicing their debt, the primary cause of the construction delays.

== Impact ==
The mortgage boycott has further exacerbated the already extensive damage to the Chinese real estate sector, the largest economic sector in China. The threat of widespread mortgage default risks damage to a financial sector already burdened by real estate firms struggling to service their debt. The boycott's ramifications however have so far been contained to China. Lack of contamination was likely due to policies restricting foreign investment in the real estate market. At most, the greatest impact on foreign investors came in the form of stock dips in East Asian markets, notably in SARs of Hong Kong and Macau.

According to Reuters, real estate investment in China fell 12.3% between July 2021 and July 2022. In the same timeframe, new project numbers dropped by 45.4% and bank loans made out to developers dropped by 36.8%. Evergrande, the conglomerate responsible for most in-progress developments, invests in multiple industries outside of the housing market as well. Reports suggest that activity in these sectors has declined with the housing market.

In addition to developers, halted construction projects have also negatively impacted businesses along the housing supply chain which handle construction materials, plumbing, and landscaping. Without a revenue stream from homeowners and developers, many of these small businesses which build and sustain housing projects have been unable to or refused to pay bills.

Individual Chinese homeowners, who have largely used real estate as a primary avenue of investment in the past decade, no longer view the market as a haven for their earnings. As a result, the historic Chinese development model which is dependent on the “pay before build” system is under threat. Despite the growing boycott, the Chinese government stressed that the country's broader economy was well protected.

By July 2022, 235 property developments were affected by boycotts spanning across 24 of China's 31 provinces. Researchers fear that the boycott could affect even more homebuyers. The country's high home ownership rate (96% in 2020) combined with the amount of wealth which Chinese citizens tie in with real estate was cause for alarm. As a result, economic as well as social instability was a growing concern for Chinese officials.
