= Former residence of Jiang Zemin =

Former Residence of Jiang Zemin
- 江泽民故居
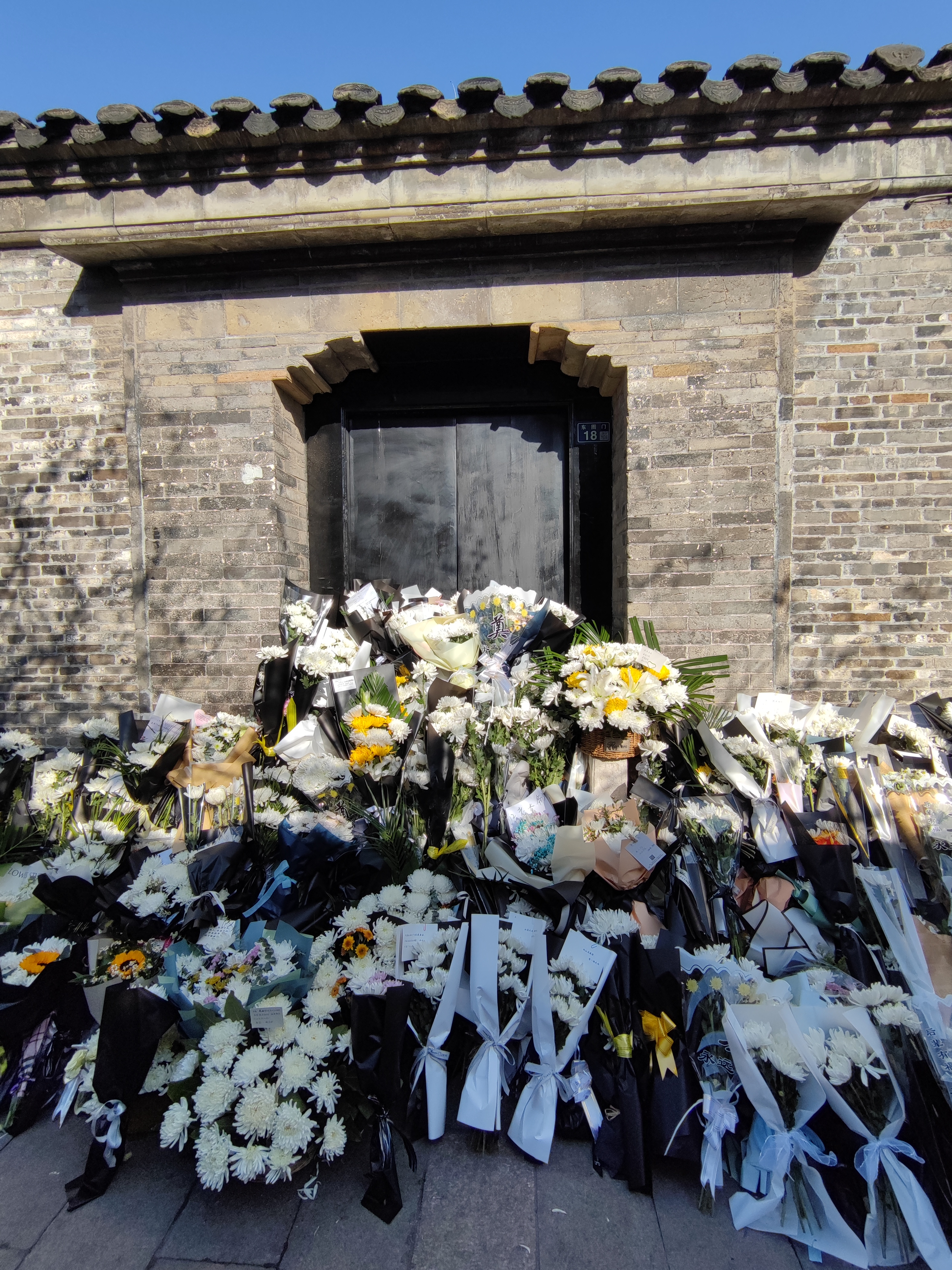
- Former Residence of Jiang Zemin

- Location within Jiangsu Location within China

General information
- Architectural style: Chinese architecture
- Location: Guangling District, Yangzhou City, China
- Coordinates: 32.235046°N 119.261925°E

The former residence of Jiang Zemin is located at No. 16 Dongquanmen, Dongguan Street Community, Guangling District, Yangzhou City, Jiangsu Province, China. It is the former residence of Jiang Zemin, the core leader of the third generation of leadership of the Chinese Communist Party (CCP) and the former CCP General Secretary. It was once listed as an immovable cultural relic (ungraded) under the name of "Jiang Shangqing’s former residence". On 4 July 2025, it was announced as the ninth batch of cultural relics protection units of Jiangsu Province.

== History ==
Built in the Qing dynasty, it was originally part of the Huyuan Garden owned by He Shi. In 1929, Jiang Shixi moved his family here. In 2004, the Jiangsu CCP Provincial Committee and the Yangzhou CCP Municipal Committee carried out renovations.

On the eve of the Qingming Festival in 2025, the former residence began to be open to the public. Visitors can make an appointment to visit from Tuesday to Sunday every week. They can enter with the original of the valid ID document (an appointment needs to be made one day in advance).

== Structure ==
The former residence is divided into two courtyards, east and west: the west courtyard is where Jiang Zemin lived with his family during his childhood and adolescence (1929 to 1940); the east courtyard is an exhibition hall, which includes three parts: "A Great and Glorious Life", "A Patriotic Intellectual Family" and "Yangzhou Will Always Be My Hometown".
