= Houses are for living, not for speculation =

Chinese Communist Party political slogan

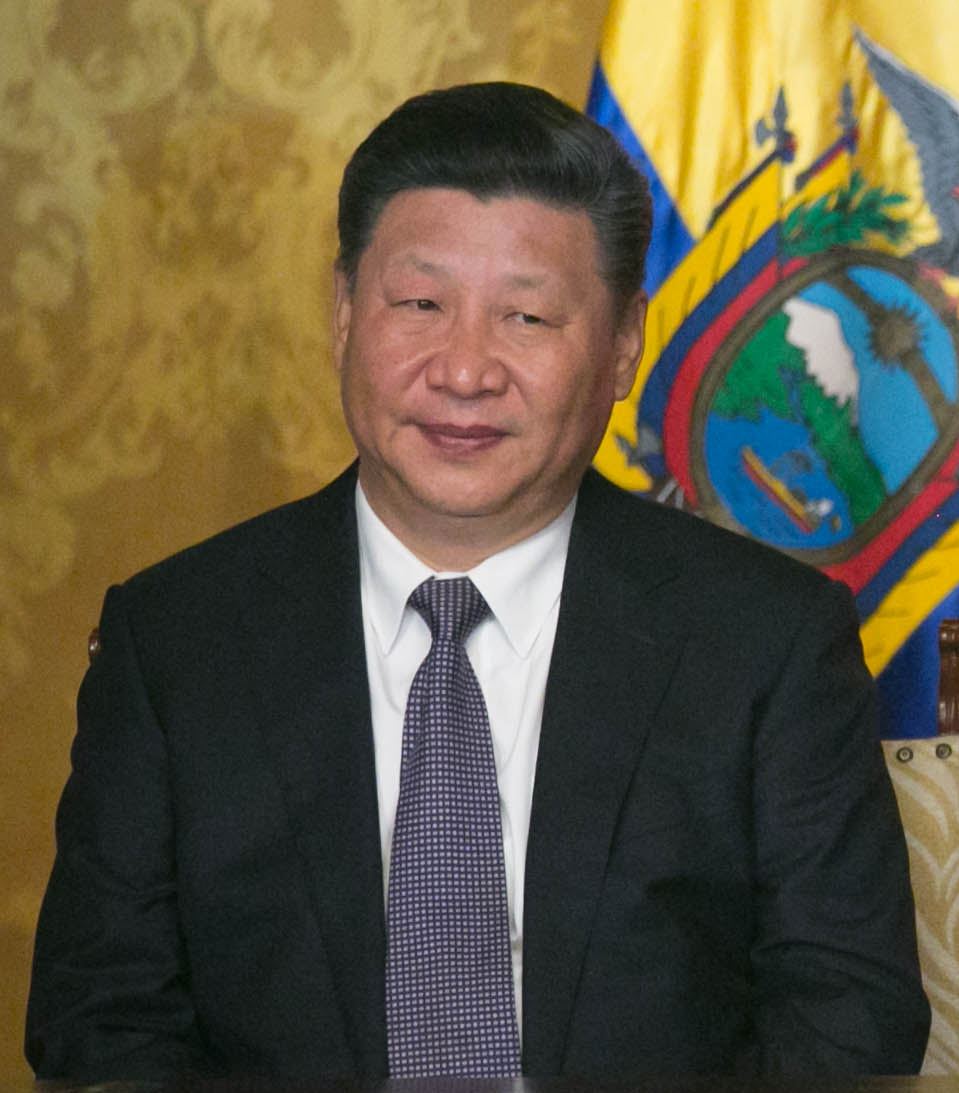
Xi Jinping in December 2016

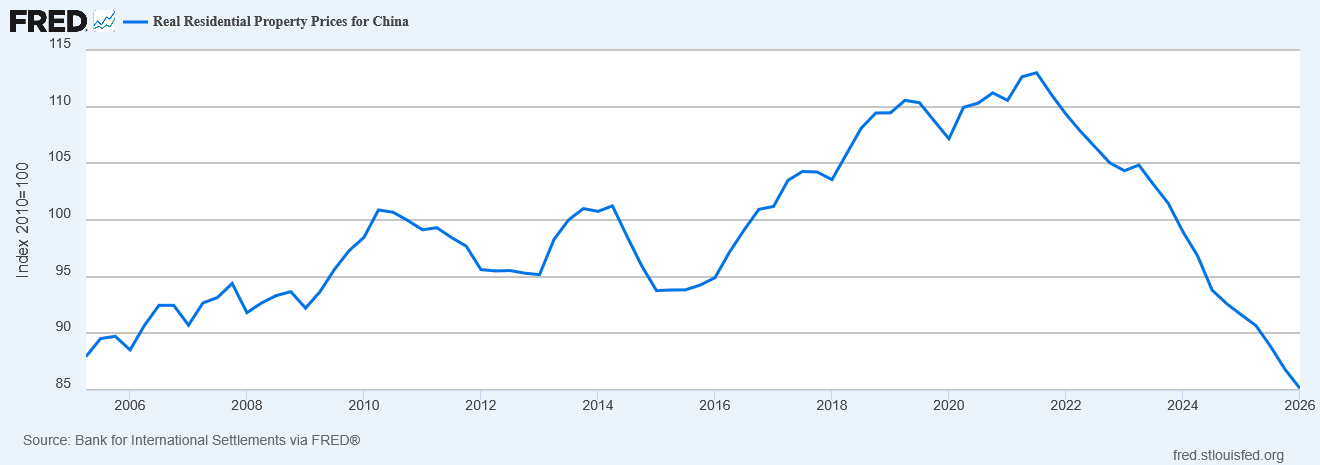
Plot of Real Residential Property Prices in China, from 2005 until 2026.

"Houses are for living, not for speculation" (Chinese: 房子是用来住的，不是用来炒的; pinyin: Fángzǐ shì yònglái zhùde, bùshì yònglái chǎode) is a Chinese political slogan to curb excessive speculation in the real estate market. The phrase was coined by Xi Jinping, the general secretary of the Chinese Communist Party (CCP), in December 2016, and later became the guiding policy of the Chinese government towards the real estate sector.

== History ==
Due to the rapid growth of the property market and lack of other financial options, real estate became a source of speculative investment after the start of the reform and opening up. In December 2016, at the annual meeting of the Central Economic Work Conference, Xi gave a speech, where he introduced the concept "houses are for living, not for speculation". He repeated the slogan during the opening speech of the 19th National Congress of the Chinese Communist Party in October 2017. He continued by saying "China will accelerate establishing a system with supply from multiple parties, affordability from different channels, and make rental housing as important as home purchasing".

The slogan also appeared in government work reports given by Premier Li Keqiang in 2018, 2020 and 2021, though the 2019 work report omitted it. The phrase was also used in Premier Li Qiang's 2023 government work report, though the 2024 report did not include the phrase. The Chinese government has begun to take strong measures to decrease real estate-related credit expansion, control house price increases and financial risks, curb investment in real estate, and reduce local reliance on land finance. In 2020, the government established the three red lines guidelines to curb debt in the property sector.

== See also ==
- Chinese property bubble (2005–2011)
- Chinese property sector crisis (2020–present)
