= Seventh plenary session of the 18th Central Committee of the Chinese Communist Party =

Event held in Beijing

Seventh plenary session of the 18th Central Committee of the Chinese Communist Party 中国共产党第十八届中央委员会第七次全体会议
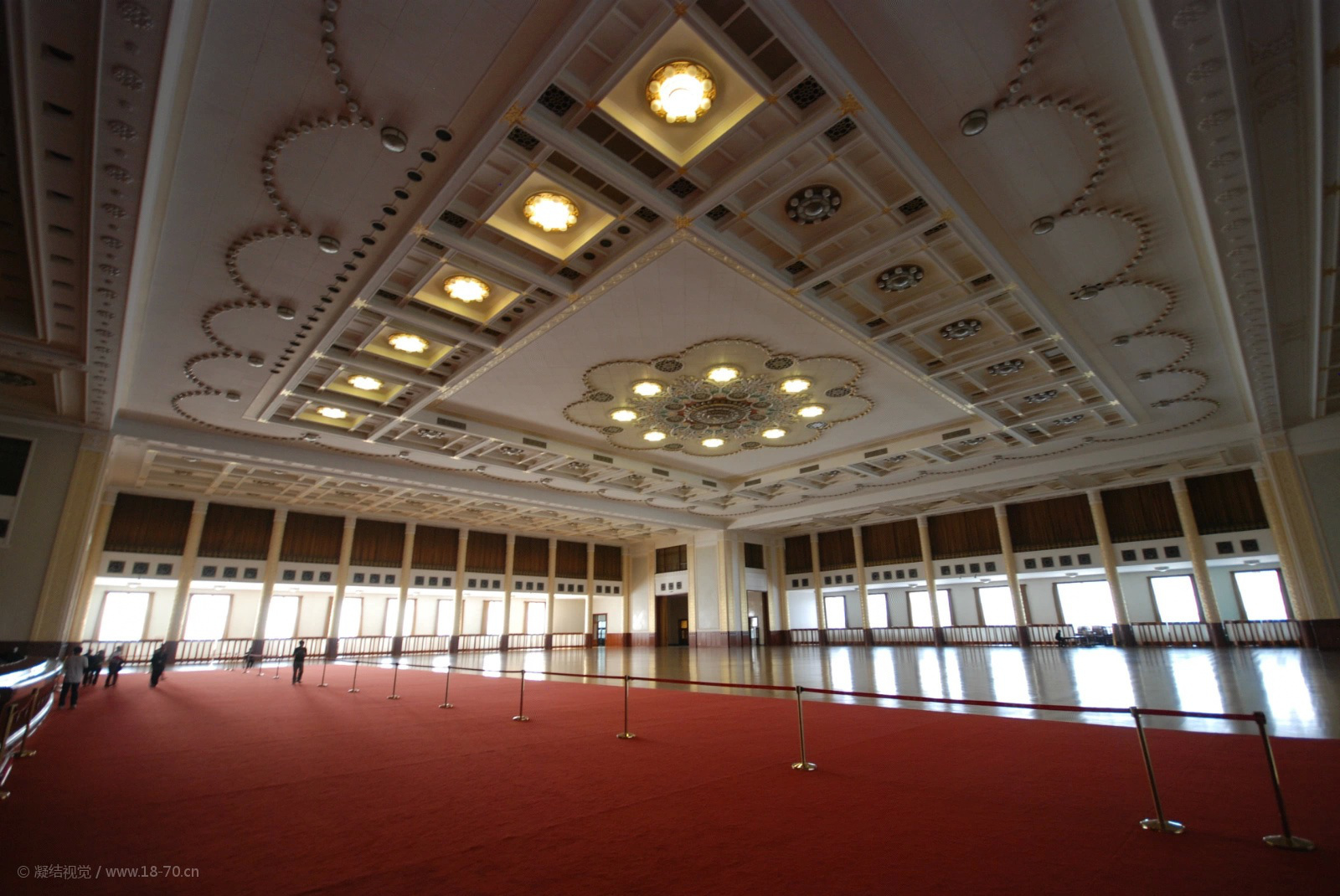
- Panoramic view of the Banquet Hall in the Great Hall of the People
- Date: October 11–14, 2017
- Locations: Banquet Hall, Great Hall of the People, Beijing, China
- Previous event: Sixth plenary session of the 18th Central Committee
- Next event: First plenary session of the 19th Central Committee
- Participants: 191 Central Committee members 141 Central Committee alternate members
- General Secretary: Xi Jinping

Seventh plenary session of the 18th Central Committee of the Chinese Communist Party
- Simplified Chinese: 中国共产党第十八届中央委员会第七次全体会议
- Traditional Chinese: 中國共產黨第十八屆中央委員會第七次全體會議
Transcriptions
Standard Mandarin
- Hanyu Pinyin: Zhōngguó Gòngchǎndǎng Dìshíbā Jiè Zhōngyāng Wěiyuánhuì Dìqīcì Quántǐ Huìyì

Abbreviation
- Simplified Chinese: 中共十八届七中全会
- Traditional Chinese: 中共十八屆七中全會
Transcriptions
Standard Mandarin
- Hanyu Pinyin: Zhōnggòng Shíbājiè Qīzhōng Quánhuì

The seventh plenary session of the 18th Central Committee of the Chinese Communist Party was convened from October 11 to 14, 2017.

== Meeting ==
Based on the proposal of the Politburo, the plenary session decided that the 19th National Congress of the Chinese Communist Party would be held in Beijing on October 18, 2017.

The plenary session was chaired by the Politburo, and Xi Jinping, General Secretary of the CCP Central Committee, delivered an important speech. The Seventh Plenary Session of the 18th CCP Central Committee is the last plenary session of the 18th CCP Central Committee. The 19th CCP National Congress will be held immediately afterwards to elect the 19th CCP Central Committee.

The plenary session listened to the work report made by Xi Jinping on behalf of the 18th CCP Central Committee Political Bureau, reviewed and approved the work reports made by the 18th CCP Central Committee and the 18th CCP Central Commission for Discipline Inspection to the 19th CCP National Congress, reviewed and approved the Constitution of the Chinese Communist Party (Amendment), and decided to submit these three documents to the 19th CCP National Congress for review and deliberation. The plenary session highly praised the work of the current CCP Central Committee during its five-year term, and for the first time in the communiqué, it highly praised the work of the current CCP Central Commission for Discipline Inspection in a large section, and once again emphasized Xi Jinping's core position.

In accordance with the provisions of the Party Constitution, the plenary session decided to appoint Cui Bo, Shu Xiaoqin, Ma Shunqing, Wang Jianjun, Li Qiang, Chen Wu, Chen Mingming, Zhao Lixiong, Zhao Shucong, Duan Chunhua and Luosang Jiangcun, alternate members of the 18th CCP Central Committee, as members of the Central Committee. It also listened to the investigation reports of the Central Commission for Discipline Inspection and the Central Military Commission on the serious violations of discipline by 15 people including Sun Zhengcai and Wang Jianping, and confirmed the previous decision of the Politburo to expel Sun Zhengcai, Huang Xingguo, Sun Huaishan, Wu Aiying, Su Shulin, Wang Sanyun, Xiang Junbo, Wang Jianping, Tian Xiusi, Li Yunfeng, Yang Chongyong and Mo Jiancheng from the Party, to give Li Liguo and Yang Huanning a two-year probationary period, and to dismiss Zhang Xiwu from his position within the Party.

This plenary session was the one in which the CCP had the most replacements and punishments for Central Committee members in its history; it saw the greatest number of expulsions at a single plenum post-Cultural Revolution party history. In addition, Liu Xuepu, Zhu Yanfeng, Zheng Qunliang, and Zhao Jin, who were ranked relatively high among the alternate members of the Central Committee, were "skipped" and not replaced as Central Committee members for unknown reasons.
