= Leadership core =

Leader recognized as central in the Chinese Communist Party

In modern Chinese politics, a leadership core or core leader (Chinese: 领导核心; pinyin: lǐngdǎo héxīn) refers to a person who is recognized as central to the leadership of the Chinese Communist Party (CCP). Four individuals so far have been given this designation: Mao Zedong, Deng Xiaoping, Jiang Zemin, and Xi Jinping. The leader of the fourth generation, Hu Jintao, has never been referred to as core throughout his term as CCP general secretary. The designation is not a formal title and does not hold legal weight, but its use in official party documentation gives its holder a precisely defined place in theory on their relative standing to the rest of the CCP leadership. Although all core leaders have also been paramount leaders, not all paramount leaders are or have been designated 'leadership core'.

== History ==
From the pivotal Zunyi Conference forward, Mao Zedong was the undisputed leader of the CCP, though he did not formally become CCP chairman until 1943. However, much of Mao's authority was informal, earned after years of building clout through the civil war and intra-party struggles. After Mao died in 1976, his successor as party chairman, Hua Guofeng, was unable to build a strong coalition of support in spite of having a wide range of official titles. Deng Xiaoping emerged as the pre-eminent leader of China in 1978, and was indisputably the highest authority in the country throughout the 1980s even though he held only one formal government post, that of chairman of the Central Military Commission. Deng said "for the second generation of leaders, I can be considered the core, but the group is still a collective".

Following the 1989 Tiananmen Square protests and massacre, Zhao Ziyang, the party's General Secretary and widely recognized as Deng's successor at the time, was sidelined due to his sympathy to student protesters. In his place, party elders brought in then Shanghai party secretary Jiang Zemin to take over the position of general secretary. However, Jiang, who had spent much of his career in Shanghai, was a compromise candidate who had no prior experience in the party's central organization. Consolidating his power and raising his stature in the party required the backing of Deng and other party elders, but also a recognition from other members of the party leadership that Jiang was now the dominant leadership figure.

To strengthen Jiang's position in spite of his relatively thin political resume, Deng advanced the idea of the "leadership core", referencing Mao as the core of the party during the revolution in the early years of the People's Republic, and declaring himself the core of the party since the beginning of economic reforms. The term "core", which invoked a concentric, non-hierarchical image, was a clever political innovation that avoided designating any individual as "supreme" and "above the rest". It implicitly recognized the political ills of the personality cult during the Mao era while also allowing for the embodiment of unity around a single leadership figure.

In June 1989, shortly following the military's advance on Beijing to quell the protests, Deng said to other party leaders, "every leadership collective must have a core; a leading collective without a core is unreliable." Ostensibly, Deng was making a reference to the diffusion of power after the death of Mao. In response, Deng declared, Jiang Zemin would become the core of the "third generation" of Communist Party leaders. Jiang was referred to as a "core" in official documentation for the first time on November 9, 1989, at the closing of the Fifth Plenum of the 13th Central Committee. Deng called for the party leaders to "closely rally around the party center with Jiang Zemin as its core." The phrase was then oft-repeated as a familiar slogan in official party documentation thereafter, until the succession of Hu Jintao as party leader in 2002. Deng stated:

The core of our first generation of collective leadership was Chairman Mao. Because of that core, the “cultural revolution” did not bring the Communist Party down. Actually, I am the core of the second generation. Because of this core, even though we changed two of our leaders, the Party’s exercise of leadership was not affected but always remained stable. The third generation of collective leadership must have a core too; all you comrades present here should be keenly aware of that necessity and act accordingly. You should make an effort to maintain the core — Comrade Jiang Zemin, as you have agreed. From the very first day it starts to work, the new Standing Committee should make a point of establishing and maintaining this collective leadership and its core.

Upon Hu's taking on the titles of the party and the state, Jiang refused to relinquish the chairmanship of the Central Military Commission until 2005, in a move that paralleled Deng holding the title in the 1980s, when the party was nominally run by other people. However, Jiang lacked Deng's clout, and was criticized by some members of the party for overstaying his term and meddling in the affairs of his successor. Jiang had stacked the Politburo Standing Committee, which made decisions based on consensus, with his own allies, constraining Hu's authority. Hu was therefore largely seen as a "first-among-equals" figure with his Standing Committee colleagues. Not only could he not rule by fiat, but that he never earned recognition as "core" was also a signal that he possibly even lacked the power of arbitration that was normally accorded to a "core" figure. In this leadership collective, Hu was never referred to explicitly as the new "core" of the party. Instead, the party documents used the phrase, "united around the party center with Comrade Hu Jintao as General Secretary" (Chinese: 以胡锦涛同志为总书记的党中央).

Xi Jinping succeeded Hu as CCP general secretary in 2012. He embarked on a series of bold programs to eliminate corruption and reform the economy. By 2016, his pre-eminent status became widely understood and many provincial party chiefs began declaring fealty to him and again invoking the term "leadership core". Xi's official status as the "core" was announced at a gathering of the sixth plenary session of the 18th Central Committee that year.
