= Real estate in China =

Overview of real estate in the People's Republic of China

Real estate in the People's Republic of China is developed and managed by public, private, and state-owned red chip enterprises.

In the years leading up to the 2008 financial crisis, the real estate sector in the People's Republic of China (PRC) was growing so rapidly that the government implemented a series of policies—including raising the required down payment for some property purchases, and five 2007 interest rate increases—due to concerns of overheating. But after the crisis hit, these policies were quickly eliminated, and in some cases tightened. Beijing also launched a massive stimulus package to boost growth, and much of the stimulus eventually flowed into the property market and drove prices up, resulting in investors increasingly looking abroad. As of 2015, the market was experiencing low growth and the central government had eased prior measures to tighten interest rates, increase deposits and impose restrictions. By early 2016, the Chinese government introduced a series of measures to increase property purchases, including lower taxes on home sales, limiting land sales for new development projects, and the third in a series of mortgage down payment reductions. In the 2020s, a slowdown in the sector led to the real estate sector to be increasingly dominated by state-owned enterprises.

== Background ==
With the exception of rural land (which is owned collectively by rural villagers) land in China is state-owned. The state leases the right to use land for periods of time which vary based on use: industrial land can be leased for 30 years, commercial land for 40 years, and residential land for 70 years. Traditionally, the right to use industrial land was sold at a discount while commercial and residential real estate prices were determined by the market.

Rural land is collectively owned and leased to individual households. Rural land is broadly categorized as either farmland, homestead, or other construction land.

== History ==
=== Early history (1840s–1949) ===
The origins of modern real estate enterprises in China can be traced back to the mid-19th century. After the First Opium War in 1840, foreign powers established concessions in cities such as Shanghai, Guangzhou, and Tianjin. The influx of large populations into these areas led to increased housing demand, prompting both Chinese and foreign merchants to engage in real estate development, with land values and property prices rising significantly during this period. By the 1920s, independent real estate companies had gradually replaced landlord-run rental agencies and offices, becoming the dominant force in China's real estate sector. The industry experienced rapid growth until the full-scale outbreak of the Second Sino-Japanese War in 1937. After the war ended in 1945, the real estate market briefly recovered as wartime migrants returned home. However, with the eruption of the second phase of the Chinese Civil War in 1946, the industry began to decline. Prior to the establishment of the People's Republic of China in 1949, foreign-owned properties in China totaled over 10 million square meters, concentrated in major cities such as Shanghai, Nanjing, and Beiping (now Beijing), and were held by entities from 34 countries including the United Kingdom and the United States.

=== Public ownership and welfare housing (1949–1978) ===
From the founding of the People's Republic of China in 1949 until 1978, a fully public ownership economic system was implemented. Urban land was entirely nationalized, and all properties owned by Nationalist government and its military and political officials were confiscated. Foreign-owned real estate was also uniformly brought under state ownership. Remaining properties were turned into state assets through means such as takeover, requisition, debt repayment, or purchase. All public properties were managed uniformly by government departments. Initially, a small number of privately owned properties were allowed to operate legally, but these were gradually expropriated during the Socialist Transformation and the 1958 state buyout—a process that scholars have described as eliminating the real estate industry as an independent economic sector.

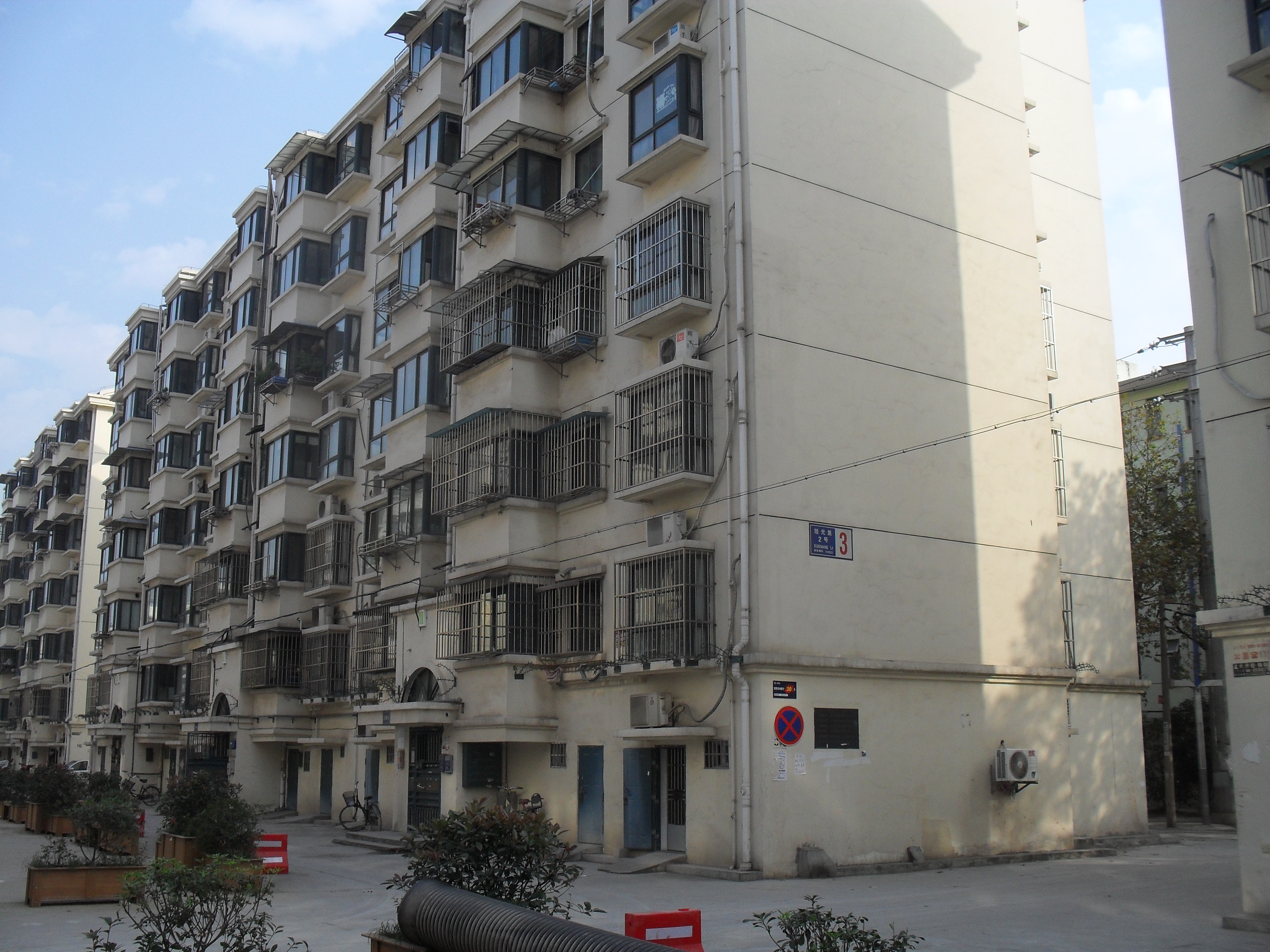
Xuguangli in Nanjing, a work unit-assigned building constructed as communal housing during the planned economy era.

Before the 1978 Reform and Opening-Up, the PRC operated under a centrally planned economy. Housing was not treated as a commodity but as a form of welfare. Productive real estate, such as factory buildings and infrastructure, was financed and allocated by the state without compensation, while non-productive housing, including employee residences, was also planned, constructed, and distributed by government agencies and state-owned work units under a unified administrative system. Scholars have noted that housing was financed by government capital expenditure and allocated by work units, with user-residents paying only nominal rents. This model placed long-term fiscal pressure on state institutions responsible for maintenance and service provision. In the late 1970s, official surveys indicated that average urban living space per person was below 4 square meters, reflecting a severe housing shortage. Many residents lived in overcrowded communal apartments, often sharing kitchens and bathrooms with multiple households.

=== Early housing reform and market experiments (1979–1991) ===
Housing was the first social policy-related sector to be marketized. The government began this process by selling private housing, encouraging subsidized ownership, and then addressed rent reform. Initial policies of selling private housing and subsidized ownership were not successful (there was a lack of public interest for purchasing private housing; employers were unhappy with the high subsidies required of them). Rent reform was more effective, ultimately combining cash subsidies or vouchers (which gradually decreased over time) with permitting rent to be raised.

In an effort to ease the transition to a marketized housing sector, various local governments implemented the New Policies for Newly Built Homes. These policies required all newly-built homes to be sold on the market (as opposed to being purchased by employers) and precluded new school or university graduates from obtaining public housing, while older employees were able to continue with public housing. These policies thus sought to focus on those who could afford paying higher rents and had not yet taken publicly provided housing as a given.

In October 1979, China's first commercial housing project, Donghu New Village in Guangzhou, was approved for construction. In January 1980, the Shenzhen Special Economic Zone saw the signing of the country's first cooperative housing construction contract, as well as the establishment of the first real estate enterprise in mainland China — the Shenzhen Special Economic Zone Real Estate Company.

In June 1980, the Central Committee of the Chinese Communist Party and the State Council officially approved the implementation of housing commodification by endorsing the Outline Report of the National Conference on Capital Construction. The policy permitted private individuals to build, purchase, and own residential properties. By October of the same year, 128 cities and several counties and towns across the country had launched pilot programs for private housing construction and sales.

On April 12, 1988, the First Session of 7th National People's Congress adopted a constitutional amendment, revising Article 10, Paragraph 4 of the Constitution. The original provision — “No organization or individual may usurp, buy, sell, lease or otherwise illegally transfer land” — was amended to: “No organization or individual may usurp, buy, sell or otherwise illegally transfer land. The right to the use of land may be transferred in accordance with the provisions of the law. The 1988 constitutional amendment has been interpreted by scholars as a formal recognition of the shift toward marketization in China’s land use system.

In May 1990, the State Council promulgated the Interim Regulations of the People's Republic of China Concerning the Assignment and Transfer of the Right to the Use of the State-Owned Land in the Urban Areas, officially launching the nationwide implementation of the paid land-use rights transfer system.

=== Housing commercialization and privatization (1992–2003) ===
Following Deng Xiaoping's southern tour market reforms accelerated across various sectors, including housing. In 1994, the State Council issued the “Decision on Deepening the Urban Housing Reform,” which formally laid out the goal of establishing a housing market based on private ownership and monetary compensation, replacing the decades-old welfare allocation system.

In 1998, the State Council issued a directive formally ending the practice of in-kind housing allocation by work units. From that point onward, housing was no longer provided by work units, and urban residents were encouraged to purchase housing through the commercial market. Millions of state-owned housing units were sold to employees at subsidized prices, significantly increasing the proportion of privately owned housing in urban areas. Scholars have interpreted this shift as a critical step in the commodification and privatization of urban housing in China. Concurrently, the reform of housing finance played a key supporting role. The Chinese government expanded access to mortgage lending, encouraged the growth of commercial banks, and promoted the development of a secondary housing market. Real estate enterprises began to play a more prominent role in the urban economy, while local governments increasingly relied on land conveyance fees as a significant source of revenue—a trend that would intensify in later years.

The real estate market began to develop in earnest after 1998.

As of 2010, China's real estate market is the largest in the world. According to Bloomberg Economics estimates, the sector contributed to about 19% of China's GDP in 2024, down from a peak of 24% in 2018. According to the National Bureau of Statistics, the share of real estate and related industries as a share of China's GDP dropped from 14.45% in 2021 to 12.94% in 2024, while the share of real estate alone dropped from 7.7% to 6.27%.

As of 2023, real property accounts for 60% of Chinese household assets.

=== Property bubble, 2005–2011 ===
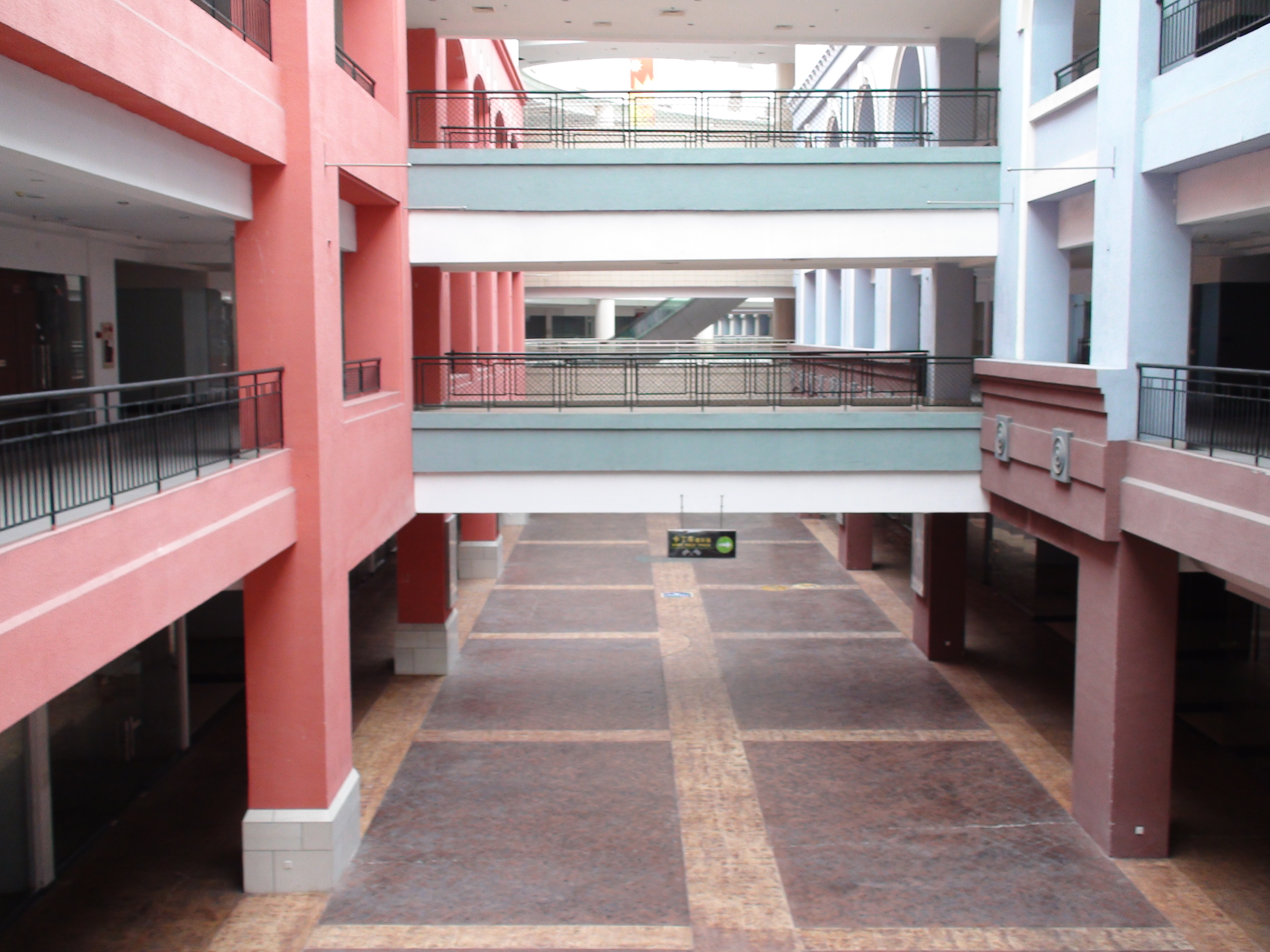
An empty corridor in the mostly vacant New South China Mall, 2010

The Chinese property bubble was a real estate bubble in residential and/or commercial real estate in China. The phenomenon has seen average housing prices in the country triple from 2005 to 2009, possibly driven by both government policies and Chinese cultural attitudes.

- Tianjin High price-to-income and price-to-rent ratios for property and the high number of unoccupied residential and commercial units have been held up as evidence of a bubble. Critics of the bubble theory point to China's relatively conservative mortgage lending standards and trends of increasing urbanization and rising incomes as proof that property prices can remain supported.

The growth of the housing bubble ended in late 2011 when housing prices began to fall, following policies responding to complaints that members of the middle-class were unable to afford homes in large cities. The deflation of the property bubble is seen as one of the primary causes for China's declining economic growth in 2012.

2011 estimates by property analysts state that there are some 64 million empty properties and apartments in China and that housing development in China is massively oversupplied and overvalued, and is a bubble waiting to burst with serious consequences in the future. The BBC cites Ordos in Inner Mongolia as the largest ghost town in China, full of empty shopping malls and apartment complexes. A large, and largely uninhabited, urban real estate development has been constructed 25 km from Dongsheng District in the Kangbashi New Area. Intended to house a million people, it remains largely uninhabited. Intended to have 300,000 residents by 2010, government figures stated it had 28,000. In Beijing residential rent prices rose 32% between 2001 and 2003; the overall inflation rate in China was 16% over the same period. To avoid sinking into the economic downturn, in 2008, the Chinese government immediately altered China's monetary policy from a conservative stance to a progressive attitude by means of suddenly increasing the money supply and largely relaxing credit conditions. Under such circumstances, the main concern is whether this expansionary monetary policy has acted to simulate the property bubble.

In 2011, China's central government encouraged local governments to limit the purchases of new apartments.

=== Crisis after 2020 ===
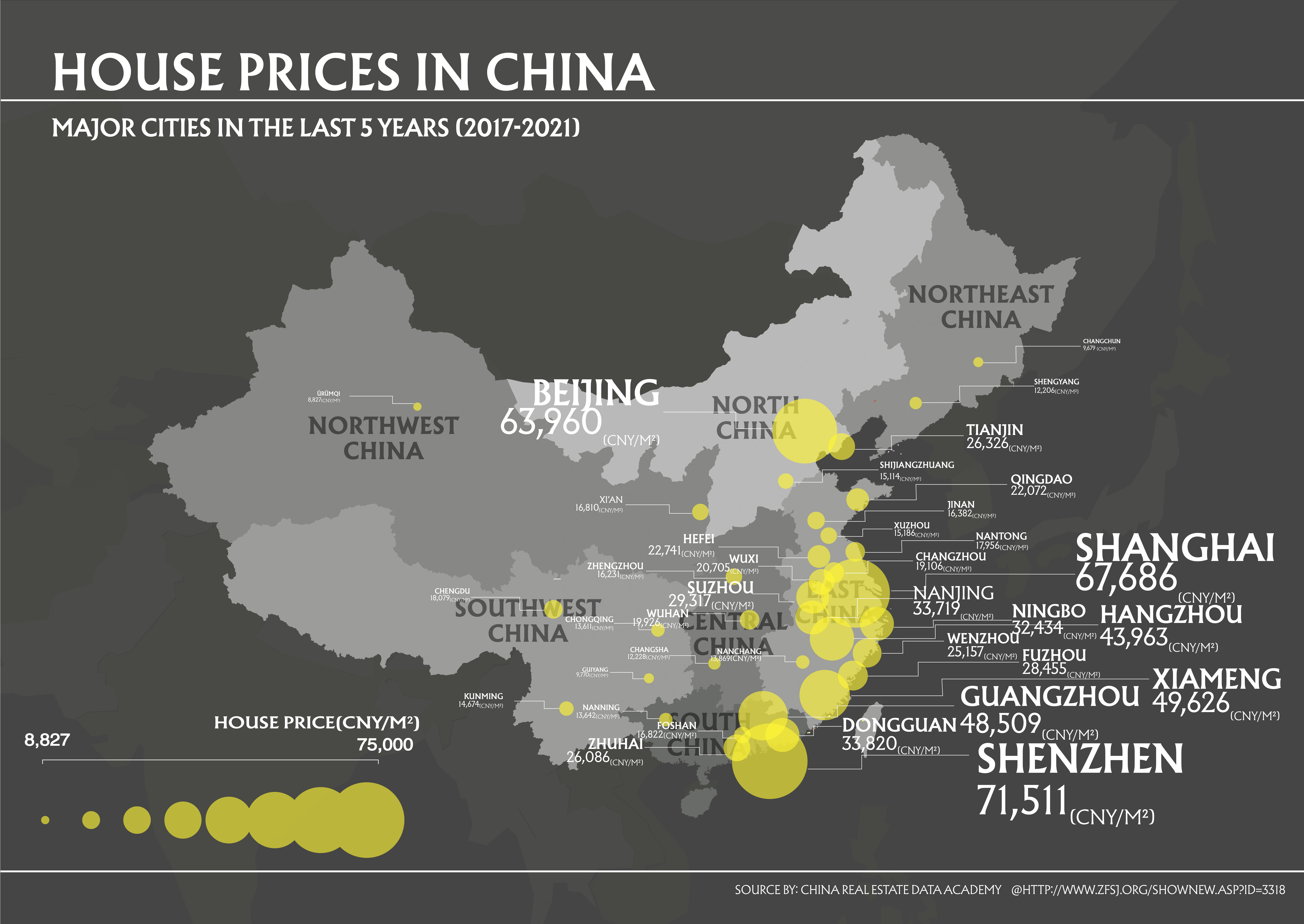

In an effort to curb the highly leveraged real estate sector and reduce housing prices for citizens, the Chinese government adopted a Three red lines rule in 2020 to regulate the debt taken on by developers and limit their borrowing based on the following ratios: debt to cash, debt to equity, and debt to total assets. The adoption of stricter regulations triggered turmoil in the Chinese real estate market and led to bond defaults by developers and in some cases bankruptcy filings. Troubled developers include Evergrande, Shimao Group, Country Garden and others. As of Sep. 2023 34 of the top 50 developers have defaulted on their debt. Although the impact to the overall economy has been claimed to be limited, shareholders of the affected property companies have been wiped out, bondholders have been nearly wiped out, loans to these companies through wealth management products are similarly in trouble, many vendors, subcontractors and workers have not been paid for their services, while many Chinese who have purchased properties from these companies are increasingly at risk of not receiving anything. According to economists' estimates, house prices in China decreased by around 30% from 2021 to 2026. With up to 70% of Chinese wealth invested into real estate, a drop in real estate prices will make Chinese poorer and the resulting negative wealth effect will cause a contraction in consumption. In addition land sales to developers had accounted for about 40% of income for Chinese local governments but reduced building activity by developers has caused a drop in that income. While official numbers show a small decline in that revenue the size of the drop is contested due to local governments propping up the numbers by buying up their own land, and much evident severe funding issues at many of the local governments.

== Market dynamics ==
=== Structural trends ===
According to data from the National Bureau of Statistics of China, the number of real estate development enterprises in the PRC rose from 89,859 in 2012 to a peak of 105,434 in 2021, before declining to 100,111 by 2023.1 Throughout this period, over 95% of enterprises were domestically funded, demonstrating the overwhelming presence of local capital in the industry. Enterprises funded by investors from Hong Kong, Macao, and Taiwan declined from 3,451 in 2012 to 2,448 in 2023, while foreign-funded enterprises fell from 1,713 to 734, indicating a long-term reduction in external participation.

Employment in China's real estate sector remained relatively high until 2020, when it peaked at approximately 29.0 million people. However, employment levels declined significantly thereafter, falling to around 20.0 million by 2023. This reduction in workforce size corresponds with a broader cooling trend in the real estate market during the early 2020s.

Completed investment in the real estate sector rose from 7.18 trillion yuan in 2012 to 13.76 trillion yuan in 2021, before declining to 11.21 trillion yuan in 2023. The construction area under development showed a similar trajectory, expanding from 573 million square meters in 2012 to 975 million square meters in 2021, then dropping to 840 million square meters by 2023.

Scholars have observed that the real estate sector's shift from rapid expansion to consolidation in the early 2020s was influenced by regulatory reforms, such as the "three red lines" policy, tighter financing conditions, and declining housing demand. The slowdown led to the real estate sector to be increasingly dominated by state-owned enterprises, in contrast to the previous domination by private companies. By 2024, state-owned enterprises have been winning majority of residential land auctions in cities like Beijing.

=== International investment ===
Chinese consumers have become one of the biggest groups of investors in cross-border property. In the US, Chinese buyers invested $28.6 billion into the residential real estate in 2015, more than any other country. In Australia, Chinese buyers were approved for AU$32 billion of commercial and residential real estate investment in 2015–16, the most of any country. Sue Jong, Chief Operating Officer of Juwai.com, a subsidiary of Juwai IQI said most Chinese buyers are "the average Chinese mom and pop looking to invest overseas. The large portion is the middle to upper middle class, that's interested in a good stable investment and may be thinking about emigrating or sending their kids to school there."

=== Welfare housing system, parallel dynamics, corruption ===
As of 2010, China has officially ordered an end to its welfare housing system; however, according to China Youth Daily, a parallel housing market continues to exist. Government agencies continue to pay less than 20% of market value for real estate, and many officials purportedly misappropriate renovation and housing reform funds for personal gain.

=== Government intervention ===
Since the mid-2010s, the Chinese government has introduced a series of regulatory measures aimed at stabilizing the real estate market and discouraging speculative investment. In 2016, the Chinese Communist Party and government adopted the principle that "houses are for living, not for speculation", a slogan first emphasized by General Secretary of the Chinese Communist Party Xi Jinping and later incorporated into national housing policy.

In August 2020, the Ministry of Housing and Urban-Rural Development introduced the "three red lines" policy, setting thresholds on debt ratios for property developers based on liabilities-to-assets, net gearing, and cash-to-short-term debt ratios. Following its implementation, several major developers, including China Evergrande Group, faced liquidity challenges. The International Monetary Fund (IMF) noted growing stress in China's property sector, observing that financial strains at Evergrande had begun to spill over to other developers.

In response to the slowdown in the housing market that followed, the Chinese government began to implement supportive measures in 2022 and 2023. These included reductions in mortgage interest rates, lower down payment requirements, and expanded funding for affordable housing projects. Local governments were also granted greater flexibility to adapt housing policies according to regional conditions.

Despite these interventions, challenges persisted into 2024, prompting the Chinese government to further expand credit support. In early 2024, the Chinese government announced plans to provide approximately 4 trillion yuan (about US$560 billion) in financing for approved housing developments, as part of broader efforts to stabilize the sector and bolster economic activity.

== See also ==
- Housing in China
- Nail house
- Underoccupied developments in China
- 2020–2022 Chinese property sector crisis
