= 1988 amendment to the Constitution of China =

Amendment to the Constitution of the People's Republic of China

National People's Congress
- Territorial extent: China
- Passed by: National People's Congress
- Passed: 12 April 1988
- Effective: 12 April 1988

Codification
- Acts amended: Constitution of the People's Republic of China
- Introduced by: Standing Committee of the National People's Congress
- Voting summary: 2,821 voted for; 22 voted against; 16 abstained
- Status: In force

The Amendment to the Constitution of the People's Republic of China was proposed by the 13th Central Committee of the Chinese Communist Party and adopted at the first session of the 7th National People's Congress on 12 April 1988.

The amendments included amending Articles 10 and 11 of the Constitution to allow the emergence of private economy and the transfer of land use rights.

== History ==
On February 28, the CCP Central Committee submitted to the Standing Committee of the National People's Congress the "Proposal of the Central Committee of the Chinese Communist Party on Amending Certain Articles of the Constitution of the People's Republic of China". On March 12, the twenty fifth session of the Standing Committee of the 6th National People's Congress passed the "Draft Constitutional Amendment" based on the central government's constitutional amendment proposal, and decided to submit it to the first session of the 7th National People's Congress for deliberation. On April 12, the first session of the 7th National People's Congress passed the Constitutional Amendment with 2,821 votes in favor, 22 votes against, and 16 abstentions.

== Amendments ==
The amendments included amending Articles 10 and 11 of the Constitution to allow the emergence of private economy and the transfer of land use rights.

The revisions legalized the separation of land use rights from land ownership. This was the constitutional foundation for the 1990 Regulation of Urban Land Use Rights, which allowed land use rights to be bought and sold in the real estate market without changing the underlying title of public land.
