= Code of Conduct for Intraparty Political Life Under New Circumstances =

Chinese Communist Party document

- Simplified Chinese: 关于新形势下党内政治生活的若干准则
- Traditional Chinese: 關於新局勢下黨內政治生活的若干準則
Transcriptions
Standard Mandarin
- Hanyu Pinyin: Guānyú Xīn Xíngshì Xià Dǎngnèi Zhèngzhì Shēnghuó de Ruògān Zhǔnzé

The Code of Conduct for Intraparty Political Life Under New Circumstances is a document issued at the sixth plenary session of the 18th Central Committee of the Chinese Communist Party held in October 2016. The core purpose of the Code is to strengthen and regulate the political life within the Chinese Communist Party and promote "comprehensive and strict governance of the Party".

The communique following the sixth plenary session of the 18th CCP Central Committee pointed out that "the CCP Central Committee with Comrade Xi Jinping as its core" is firmly advancing "comprehensive and strict governance of the Party". The "comprehensive and strict governance of the Party" is one of the main contents of the Four Comprehensives proposed by Xi Jinping, General Secretary of the CCP Central Committee, in 2014. After becoming General Secretary of the CCP Central Committee in 2012, Xi Jinping has repeatedly mentioned "strict governance of the Party" and "the Party must manage the Party" in public. This new Code is inherited from the Code of Conduct for Intraparty Political Life formulated in 1980.

== Content ==
The requirements for the political life within the CCP are as follows:

1. Firmly uphold ideals and beliefs;
2. Adhere to the Party's basic line;
3. Resolutely uphold the authority of the Party Central Committee;
4. Strictly enforce the Party's political discipline;
5. Maintaining close ties between the Party and the people;
6. Adhere to the principle of democratic centralism;
7. Promote intra-party democracy and safeguard the rights of party members;
8. Adhere to the correct orientation in selecting and appointing personnel;
9. Strictly enforce the Party's organizational life system;
10. Conduct criticism and self-criticism;
11. Strengthen the checks and balances and oversight of the exercise of power;
12. Maintain a clean and honest political character.
