= Supply-side structural reform =

Chinese economic policy aimed to reduce overcapacity

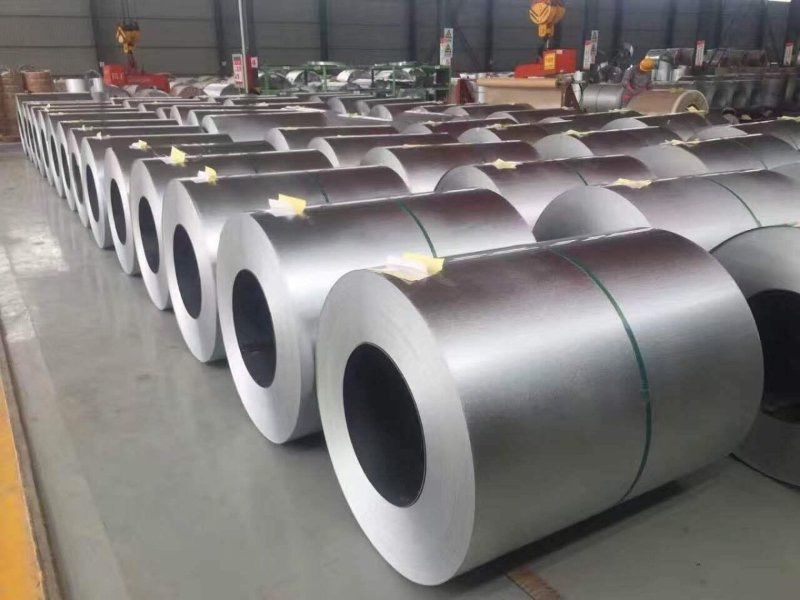
Chinese production of steel has led to overcapacity problems

The supply-side structural reform (Chinese: 供给侧结构性改革; pinyin: Gōngjǐcè Jiégòu Xìng Gǎigé) is a Chinese economic policy introduced in November 2015 by General Secretary of the Chinese Communist Party Xi Jinping at the 11th plenary session of the Central Financial and Economic Affairs Commission.

== History ==
During the 2008 financial crisis, Wen Jiabao, then Premier of China pushed for a 4 trillion yuan investment plan, which has since led to a serious overcapacity in related production. For example, China's steel production has reached more than twice the total production of Japan, India, the United States and Russia combined. It is in this context that supply-side structural reform was proposed. Liu He, director of the Central Financial Office, introduced this concept earlier in October 2015 when surveying in Guangdong, pointing out the necessity of "supply-side reform", and the need to quickly eliminate "zombie enterprises" to reduce overcapacity.

== Description ==
The policy aims to "cut overcapacity, reduce inventory, deleveraging, reduce costs, and fill in the gaps", collectively abbreviated as "Three Reductions, One Lowering, and One Supplement". It also stipulates lowering taxes, closing down coal, steel and cement factories inducing overcapacity, alongside stricter control over credits and subsidies in the industries with overcapacity.
