= Sixth plenary session of the 18th Central Committee of the Chinese Communist Party =

Event held in Beijing

Sixth plenary session of the 18th Central Committee of the Chinese Communist Party 中国共产党第十八届中央委员会第六次全体会议
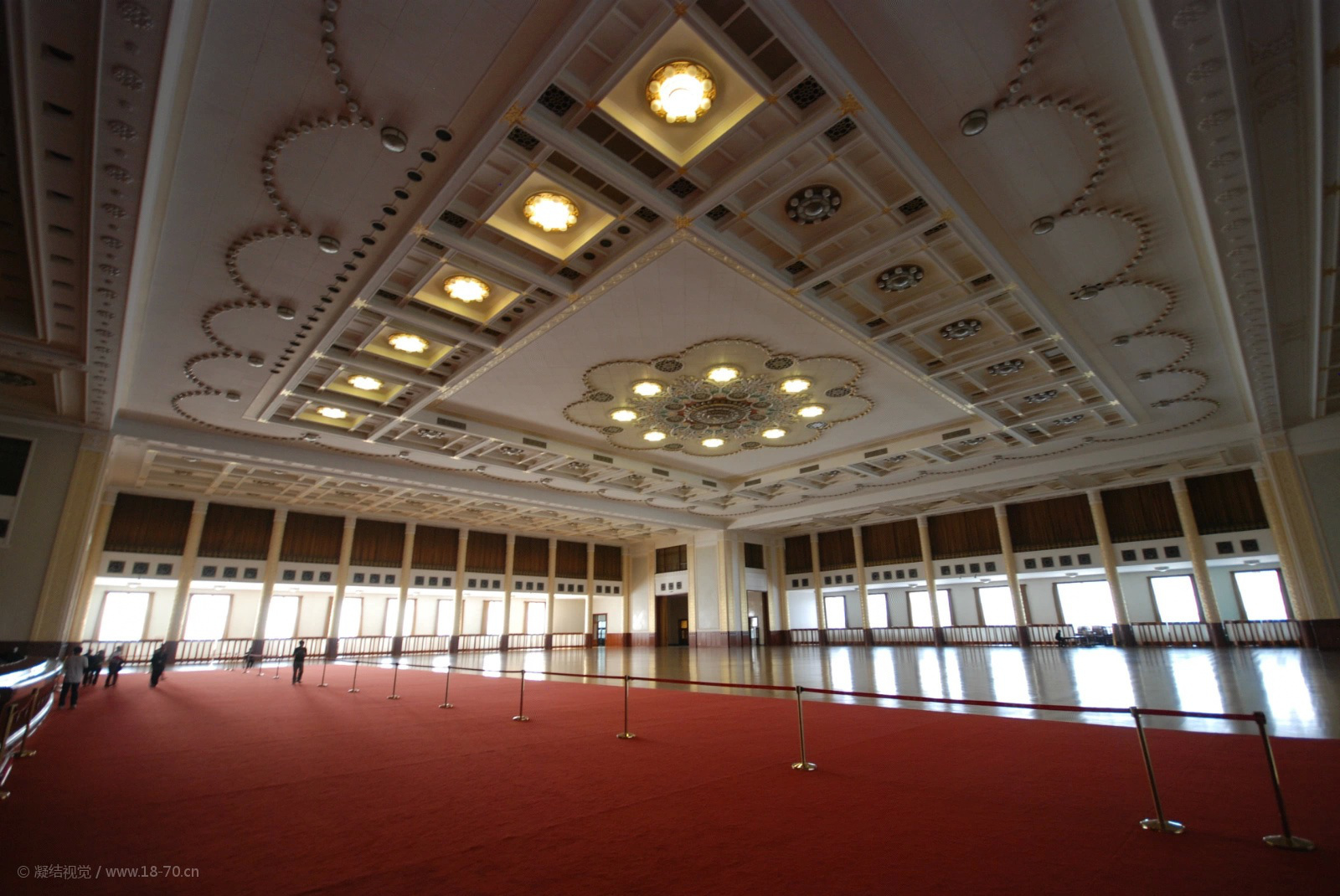
- Panoramic view of the Banquet Hall in the Great Hall of the People
- Date: October 24–27, 2016
- Locations: Banquet Hall, Great Hall of the People, Beijing, China
- Previous event: Fifth plenary session of the 18th Central Committee
- Next event: Seventh plenary session of the 18th Central Committee
- Participants: 197 Central Committee members 151 Central Committee alternate members
- General Secretary: Xi Jinping

Sixth plenary session of the 18th Central Committee of the Chinese Communist Party
- Simplified Chinese: 中国共产党第十八届中央委员会第六次全体会议
- Traditional Chinese: 中國共產黨第十八屆中央委員會第六次全體會議
Transcriptions
Standard Mandarin
- Hanyu Pinyin: Zhōngguó Gòngchǎndǎng Dìshíbā Jiè Zhōngyāng Wěiyuánhuì Dìliùcì Quántǐ Huìyì

Abbreviation
- Simplified Chinese: 中共十八届六中全会
- Traditional Chinese: 中共十八屆六中全會
Transcriptions
Standard Mandarin
- Hanyu Pinyin: Zhōnggòng Shíbājiè Liùzhōng Quánhuì

The sixth plenary session of the 18th Central Committee of the Chinese Communist Party was convened from October 24 to 27, 2016.

== Preparation ==
The CCP Politburo held a meeting on September 27, 2016, to study "major issues of comprehensive and strict governance of the Party". CCP General Secretary Xi Jinping presided over the meeting. The meeting decided that the sixth plenary session of the 18th CCP Central Committee would be held in Beijing from October 24 to 27.

== Meeting ==
The Politburo listened to a report on the solicitation of opinions on the draft "Some Regulations on Intra-Party Political Life under the New Situation" and the "Regulations on Intra-Party Supervision of the Chinese Communist Party" within a certain range within and outside the Party, and decided to submit the draft documents to the Sixth Plenary Session of the 18th CCP Central Committee for deliberation after making revisions based on the opinions discussed at this meeting.

The outside world believes that this plenary session will be a key meeting for personnel arrangements before the 19th CCP National Congress, and a key step in preparing to start a new ruling cycle. The communiqué issued after the meeting first proposed the term " the Party Central Committee with Comrade Xi Jinping as the core ", symbolizing the formal establishment of the "Xi core".

197 CCP Central Committee members and 151 alternate CCP Central Committee members attended the meeting. Members of the CCP Central Commission for Discipline Inspection and responsible persons from relevant departments attended the meeting as observers. Some grassroots comrades and experts and scholars among the delegates to the 18th CCP National Congress also attended the meeting as observers.

At this plenary session, the Politburo reported to the Central Committee on its work. The meeting also studied major issues of comprehensively and strictly governing the Party, formulated the Code of Conduct for Intraparty Political Life Under New Circumstances, and revised the Regulations on Intra-Party Supervision of the Chinese Communist Party (Trial Implementation). It also analyzed and studied the current economic situation and deployed economic work in the second half of the year.

The plenary session decided that the 19th National Congress of the Chinese Communist Party will be held in Beijing in the second half of 2017.

The plenary session confirmed the previous decision of the Politburo to expel Wang Min, Lu Xiwen, Fan Changmi and Niu Zhizhong from the Party. In accordance with the provisions of the Party Constitution, the plenary session decided to appoint Zhao Xiangeng and Xian Hui, alternate members of the Central Committee, as members of the Central Committee.
