= Land finance =

Economic policy common in China

Land finance is a key component of China's economy in various aspects of the country's urban development. Most scholars summarize it as a fiscal operation model in which local governments obtain land transfer fees by selling land use rights and rely on them as a primary source of fiscal revenue, or referring to Chinese local governments' high reliance on various types of land-related financing. Local governments gain substantial financial resources by controlling key stages such as the acquisition, reservation, and transfer of urban construction land. These funds are then invested in urban infrastructure development and the provision of public services, thereby promoting urbanization and economic growth.

== Motivation ==
The objectives of local governments in land transfer are to pursue developmental interests and to maintain social stability. The motivations for land transfer can be summarized as follows:

First, land transfer serves as a means to alleviate fiscal pressure ( Among all feasible approaches, land transfer fees have become the primary source of extra-budgetary income to cover the fiscal deficit resulting from decreases in funding from the central government). Following fiscal decentralization, the mismatch between administrative responsibilities and financial resources has become increasingly pronounced. In response, local governments have adopted the strategy of selling commercial land at high prices to ease budgetary constraints and compensate for insufficient revenue allocations (In 2002, the China central government changed the allocation scheme for income tax, and the income tax (which used to be obtained exclusively by local governments) has been shared between the central and local governments (40% for central government and 60% for local governments) since then. After that reform, local governments have found it even more difficult to make both ends meet, and they tend to increase the pace of land expropriation to obtain more extra-budgetary revenue. Local governments' behavior has changed from being "assisting-oriented" to "grabbing oriented".).

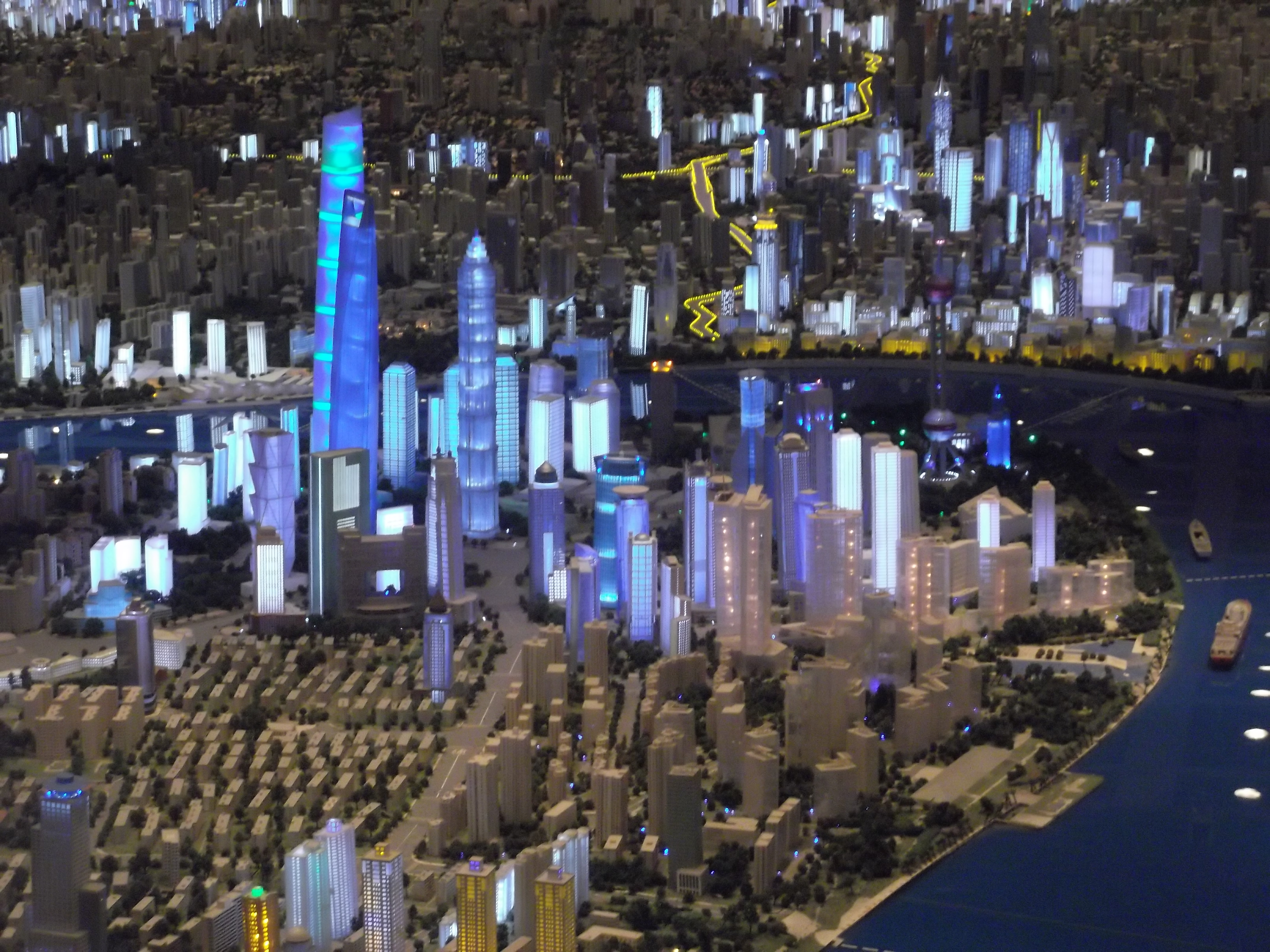
The urban construction model of Shanghai, China

Secondly, land transfer revenue provides a supplementary source of capital for public expenditure (Note: not only in China, land assets have become an important source of financing capital investments by subnational governments in developing countries). For example, in 2019, 38% of local government revenue in China came from land sales and land-backed financing thereby mitigating the constraints of local government budgets. By monetizing land resources, governments are able to expand the supply of public goods, which contributes to improving overall social welfare.

Thirdly, the incentive structure imposed by performance evaluations plays a critical role. Due to the pressure of officials' promotion competition and the performance evaluation by superior governments, local governments are often in a state of rivalry and interaction with each other, especially in regions that are geographically adjacent or have similar economic development levels. These local governments not only have to ensure the economic growth rate, but also have to seek higher rankings over their "peers". Consequently, they have a strong incentive to pursue land finance. This results in a strategic orientation toward land development and management aimed at maximizing fiscal returns.

Consequently, local governments adopt the dual-track approach: selling commercial land at high prices while offering industrial land at lower prices. This strategy facilitates both revenue generation through land sales and capital attraction through preferential land policies, enabling governments to leverage land resources for fiscal and developmental gains.

== Origin ==
China started its reform in 1978, converting the planned economy to a market economy. The marketization of essential production factors, including urban land, played a vital role in this process. Operating on the premise of retaining the State's ultimate ownership of urban land, the land use right market was gradually established beginning in the 1980s. The Land Administration Law in 1986 provided the first official protection of land use rights owned by private enterprises or individuals, and it also explicitly allowed entities/individuals to pay for land use rights. An important milestone was the 1988 amending of the constitution to officially allow for market transactions of land use rights. In the subsequent Property Law in 2007 and the Civil Code in 2020, land use rights are formally recognized as one of the core property rights that are legally protected in China. This series of reforms formally established the separation of urban land ownership and land use rights. The State still holds ultimate ownership of urban land, which is prohibited from trading. However, the land use rights can be transferred, mortgaged, and sold for profit as a bundle of property rights.

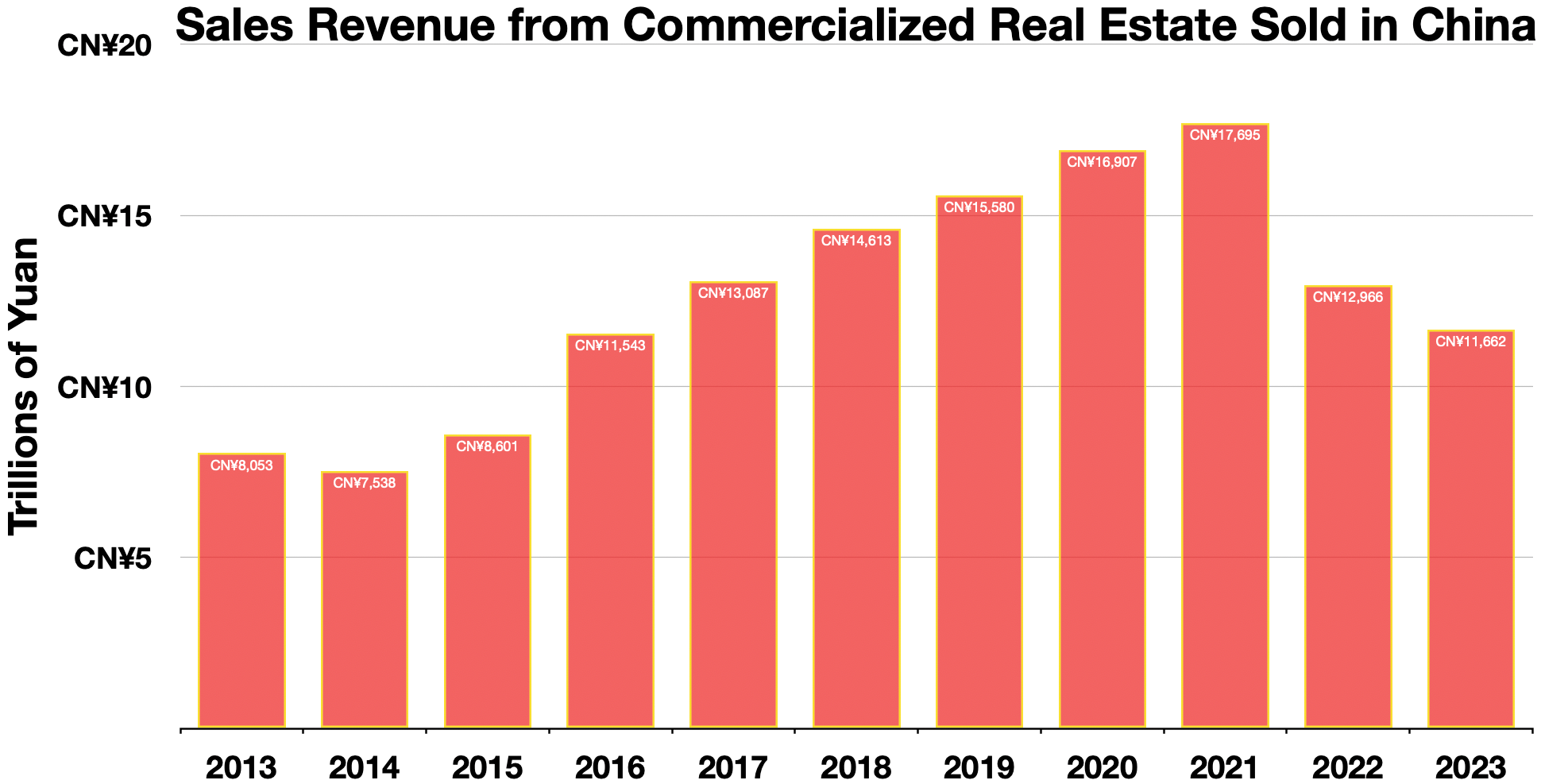
Sales revenue from commercialized real estate sold in China

== Challenges ==
Land finance is an essential tool for China's urbanization and economic growth. However, some problems and changes also occur:

=== The limitation of land resources ===
Land resources are not renewable. With the continuous expansion of cities, some areas have already seen problems such as the shortage of land supply, and the growth rate of land transfer fees has slowed down or even negative growth.

=== Volatility of the real estate market ===
Land finance is highly correlated with the real estate market. On the one hand, local governments obtain income by transferring land to promote real estate development; on the other hand, the appreciation of land value benefits from the real estate development. However, the real estate market is affected by multiple factors such as macroeconomics environment, population mobility, and credit policies, showing greater volatility and cyclicality. At present, affected by factors such as slowing economic growth and weak population growth, China's real estate market slows down, and even shrunk. Many cities have seen frequent auction failures and transactions at reserve prices, and land transfer fees fall sharply.

=== Government debt risk ===
Land finance is an important collateral for local government debt. Many local governments use the expected future land transfer income as the credit basis for repaying urban investment bonds and other debts, and use this to borrow to expand investment and promote urban construction. However, local government debt cannot be unlimited and must be matched with debt repayment capacity. As land finance becomes increasely dependent on debt, the scale of local government debt continues to expand. In 2020, the local government debt in China amounted to 90 trillion yuan (12.49 trillion U.S. dollars), 50% higher than the World Bank and IMF estimated. The huge debt repayment pressure squeezes out other uses of fiscal revenue; once the land market fluctuates and leads to the decline on land transfer fees, the debt repayment fund chain may break, triggering systemic risks.

=== Social equity ===
Land finance exacerbates the income distribution gap, high land prices pushes up housing prices, increased the burden on residents' lives, and caused social inequality. At the same time, the government is keen on selling land to make profit, and may lead to insufficient investment in the supply of basic public services such as education and medical care, which has weakened the inclusiveness of development results.

== See also ==
- Reform and opening up
