= Three red lines =

Chinese financial regulatory guidelines

The three red lines (Simplified Chinese: 三条红线, Traditional Chinese: 三條紅線, Pinyin: sān tiáo hóng xiàn) are financial regulatory guidelines in the People's Republic of China introduced in August 2020 relating to the ratio of debt to cash, equity, and assets. It was introduced to help rein in the highly indebted property-development sector in China, seen especially in large real estate concerns such as Evergrande, which faced a liquidity crisis in Q4 2021.

== History ==
In 2017, Chinese Communist Party (CCP) general secretary Xi Jinping's administration started to tighten the real estate market based on the principle that "houses are for living, not for speculation." These remarks came during the 19th CCP National Congress.

The three red lines were the most stringent regulatory measures based on these remarks. These rules were issued in 2020. They stated property should adhere to the following rules:

- Liabilities should not exceed 70 percent of assets (excluding advance proceeds from projects sold on contract)
- Net debt should not be greater than 100 percent equity.
- Money reserves must be at least 100 percent of short term debt.

If a real estate firm meets all three requirements, it can increase its debt by a maximum of 15 percent the next year.

Since December 2021, borrowing to finance acquisitions and mergers would not be included in red line metrics. This was to help facilitate financially healthier firms to buy assets from indebted companies.

In early 2023, China began softening its approach to the three red lines in an effort to increase market confidence.
