= Yangmiao =

Yangmiao may refer to these places in China:

- Yangmiao, Jiangsu, in Yangzhou, Jiangsu
- Yangmiao, Changfeng County, in Changfeng County, Anhui
- Yangmiao Township, Anhui, in Guzhen County, Anhui
- Yangmiao Township, Henan, in Taikang County, Henan
