= Deng Zhenxiao =

Chinese politician

- 邓真晓

Communist Party Secretary of Bozhou
- In office 19 August 2021 – 28 November 2022
- Party Secretary: Du Yan'an
- Preceded by: Du Yan'an
- Succeeded by: TBA

Personal details
- Born: September 1969 (age 57) Changfeng County, Anhui, China
- Party: Chinese Communist Party
- Education: Party School of CCP Anhui Provincial Committee

Chinese name
- Simplified Chinese: 邓真晓
- Traditional Chinese: 鄧真曉
Transcriptions
Standard Mandarin
- Hanyu Pinyin: Dèng Zhēnxiǎo

Deng Zhenxiao (Chinese: 邓真晓; born September 1969) is a former Chinese politician who served as party secretary of Bozhou from 2021 until 2022, while he was investigated by China's top anti-graft agency.

He was a representative of the 19th National Congress of the Chinese Communist Party.

== Early life and education ==
Deng was born in Changfeng County, Anhui, in September 1969, and graduated from the Party School of CCP Anhui Provincial Committee.

== Political career ==
Deng served in various administrative and political roles in Hefei, capital of Anhui province. He entered the workforce in August 1988, and joined the Chinese Communist Party (CCP) in December 1991.

He became magistrate of Linquan County, a county-level city under the jurisdiction of Fuyang, and then party secretary, the top political position in the city, beginning in September 2014. He also served as chairman of Linquan County People's Congress. In July 2018, he was admitted to member of the Standing Committee of the CCP Fuyang Municipal Committee, the prefecture-level city's top authority.

In March 2021, he was transferred to Bozhou and appointed deputy party secretary. In July, he was named acting mayor, confirmed in the following month.

== Investigation ==
On 28 November 2022, he was put under investigation for alleged "serious violations of discipline and laws" by the Central Commission for Discipline Inspection (CCDI), the party's internal disciplinary body, and the National Supervisory Commission, the highest anti-corruption agency of China.

Government offices
Preceded by Du Yan'an	Communist Party Secretary of Bozhou; 2021–2022	Succeeded by TBA
