= Shi Deru =

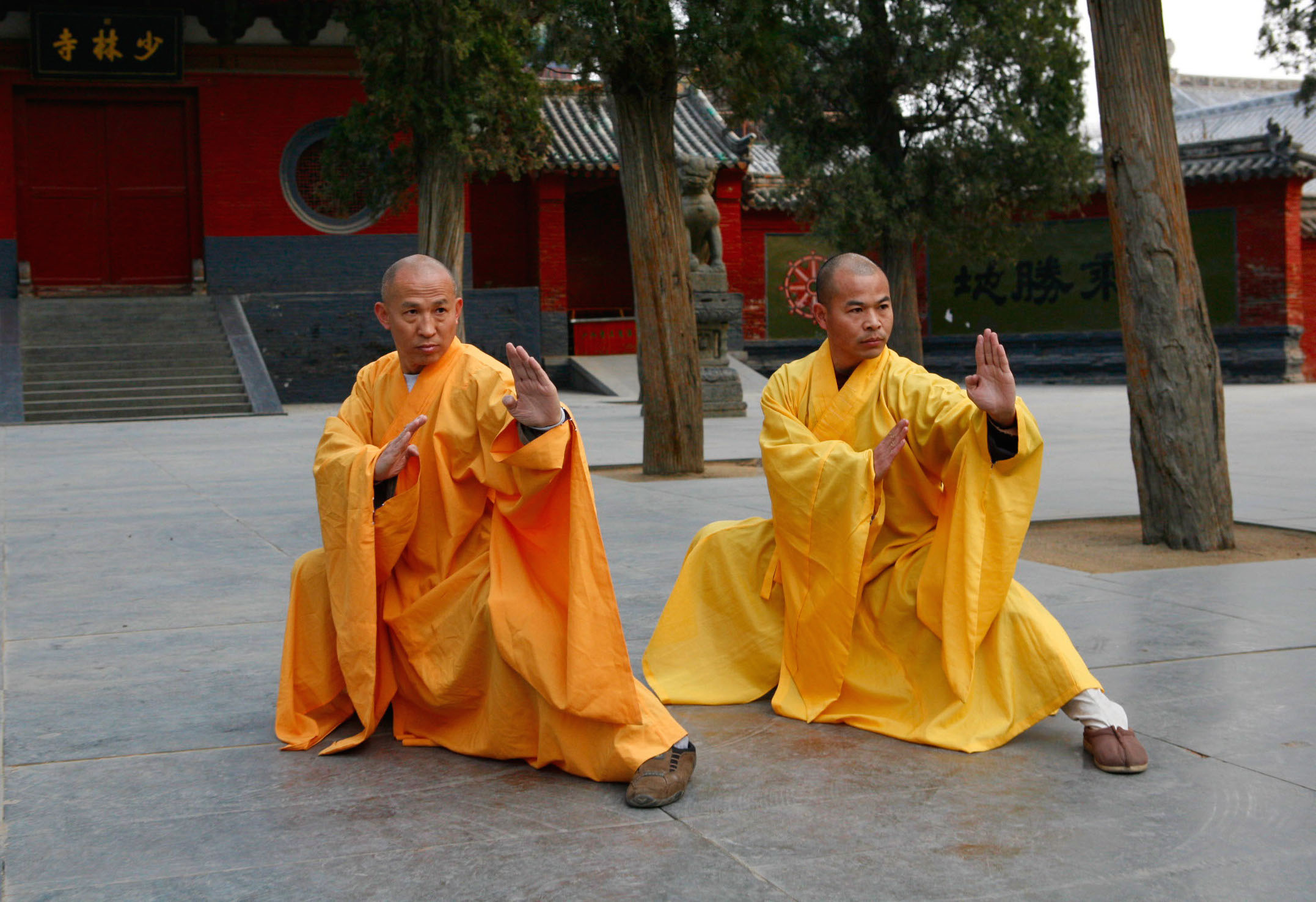
Shi Deru (left) with his Shaolin brother Shi Deyang

Shi Deru (Chinese: 释德如; pinyin: Shì Dérú), born Liu Xiangyang, English name Shawn Liu, is a 31st generation Grandmaster of Shaolin kung fu. He was a close disciple of abbot Shi Suxi, and close Shaolin brother of Shi Deyang. His nickname is "iron leg".

He received an OMD from the Wushu Traditional Chinese School of Medicine in Anhui province, China, in 1978, and a MS in Exercise Physiology from the University of South Alabama in Mobile, Alabama, in 1991.

He was born in China during an era of political upheaval, and he experienced extreme deprivation in early childhood, eating worms and maggots just to survive. He was rescued by Shaolin monks, who taught him their martial arts. Although he is technically a Chinese Buddhist monk, he does not consider himself one, instead stating that he is just "an ordinary Shaolin disciple who happened, since childhood, to have been traveling in Chan."

Known as the "Godfather of American Sanda", he was selected in 1995 to be the head coach of the U.S. Wushu-Kungfu Federation (USAWKF) National Sanshou Team and the Technical Chairman for the Pan American Wushu-Kungfu Federation. Additionally, he served as the chief referee for U.S. National and International sanshou competitions from 1993 to 2003.

In 1999, he opened the Shaolin Institute in Mobile, Alabama, where he teaches kung fu, tai chi, qigong, sanshou, and practices Chinese traditional medicine. Since then, the institute has opened additional campuses in New Orleans and Atlanta. He is one of the first Chinese Masters to have introduced Kungfu Sanda to the UFC, the most famous MMA professional fighting championship platform in the world. Notable alumni of the Shaolin Institute include Cung Le and Patrick Barry, a UFC fighter who studied sanshou with Shi Deru and traveled with him to the Shaolin Temple three times to train.

While traveling during a 2002 cultural exchange to China, he was mistakenly assaulted by townspeople near the Shaolin Temple, who associated him with the appointed abbot Shi Yongxin. He refrained from retaliating and was beaten and stoned until elderly people in the crowd recognized him as a disciple of the previous abbot and intervened.

Since 2008, DeRu has hosted local and regional fighting competitions throughout the Southeast. He founded the nonprofit Shaolin Chan Foundation in 2012 to promote the ancient Shaolin Chan (Zen) Buddhist philosophy and unveil initiate inner intelligence through the wisdom of Chan culture, peace, and compassion. DeRu has been a featured guest lecturer at Harvard University, Beijing University, University of California (Berkeley), The George Washington University, Tulane University, and Georgia Institute of Technology in addition to police academies, military bases, and professional organizations.

As of 2021, DeRu continues to coach, train, and teach traditional Shaolin disciplines and martial arts through the Shaolin Institute while promoting Global Zen Consciousness through the Shaolin Chan Foundation.
