= Hui Ka Yan =

Chinese businessman

- 许家印
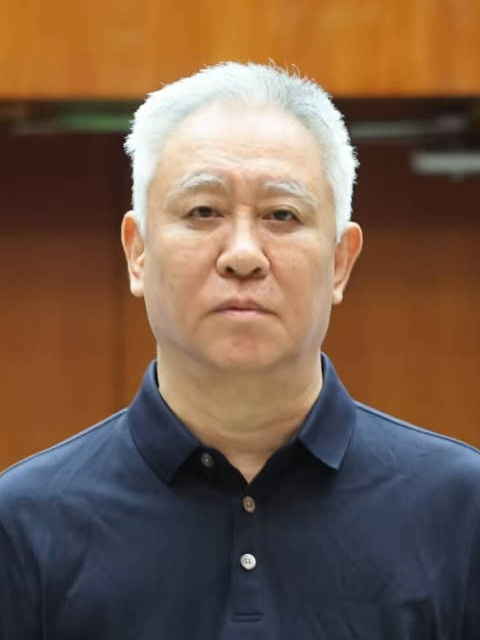
- Hui in 2026 at his trial
- Born: 9 October 1958 (age 67); Taikang County, Zhoukou, Henan, China
- Other name: Xu Jiayin
- Education: Wuhan Institute of Iron and Steel
- Occupations: Businessman, investor
- Title: Chairman and Party Committee secretary, Evergrande Group
- Political party: Chinese Communist Party
- Spouse: Ding Yumei
- Children: 2 or 4

Chinese name
- Traditional Chinese: 許家印
- Simplified Chinese: 许家印
Transcriptions
Standard Mandarin
- Hanyu Pinyin: Xǔ Jiāyìn
- IPA: [ɕỳ tɕjá.în]
Yue: Cantonese
- Yale Romanization: Héui Gāayan
- Jyutping: Heoi2 Gaa1-jan3
- IPA: [hɵɥ˧˥ ka˥.jɐn˧]

Hui Ka Yan (Chinese: 许家印, or Xu Jiayin in Mandarin Chinese; born 9 October 1958) is a Chinese convicted criminal and former businessman. Founder of Evergrande Group, he was a high-profile tycoon whose ventures extended from real estate into sports, entertainment, and beverages, until his arrest in 2023 amid the Chinese real estate crisis. In 2026, he pleaded guilty to charges including embezzlement and corporate bribery, and was sentenced to life imprisonment.

== Early life and education ==
Hui Ka Yan was born from a rural family in Jutaigang Village, Gaoxian Township, Taikang County, Henan, on 9 October 1958. His father is a retired soldier who participated in the Second Sino-Japanese War in the 1930s and 1940s. After the establishment of the communist state, he became a warehouseman in his home village. Hui's mother died of sepsis when he was 8 months old. He was raised by his paternal grandmother. After high school he worked in a cement product factory for a few days and then worked for two years at home. He was the production team leader. After resuming the college entrance examination in 1978, Hui was accepted to Wuhan Institute of Iron and Steel (now Wuhan University of Science and Technology) serving as commissary in charge of hygiene in his class.

== Business career ==
As a fresh graduate in 1982, Hui was assigned to the heat-treatment shop of Wuyang Iron and Steel Company (舞阳钢铁公司), becoming its associate director in 1983 and director in 1985. Hui served as director for seven years there. After resigning in 1992, he moved to Shenzhen, the newly founded special economic zone in southeast China's Guangdong province. He was accepted by a trading company named Zhongda (中达). One year later, he became president of its branch office, named Quanda (全达). On 1 October 1994, Hui moved to Guangzhou, capital of Guangdong province, to establish the Guangzhou Pengda Industrial Co., Ltd. (广州鹏达实业有限公司).

In March 1997 he founded the Evergrande Group, becoming its chairman. Hui is the owner of Guangzhou Evergrande football club, one of China's most successful football clubs.

At its peak of 2017, his fortune is thought to have been $45.3 billion, putting him third on Forbes' 2020 list of the richest Chinese billionaires. However, from 2017 to 2020 his net worth reportedly was estimated to have dropped by more than $20 billion to $21.8 billion primarily due to mounting debts exacerbated by the economic impact of the COVID-19 pandemic. The Hurun China Rich List of October 2021 estimated his personal fortune to be around $11.3 billion in autumn 2021.

=== Evergrande liquidity crisis and resulting detention ===
In the context of the Evergrande liquidity crisis, his net worth had dropped to $6.2 billion by 13 December 2021, according to the Bloomberg Billionaires Index, having lost $17.2 billion on the year, due partly to the sale of personal assets including his US$227-million mansion in London.

On 28 September 2023, Hui was detained by police and under investigation for suspected illegal activity. Trading in Evergrande shares was suspended. He lost his status as a billionaire in October 2023, when Bloomberg estimated his net worth to be $979 million. On 19 March 2024, he was fined $6.5 million for his company's $78 billion revenue overstatement and banned from China's markets for life. On 14 April 2026, it was reported he pleaded guilty on fraud charges, while expressing his regret for his actions. On 20 August 2026, Hui was sentenced to life imprisonment and had all of his personal property confiscated for financial fraud, corruption, and embezzlement. The court also imposed a total fine of CN¥ 15.8 billion on Evergrande Group and its real estate division.

== Political career ==
In 2008, Hui became a member of the Chinese People's Political Consultative Conference (CPPCC) National Committee, the top political advisory body in China. He was promoted to CPPCC National Committee's Standing Committee in 2013, and actively participated in the conventions since then. He attended the 100th anniversary of the Chinese Communist Party in 2021. In November 2022, he skipped a Standing Committee meeting due to the crisis at Evergrande, and was told not to attend the annual meeting of the CPPCC in March 2023.

== Personal life ==
Hui married Ding Yumei (丁玉梅), whom he met at the Wuyang Iron and Steel Company (舞阳钢铁公司). The couple have two publicly known sons, with court documents suggesting two additional children.

Business positions
| New title | Chairman of the Evergrande Group; 1997–present | Incumbent |
| New title | Chairman of the Evergrande Real Estate Group; 1997–2021 | Succeeded by Zhao Changlong (赵长龙) |
Party political offices
| New title | Communist Party Secretary of the Evergrande Group; 2002–present | Incumbent |
