= Xiatang =

Xiatang may refer to the following locations in China:

- Xiatang, Anhui (下塘镇), town in Changfeng County
- Xiatang, Leiyang (夏塘镇), a town of Leiyang City, Hunan
