= Wuhan University of Science and Technology =

University in Wuhan, Hubei, China

Coordinates: 30.6218°N 114.3708°E

- 武汉科技大学
- Motto: 厚德 博学 崇实 去浮
- Motto in English: Cultivate Virtue, Enrich Knowledge, Value Practice, Remove Pretentiousness
- Type: Public
- Established: 1898; 128 years ago
- Location: Wuhan, Hubei, China
- Campus: Urban & Suburban
- Website: www.wust.edu.cn/english/

Wuhan University of Science and Technology
- Simplified Chinese: 武汉科技大学
- Traditional Chinese: 武漢科技大學
Transcriptions
Standard Mandarin
- Hanyu Pinyin: Wǔhàn Kējì Dàxué

The Wuhan University of Science and Technology (WUST; 武汉科技大学) is a provincial public university in Wuhan, Hubei, China. It is affiliated with the province of Hubei. The university is co-sponsored by the Hubei Provincial People's Government, the Ministry of Education, SASTIND, and six state-owned corporations.

== History ==
The history of WUST dates back to the Hubei Technical Institute (湖北工艺学堂; 湖北工藝學堂; Húběi Gōngyì Xuétáng), which was founded in 1898 by Zhang Zhidong in the late Qing Dynasty.

In 1958, it was renamed as Wuhan Iron and Steel University (武汉钢铁学院; 武漢鋼鐵學院; Wǔhàn Gāngtiě Xuéyuàn) and began to offer four-year degree programs. At that time, it affiliated with the Ministry of Metallurgy. The affiliation was revoked in 1998, and the university is now governed by the Hubei provincial education department and the Ministry of Education.

From 1990 to 1994, the China-Australia Iron and Steel Industry Training Centre (中澳钢铁工业培训中心; 中澳鋼鐵工業培訓中心; Zhōng ào gāngtiě gōngyè péixùn zhōngxīn) was established at the Wuhan Iron and Steel University, as part of a joint venture between the governments of Australia and China. The centre trained over 4500 managers and technicians from the iron and steel industry in a general management course.

In 1995, the college became Wuhan Metallurgy University of Science and Technology (武汉冶金科技大学; 武漢冶金科技大學; Wǔhàn yějīn kējì Dàxué) with the merger of Wuhan Iron and Steel University, Wuhan Advanced Construction School (武汉建筑高等专科学校; 武漢建築高等專科學校; Wǔhàn jiànzhù gāoděng zhuānkē xuéxiào) and Wuhan Medical School of Metallurgy (武汉冶金医学高等专科学校; 武漢冶金醫學高等專科學校; Wǔhàn yějīn yīxué gāoděng zhuānkē xuéxiào).

In 1999, it became known as Wuhan University of Science and Technology. WUST is authorized to confer 60 bachelor's degree programs, 30 doctoral degree programs, 104 master's degree programs as well as master's degree programs of Engineering in 17 fields. Among those, 15 first-class master's degree were ranked top 50 and 2 first-class master's degrees (Metallurgy Engineering and Mining Engineering) were ranked top 10 by the Degree of Ministry of Education & Postgraduate Education Development Center in 2012.

The university has established many high-level research centers, including one national key laboratories and 12 experimental centers with big enterprises such as Wuhan Iron and Steel Corporation, Panzhihua Iron and Steel, Liuzhou Iron and Steel, and Handan Iron and Steel.

== Academics ==
=== Schools and Colleges ===
- School of Materials and Metallurgy (材料与冶金学院)
- School of Machinery and Automation (机械自动化学院)
- School of Resources and Environmental Engineering (资源与环境工程学院)
- School of Information Science and Engineering (信息科学与工程学院)
- School of Computer Science and Technology (计算机科学与技术学院)
- School of Chemical Engineering and Technology (化学与化工学院)
- School of Automobile and Traffic Engineering (汽车与交通工程学院)
- School of Science (理学院)
- Evergrande School of Management (恒大管理学院)
- School of Art and Design (艺术与设计学院)
- School of Arts, Law and Economics (文法与经济学院)
- School of Foreign Language (外国语学院)
- School of Urban Construction (城市建设学院)
- Medical School (医学院)
- International College (国际学院)
- College of Life Sciences and Health (生命科学与健康学院)

=== Faculty and Staff ===
- Staff: 2,600
- Faculty: 1,600
- Member of Academician of China (double engaged): 8
- Member of "Chu Tian Scholar Program" Professor: 32
- Member of Professor and Assistant Professor: 900

== Notable alumni ==
- Xu Jiayin, Chinese businessman, and former chairman of Evergrande Group, a defunct Chinese real estate developer.
- Liu Jie, Academician of the Chinese Academy of Engineering, Former Chancellor of the An steel Group

== Campus ==
- Qingshan Campus (青山校区), 947 Heping Avenue, Qingshan District, Wuhan, China
- Huangjiahu Campus (黄家湖校区), Hongshan District, Wuhan, China

== Student life ==
=== Student demographics ===
Full-time students: 24,764

=== Athletics ===
WUST Women's basketball team has won several national championships in CUBA and won the "President Cup" in the fifth and sixth China University Students Sports meetings successively.

== Services ==
=== Hospitals ===
- Wuhan Tianyou Hospital (Affiliated Medical College of WUST) category: IIIA | National

=== Libraries ===
- Founded in 1958, it is one of the large libraries in the universities in Hubei Province.
- The Library in Qingshan Old Campus has seven floors, occupying an area of 11,000 square meters, plus the library branch in School of Construction and School of Medicine, the total area can achieve 16,000 square meters. The library has 20 reading rooms, and 2,400 reading seat, can receive at a maximum of 4,000 readers every day. It is the orange building in the top photo.
- Nowadays, the whole library stores about 1,000,000 literature, of which 880,000 books, foreign periodicals about 100,000 volumes, video literature 1,000 copies, electrical literature 8,000 kinds. Every year, 1,200 kinds of Chinese and foreign literature are subscribed, and the amount increases at the speed of 12,000 volumes per year.

== Cooperative Educational Institutions ==
- University of Pittsburgh
- Washburn University
- University of Bridgeport
- Hanyang University
