= Shihu Township, Anhui =

Shihu Township 石湖乡
- Township
- Location in China
- Coordinates: 33°18′52″N 117°25′36″E
- Country: People's Republic of China
- Province: Anhui
- Prefecture-level city: Bengbu
- County: Guzhen County
- Time zone: UTC+8 (China Standard)

Shihu Township (simplified Chinese: 石湖乡; traditional Chinese: 石湖鄉; pinyin: Shíhú Xiāng) is a township in Guzhen County, Anhui, China. As of 2020, it administers Shihu Residential Neighborhood and the following ten villages:

- Qihu Village (齐湖村)
- Dingxiang Village (丁巷村)
- Sangwei Village (桑圩村)
- Zhonghuang Village (钟黄村)
- Liuyuan Village (刘元村)
- Chenqiao Village (陈桥村)
- Xuci Village (徐祠村)
- Dougou Village (陡沟村)
- Houma Village (后马村)
- Kanghu Village (康湖村)
