= Diana Bridge =

New Zealand poet (born 1942)

Diana Bridge (born 1942 in Wellington) is a New Zealand poet.

She attended Queen Margaret College and Victoria University of Wellington. She lived most of her adult life in various parts of Asia, including India and China, and as an adult she completed a PhD in classical Chinese poetry at the Australian National University. She began writing poetry in her 50s.

In 2010 she was awarded the Lauris Edmond Memorial Award for her distinguished contribution to New Zealand poetry. In 2014 her essay "An attachment to China" won the Landfall Essay Competition. In 2015, she completed a residency at the Writers' and Artists' Colony at Yaddo in New York. She won the Sarah Broom Poetry Prize in the same year.

She shared her poem Dream Sound for Chinese language week in 2021.

== Selected works ==
- Landscape with lines (1996)
- The girls on the wall (1999)
- Porcelain (2001)
- Red leaves (2005)
- An unexpected legacy: Xie Tiao's 'poems on things' (2008) – translation of works by Chinese poet Xie Tiao
- Aloe & other poems (2009)
- In the supplementary garden: new and selected poems (2016)
- Two or more islands (2019)
