= Shi Suxi =

Chinese Buddhist priest

Shi Suxi 释素喜
- Born: Geng Jinzhu (Chinese: 耿金柱); 24 September 1924 (Chinese lunar calendar) / October 25, 1924 (Gregorian); Dengfeng, Henan, China
- Died: March 9, 2006 (aged 81)
- Occupation: 30th Generation Shaolin Monk
- Predecessor: Student of Shi Chenxu; preceded by abbots Shi Xingzheng (official) and Shi Dechan (honorary)

Shi Suxi (释素喜), born Geng Jinzhu (耿金柱: Dengfeng, 24 September 1924 (Chinese lunar calendar) – 9 March 2006 (Gregorian) / 9 February (Chinese lunar)) was a Chinese Buddhist priest, and abbot of the Shaolin Monastery. His disciples include Shi De Yang, current master of the fighting monks, and Shi Deru. Thanks to the efforts of Suxi and a few other monks, the history of Shaolin was preserved through a long drought in Dengfeng and the Chinese Cultural Revolution.

At the age of 30 or 31 Suxi suffered a stroke, and was later diagnosed with Parkinson's disease. Around 1983 he began to lose some control in his legs and feet, but he continued to practice and teach kung fu until late in his life. His health continued to decline in the 1990s, causing him to resign as abbot, but despite being using a wheelchair and having speech difficulties he continued to teach verbally on the importance of Chan and martial arts.

Shortly before his death, Suxi was visited by the appointed abbot of the Shaolin Monastery, Shi Yongxin. Suxi held Yongxin's hand and said, "Shaolin is Chan [zen], not martial arts." (Chinese: 少林是禅不是拳; pinyin: Shàolín shì Chán, bùshì Quán) These are widely regarded as his message to future generations and are a theme he repeated throughout his career.
