= Shi De Yang =

Chinese Buddhist priest

Shi De Yang 释德扬
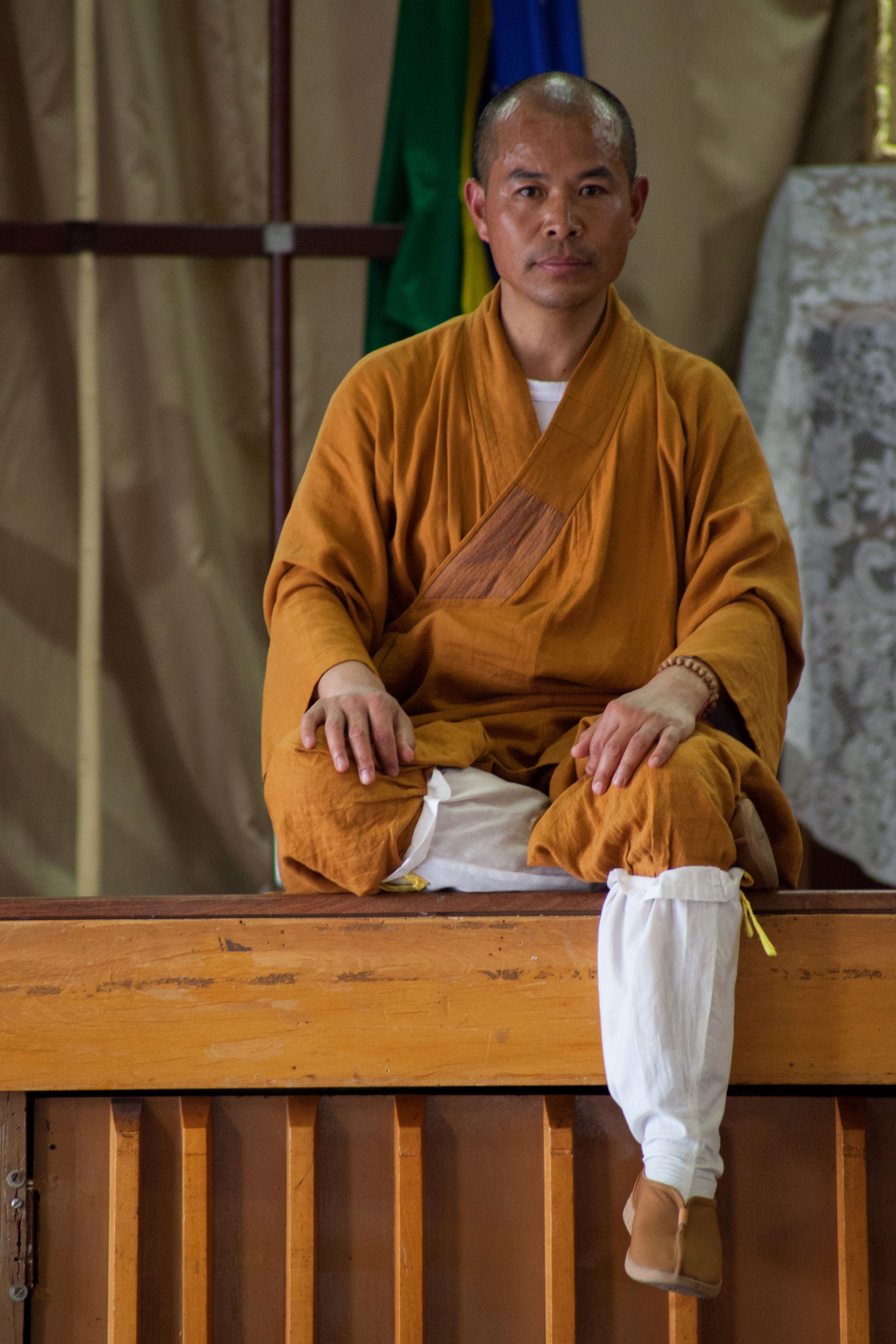
- Grand Master Shi De Yang
- Born: Shi Wanfeng; 1968 (age 57–58); Taikang, Henan, China
- Family: 31st Generation Shaolin Monk

Shi De Yang (Chinese: 释德扬), born Shi Wanfeng (史万峰; Taikang, 1968) is a Chinese Buddhist priest said to be the 31st Grand Master of the fighting monks (wǔsēng 武僧) of the Shaolin Monastery.

== Biography ==
Shi Wanfeng (史万峰) was born in Taikang County in 1968. He was disciple of Shi Suxi for almost 30 years, studying the "Three Shaolin Treasures” : Chan (religion), Wu (martial arts) and Yi (traditional medicine). In August 1991 he began to work as the head coach of the Shaolin Warrior Monks.

De Yang is currently the vice president of the Association of study of Shaolin Kung Fu in China and assessor of the International Shaolin Kung Fu & Wushu Federation. He is headmaster of Shaolin Temple International Wushu Institute (中国少林寺国际武术学院) registered by the Henan Province and Zhengzhou City governments in Dengfeng in 1980. He is also one of the instructors at Dengfeng Wuseng Houbeidui (Shàolínsì Wǔsēng Hòubèiduì 少林寺武僧后备队) in China and the Europe Branch Shaolin Cultural Center in Italy and Switzerland. He is involved in transmitting traditional Shaolin kung fu around the world. Countries that he has visited include Italy, England, Hungary, Argentina, Uruguay, Mexico, and Canada. Several schools around the world have affiliated to the Shaolin Temple.

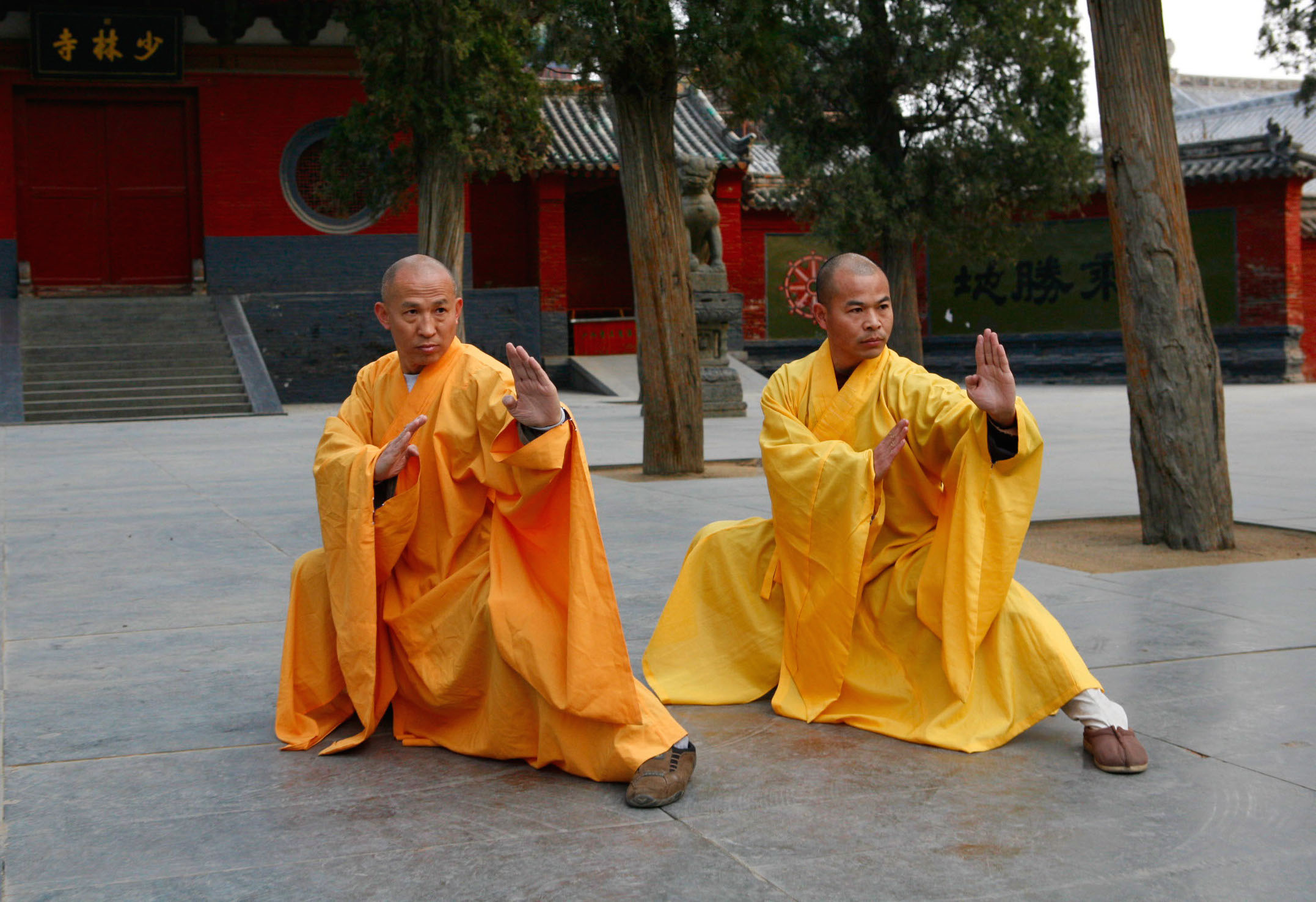
Shaolin Grand Masters Shi De Yang (right) and Shi De Ru (left), close disciples of the Great Master Shi Suxi

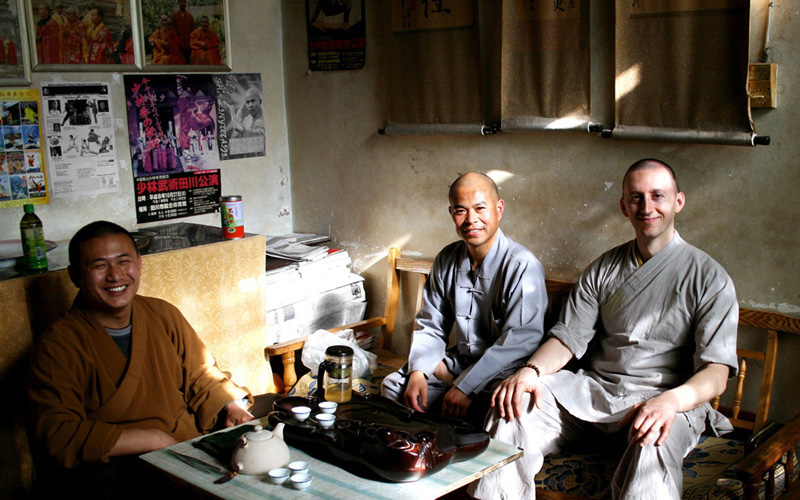
Shaolin Grand Master Shi De Yang in his Shaolin Temple room with disciples Shi Xing Mi (right) and Shi Xing Qiu (left)
