= Su Xiaoxiao =

Ancient Chinese female singer and poet

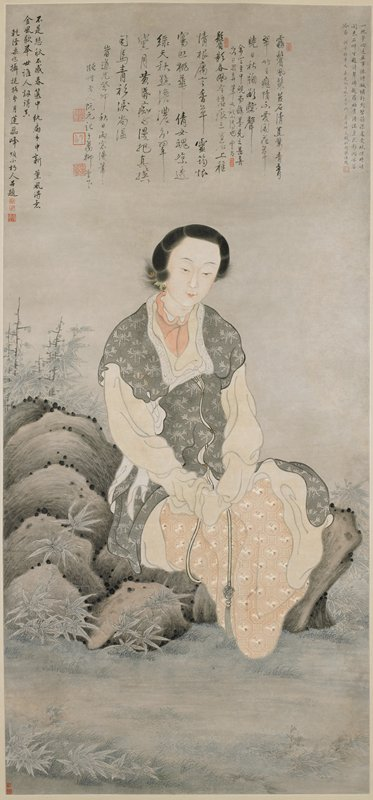
- The Singer Su Xiaoxiao (1746) by Kang Tao
- Born: c.479
- Died: c.501
- Occupations: courtesan, poet
- Notable work: Song of the West Tomb

Su Xiaoxiao (Chinese: 蘇小小) (c.479 – c.501), also known by the appellations "Little Su" and "Su Xiao," was a Chinese courtesan and poet from Qiantang City (modern-day Hangzhou, Zhejiang Province) during the Southern Qi Dynasty.

== Life ==
Renowned for her intellectual talent and exceptional beauty, Su Xiaoxiao embodied the values of love, beauty, and humanity, which are evident in her writings and the popular stories associated with her. Numerous tales surround her life, though the historical accuracy of any specific story remains uncertain.

Su Xiaoxiao was born into a prosperous family in Qiantang. Her ancestors had served as officials during the Eastern Jin Dynasty. Following the fall of the Jin Dynasty, her family settled in Qiantang, using their gold, silver, and jewelry as capital to establish a successful business.

As the only daughter of her parents, Su Xiaoxiao was cherished deeply and regarded as the apple of their eye. Her petite stature earned her the name "Xiaoxiao." Although the Su family were merchants, they upheld their ancestral tradition of valuing education and literature. Su Xiaoxiao, being intelligent and keen, was greatly influenced by this heritage and learned to read and compose poetry from a young age.

However, her happy childhood was cut short when her parents died when she was just 15 years old. Following their deaths, Su Xiaoxiao lived with her aunt in a house near West Lake. Deeply attached to the natural beauty of the region, she led a tranquil life, spending her days exploring the mountains and rivers, composing poetry, and painting.

To support herself, Su Xiaoxiao worked as a courtesan, captivating audiences with her singing and forming friendships through her poetry.

One spring day, while riding in an oil-walled cart during an outing, she arrived at the Broken Bridge. There, she encountered a young man riding a qingcong horse (青骢马). Startled by Su Xiaoxiao's cart, the horse jolted, causing the young man to fall. This man was Ruan Yu, the son of Prime Minister Ruan Dao (阮道). Ruan Yu had been tasked with a mission in eastern Zhejiang and was passing through Hangzhou, taking the opportunity to visit West Lake.

The two fell in love at first sight. Ruan Yu (阮郁) soon visited Su Xiaoxiao's home and confessed his love for her. With the support of Su Xiaoxiao's aunt, the two were married. Their love for each other was profound and unwavering. After the wedding, Ruan Yu informed his family about the marriage through a letter.

When Ruan Dao, Ruan Yu's father, learned that his son had married a courtesan, he was furious to the point of nearly fainting. However, given the great distance and the lack of convenient transportation, Ruan Dao was unable to immediately intervene. Forced to bide his time, he devised a cunning plan to separate the couple.

Pretending to accept the marriage, Ruan Dao wrote a seemingly sincere letter to Ruan Yu, praising Su Xiaoxiao as a talented and exceptional woman. He expressed that, despite her humble status, he had no objections to the union. Upon receiving the letter, Ruan Yu and Su Xiaoxiao were overjoyed, believing that Ruan Dao had genuinely approved of their marriage. They continued their lives together in peace, unaware of his true intentions.

After some time, Ruan Dao sent a second letter to his son, falsely claiming that he was gravely ill and bedridden. Concerned for his father's health, Su Xiaoxiao urged Ruan Yu to return home to care for him. Deeply worried, Ruan Yu traveled day and night to reach his father, only to find Ruan Dao in perfect health.

Before Ruan Yu could grasp the situation, his father scolded him harshly and ordered him to be confined to the study. Despite Ruan Yu's protests and heartfelt pleas, he was unable to resist his father's will. Ruan Dao ultimately forced him to remarry a woman of higher social standing.

Heartbroken and abandoned, Su Xiaoxiao was left to live alone. She spent her days in solitude, finding solace in poetry, wine, and the dim glow of a solitary lamp, as she mourned the loss of her love.

After Ruan Yu left, Su Xiaoxiao fell gravely ill. Around this time, Meng Lang (孟浪), the observation envoy from Shangjiang, arrived in Qiantang on official business. Having long admired Su Xiaoxiao's reputation, he repeatedly sent invitations for her to visit his residence, but she declined each time. Dissatisfied, Meng Lang considered using his authority to have her forcibly brought to him.

The county magistrate, who had a friendly relationship with Su Xiaoxiao, secretly advised her to apologize to Meng Lang to avoid deeper conflict with a high-ranking official. Reluctantly, Su Xiaoxiao agreed, recognizing the danger of defying someone in his position.

On the appointed day, she visited Meng Lang's residence dressed in simple, modest attire, appearing pale and frail. Meng Lang was struck by her pitiful yet captivating presence but, being a proud and petty man, decided to test her. In the courtyard, a red plum tree was in full bloom, and Meng Lang ordered Su Xiaoxiao to compose a poem on the theme of the red plum.

Without hesitation, Su Xiaoxiao crafted a poem that was neither servile nor defiant. Her words conveyed both her unyielding spirit and a subtle deference to Meng Lang's authority. Impressed by her intelligence and grace, Meng Lang let the matter drop and chose not to trouble her further. In this way, Su Xiaoxiao's talent and charm turned a potentially dangerous situation into a peaceful resolution.

On one occasion, while burning incense at a temple, Su Xiaoxiao encountered Bao Ren (鲍仁), a poor scholar. Moved by his plight, she gave him money to help him travel and prepare for the imperial examination.

Bao Ren successfully passed the examination and was later appointed as the governor of Huazhou. Grateful for Su Xiaoxiao's kindness, he made a special trip to Qiantang to express his gratitude. Unfortunately, by the time he arrived, Su Xiaoxiao had already died.

In accordance with her final wish—"Born in Xiling, died in Xiling, buried in Xiling, worthy of the beautiful landscape"—Bao Ren ensured that she was buried beside the Xiling Bridge, fulfilling her desire to rest eternally in her homeland.

== Legacy ==
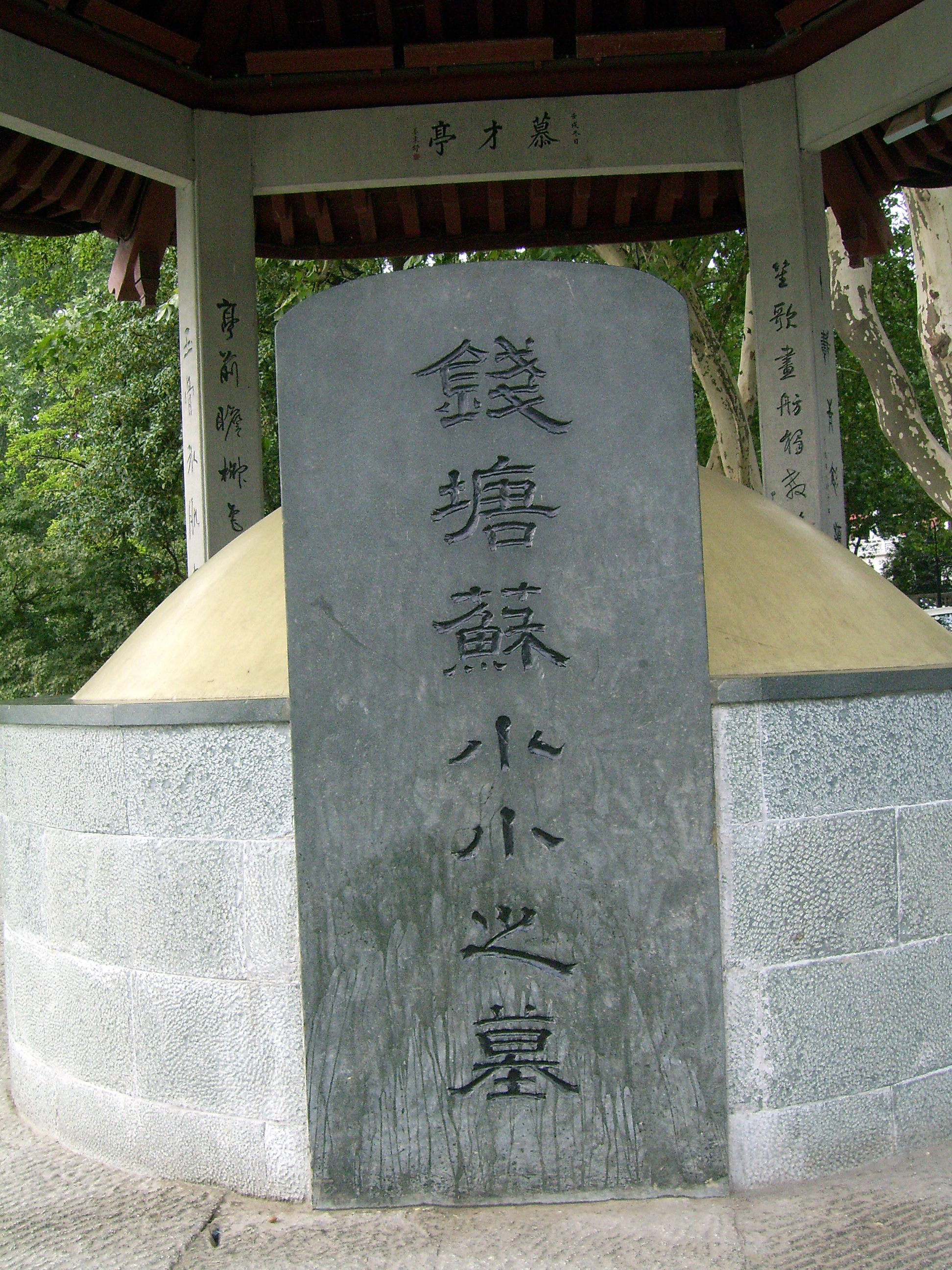
Su Xiaoxiao's rebuilt tomb, 2004

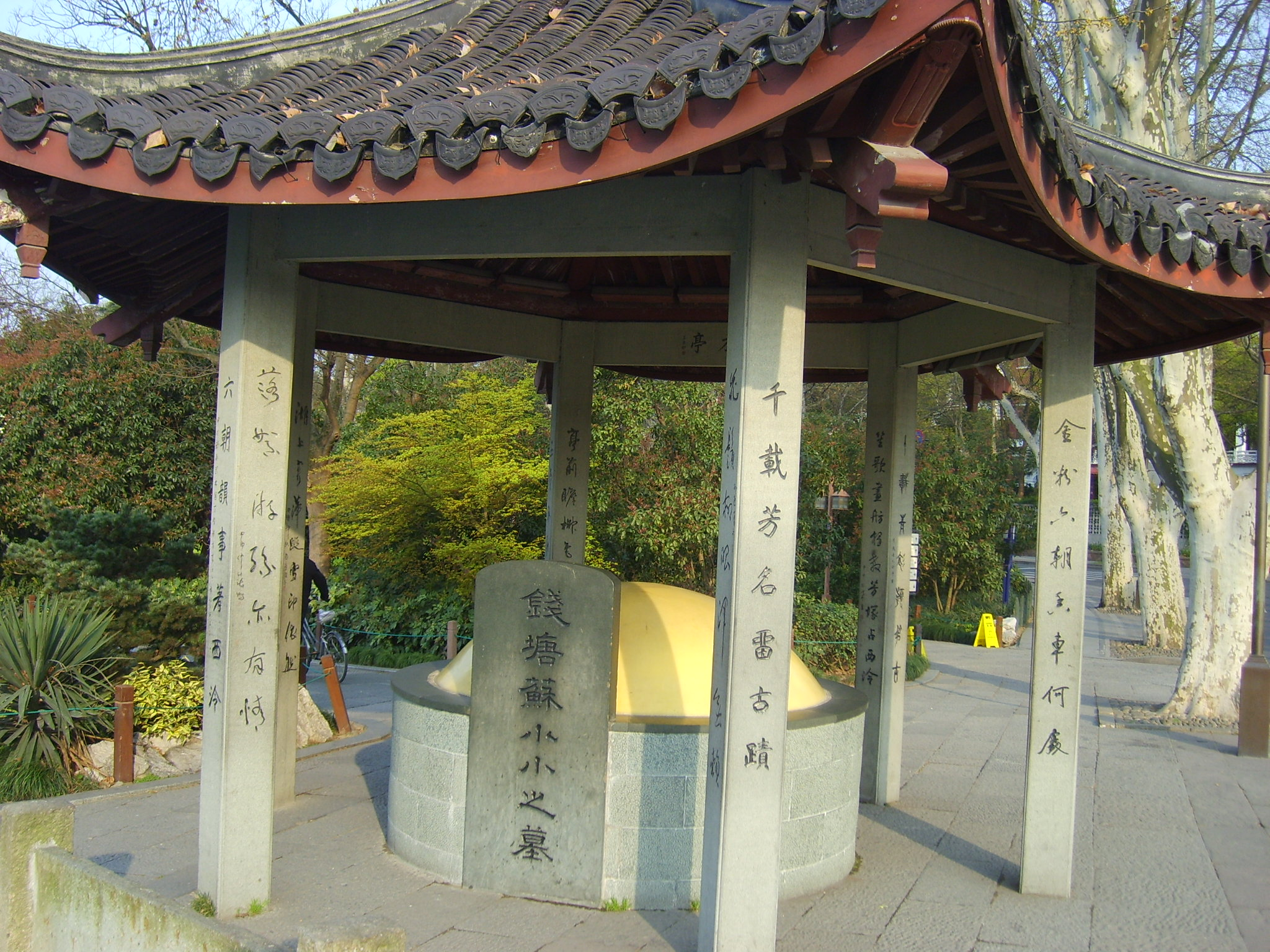
Another view of Su's tomb, 2009

Su Xiaoxiao succumbed to a terminal illness, leaving behind a legacy of beauty and talent with her untimely death. For over a thousand years, her tomb was located near the Xiling Bridge, close to the West Lake she loved.

Su Xiaoxiao's life and poetry have inspired many Chinese writers and artists throughout history. She became a romantic heroine for Tang dynasty poets such as Bai Juyi, Li He, and Wen Tingyun, as well as Ming dynasty writer Zhang Dai. She was also the central figure in the story "Romantic Trails of Xiling" from Fine Stories of the West Lake.

A woodcut of unknown origin, inspired by the short story "Dreaming of Qiantang", was used to decorate porcelain objects during the Ming and early Qing dynasties. The story recounts how the scholar Sima Yu, while visiting Hangzhou, dreamt of Su Xiaoxiao being brought to his window by three gusts of wind to sing for him.

Su Xiaoxiao has also been a popular subject in Chinese theater, where her story has been retold and reimagined in various forms over the centuries.

In 1780, during his southern tour of Hangzhou, Emperor Qianlong inquired about Su Xiaoxiao's tomb. Four years later, in 1784, he visited her tomb again during another southern tour. By that time, her tomb had been reconstructed as an octagonal stone structure. Emperor Qianlong's interest and visits elevated what might have been an ordinary act of commemoration into a ritual with symbolic significance. As a result, Su Xiaoxiao's tomb near West Lake became firmly embedded in collective memory and cultural heritage.

The Qing Dynasty scholar Yuan Mei greatly admired the famous courtesan Su Xiaoxiao and had a seal carved that read, "Qiantang Su Xiaoxiao is a fellow villager." One day, a minister visited Yuan Mei to request a poem. Yuan Mei immediately offered a poetry collection as a gift, accidentally stamping the seal on the booklet. Upon seeing the seal, the minister's face changed drastically, and he angrily criticized Yuan Mei, believing that by using the seal, Yuan Mei was claiming to be a fellow courtesan. He considered it highly disrespectful and inappropriate. At first, Yuan Mei apologized repeatedly, but the minister remained unforgiving. Yuan Mei then retorted firmly, "Do you think this private seal is inappropriate? From your perspective, you are a high-ranking official, and Su Xiaoxiao's status was much humbler. However, I fear that a hundred years from now, people will only remember Su Xiaoxiao, but not you." The minister was enraged by this response, but the audience burst into laughter.

By the early republican period, Su's tomb consisted of a circular base of ashlar stone surmounted with brick and covered with an open pavilion. It was destroyed by high-school Red Guards on 23 August 1966 during the Cultural Revolution as part of their programme of eradicating the "Four Olds" from Chinese society. Following Deng Xiaoping's Reform and Opening Up Policy, it was subsequently rebuilt as a similar but empty plaster-covered tomb under a new pavilion in 2004. The new pavilion features twelve posts covered with poetry, each handwritten by famous calligraphers. The current tomb is empty.

Today, Su Xiaoxiao's tomb is a popular tourist attraction in Hangzhou. The pavilion under which the tomb is housed is called Mucaiting. However, the name can be phonetically misread as "Mocaiting" (meaning "touch for wealth"), so many tourists pass by and purposefully touch or throw coins onto the tomb, hoping for wealth and prosperity.

== Poem by Su Xiaoxiao ==
This poem is known by various titles, including "Song of the West Tomb," "Song of Xiling Lake," "Song of Su Xiaoxiao" (in a collection of Music Bureau poems), and "Song of the Same Heartbeat." It became widely recognized and inspired many future poets, including those mentioned above. The original text is a quatrain, composed of four lines, each containing five words.

妾乘油壁車,
郎跨青驄馬,
何處結同心,
西泠松柏下。

I ride in a decorated carriage,
My darling rides a blue-white horse.
Where should we tie the knot for our heart?
Under the Xiling pine and cypress.

== In media ==
In 1962, Chinese director Lee Sun-fung directed a film about Su Xiaoxiao, titled Su Xiaoxiao (also known as Miss Su in some regions). Malaysian-born actress Yan Pak played the title role.

A poem dedicated to Su Xiaoxiao, titled A Su Xiaoxiao, was written by Italian author Sabrina Gatti and appears in the collection La pioggia sui vetri (2011).

== See also ==
- West Lake
- Yongming poetry
