= Gaoxian Township =

Gaoxian Township 高贤乡
- Township
- Location in Henan
- Coordinates: 34°13′14″N 114°44′23″E
- Country: People's Republic of China
- Province: Henan
- Prefecture-level city: Zhoukou
- County: Taikang County

Area
  - Total: 71.9 km^{2} (27.8 sq mi)

Population (2015)
  - Total: 49,000
  - Density: 680/km^{2} (1,800/sq mi)
- Time zone: UTC+08:00 (China Standard)
- Postal code: 461499
- Area code: 0394

Gaoxian Township (simplified Chinese: 高贤乡; traditional Chinese: 高賢鄉; pinyin: Gāoxián Xiāng) is a rural township in Taikang County, Henan, China. As of the 2015 census it had a population of 49,000 and an area of 71.9-square-kilometre (27.8 sq mi). It is surrounded by Longqu Township on the northeast, Wangji Township on the east, Zhimawa Township on the west, Zhulin Township and Banmu Township on the north, and Qingji Township on the south.

== History ==
Gaoxian was named after Gao Chai (Chinese: 高柴), one of 72 renowned disciples of Confucius.

After the founding of the Communist State, it was renamed Gaoxian Commune in 1958.

It was upgraded to a township in 1983.

== Administrative division ==
As of 2017, the township is divided into 29 villages: Gaonan Village, Liusigang Village, Gaoxi Village, Gaodong Village, Zhangbei Village, Tiandian Village, Zhangxi Village, Zhangzhuang Village, Xiaozhuang Village, Nanwa Village, Nanbeiliu Village, Nancungang Village, Dayangzhuang Village, Waliu Village, Panzhai Village, Zhougang Village, Zhangdong Village, Liuhe Village, Xiaoguo Village, Wangzhuang Village, Wangzhuang Village, Jianzhuang Village, Lucun Village, Xiaolou Village, Qiancheng Village, Kaozhugang Village, Baodu Village, Wangzhuang Village, Zhangzhai Village and Jutaigang Village.

== Economy ==
The local economy is primarily based upon agriculture and local industry. Wheat, maize, peanut and cotton are the main crops.

Beef, mutton and Tobacco are important to the economy.

== Transportation ==
The town is connected to one national highway and one provincial highway: G106 National Highway and S326 Luotong Provincial Highway.

== Attractions ==
The Pagoda of Shousheng Temple (Chinese: 寿圣寺塔) is a famous scenic spot in the area. It was built in 1033, during the Northern Song dynasty (960–1127). it has been designated as one of the Major National Historical and Cultural Sites in Henan" by the State Council of China.

== Notable people ==
- Xu Jiayin (born 9 October 1958), Chinese entrepreneur.

== See also ==
- List of township-level divisions of Henan
