= Xie Tiao =

Chinese poet (464–499)

Xie Tiao (traditional Chinese: 謝朓; simplified Chinese: 谢朓; pinyin: Xiè Tiào), courtesy name Xuan Hui (玄辉; 464–499) was the leading Southern Qi poet of the Yongming reign. He was known as "Xiao Xie" (that is, "Little Xie") in comparison with Xie Lingyun.

== Life ==
His family hailed from Yangxia County, Henan; Xie Tiao lived in the realm of Southern Qi during the Northern and Southern dynasties period. He was a master of the five-syllable style and excelled at landscape poetry, writing a number of poems which focused on "mountains and streams." He was eventually maligned, arrested, and died in prison aged 35.

== Family ==
Xie was born in a noble family. His father, Xie Wei (谢纬) was a shilang (侍郎, assistant minister) and his mother was princess of Empire Songwen. Xie was hard-working when he was young. He was known for his articles.

== Works ==
Xie left nearly 200 poems. Most of them are about the beauty of nature, and are famous for their details and vivid description. Examples include "余霞散成绮，澄江静如练" and "天际识归舟，云中辨江树".

Some of his poems have been translated into English by New Zealand poet Diana Bridge.

== Bibliography ==
- Xiong, Victor Cunrui (2017). Historical Dictionary of Medieval China (2nd ed.). Lanham, Maryland; New York City; London: Rowman & Littlefield.
