= Guzhen County =

Coordinates: 33°14′37″N 117°22′11″E

Guzhen 固镇县 Kuchen
- County
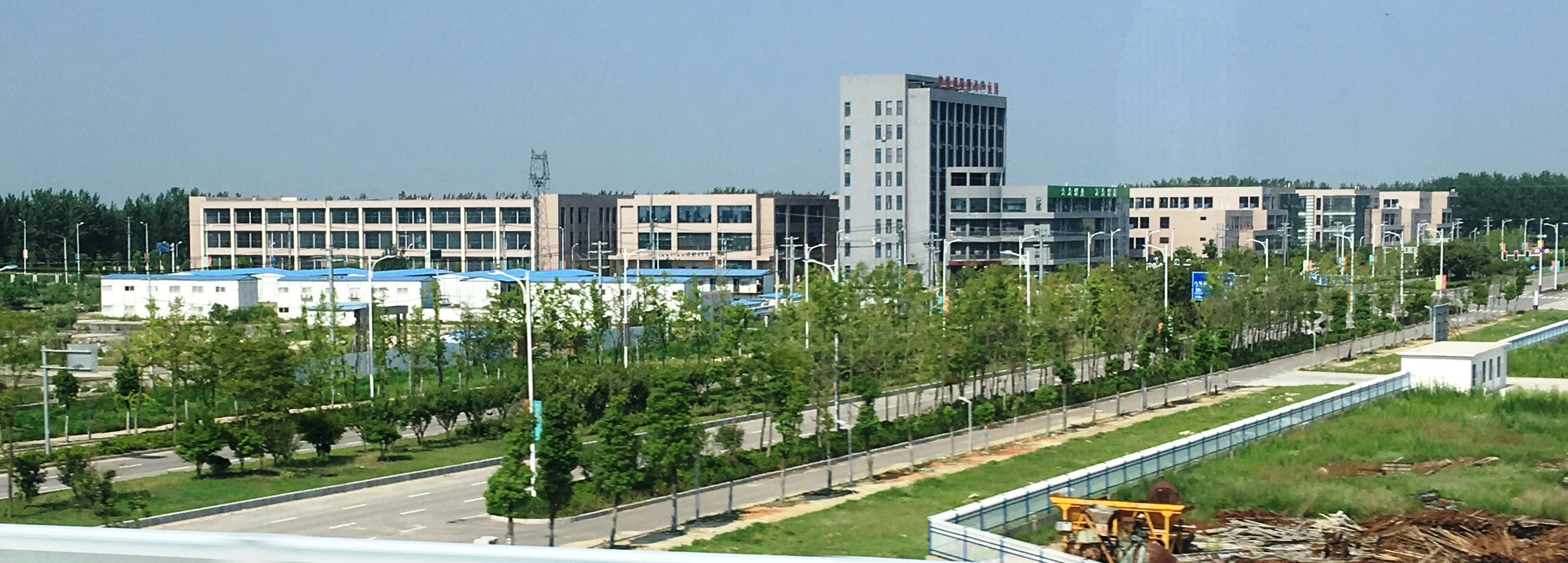
- Interactive map of Guzhen
- Country: China
- Province: Anhui
- Prefecture-level city: Bengbu
- County seat: Guyang

Area
  - Total: 1,363 km^{2} (526 sq mi)

Population (2020)
  - Total: 501,449
  - Density: 367.9/km^{2} (952.9/sq mi)
- Time zone: UTC+8 (China Standard)
- Postal code: 233700
- Division code: GZX
- Website: official website

Guzhen County (simplified Chinese: 固镇县; traditional Chinese: 固鎮縣; pinyin: Gùzhèn Xiàn) is a county in the north of Anhui Province, China. It is under the administration of Bengbu city.

== Administrative divisions ==
In the present, Guzhen County has 8 towns and 3 townships.

8 Towns

- Chengguan (城关镇)
- Haocheng (濠城镇)
- Liancheng (连城镇)
- Renqiao (任桥镇)
- Hugou (湖沟镇)
- Xinmaqiao (新马桥镇)
- Liuji (刘集镇)
- Wangzhuang (王庄镇)

3 Townships

- Shihu (石湖乡)
- Yangmiao (杨庙乡)
- Zhongxing (仲兴镇)

== Climate ==
Climate data for Guzhen, elevation 21 m (69 ft), (1991–2020 normals, extremes 1967–present)
| Month | Jan | Feb | Mar | Apr | May | Jun | Jul | Aug | Sep | Oct | Nov | Dec | Year |
|---|---|---|---|---|---|---|---|---|---|---|---|---|---|
| Record high °C (°F) | 19.3 (66.7) | 26.2 (79.2) | 33.6 (92.5) | 34.4 (93.9) | 37.6 (99.7) | 40.5 (104.9) | 40.5 (104.9) | 40.5 (104.9) | 37.2 (99.0) | 34.5 (94.1) | 29.2 (84.6) | 22.0 (71.6) | 40.5 (104.9) |
| Mean daily maximum °C (°F) | 6.3 (43.3) | 9.5 (49.1) | 14.9 (58.8) | 21.5 (70.7) | 26.8 (80.2) | 30.6 (87.1) | 32.1 (89.8) | 31.2 (88.2) | 27.6 (81.7) | 22.5 (72.5) | 15.4 (59.7) | 8.7 (47.7) | 20.6 (69.1) |
| Daily mean °C (°F) | 1.6 (34.9) | 4.4 (39.9) | 9.4 (48.9) | 15.9 (60.6) | 21.3 (70.3) | 25.5 (77.9) | 27.9 (82.2) | 26.9 (80.4) | 22.7 (72.9) | 17.1 (62.8) | 10.2 (50.4) | 3.7 (38.7) | 15.5 (60.0) |
| Mean daily minimum °C (°F) | −1.9 (28.6) | 0.5 (32.9) | 4.9 (40.8) | 10.8 (51.4) | 16.4 (61.5) | 21.0 (69.8) | 24.4 (75.9) | 23.6 (74.5) | 18.8 (65.8) | 12.8 (55.0) | 6.1 (43.0) | 0.0 (32.0) | 11.4 (52.6) |
| Record low °C (°F) | −14.3 (6.3) | −24.3 (−11.7) | −6.1 (21.0) | −0.1 (31.8) | 6.5 (43.7) | 11.9 (53.4) | 18.1 (64.6) | 14.3 (57.7) | 8.7 (47.7) | 0.0 (32.0) | −7.5 (18.5) | −18.9 (−2.0) | −24.3 (−11.7) |
| Average precipitation mm (inches) | 26.5 (1.04) | 31.3 (1.23) | 47.0 (1.85) | 51.9 (2.04) | 71.8 (2.83) | 146.5 (5.77) | 227.4 (8.95) | 162.7 (6.41) | 83.8 (3.30) | 49.7 (1.96) | 39.4 (1.55) | 21.3 (0.84) | 959.3 (37.77) |
| Average precipitation days (≥ 0.1 mm) | 5.7 | 7.0 | 7.4 | 7.1 | 8.0 | 8.5 | 12.8 | 11.6 | 8.5 | 6.5 | 6.8 | 5.1 | 95 |
| Average snowy days | 3.8 | 2.9 | 1.4 | 0 | 0 | 0 | 0 | 0 | 0 | 0 | 0.8 | 1.6 | 10.5 |
| Average relative humidity (%) | 68 | 67 | 66 | 66 | 67 | 69 | 79 | 81 | 76 | 69 | 69 | 68 | 70 |
| Mean monthly sunshine hours | 128.7 | 134.6 | 168.6 | 196.1 | 201.7 | 180.6 | 187.1 | 182.3 | 166.0 | 170.1 | 147.2 | 138.9 | 2,001.9 |
| Percentage possible sunshine | 41 | 43 | 45 | 50 | 47 | 42 | 43 | 44 | 45 | 49 | 47 | 45 | 45 |
Source: China Meteorological Administration all-time extremes

== History ==
- A 4500-year-old city in what is called as the Nanchengzi Ruins is found in this county.
- At the end of the Qin dynasty (202 BC), the battle of Chu and Han happened in Guzhen, leaving the "besieged on all sides", "Farewell My Concubine" and other stories.
- During the Taihe period, the Northern Wei dynasty established a town called Guyang, which then evolved into Guzhen County.
- On October 31, 1964, each part of Xuxian, Lingbi, Huaiyuan, Wuhe formed the Administrative Region Establishment of Guzhen County. On July 1, 1965, Guzhen county was under the administration of Xuxian area; 1983 is Bengbu City.

== Place of interest ==
- Gaixia ruins (the provincial cultural relics protection units)
- Yangcheng Valley site
- Ancient battlefield site
