= Taikang County =

Taikang 太康县
- County
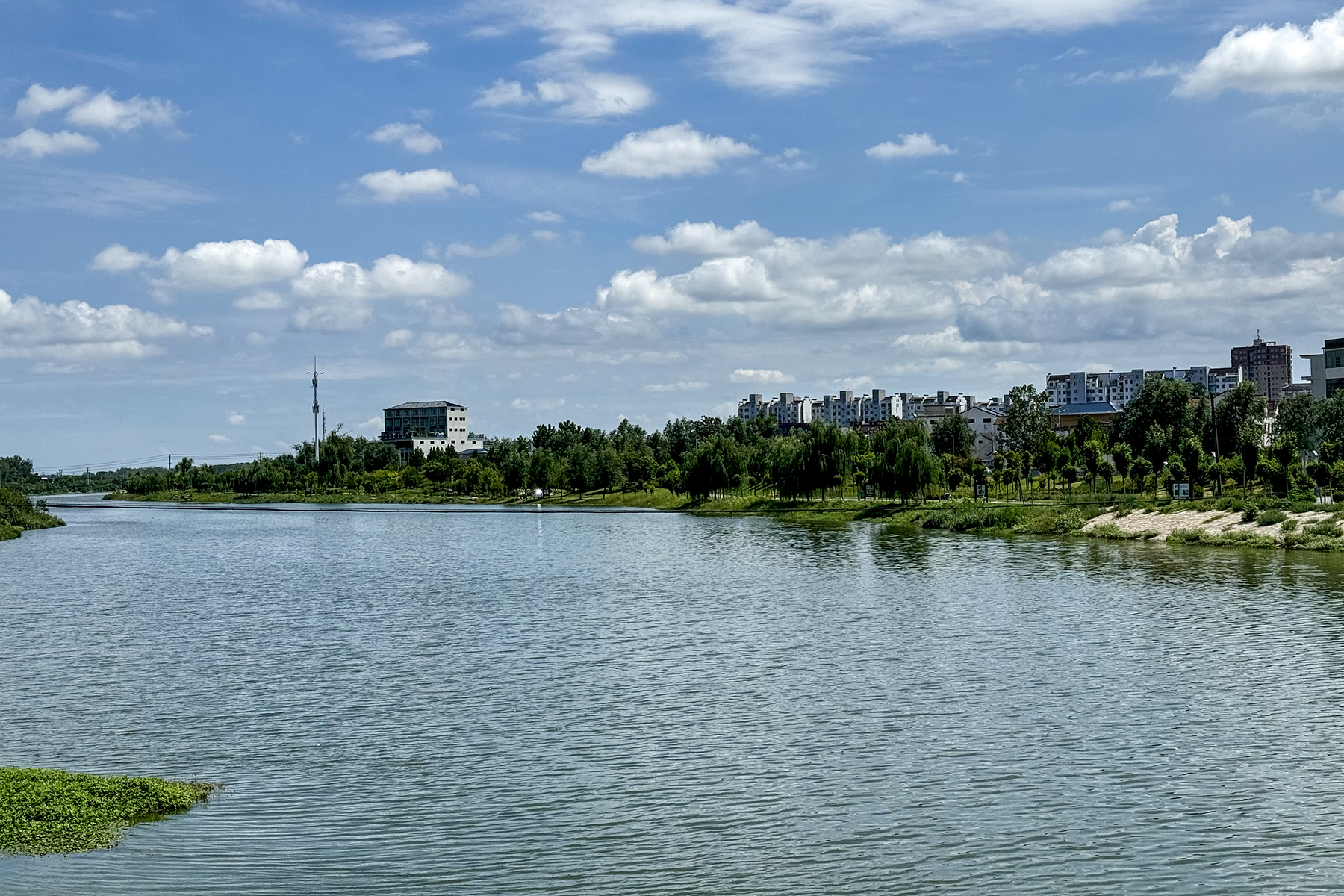
- The Guo River passing through Taikang

- Location of the seat in Henan
- Coordinates: 34°03′50″N 114°50′13″E
- Country: People's Republic of China
- Province: Henan
- Prefecture-level city: Zhoukou

Area
  - Total: 1,761 km^{2} (680 sq mi)

Population (2019)
  - Total: 1,032,100
  - Density: 586.1/km^{2} (1,518/sq mi)
- Time zone: UTC+8 (China Standard)
- Postal code: 461499
- Area code: 0394
- Website: www.taikang.gov.cn

Taikang County (Chinese: 太康县; pinyin: Tàikāng Xiàn), formerly known as Yangjia County or Yangxia County, is a county in the north of Zhoukou prefecture-level city, in the east of Henan province, China. It is divided into 23 townships and 766 villages. The county is home to 1.43 million Han Chinese and 25,000 Hui, with a population density of 581 people per kilometre squared.

== History ==
The administrative area of Taikang was originally known as "Yangxia County". As a major thoroughfare, the county has been historically important. It was the hometown of Wu Guang, one of the peasant leaders of the rebellion against the Qin dynasty. It was also the ancestral hometown of the Xie and Yuan surnames; it consequently was the birthplace of several famous Xie clan members such as Xie Daoyun, Xie Hui, Xie Lingyun, Xie Tiao, and others. Following the start of the chaotic Sixteen Kingdoms period, Yangxia County initially remained part of the areas held by the Eastern Jin, but was later conquered by the Former Qin. In course of the latter's decline, the county was occupied by the Northern Wei that held it until 446. It was then captured by the Liu Song dynasty, but reconquered by the Northern Wei in 488. Toward the end of the Northern and Southern dynasties period, Yangxia County fell to the Sui dynasty, which changed its name to "Taikang County" in 587. This name was derived from Xia dynasty king Tai Kang. The character "夏" is normally pronounced as xià but in Central Plains Mandarin is pronounced jiǎ.

In 884, the Tang army under Li Keyong defeated the rebel army of Shang Rang at Taikang.

By time of the Ming dynasty, Taikang had grown rich as trade center and market town, and was widely nicknamed "Silver Taikang". Due to this wealth, however, the town was repeatedly sacked in times of political unrest. It was plundered by the Shun rebel army of Li Zicheng in 1644 during the fall of the Ming dynasty. In course of the Nian Rebellion, Taikang was plundered by insurgents four times, namely in 1852, 1856, 1861, and 1863. After the Xinhai Revolution's outbreak, the Yellow Sand Society and the Cha Tianhua bandit group raided the town in 1911. In the following years, Taikang's economic importance declined due to the construction of railways in the region, but it was still the target of rampaging bandits and soldiers in the Warlord Era and Nanjing decade, with raids occurring in October 1923, December 1924, November 1925, January as well as June 1926, March 1927, March 1928, winter 1930, and January 1932.

Today, Taikang is a primarily agrarian county, with some light industry. The county is famous for its production of cotton.

== Administrative divisions ==
As of 2012, this county is divided to 11 towns and 12 townships.

Towns

- Chengguan (城关镇)
- Changying (常营镇)
- Sunmukou (逊母口镇)
- Laozhong (老冢镇)
- Zhukou (朱口镇)
- Matou (马头镇)
- Longqu (龙曲镇)
- Banqiao (板桥镇)
- Fucaolou (符草楼镇)
- Machang (马厂镇)
- Maozhuang (毛庄镇)

Townships

- Chengjiao Township (城郊乡)
- Yangmiao Township (杨庙乡)
- Wangji Township (王集乡)
- Gaoxian Township (高贤乡)
- Zhimawa Township (芝麻洼乡)
- Qingji Township (清集乡)
- Dutang Township (独塘乡)
- Daxuzhai Township (大许寨乡)
- Wulikou Township (五里口乡)
- Zhangji Township (张集乡)
- Gaolang Township (高朗乡)
- Zhuanlou Township (转楼乡)

== Climate ==
Climate data for Taikang, elevation 53 m (174 ft), (1991–2020 normals, extremes 1981–2010)
Month	Jan	Feb	Mar	Apr	May	Jun	Jul	Aug	Sep	Oct	Nov	Dec	Year
Record high °C (°F)	18.6 (65.5)	25.3 (77.5)	27.9 (82.2)	32.5 (90.5)	37.9 (100.2)	40.2 (104.4)	40.6 (105.1)	38.8 (101.8)	35.9 (96.6)	34.5 (94.1)	27.8 (82.0)	20.8 (69.4)	40.6 (105.1)
Mean daily maximum °C (°F)	5.9 (42.6)	9.8 (49.6)	15.3 (59.5)	21.6 (70.9)	27.0 (80.6)	31.8 (89.2)	32.3 (90.1)	30.8 (87.4)	27.2 (81.0)	22.2 (72.0)	14.5 (58.1)	7.9 (46.2)	20.5 (68.9)
Daily mean °C (°F)	0.9 (33.6)	4.3 (39.7)	9.7 (49.5)	15.8 (60.4)	21.2 (70.2)	25.9 (78.6)	27.5 (81.5)	26.1 (79.0)	21.6 (70.9)	16.1 (61.0)	9.0 (48.2)	2.9 (37.2)	15.1 (59.2)
Mean daily minimum °C (°F)	−2.8 (27.0)	0.2 (32.4)	5.0 (41.0)	10.6 (51.1)	16.1 (61.0)	21.0 (69.8)	23.8 (74.8)	22.6 (72.7)	17.5 (63.5)	11.6 (52.9)	4.8 (40.6)	−0.8 (30.6)	10.8 (51.5)
Record low °C (°F)	−15.7 (3.7)	−13.4 (7.9)	−9.9 (14.2)	−2.4 (27.7)	3.6 (38.5)	11.6 (52.9)	16.4 (61.5)	12.6 (54.7)	6.4 (43.5)	−0.3 (31.5)	−15.3 (4.5)	−15.1 (4.8)	−15.7 (3.7)
Average precipitation mm (inches)	15.0 (0.59)	18.2 (0.72)	32.3 (1.27)	41.4 (1.63)	66.6 (2.62)	100.3 (3.95)	211.8 (8.34)	145.1 (5.71)	79.4 (3.13)	45.6 (1.80)	35.8 (1.41)	14.2 (0.56)	805.7 (31.73)
Average precipitation days (≥ 0.1 mm)	4.4	4.8	5.8	5.9	7.7	7.9	11.3	10.8	8.1	6.4	6.0	4.2	83.3
Average snowy days	3.8	2.8	1.1	0.1	0	0	0	0	0	0	0.9	2.3	11
Average relative humidity (%)	67	64	63	67	69	67	80	83	79	71	71	68	71
Mean monthly sunshine hours	114.8	123.7	163.3	188.6	200.6	182.0	173.4	164.1	150.2	144.8	127.5	119.4	1,852.4
Percentage possible sunshine	36	40	44	48	46	42	40	40	41	42	41	39	42
Source: China Meteorological Administration

== Notable people ==
- Xie Daoyun, renown Eastern Jin poet
- Xie Fei (441–507), high-ranking official who served under the Liu Song dynasty, Southern Qi, and Liang dynasty
- Xie Hongwei (392–433), high-ranking official under the Liu Song dynasty
- Xie Hui, high-ranking official and regent under the Liu Song dynasty
- Xie Lingyun, important Six Dynasties poet
- Xie Shang (308–337), high-ranking official under the Eastern Jin dynasty
- Xie Tiao, major Yongming poet
- Xie Zhuang (421–466), high-ranking official under the Liu Song dynasty

== Bibliography ==
- Billingsley, Phil (1988). Bandits in Republican China. Stanford, California: Stanford University Press.
- Ouyang, Xiu (2004). Richard L. Davis (ed.). Historical Records of the Five Dynasties. New York City: Columbia University Press.
- Xiong, Victor Cunrui (2017). Historical Dictionary of Medieval China (2nd ed.). Lanham, Maryland; New York City; London: Rowman & Littlefield.
