= Yangmiao Township, Anhui =

Yangmiao Township 杨庙乡
- Township
- Location in China
- Coordinates: 33°18′20″N 117°14′11″E
- Country: People's Republic of China
- Province: Anhui
- Prefecture-level city: Bengbu
- County: Guzhen County
- Time zone: UTC+8 (China Standard)

Yangmiao Township (simplified Chinese: 杨庙乡; traditional Chinese: 楊廟鄉; pinyin: Yángmiào Xiāng) is a township in Guzhen County, Anhui, China. As of 2020, it administers the following four residential neighborhoods and 22 villages:

Neighborhoods

- Yangmiao
- Heji (何集)
- Caoxu (曹徐)
- Jiangnan (蒋南)

Villages

- Anji Village (安集村)
- Anwei Village (安圩村)
- Renhu Village (任湖村)
- Mendongwang Village (门东王村)
- Zhaohu Village (赵湖村)
- Tianhu Village (田湖村)
- Liuwei Village (刘魏湖村)
- Yaowang Village (姚王村)
- Zhangzhuang Village (张庄村)
- Mengmiao Village (孟庙村)
- Sangyuan Village (桑元村)
- Beiwei Village (北圩村)
- Zhangxiang Village (张巷村)
- Lujing Village (陆郢村)
- Sunqian Village (孙浅村)
- Qiaodian Village (乔店村)
- Yanwan Village (严湾村)
- Xienan Village (澥南村)
- Qiaowei Village (乔圩村)
- Songnan Village (松南村)
- Loushang Village (楼上村)
- Miaoxin Village (庙新村)
