= Yangmiao Township, Henan =

Yangmiao Township 杨庙乡
- Township
- Location in Henan
- Coordinates: 34°10′12″N 114°54′15″E
- Country: People's Republic of China
- Province: Henan
- Prefecture-level city: Zhoukou
- County: Taikang County
- Time zone: UTC+8 (China Standard)

Yangmiao Township (simplified Chinese: 杨庙乡; traditional Chinese: 楊廟鄉; pinyin: Yángmiào Xiāng) is a township in Taikang County, Henan, China. As of 2020, it administers the following thirty villages:

- Xijie Village (西街村)
- Konglou Village (孔楼村)
- Lüzhuang Village (吕庄村)
- Gezhuang Village (葛庄村)
- Xizhang Village (西张村)
- Nanjie Village (南街村)
- Qilou Village (祁楼村)
- Hanzhuang Village (韩庄村)
- Caozhuang Village (曹庄村)
- Dawangzhuang Village (大王庄村)
- Mazhuang Village (马庄村)
- Panglou Village (庞楼村)
- Chenzhuang Village (陈庄村)
- Houdian Village (后店村)
- Dongjie Village (东街村)
- Chenliuzhang Village (陈六张村)
- Junying Village (军营村)
- Gengzhuang Village (耿庄村)
- Xiaoqi Village (小祁村)
- Beijie Village (北街村)
- Wangwan Village (王湾村)
- Qianjie Village (前街村)
- Hongmiao Village (洪庙村)
- Niuwangzhuang Village (牛王庄村)
- Houjie Village (后街村)
- Tiefosi Village (铁佛寺村)
- Gezhenyuan Village (格针园村)
- Lidazhuang Village (李大庄村)
- Liuzhuang Village (柳庄村)
- Xiaohe Village (小河村)
