= Yangmiao, Changfeng County =

Yangmiao 杨庙镇
- Town
- Location in China
- Coordinates: 32°12′1″N 117°4′53″E
- Country: People's Republic of China
- Province: Anhui
- Prefecture-level city: Hefei
- County: Changfeng County
- Time zone: UTC+8 (China Standard)

Yangmiao (simplified Chinese: 杨庙; traditional Chinese: 楊廟; pinyin: Yángmiào) is a town in Changfeng County, Anhui, China. As of 2020, it administers the following five residential communities and twelve villages:

- Miaobei Community (庙北社区)
- Miaonan Community (庙南社区)
- Sishu Community (四树社区)
- Maying Community (马郢社区)
- Shijing Community (十井社区)
- Konggang Village (孔岗村)
- Dacheng Village (大程村)
- Shuangtang Village (双塘村)
- Yangang Village (颜岗村)
- Dalu Village (大路村)
- Dayuan Village (大元村)
- Zaolinpu Village (枣林铺村)
- Taodian Village (陶店村)
- Zhipu Village (豸铺村)
- Yunfeng Village (云峰村)
- Songlou Village (宋楼村)
- Gudaying Village (谷大郢村)
