= Yongming poetry =

Poetry originating in fifth century China

Yongming poetry refers to a poetry style of the Chinese Southern Qi dynasty in the 5th century AD. Yongming (Chinese: 永明; pinyin: Yǒngmíng; Wade–Giles: Yung-ming; lit. 'Forever Bright') was an era name of the Emperor Wu of Southern Qi. The Yongming period was from 483 to 493. However brief this era, it is now associated with a major movement within Classical Chinese poetry.

== Background ==
Despite the disturbances and instability which preceded and followed the Yongming era, there was also something special about it. In his Zizhi Tongjian, Song dynasty historian Sima Guang characterized the Emperor Wu and his Yongming era, saying that:

during his era of Yongming, the people were rich and peaceful, and there was little crime. However, he also favored feasting and gaming, and while he expressed displeasure at luxuries and wastefulness, he could not avoid them himself.

This was also an era that came to be associated with significant poetic achievements.

== Poets ==
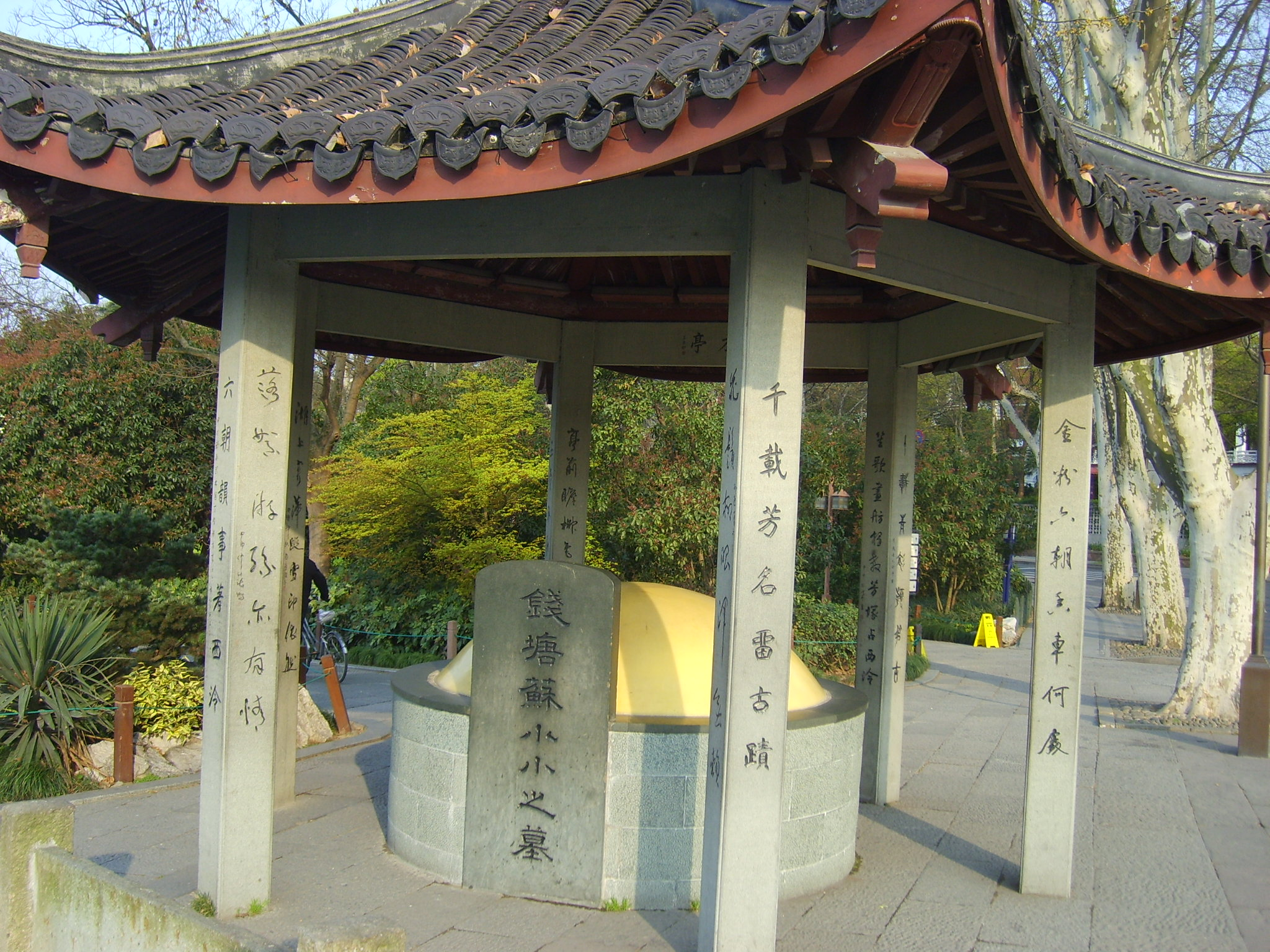
Rebuilt tomb of Su Xiaoxiao.

- Shen Yue (441–513) was the most important of poet of the Yongming era, developing rules of tonal euphony (four tones) that would eventually evolve into the regulated verse format of "recent style" poetry.
- Xie Tiao (464–499) was another well-known poet of the Yongming, known for his vivid descriptions of landscapes.
- Wang Rong (468 - 494) was a less well-known, but still prominent, Yongming poet. He became quite involved in political affairs. Eventually this involvement resulted in his early death.
- Fan Yun (451 - 503) was another of the Yongming poets. A poet at young age, he had a quick wit and learned to write poems at the age of eight. He was a personal friend of Emperor Wu, and was politically powerful.
- Su Xiaoxiao (蘇小小, died c. 501, also known as Su Xiaojun, or "Little Su") was in her brief life a famous Gējì and a poet from the city of Qiantang (now Hangzhou, in modern Zhejiang province, China).

== Influence ==
The life and poetry of Su Xiaoxiao was a source of inspiration for later poets and artists including Tang dynasty poets Bai Juyi, Li He, Wen Tingyun, and the Ming dynasty writer and poet Zhang Dai.

== See also ==
- Classical Chinese poetry
- Six Dynasties poetry
- West Lake
- Zhang Rong
