= Changfeng County =

Changfeng 长丰县
- County
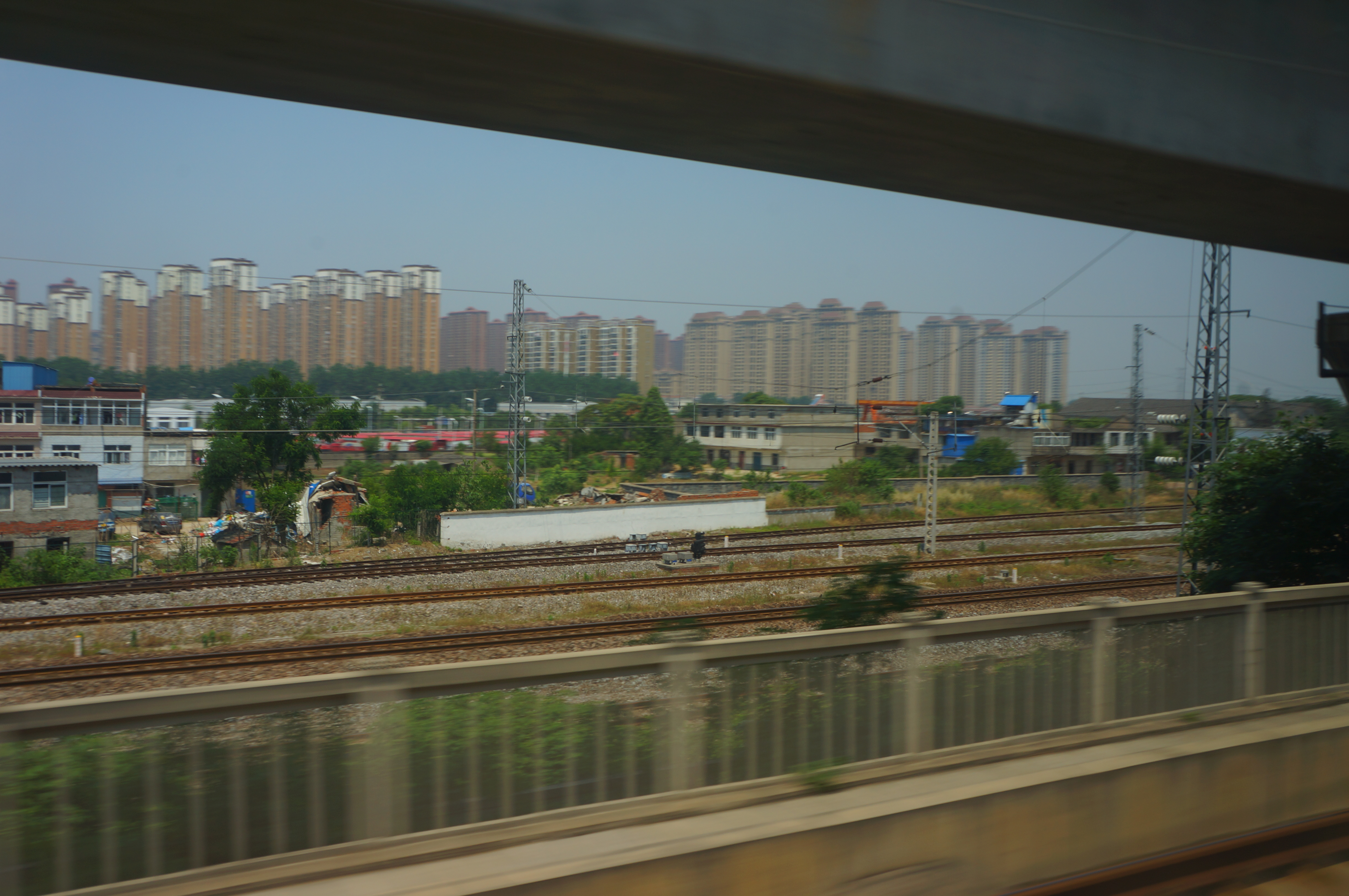
- View of Shuangdunji in Changfeng from the Hefei–Bengbu high-speed railway

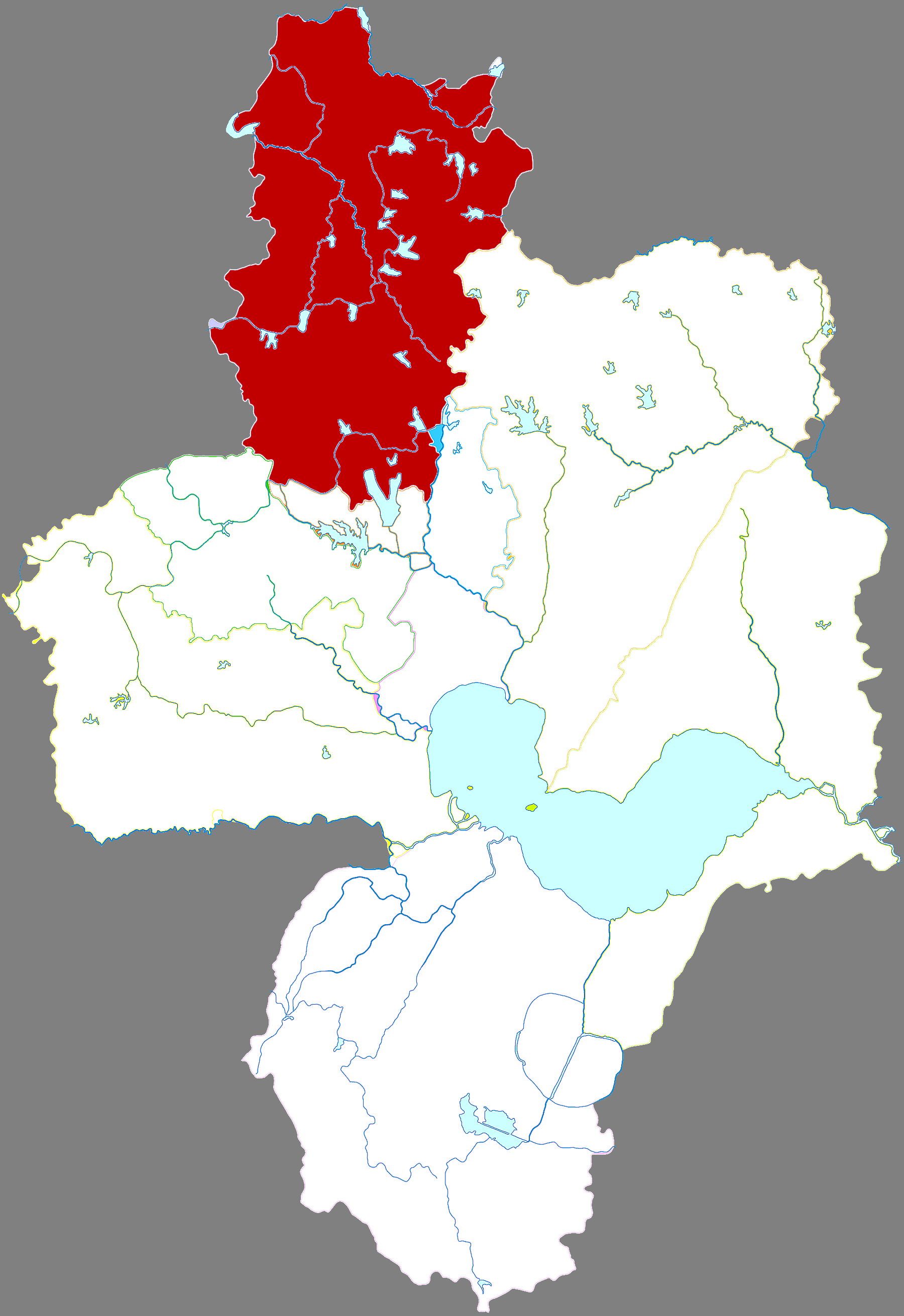
- Changfeng in Hefei

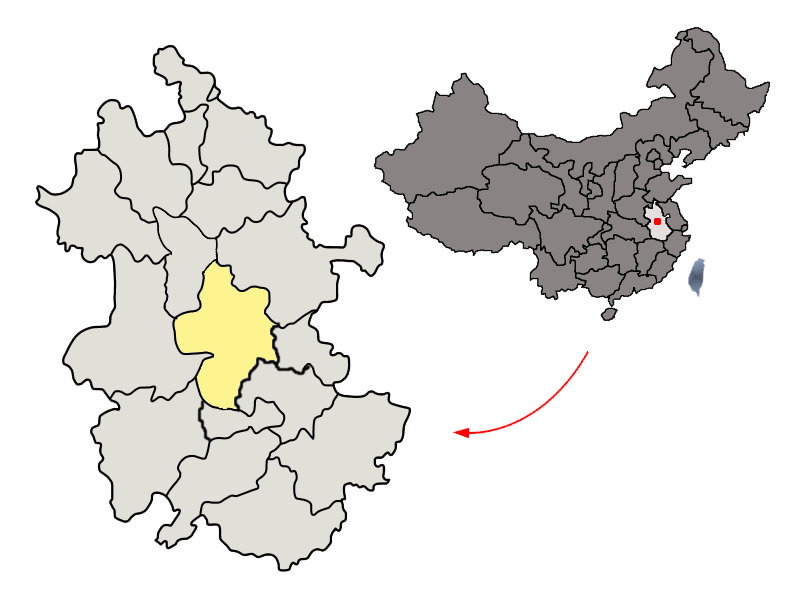
- Hefei in Anhui
- Coordinates: 32°28′41″N 117°10′03″E
- Country: China
- Province: Anhui
- Prefecture-level city: Hefei
- County seat: Shuihu

Area
  - Total: 1,922.24 km^{2} (742.18 sq mi)

Population (2020)
  - Total: 783,982
  - Density: 407.848/km^{2} (1,056.32/sq mi)
- Time zone: UTC+8 (China Standard)
- Postal code: 231100
- Website: www.changfeng.gov.cn

Changfeng County (simplified Chinese: 长丰县; traditional Chinese: 長豐縣; pinyin: Chángfēng Xiàn) is a county of Anhui Province, East China, under the administration of the prefecture-level city of Hefei, the capital of Anhui, and is also its northernmost county-level division. The county has a surface of 1,922.24 km^{2} (742.18 sq mi) and a population of 629,535 inhabitants. It contains 9 towns, 6 townships, and a development zone.

In 2014 Changfeng County offered 1,000 RMB in cash ($140) to each family who gave newborns the mothers' surname, in order improve the imbalanced sex ratio.

== Administrative divisions ==
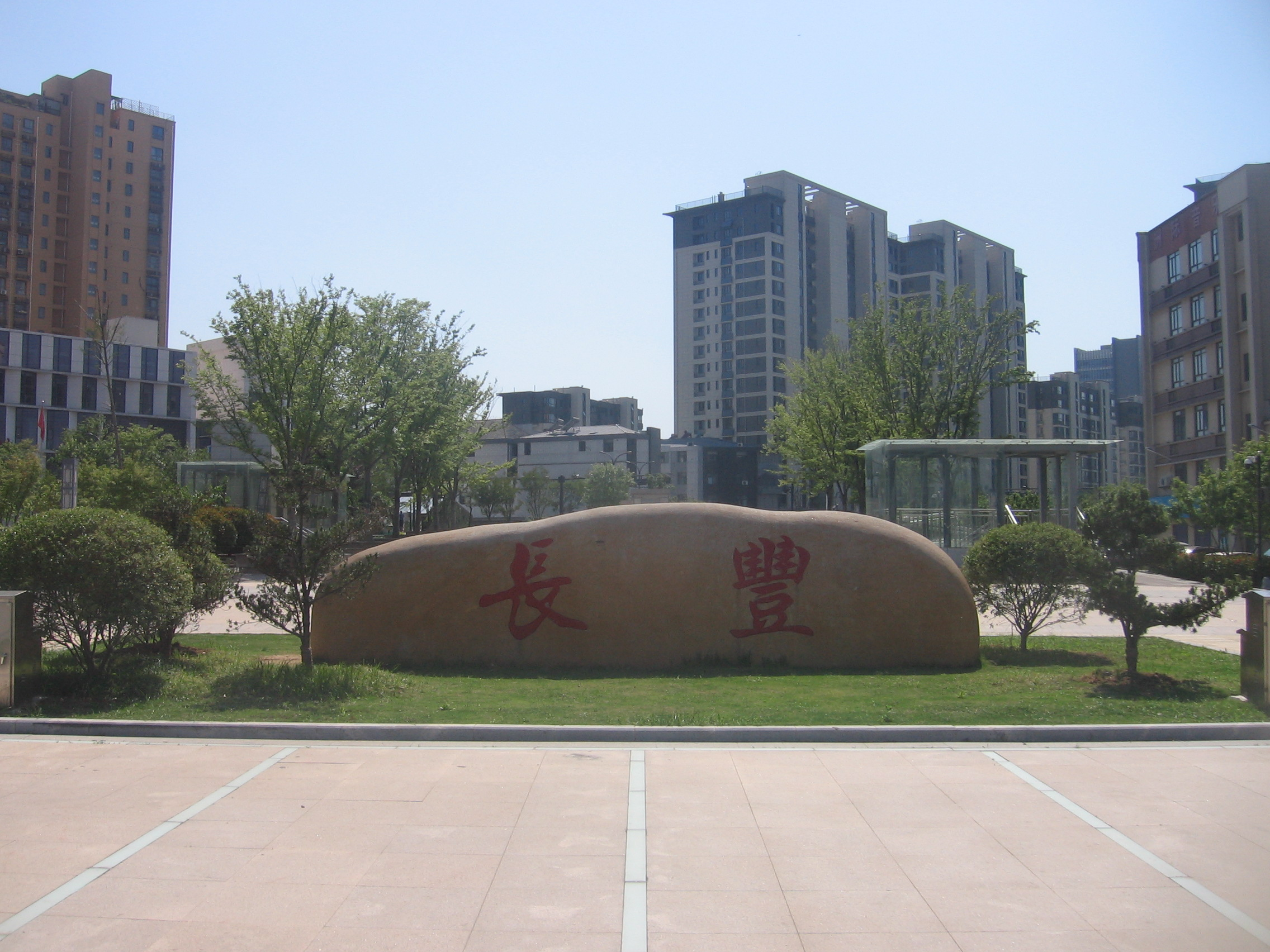
Square in front of Shuijiahu railway station in Shuihu Town, Changfeng County

Changfeng County is divided to 12 towns, 2 townships and 1 other.

Towns

- Shuihu (水湖镇)
- Zhuangmu (庄墓镇)
- Yangmiao (杨庙镇)
- Wushan (吴山镇)
- Gangji (岗集镇)
- Shuangdun (双墩镇)
- Xiatang (下塘镇)
- Zhuxiang (朱巷镇)
- Taolou (陶楼镇)
- Duji (杜集镇)
- Luotang (罗塘镇)
- Yijing (义井镇)

Townships

- Zuodian Township (左店乡)
- Zaojia Township (造甲乡)

Other

- Shuangfeng Development Zone (双凤开发区)

== Climate ==
Climate data for Changfeng, elevation 45 m (148 ft), (1991–2020 normals, extremes 1981–present)
Month	Jan	Feb	Mar	Apr	May	Jun	Jul	Aug	Sep	Oct	Nov	Dec	Year
Record high °C (°F)	19.4 (66.9)	26.7 (80.1)	33.5 (92.3)	34.1 (93.4)	36.4 (97.5)	39.0 (102.2)	38.8 (101.8)	39.0 (102.2)	38.1 (100.6)	34.5 (94.1)	29.4 (84.9)	23.1 (73.6)	39.0 (102.2)
Mean daily maximum °C (°F)	6.9 (44.4)	10.0 (50.0)	15.3 (59.5)	21.9 (71.4)	27.1 (80.8)	30.1 (86.2)	32.4 (90.3)	31.6 (88.9)	27.8 (82.0)	22.8 (73.0)	16.1 (61.0)	9.4 (48.9)	21.0 (69.7)
Daily mean °C (°F)	2.3 (36.1)	5.1 (41.2)	10.0 (50.0)	16.3 (61.3)	21.7 (71.1)	25.5 (77.9)	28.2 (82.8)	27.4 (81.3)	23.1 (73.6)	17.4 (63.3)	10.7 (51.3)	4.5 (40.1)	16.0 (60.8)
Mean daily minimum °C (°F)	−0.9 (30.4)	1.4 (34.5)	5.7 (42.3)	11.5 (52.7)	17.0 (62.6)	21.6 (70.9)	24.9 (76.8)	24.2 (75.6)	19.5 (67.1)	13.3 (55.9)	6.5 (43.7)	0.9 (33.6)	12.1 (53.8)
Record low °C (°F)	−13.8 (7.2)	−12.6 (9.3)	−4.7 (23.5)	0.1 (32.2)	6.4 (43.5)	12.1 (53.8)	18.0 (64.4)	15.4 (59.7)	9.6 (49.3)	−0.2 (31.6)	−5.8 (21.6)	−18.5 (−1.3)	−18.5 (−1.3)
Average precipitation mm (inches)	36.3 (1.43)	41.3 (1.63)	65.0 (2.56)	65.9 (2.59)	81.1 (3.19)	149.6 (5.89)	175.0 (6.89)	138.8 (5.46)	73.6 (2.90)	51.1 (2.01)	48.0 (1.89)	26.4 (1.04)	952.1 (37.48)
Average precipitation days (≥ 0.1 mm)	7.5	8.1	9.2	8.4	9.2	9.4	11.4	11.6	8.6	7.5	7.9	6.4	105.2
Average snowy days	4.2	2.3	1.1	0	0	0	0	0	0	0	0.6	1.3	9.5
Average relative humidity (%)	74	73	71	70	70	75	81	81	78	72	73	73	74
Mean monthly sunshine hours	134.9	131.3	166.9	191.9	201.5	181.3	203.0	197.4	169.8	171.0	155.9	144.3	2,049.2
Percentage possible sunshine	42	42	45	49	47	43	47	48	46	49	50	47	46
Source: China Meteorological Administration
