= Shatoujiao station =

Metro station in Shenzhen, Guangdong, China

Shatoujiao 沙头角
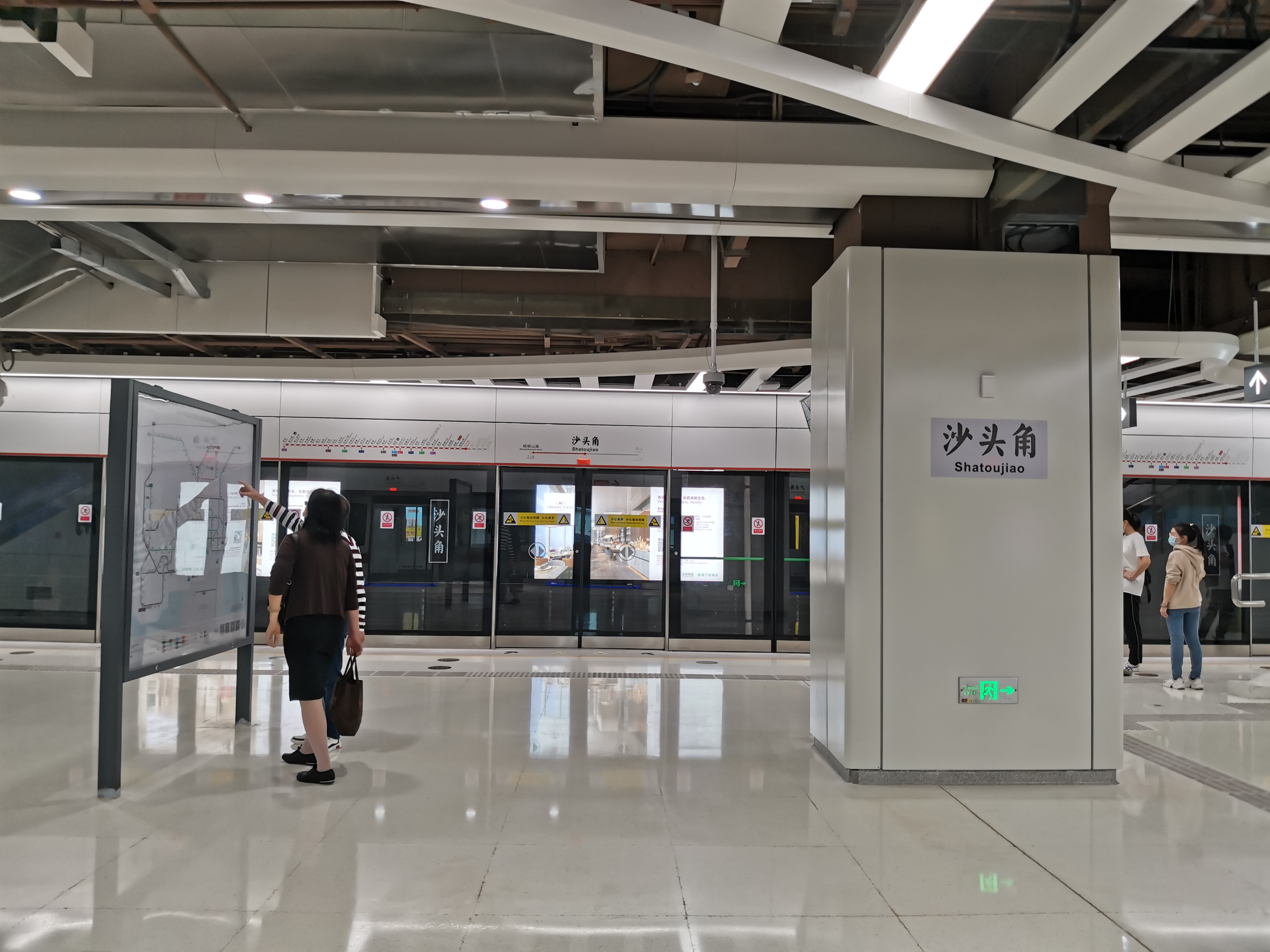
- Platform

Chinese name
- Simplified Chinese: 沙头角站
- Traditional Chinese: 沙頭角站
Transcriptions
Standard Mandarin
- Hanyu Pinyin: Shātóujiǎo Zhàn
Yue: Cantonese
- Jyutping: saa1 tau4 gok3 zaam6

General information
- Location: Shenyan Road (深盐路) × Shashen Road (沙深路) / Yuanlin Road (园林路); Shatoujiao Subdistrict, Yantian District, Shenzhen, Guangdong; China
- Coordinates: 22°33′25.9″N 114°13′4.9″E
- Operator: Shenzhen Metro Group
- Line: Line 8
- Platforms: 2 (1 island platform)
- Tracks: 2

Construction
- Structure type: Underground
- Accessible: Yes

History
- Opened: 28 October 2020

Services
Preceding station	Shenzhen Metro	Following station
Wutong Mountain South towards Liantang (Line 2: Chiwan)	Line 8	Haishan towards Xichong
Location

Shatoujiao (Chinese: 沙头角) is a station on Line 8 of the Shenzhen Metro. It opened on 28 October 2020.

== Station layout ==
G	Street level	Exit
B1F; Concourse	Lobby	Customer Service, Shops, Vending machines, ATMs
B2F; Platforms	Platform	← Line 8 towards Chiwan (Wutong Mountain South)
B2F; Platforms	Island platform, doors will open on the left
B2F; Platforms	Platform	Line 8 towards Xichong (Haishan) →

== Entrances/exits ==
- A1: South side of Shenyan Rd (W), west side of Shashen Rd, Yantian District Welfare Center, Nursing Home in Yantian District
- A2: North side of Shenyan Rd (W), Shatoujiao Community Neighborhood Committee, Shatoujiao Community Health
- B: South side of Shenyan Rd (E), North side of Shashen Rd, Administrative Service Hall of Shatoujiao Sub-District Office, Shatoujiao Police Station, Tianxin Community Neighborhood Committee, Shatoujiao Customs, Zhongying Street, Shatoujiao Sub-District Cultural Station, Lan Jun Gong Guan, Yantian International Creative Port
- C: North side of Shenyan Rd (E), west side of Yuanlin Rd
