= Haishan station =

Haishan station can refer to:

- Haishan metro station, a metro station in Taipei, Taiwan
- Haishan station (Shenzhen Metro), a metro station in Shenzhen, China
