= Horizontal Skyscraper – Vanke Center =

Building in Guangdong, China

Horizontal Skyscraper - Vanke Center
- Interactive map of the Horizontal Skyscraper - Vanke Center area

General information
- Location: Shenzhen, China
- Coordinates: 22.6005°N 114.2991°E
- Construction started: 2006
- Completed: 2009
- Opening: 2009

Technical details
- Floor area: 1,296,459 sq ft

Design and construction
- Architect: Steven Holl Architects

Vanke Center
- Simplified Chinese: 万科中心
- Traditional Chinese: 萬科中心
Transcriptions
Standard Mandarin
- Hanyu Pinyin: Wànkē Zhōngxīn
Yue: Cantonese
- Jyutping: maan6 fo1 zung1 sam1

The Horizontal Skyscraper, designed by Steven Holl Architects and completed in 2009, is a mixed-use building located on the outskirts of Shenzhen, China. Situated in Dameisha, Yantian District, the complex includes offices for Vanke Co., a conference center, restaurant, an auditorium, a hotel, apartments and a large public park.

By raising the 1,296,459-square-foot (120,445.0 m^{2}) building on eight cores — as far as 50 meters (160 ft) apart and positioning the building right under the 35-meter (115 ft) high limit of the area — Steven Holl Architects was able to create the largest possible tropical garden on the ground level of the site. In addition, the raised building allows for sea breezes to flow through the public gardens, reducing the temperature.

Covering the entire length of the building, a public path connects from the hotel, through the apartment zones and to the office wings.

The building is LEED Platinum, and features an innovative merging of cable stay bridge technology and a high strength concrete frame.

The Horizontal Skyscraper has been honored with several awards, including an AIA NY Architecture Honor Award, a Green Good Design Award, and was named Best Green Project in the Good Design is Good Business Awards.

In 2012, Steven Holl published "Horizontal Skyscraper," a book that follows the project from its beginning in 2006 through construction and to the opening of the building in 2009. The book was published by William Stout Publishers.

Holl received the commission through an architectural competition. He attributes his victory to maximizing the public landscape while rising to the 35 meter height limit and fully utilizing sea views from the built spaces.

== Sustainability ==
The building is sited on reclaimed/stabilized land that forms part of the municipal storm water management system. The lagoon functions as bio-swale/retention pond connected to several adjacent creaks. Part of the landscape architecture water edge proposal designed by Steven Holl Architects is the redesign the municipal hardscape bulkhead into a soft-edge planted estuary. As a restorative ecology, the Vanke Center landscape works to maintain native ecosystems minimize run-off, erosion and environmental damage associated with conventional modes of development. The project is both a building and a landscape, an intertwining of sophisticated engineering and the natural environment. By raising the building off of the ground plane, an open, publicly accessible park creates new social space in an otherwise closed and privatized community. The site area is approximately 60000 square meters, of which 45000 square meters are planted. With the addition of the planted roof area of the main building (approximately 15000 square meters) - the total planted area of the project is roughly equal to the site before development.

A large portion of the ground plane forms the roof on top of the program spaces above and below grade. In order for these landscaped roof areas to absorb large quantities of rainfall in the same way that natural soil would;sunken gardens, courtyards, ponds and planted mounds create a circulatory system to regulate and redistribute storm water throughout the site. In addition to the planted areas, several types of permeable pavement; local river stones, crushed gravels, open joint stone pavers, grasscrete and compressed sand pavers are being used. These will retain a lot of rainfall before secondary gutters redirect overflow into a series of ponds and wetlands that are planted with marsh grasses and lotus. These systems function collectively as a bio-swale that filters, aerates and irrigates the landscape. No potable or municipal water will be used for maintenance or irrigation.

To conserve potable water use; low-flow, high efficiency plumbing fixtures have been specified throughout the project. Greywater is recycled through dual-flush toilets. Waterless urinals have also been specified.

Each face of the 26 faces of the building has been calculated based on solar heat gain throughout the year and its louvers are fine-tuned to the orientation of the sun. Some louvers are fixed horizontally, some have apertures of differing size, and some are dynamically controlled by sensors, opening and closing according to the sun. The full height glass curtain wall brings daylight deep into all interiors spaces, and the latest high-performance glass coatings (double silver Low-E) are used throughout the project. These coatings have several advantages over conventional coatings because they have higher visible light transmittance which ensures better natural lighting and extremely low solar heat transmittance. This saves energy by reducing cooling loads. Ninety percent of interior spaces have direct views to the exterior.

In addition to the high-performance coatings, a secondary layer of perforated aluminum louvers is hung from the glass to create a double skinned façade. The interstitial cavity created by these two layers creates a convective stack-effect, drawing cool air in through the underside of the building and hot air out at the top of the structure near the roof. The perforated louvers provide extensive primary sun protection in closed condition. They reduce up to 70% of solar heat gain at its peak load, yet still provide 15% of light transmittance through the perforations. Given the intensity of the tropical sunlight, field measurements have calculated that this 15% light transmittance in closed mode is sufficient natural lighting to perform routine office functions without the need for secondary artificial lighting in most (75%) of spaces.

In the office portion of the project the operation of the exterior louvers, interior shades, air conditioning and lighting systems are coordinated by a series of interior and exterior sensors which balance ambient light levels, solar heat gain and ambient temperatures for maximum energy efficiency. There are individual controls for lighting and shade operation in most offices. Individual task/spot lights are provided for off hour, additional use.

From November to March the outdoor conditions in Shenzhen are calm and window ventilation can take over the role of the mechanical ventilation in most of the building (and in the condominium part completely). It is estimated that during this season mechanical ventilation systems can be switched off for at least 60% of the time. This will reduce electric energy consumption annually by 5 kWh per square meter.

In addition to natural ventilation, filtered outside air (MERV-13) is added to all the mechanical systems prior to conditioning and interior-CO_{2} levels are constantly monitored to control the fresh air exchange rate. A heat recovery unit exchanges the conditioned exhausted air temperature with the incoming fresh air, and prevents any cooling energy from being lost.

1400 square meters of photovoltaic panels installed on the roof of the building provide 12.5% of the total electric energy demand for Vanke Headquarters.
