= Yantian Port West station =

Metro station in Shenzhen, Guangdong, China

Yantian Port West 盐田港西
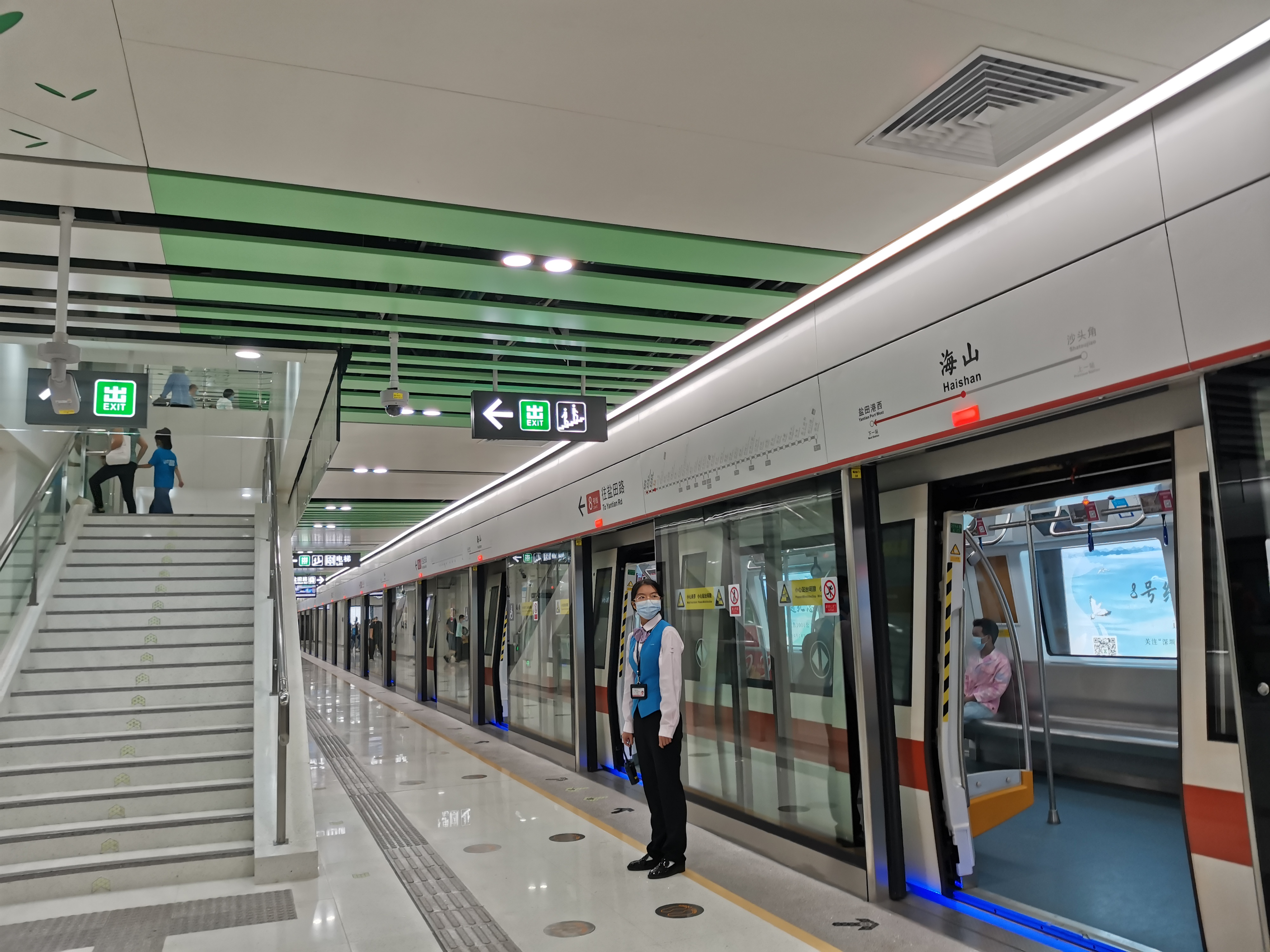
- Platform

Chinese name
- Simplified Chinese: 盐田港西站
- Traditional Chinese: 鹽田港西
Transcriptions
Standard Mandarin
- Hanyu Pinyin: Yántiángǎng Xī Zhàn

General information
- Location: Shenyan Road (深盐路) × Xiawutong Road (下梧桐路) / Haijing 2nd Road (海景二路) & Wutong Road (梧桐路); Haishan Subdistrict, Yantian District, Shenzhen, Guangdong; China
- Coordinates: 22°33′53.4″N 114°14′29.8″E
- Operator: Shenzhen Metro Group
- Line: Line 8
- Platforms: 2 (1 island platform)
- Tracks: 2

Construction
- Structure type: Underground
- Accessible: Yes

History
- Opened: 28 October 2020

Services
Preceding station	Shenzhen Metro	Following station
Haishan towards Liantang (Line 2: Chiwan)	Line 8	Shenwai Senior Campus towards Xichong
Location

Yantian Port West (Chinese: 盐田港西) is a station on Line 8 of the Shenzhen Metro. It opened on 28 October 2020.

== Station layout ==
G	Street level	Exit
B1F; Concourse	Lobby	Customer Service, Shops, Vending machines, ATMs
B2F; Platforms	Platform	← Line 2 towards Chiwan (Haishan)
B2F; Platforms	Island platform, doors will open on the left
B2F; Platforms	Platform	Line 8 towards Xichong (Shenwai Senior Campus) →

== Entrances/exits ==
- A1: South side of Shenyan Rd (W), Shatoujiao Area of Shenzhen Yantian Comprehensive Bonded Area, Haishan Sub-District Free Trade Zone Cultural Activity Center
- A2: South side of Shenyan Rd (E), Shenzhen Yantian Mother of God Church
- B1 & B2: Yantian Municipal Maritime Bureau, East side of Haijing 2nd Road (S), Xiehe Rd
- C: North side of Shenyan Road (W), Yantian Police Sub-bureau, Shenzhen, CPC Yantian District Comittee Party School, Shenzhen, Shatoujiao Campus of Shenzhen Radio and Television University
