= Vanke =

Large residential real estate developer in the People's Republic of China

Vanke Co., Ltd. 万科企业股份有限公司
- Type: Public company
- Traded as: SZSE: 000002; SEHK: 2202; CSI A50
- Industry: Real estate
- Founded: 1984
- Founder: Wang Shi
- Headquarters: Dameisha, Yantian District, Shenzhen, Guangdong, China
- Key people: Chairman: Yu Liang; CEO: Yu Liang
- Revenue: US$ 65.79 billion (2023)
- Net income: US$ 1.7 billion (2023)
- Total assets: US$ 212.0 billion (2023)
- Owner: Shenzhen Metro (29.38%)
- Number of employees: 131,097 (2023)
- Website: vanke.com

Vanke Co., Ltd.
- Simplified Chinese: 万科企业股份有限公司
- Traditional Chinese: 萬科企業股份有限公司
Transcriptions
Standard Mandarin
- Hanyu Pinyin: Wànkē Qǐyè Gǔfènyǒuxiàngōngsī
Yue: Cantonese
- Jyutping: maan6 fo1 kei5 jip6 gu2 fan6*2 jau5 haan6 gung1 si1

Vanke (simplified Chinese: 万科; traditional Chinese: 萬科; pinyin: Wànkē; Jyutping: maan6 fo1) is a large residential real estate developer in China. It is engaged in developing, managing and selling properties across more than 60 mainland Chinese cities in the Pearl River Delta, Yangtze River Delta and Bohai-Rim Region, with the provision of investment, trading, consultancy services and e-business. It also has expanded into Hong Kong, the United States, the United Kingdom, and Malaysia since 2012. Its largest shareholder is Shenzhen Metro.

It is headquartered in Vanke Center in Dameisha, Yantian District, Shenzhen, Guangdong province.

== History ==
Vanke was founded by Wang Shi in 1988. Vanke was listed on the Shenzhen Stock Exchange in 1991, the second listed company in the Shenzhen Stock Exchange after Shenzhen Development Bank. It had the largest market capitalisation in 2006 on the Shenzhen Stock Exchange.

As of 2020, Vanke was ranked 208th in the Fortune Global 500. Fortune reported the company having US$53.253 billion in revenue, US$248.360 billion worth of assets, and 131,505 employees that year.

Vanke was also ranked 96th in the Forbes Global 2000 in 2020.

As of 21 February 2019 its market cap was US$44 billion.

=== Financial struggle ===
In March 2024, Moody's Ratings downgraded Vanke's credit rating score to Ba1, citing "substantial credit risk" in the company.

Since the beginning of 2025, the company has been dealing with a huge amount of debt due amid a struggling property market. It has around 4.9 billion USD in bonds maturing in 2025, half of its public debt. By the end of 2025 the interest-bearing liabilities stood at 364.3 billion yuan ($52 billion)

==== Chinese government intervention ====
China state media the Economic Observer reported that Vanke's CEO Zhu Jiusheng was detained by public security authorities on January 15, 2025.

Officials in Shenzhen held a closed meeting on January 17, 2025 to discuss Vanke, which is based in the city. The local government has significant control over Vanke due to its largest shareholder being a state firm. The Shenzhen government intended to stabilize Vanke's operations. They planned to introduce new auditors and financial advisers to evaluate Vanke's finances and property projects for future actions.

Financial Information (Yuan)
Year	Operating Revenue	Operating Profit
2022	503,838,367,359	52,029,046,370
2023	465,739,076,702	29,251,702,064
2024	343,176,440,713	(45,643,796,281)

== See also ==
- Real estate in China
