= Dameisha Beach =

Beach in Shenzhen, Guangdong, China

Coordinates: 22.5963°N 114.3051°E

- Beach
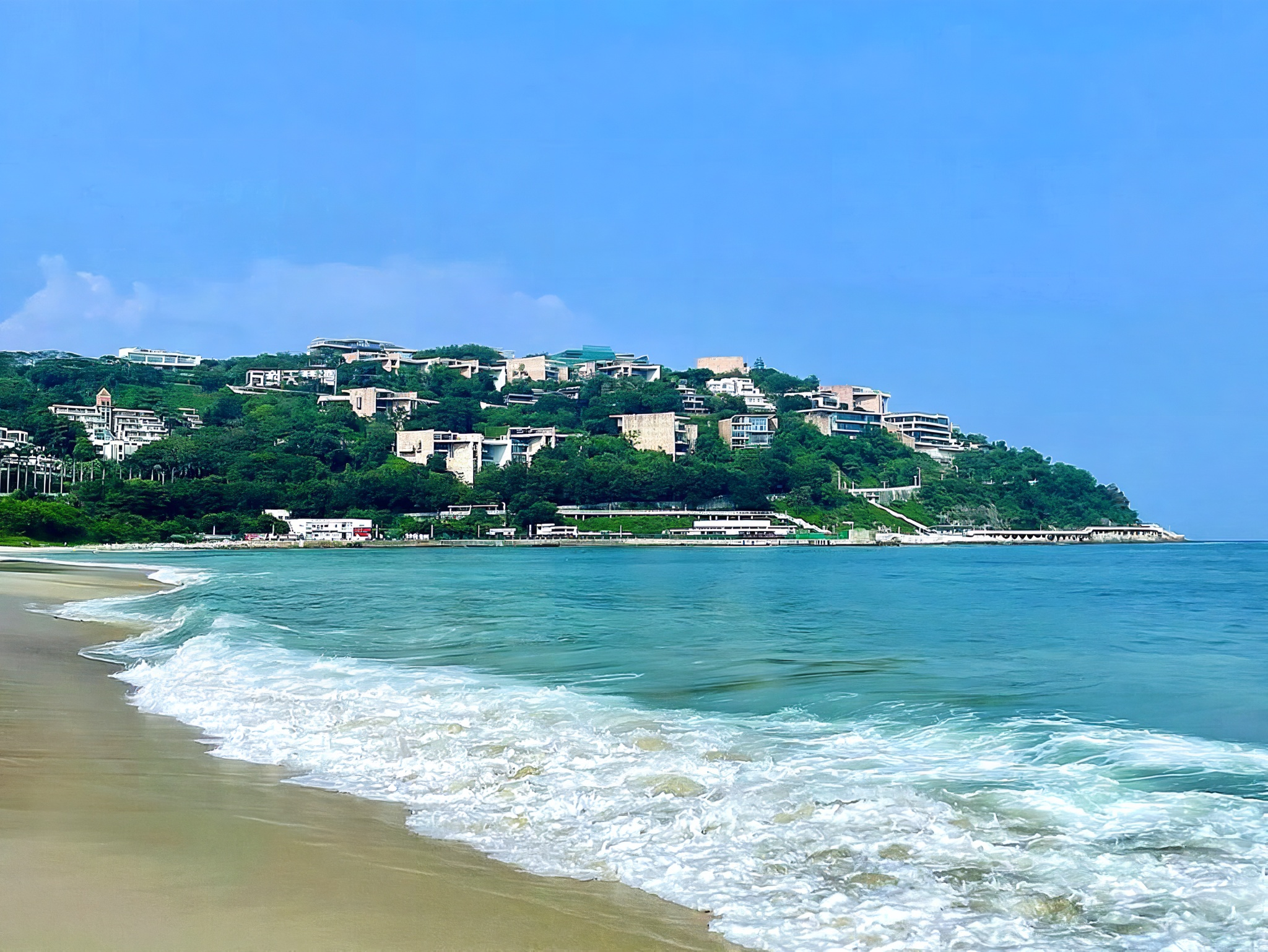
- Interactive map of Dameisha Beach
- Location: Yantian District, Shenzhen, China

Dimensions
  - Length: 1800m

Dameisha Beach (Chinese: 大梅沙海滨公园) is one of the largest beaches in Shenzhen, China. It is located on the northern shore of Mirs Bay along the Yantian District coastline and was opened to public in 1999. A Sheraton resort is located next to the beach.

== Economy ==
Vanke was headquartered in Vanke Center (万科中心) in Dameisha. The Horizontal Skyscraper was then turned into a school.

== Gallery ==
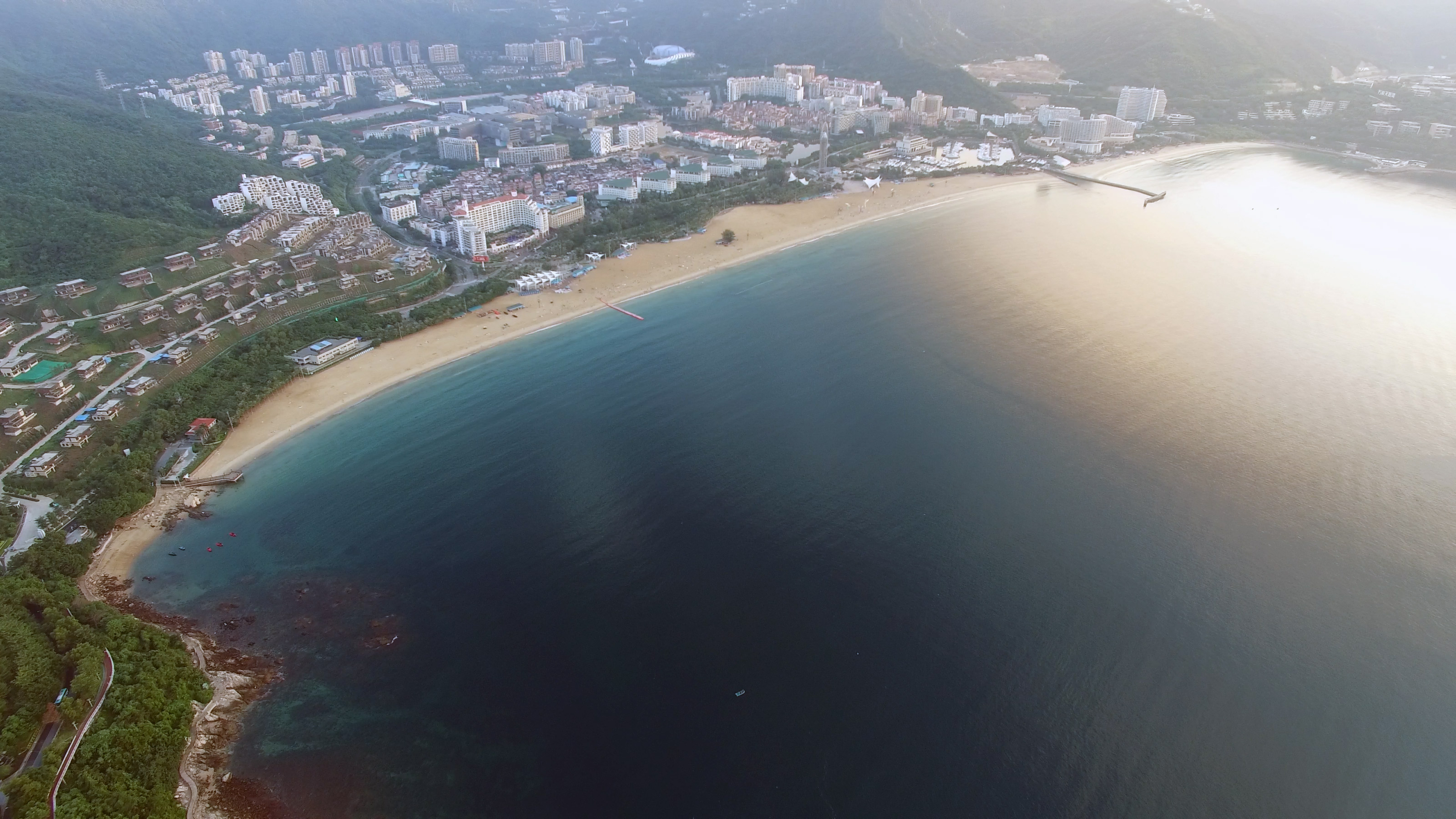

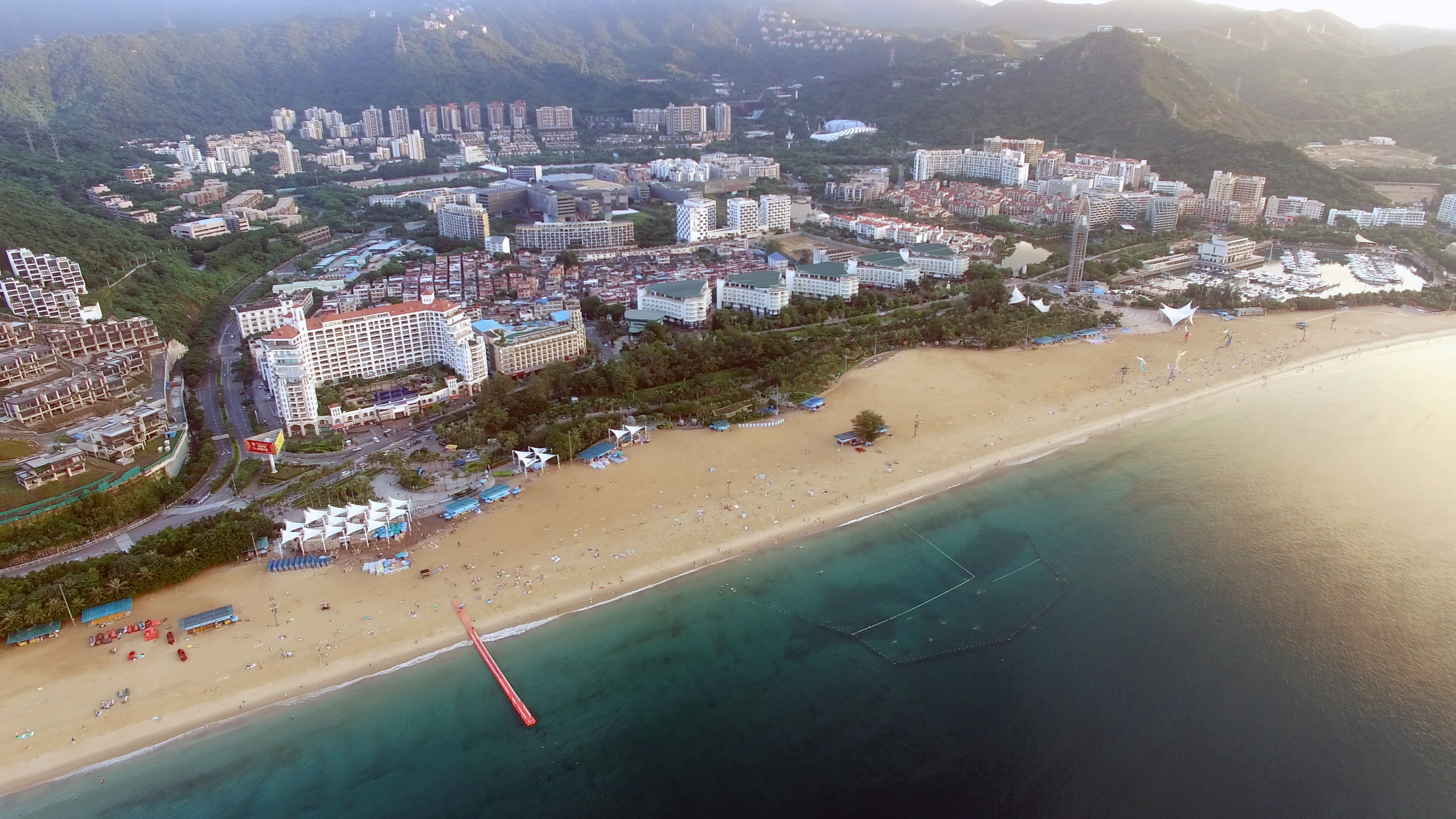

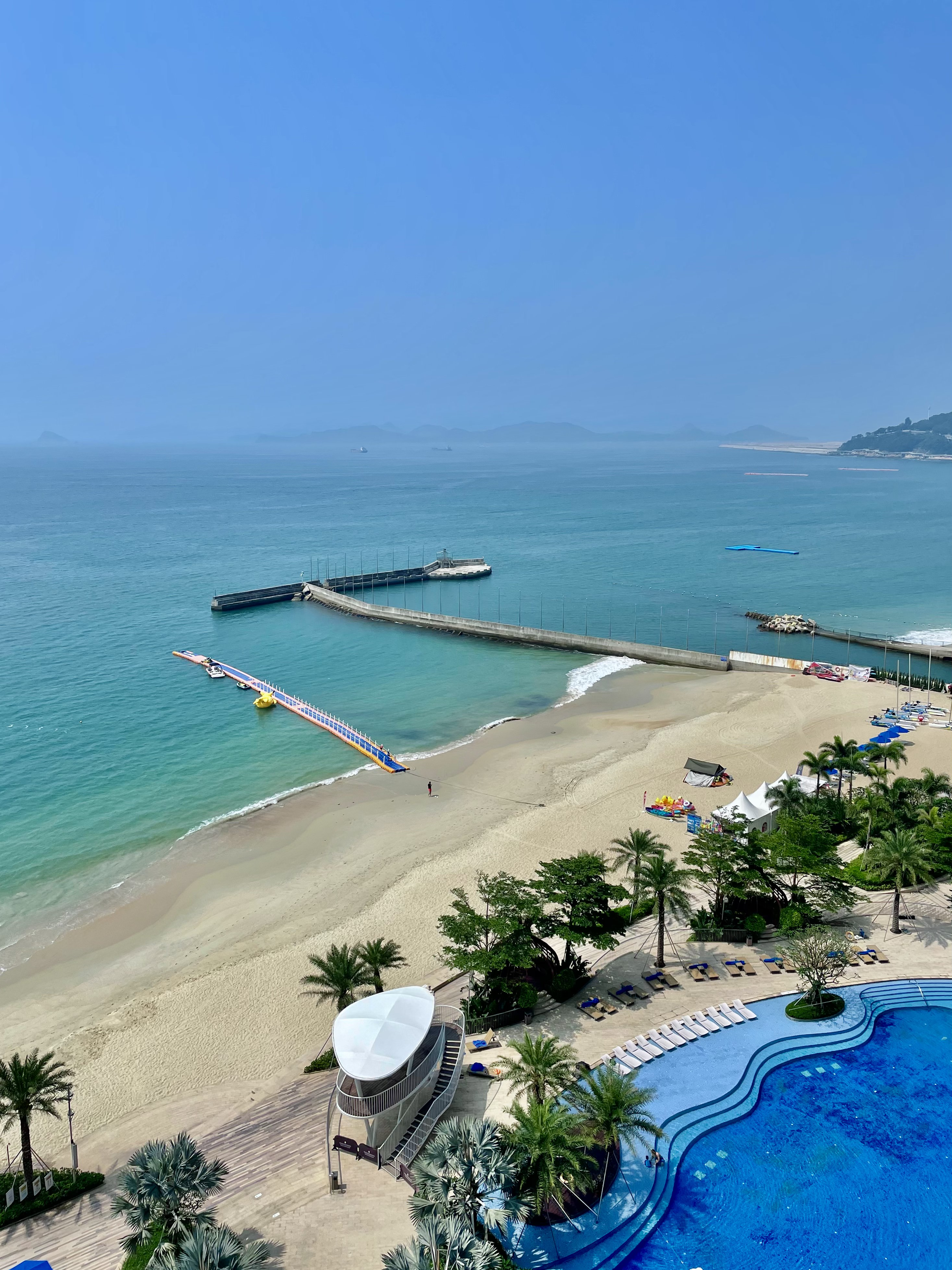

== See also ==
- List of parks in Shenzhen
