= Wutong Mountain South station =

Metro station in Shenzhen, China

Wutong Mountain South 梧桐山南
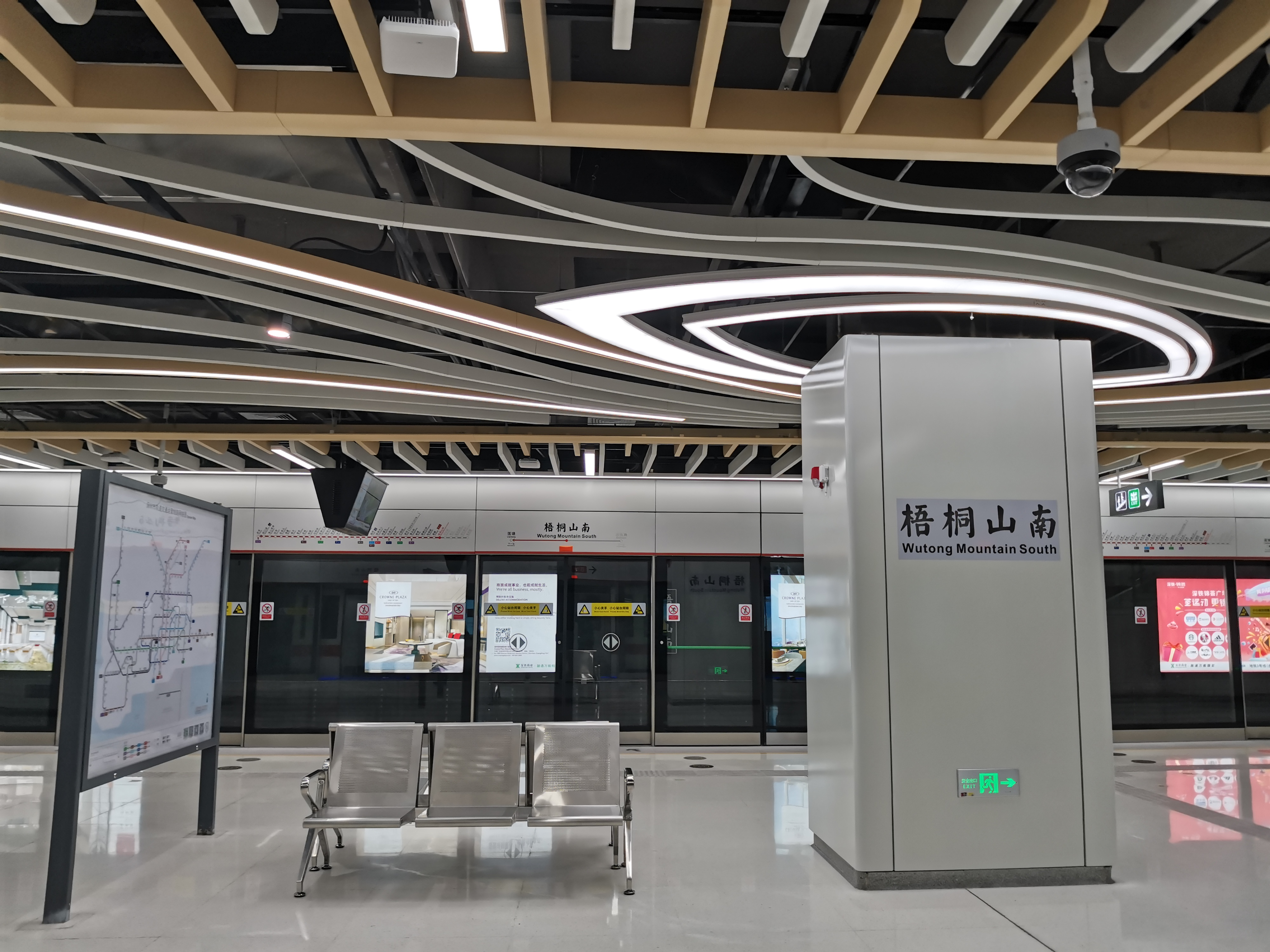
- Platform

Chinese name
- Chinese: 梧桐山南站
Transcriptions
Standard Mandarin
- Hanyu Pinyin: Wútóngshān Nán Zhàn

General information
- Location: Wutongshan South Road (梧桐山南路); Luohu District, Shenzhen, Guangdong; China
- Coordinates: 22°33′38.4″N 114°10′41.5″E
- Operator: Shenzhen Metro Group
- Line: Line 8
- Platforms: 2 (1 island platform)
- Tracks: 2

Construction
- Structure type: Underground
- Accessible: Yes

History
- Opened: 28 October 2020

Services
Preceding station	Shenzhen Metro	Following station
Liantang (Line 2) towards Chiwan	Line 8	Shatoujiao towards Xichong
Location

Wutong Mountain South (Chinese: 梧桐山南) is a station on Line 8 of the Shenzhen Metro. It opened on 28 October 2020.

== Station layout ==
G	Street level	Exit
B1F; Concourse	Lobby	Customer Service, Shops, Vending machines, ATMs
B2F; Platforms	Platform	← Line 8 towards Chiwan (Liantang)
B2F; Platforms	Island platform, doors will open on the left
B2F; Platforms	Platform	Line 8 towards Xichong (Shatoujiao) →

== Entrances/exits ==
- A1: North side of Luosha Rd (E), Luohu Branch of Shenzhen Public Security Bureau, Shenzhen Luohu Foreign Languages Junior High School, Dongfang Fengyatai
- A2: West side of 7th Road (N), Wutongyuan, Huilan Yaju
- C1: North side of Luosha Rd (E), Wutong Mountain Management Building, Shenzhen Xiantong Experimental Primaty School, Yuyaju, Hongwei·Hongjing Cuifeng, Vanke·Dongfang Zunyu
- C2: South side of Luosha Rd (E), Changlingcun, Huiming Garden, Changling Garden, KingKey Yujing Tianluan Mansion
- D: East side of Wutongshan South Road (N), Xiantong Sports Park, Wutongshan Scenic and Historical Area
