= Haishan station (Shenzhen Metro) =

Metro station in Shenzhen, Guangdong, China

Haishan 海山
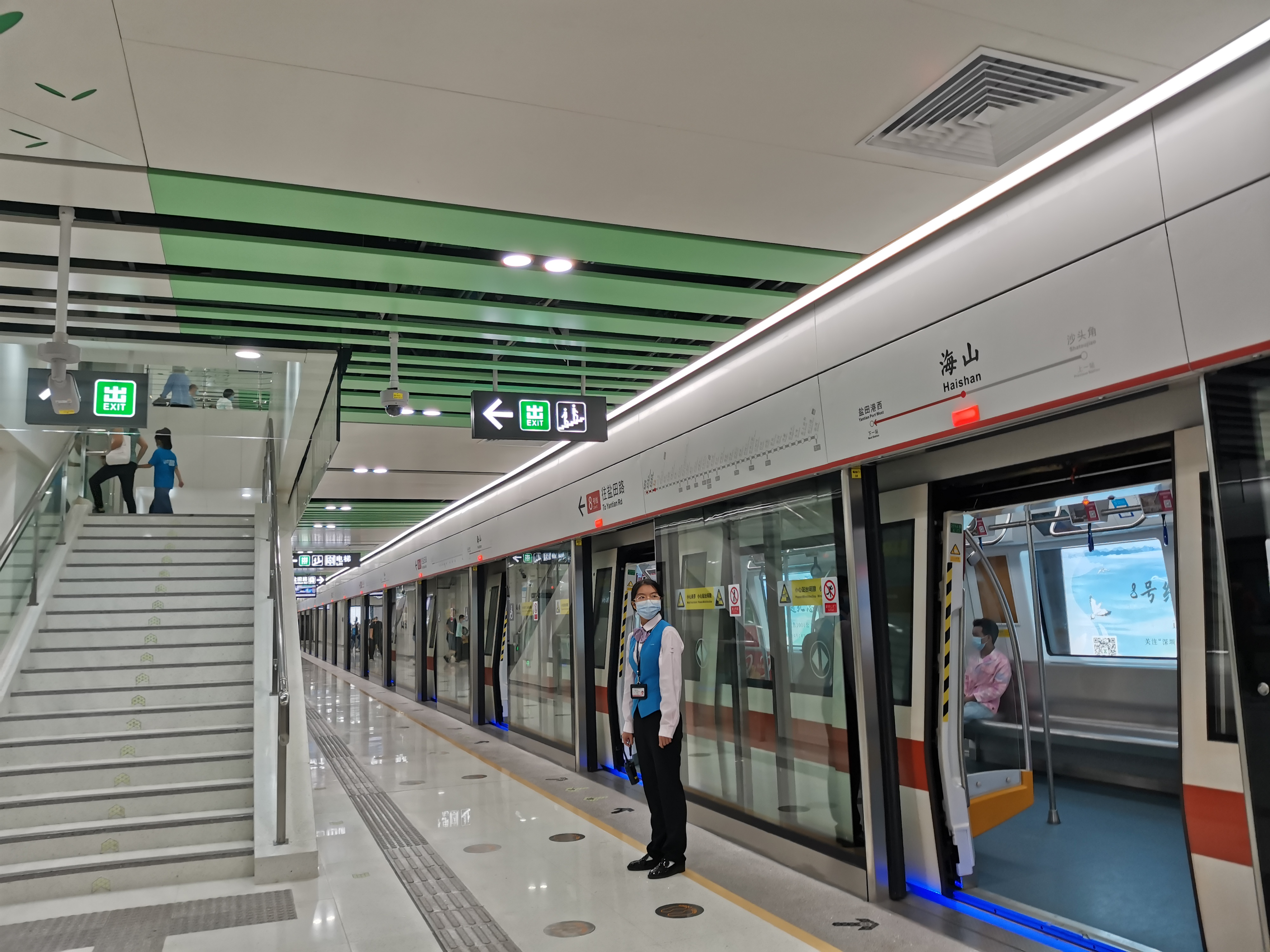
- Platform

Chinese name
- Chinese: 海山站
Transcriptions
Standard Mandarin
- Hanyu Pinyin: Hǎishān Zhàn

General information
- Location: Shenyan Road (深盐路) × Haishan Road (海山路); Haishan Subdistrict, Yantian District, Shenzhen, Guangdong; China
- Coordinates: 22°33′30.6″N 114°13′59.1″E
- Operator: Shenzhen Metro Group
- Line: Line 8
- Platforms: 2 (1 island platform)
- Tracks: 2

Construction
- Structure type: Underground
- Accessible: Yes

History
- Opened: 28 October 2020

Services
Preceding station	Shenzhen Metro	Following station
Shatoujiao towards Liantang (Line 2: Chiwan)	Line 8	Yantian Port West towards Xichong
Location

Haishan (Chinese: 海山) is a station on Line 8 of the Shenzhen Metro. It opened on 28 October 2020.

== Station layout ==
G	Street level	Exit
B1F; Concourse	Lobby	Customer Service, Shops, Vending machines, ATMs
B2F; Platforms	Platform	← Line 8 towards Chiwan (Shatoujiao)
B2F; Platforms	Island platform, doors will open on the left
B2F; Platforms	Platform	Line 8 towards Xichong (Yantian Port West) →

== Entrances/exits ==
- A1: South side of Shenyan Rd (W), Pengwan Community Workstation, Donghe Community Service Station, Yantian District Maternity & Child Healthcare Hospital, Yantian Central Park, Tiandong Middle School, Tianxin Primary Scholl, Yantian District, Pengwan Garden 1 Cun, Lan Jun Zuo An
- A2: North side of Shenyan Rd (W), Yantian District Government, Wutong Community Workstation, Yantian District People’s Hospital, Yantian Library, Anjing New Village
- B: South side of Shenyan Rd (E), Yantian Taxation Bureau, Coastal Plank, Lighthouse Library, Shenzhen YantianForeign Language Primary School, Shatoujiao Bonded Area
- C: North side of Shenyan Rd (E), Haishan Sub-District Office, Yantian District Government, Yantian District People's Court, Tiandong Community Workstation, Guangdong Wutong Mountain National Forest Park, Haishan Park, Tiandong Primary School, Hai Shan Ju, Hai Rong Ju, Green View Garden, Enshang Reservoir
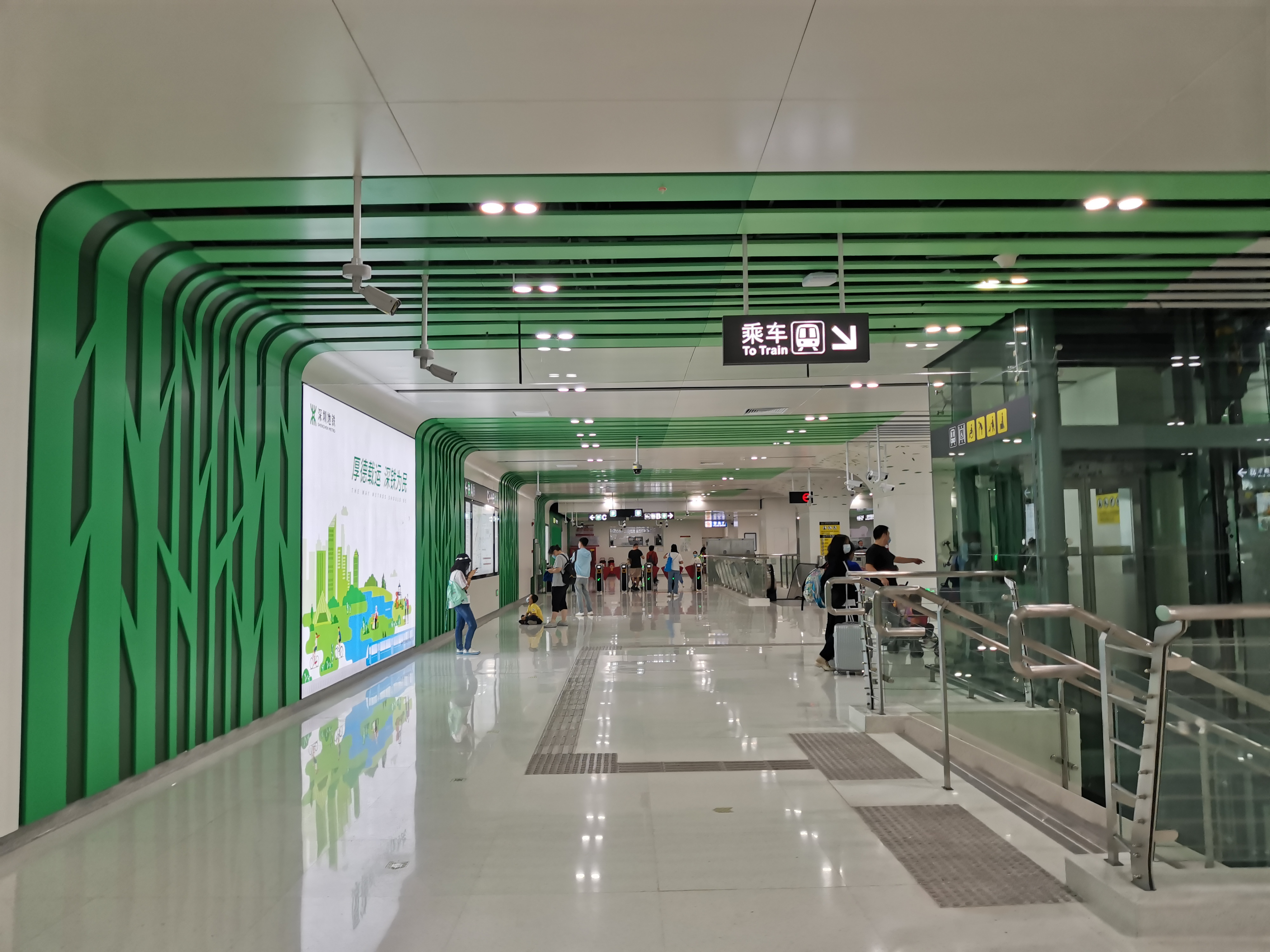
Concourse

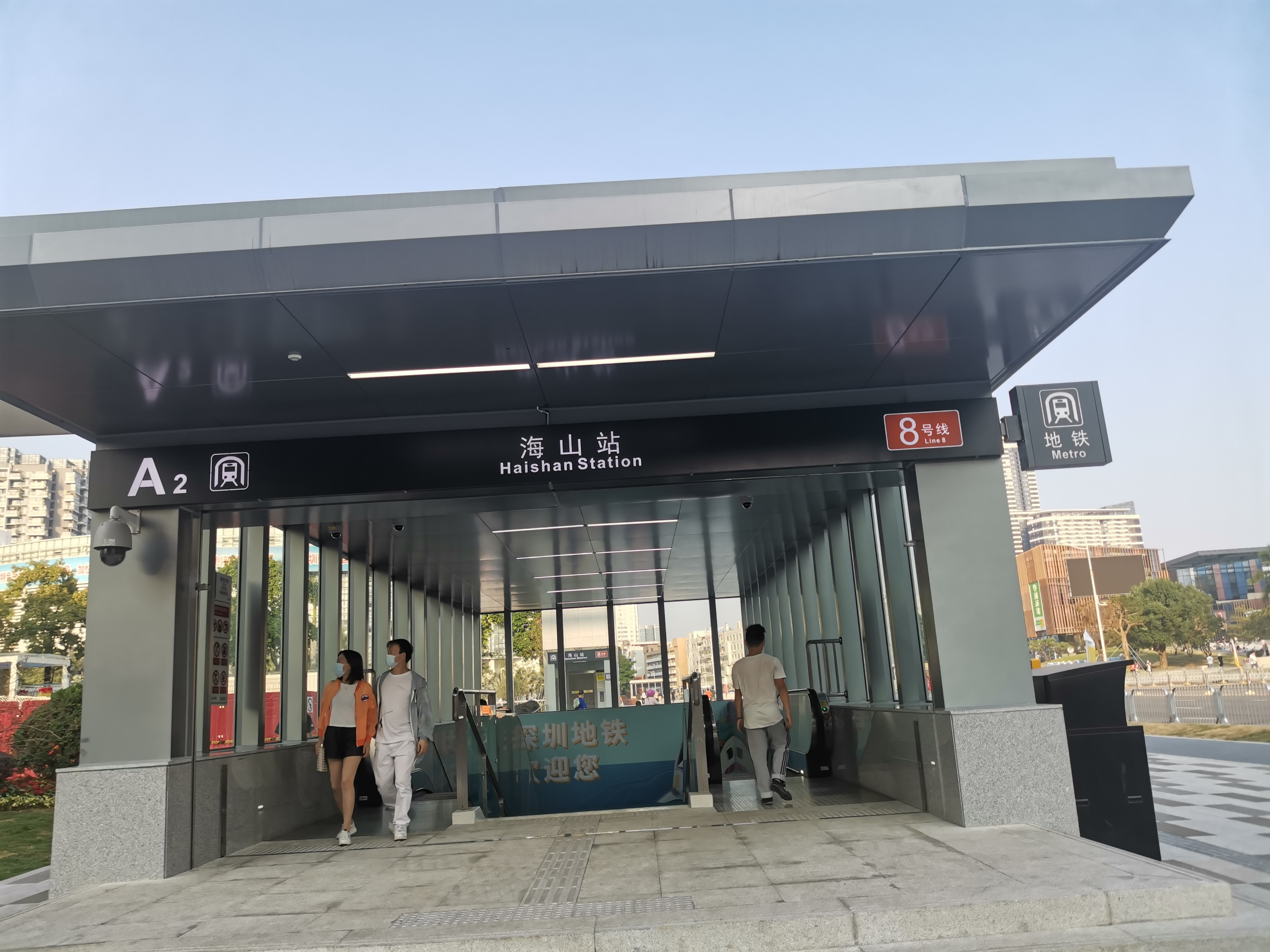
Exit A2

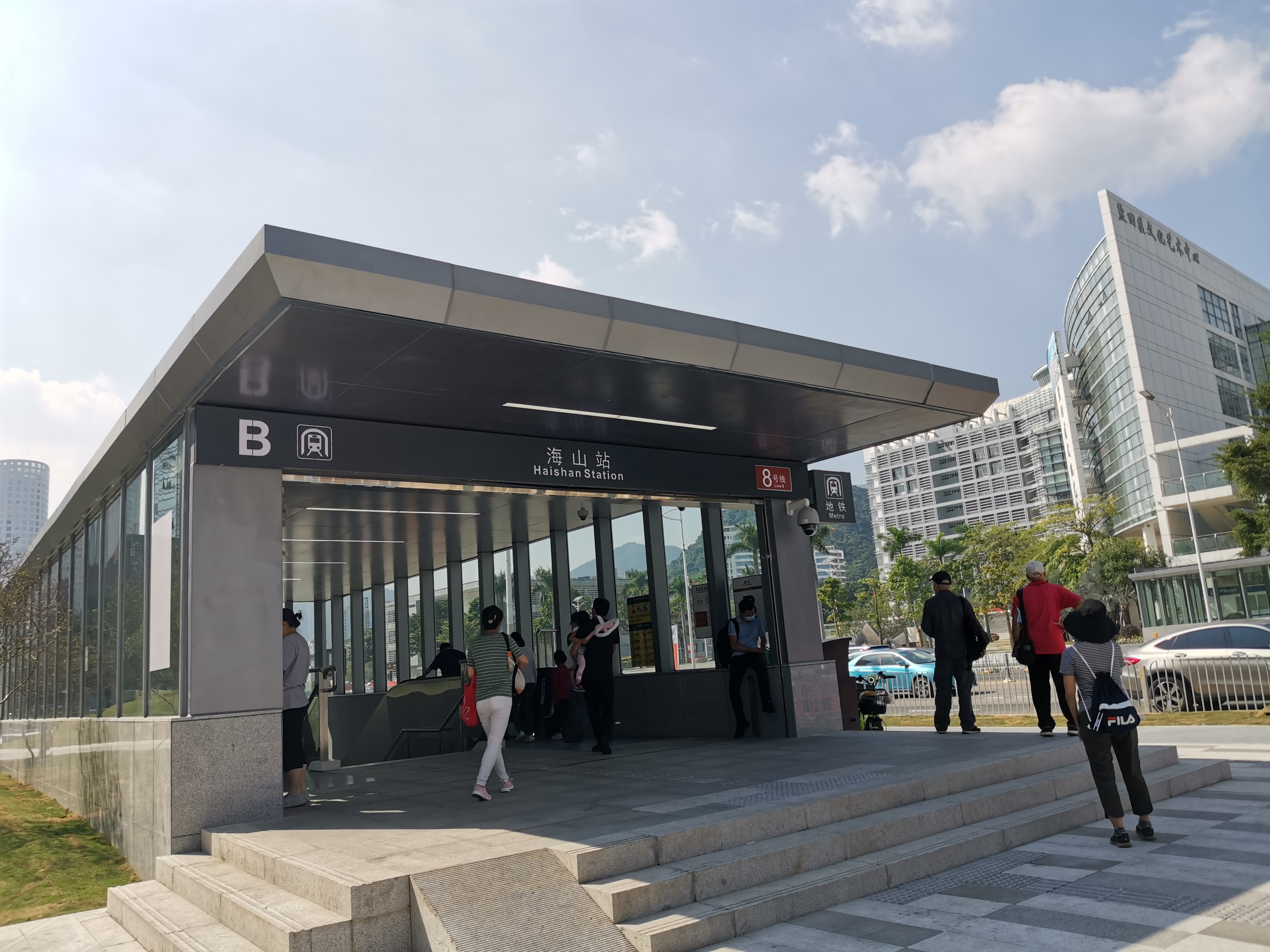
Exit B
