= Wang Shi (entrepreneur) =

Chinese businessman (born 1951)

- 王石
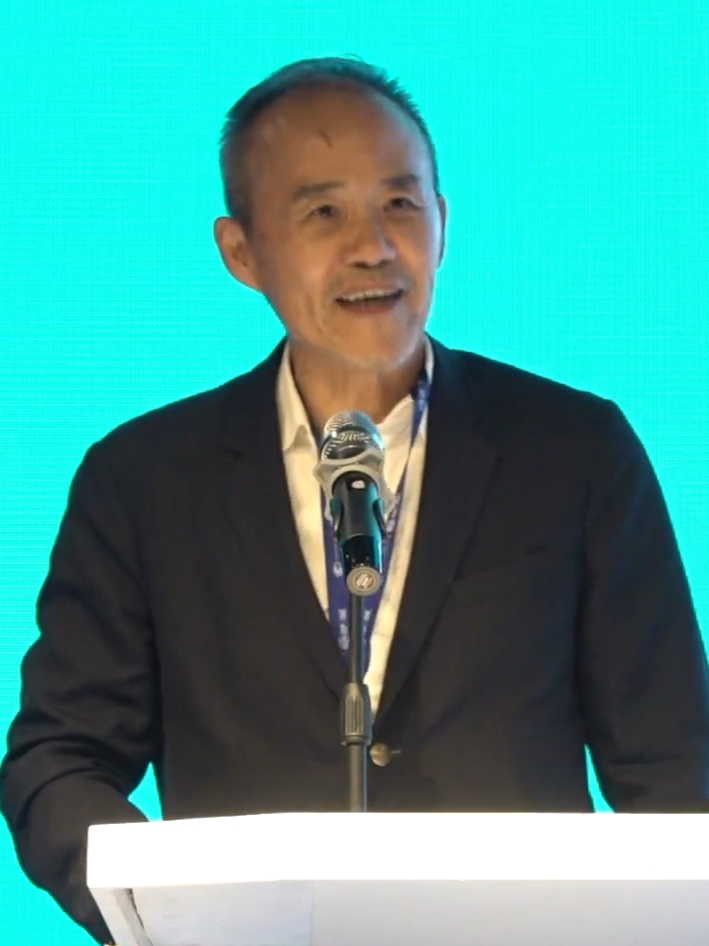
- Wang in 2023
- Born: 23 January 1951 (age 75); Liuzhou, Guangxi, China
- Education: Lanzhou Jiaotong University (B.S.)
- Occupation: Entrepreneur
- Organization: China Vanke
- Known for: real estate
- Spouse(s): Wang Jiangsui (m. 1979; div. 2012) Meme Tian Pujun (m. 2018?)

Wang Shi (Chinese: 王石; pinyin: Wáng Shí, born 1951) is a Chinese businessman. In 1984, he founded China Vanke. Following Vanke's shareholding reform in 1988, he served as chairman and general manager, and from 1999 to 2017 as chairman, after which he became honorary chairman. In 2011, Wang was named by Fortune as one of "Fifteen Business Leaders Who've Changed China." Since 2011, he has largely withdrawn from the day-to-day management of Vanke and, throughout the 2010s, pursued visiting study programs abroad. In the 2020s, he became active in venture capital and private equity, with a focus on the environmental sector.

== Early life ==
Wang was born in Liuzhou, Guangxi, with ancestral roots in Jinzhai County, Anhui. He is the third child and eldest son among eight siblings. His parents both had military backgrounds and, after the founding of the People's Republic of China, were assigned to positions within the railway system. The family relocated multiple times, living in cities including Liuzhou, Guangzhou, Beijing, and Zhengzhou. Wang's father was a military disciple of general Wang Zhen, who was also Wang Shi's godfather. His mother was of Xibe ethnicity and a native of Yi County, Liaoning.

At the beginning the Cultural Revolution, Wang's parents were politically sidelined, which disrupted his early education. In 1968, after his family was cleared, Wang enlisted in the People's Liberation Army and served as an automotive soldier in the air force. After spending five years in Xinjiang, he completed his military service in 1973 and was demobilized to the Zhengzhou Railway Bureau's hydropower division, where he worked as a laborer in a boiler overhaul workshop.

In 1974, when the railway bureau was allotted two university admission recommendations, Wang was selected to attend Lanzhou Railway Institute (now Lanzhou Jiaotong University). According to Wang's autobiography, his selection followed a collective recommendation by senior workers who regarded him as diligent and resilient; while at the time, his father was the deputy director of the Liuzhou Railway Bureau. Wang studied water supply and drainage engineering and graduated with a B.S. degree in 1978.

== Career ==
After graduation, Wang worked at the Guangzhou Railway Administration as a technician before he resigned. In 1980, Wang tested into the Guangdong Provincial Commission of Foreign Economic Relations and Trade, where he worked on attracting foreign investment. He remained there for six years before moving to Shenzhen.

During the early 1980s, Wang accumulated his initial capital by working as an intermediary in the animal feed trade, including the resale of corn. Using these proceeds, he established the Shenzhen Modern Science and Education Instruments Exhibition Center, which engaged in the import and sale of electronic and office equipment from Japan, and later expanded into a range of manufacturing and trading activities.

In 1983, Wang joined the Shenzhen Special Economic Zone Development Corporation. In 1984, Wang established the Shenzhen Modern Science and Education Instruments Exhibition Center, the predecessor of China Vanke, and served as its general manager. In 1988, the enterprise was renamed China Vanke and underwent a shareholding reform. That year, Vanke participated in a land auction in Shenzhen, marking its entry into the real estate sector. In early 1989, Vanke completed its shareholding reform and raised RMB 28 million in capital. On 29 January 1991, the company was listed on the Shenzhen Stock Exchange. Prior to the listing, Wang relinquished his 40% equity stake in the company.

In 1994, Wang led Vanke through a corporate governance conflict over control of the company. Junan Securities, acting through affiliated shareholders holding approximately 10.7% of Vanke's shares, issued an open letter calling for a restructuring of the company and its management. In response, Wang led Vanke's management to seek a temporary trading suspension on the Shenzhen Stock Exchange, during which he worked to consolidate shareholder and municipal support. Trading resumed within days, and following regulatory attention from the China Securities Regulatory Commission, the dispute was de-escalated, leaving Wang's control of the company intact.

In 1999, Wang resigned as Vanke's general manager, and Yu Liang was appointed executive vice president and chief financial officer. From June 2011, Wang largely withdrew from the company's day-to-day management and pursued visiting study programs abroad throughout the 2010s, including at Harvard University, University of Cambridge, University of Oxford, and Hebrew University of Jerusalem, until the COVID-19 pandemic. In 2017, Wang and Yu facilitated the entry of Shenzhen Metro Group as the controlling shareholder of Vanke. Yu subsequently succeeded Wang as chairman, while Wang became honorary chairman.

From 2024, amid a prolonged downturn in China's real estate market and mounting cash-flow pressures at Vanke, Wang relinquished his annual retirement compensation of RMB 10 million.

== Personal life ==
=== Relationships ===
Wang's first wife is Wang Jiangsui, whose father, Wang Ning (born Xu Gaoke), served as a member of Guangdong's provincial party standing committee from 1976 to 1982 and later as deputy party secretary of Guangdong from 1982 to 1988. They married in 1979, and their daughter, Wang Weilan, was born the following year. Wang Jiangsui did not participate in the management of Vanke. After her daughter went to the United States for education in 2003, Wang Jiangsui traveled there frequently. In 2006, she was involved in a traffic accident in the United States, which resulted in the loss of vision in one eye. In 2007, she purchased 46,900 shares of Vanke A stock; the transaction was reviewed by the Shenzhen Stock Exchange and found not to have violated relevant regulations. She subsequently sold the shares and remitted the proceeds to the company. They divorced in 2012.

Wang's second wife is Meme Tian Pujun, an actress-turned-businesswoman. They met through an introduction by businessman Feng Lun, who, via a high-end travel venture he invested in, organized overseas trips for business associates that were occasionally joined by starlets. Tian, then a working actress who also undertook real estate sales work, met Wang during one such trip in 2008. In 2009, the two traveled together to Taiwan, New Zealand, and Brazil. In 2011, Wang undertook visiting studies in the United States, while Tian also went to the United States for further education. At the time, Wang was based in Boston and Tian in New York. In 2012, their relationship received wide attention due to Tian's thinly-veiled social media posts. Wang publicly acknowledged their marriage for the first time in 2018. They have a daughter, born in 2021.

=== Politics ===
In 1989, Wang led the Vanke employees in Shenzhen in a march expressing support for the students' protests in Beijing. As a result, he was placed on a local government blacklist and was detained for a year. Following his release, Wang initially spoke publicly about the events of 1989 and expressed regret over his participation. In interviews with Time in 1997 and The Washington Post in 1999, he described his decision to lead the march as a mistake, stating that, as chairman, he was a symbolic figure rather than acting purely in a personal capacity and that he should have resigned before taking part. By 2008, when The New York Times published a profile of Wang, he had become one of China’s wealthiest men and, through a spokesperson, denied having participated in the march.

=== Expeditions ===
Wang loves mountaineering, gliding, and seafaring. In 2001, he was awarded an honor from National Sports Authority, and in 2002 he was elected the vice-chairman of Chinese Hiking Association. He has made successful attempts on reaching the highest summits of seven continents from 2002 to 2004.

In May 2003, Wang and a Chinese amateur team made a successful attempt on reaching the summit of Mount Everest. At the age of 53, he broke the Chinese record as the oldest Chinese national who has reached the summit of Mount Everest.

In April and September 2005, he successfully trekked to the North Pole and the South Pole, achieving his goal of "climbing the highest summits of seven continents and reaching the North and South Poles."

In May 2010, Wang, at age 60, made another successful attempt on reaching the summit of Mount Everest alongside his friend Wang Jian, and broke the Chinese age record he created back in 2003.

== Controversy ==
=== 2008 Sichuan Earthquake Donation Controversy ===
Following the 2008 Sichuan earthquake, Vanke donated RMB 2 million in disaster relief. In response to public criticism over the perceived insufficiency of the donation, Wang published a blog post on 15 May defending the amount as appropriate: “China is a country prone to frequent disasters, and disaster-relief philanthropy is therefore a regular occurrence; corporate donations should be sustainable rather than becoming a burden.” Wang also disclosed that, within Vanke’s internal charitable fundraising initiatives, donations by rank-and-file staff were capped at RMB 10. Amid public backlash, Vanke convened an extraordinary shareholders’ meeting, at which Wang apologized for his statements and acknowledged that he had caused significant damage to the brand image. The shareholders’ meeting approved a proposal to increase donations by RMB 100 million. In 2018, Wang described the period following the 2008 Sichuan earthquake as his “darkest moment” among all the business crises.
