= Yantian, Shenzhen =

Coordinates: 22.5637°N 114.24°E

Yantian 盐田区
- District
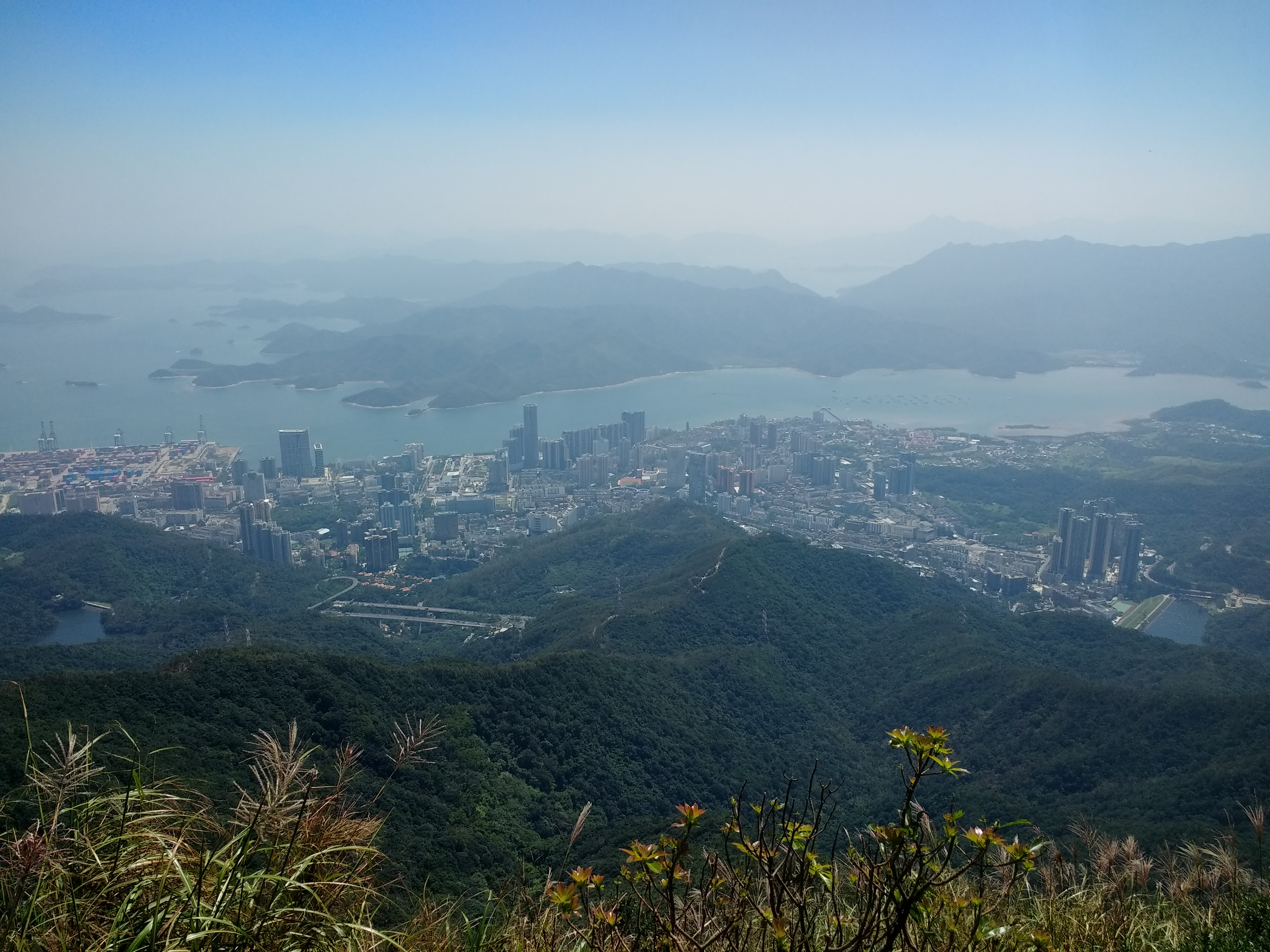
- Yantian District seen from Wutong Mountain

- Yantian District (highlighted in blue) in Shenzhen
- Country: People's Republic of China
- Province: Guangdong
- Sub-provincial city: Shenzhen

Area
  - Total: 72.63 km^{2} (28.04 sq mi)

Population (2020)
  - Total: 214,225
  - Density: 2,950/km^{2} (7,639/sq mi)
- Time zone: UTC+8 (China Standard)
- Postal code: 518083
- Area code: 0755
- Licence plates: 粤B
- Website: english.yantian.gov.cn

Yantian District (simplified Chinese: 盐田区; traditional Chinese: 鹽田區; pinyin: Yántián Qū; Jyutping: Jim^{4}tin^{4} Keoi^{1}) is one of the nine districts of the city of Shenzhen, Guangdong, China. It is adjacent to Shenzhen River and Hong Kong to the south, and is surrounded by Luohu, Longgang and Pingshan districts of Shenzhen.

Before 1960s, the northern part of the district belonged to Huiyang County (now Huiyang District, Huizhou). The famous Huizhou Uprising launched by Dr. Sun Yat-sen started in the northern part of the district during 1900. The failure of the revolution had inspired Dr. Sun to revolt against the Qing dynasty, which soon ended in 1912 after the Wuchang Uprising.

Due to the proximity to Bao'an County, Northern Yantian merged into the new County in 1960s. In 1978, after the establishment of Shenzhen Special Economic Zone (SEZ), Yantian (as a part of Luohu District), together with several other districts in Bao'an County, formed the new special economic district. In March 1998, Yantian separated from Luohu District after the construction of Yantian Port Area of Shenzhen Port.

== Subdistricts ==
The size of Yantian district is about 72.63 km^{2} (28.04 sq mi), divided into four subdistricts:

Name	Chinese (S)	Hanyu Pinyin	Canton Romanization	Population (2010)	Area (km^{2})
Haishan Subdistrict	海山街道	Hǎishān Jiēdào	hoi2 san1 gai1 dou6	61,858	5.52
Yantian Subdistrict	盐田街道	Yántián Jiēdào	yim4 tin4 gai1 dou6	80,641	17.8
Meisha Subdistrict	梅沙街道	Méishā Jiēdào	mui4 sa1 gai1 dou6	18,063	16.83
Shatoujiao Subdistrict	沙头角街道	Shātóujiǎo Jiēdào	sa1 teo4 gog3 gai1 dou6	48,798	6.91

Located on Mirs Bay, Yantian is the location of some of Shenzhen's best-known tourist beaches, Dameisha and Xiaomeisha. Yantian Port Area is also located within the district.

== Economy ==
Vanke is headquartered in Vanke Center (万科中心) in Dameisha, Yantian District.

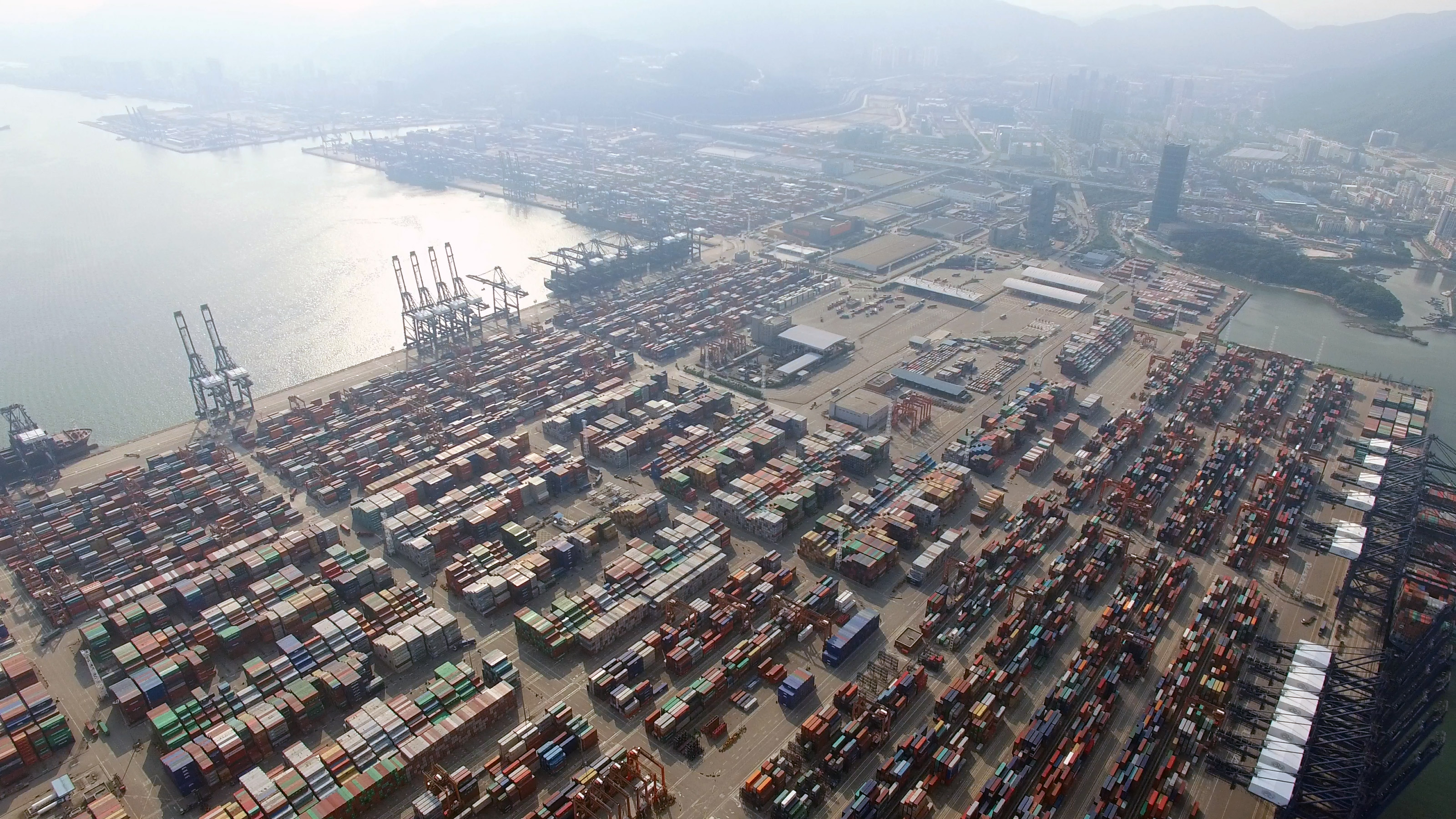
Yantian Port

=== Industrial zone ===
The Shenzhen Yantian Port Free Trade Zone was set up and approved by the State Council on September 27, 1996, with a total area of 0.85 square kilometer. On August 16, 2004, the project of "zone-port interaction" was approved by the State Council between Yantian Port Area and the Shenzhen Yantian Port Free Trade Zone.

Yantian Port Bonded Logistics Park was established on 0.96 square kilometer on December 30, 2005. The zone is situated near Yantian Port Area. Industries that are encouraged include printing/publishing/packaging, raw material processing, shipping/warehousing/logistics, and trading and distribution.

== Tourist attractions ==
- Chung Ying Street (中英街)
- Wutongshan National Park (梧桐山國家森林公園/梧桐山国家森林公园)
- Dameisha Beach (大梅沙)
- Xiaomeisha Beach (小梅沙)
- Shenzhen Xiaomeisha Sea World (小梅沙海洋世界)
- OCT East (東部華僑城/东部华侨城)
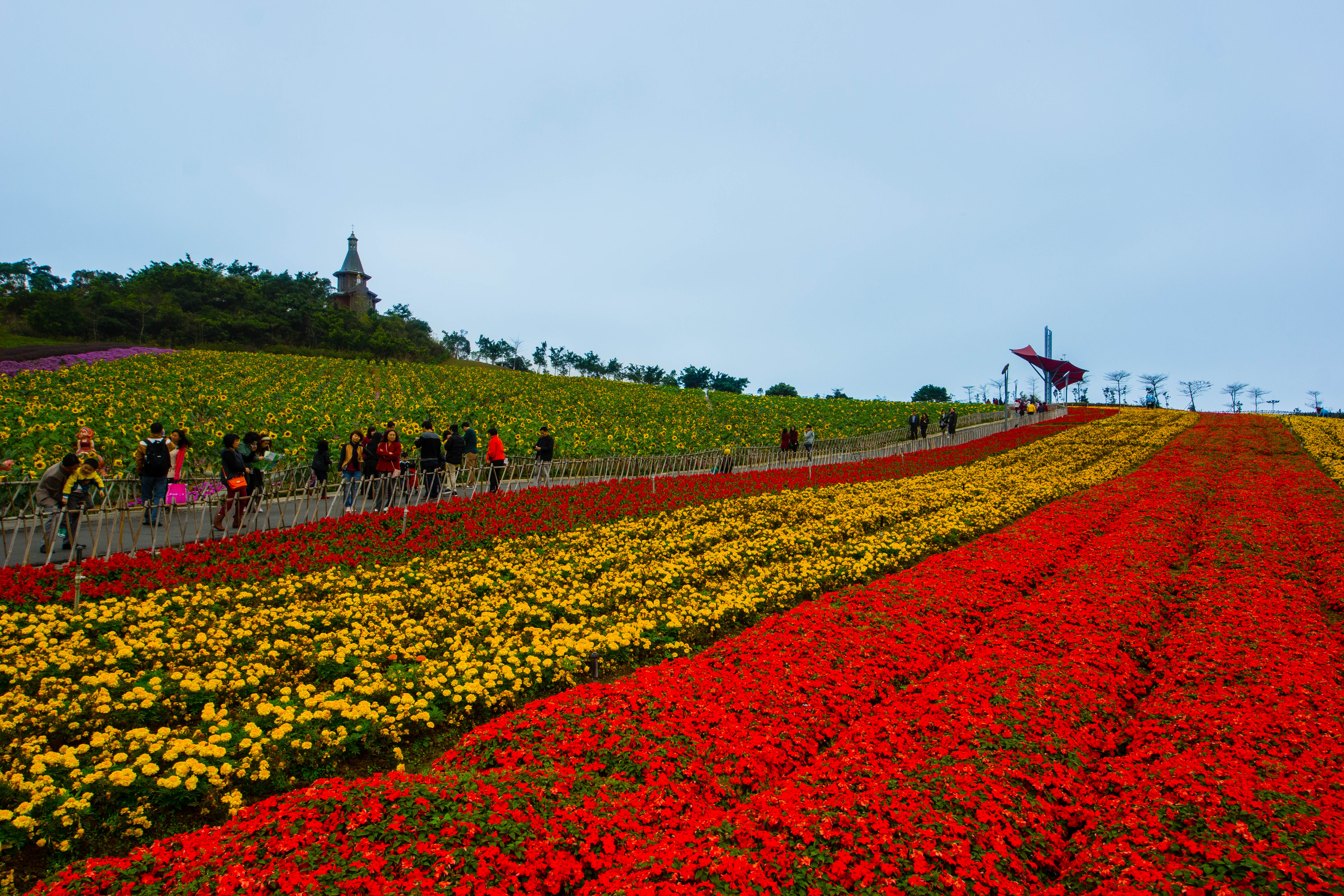
Flower Field in OCT East

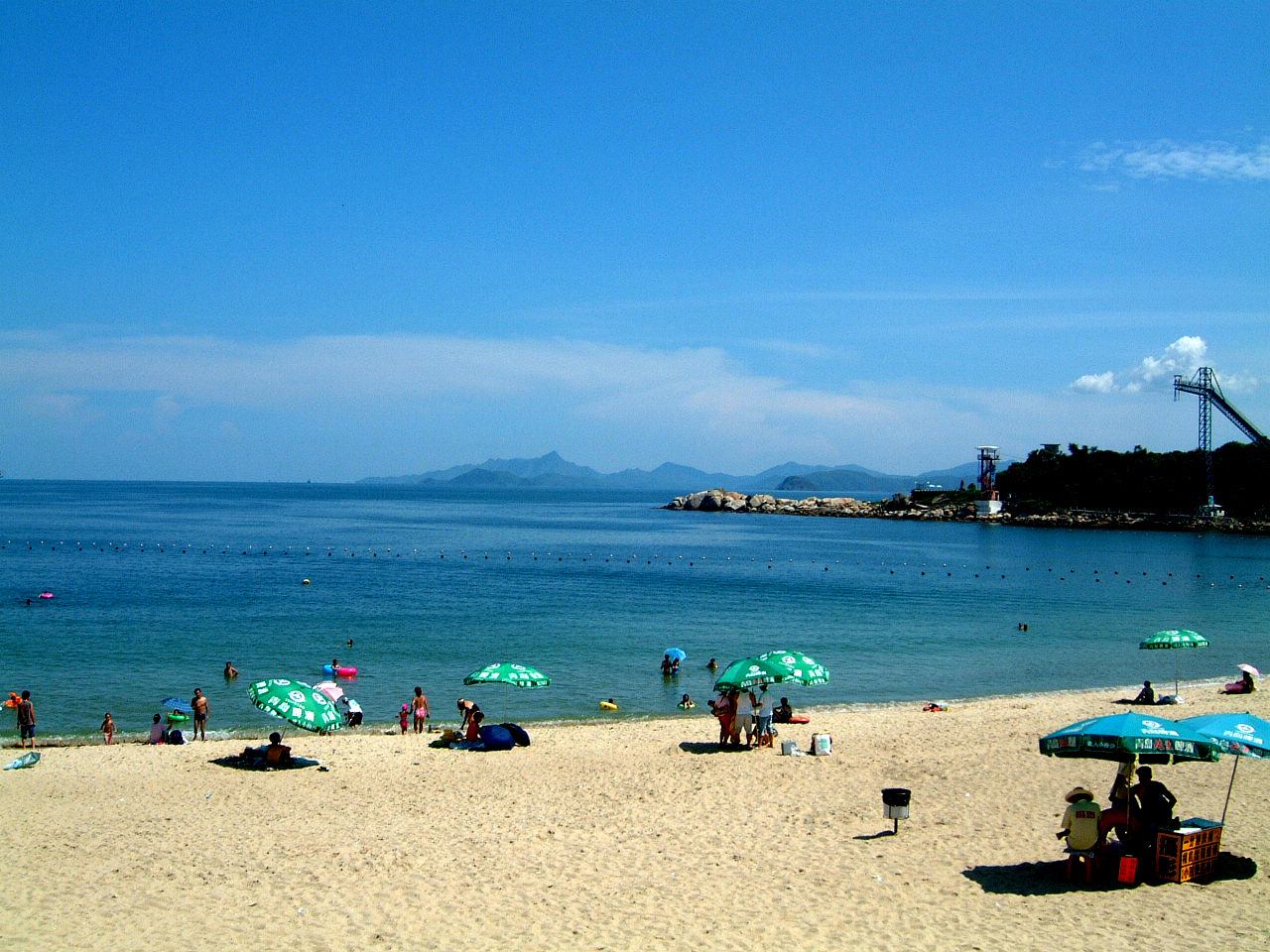
Xiaomeisha Beach

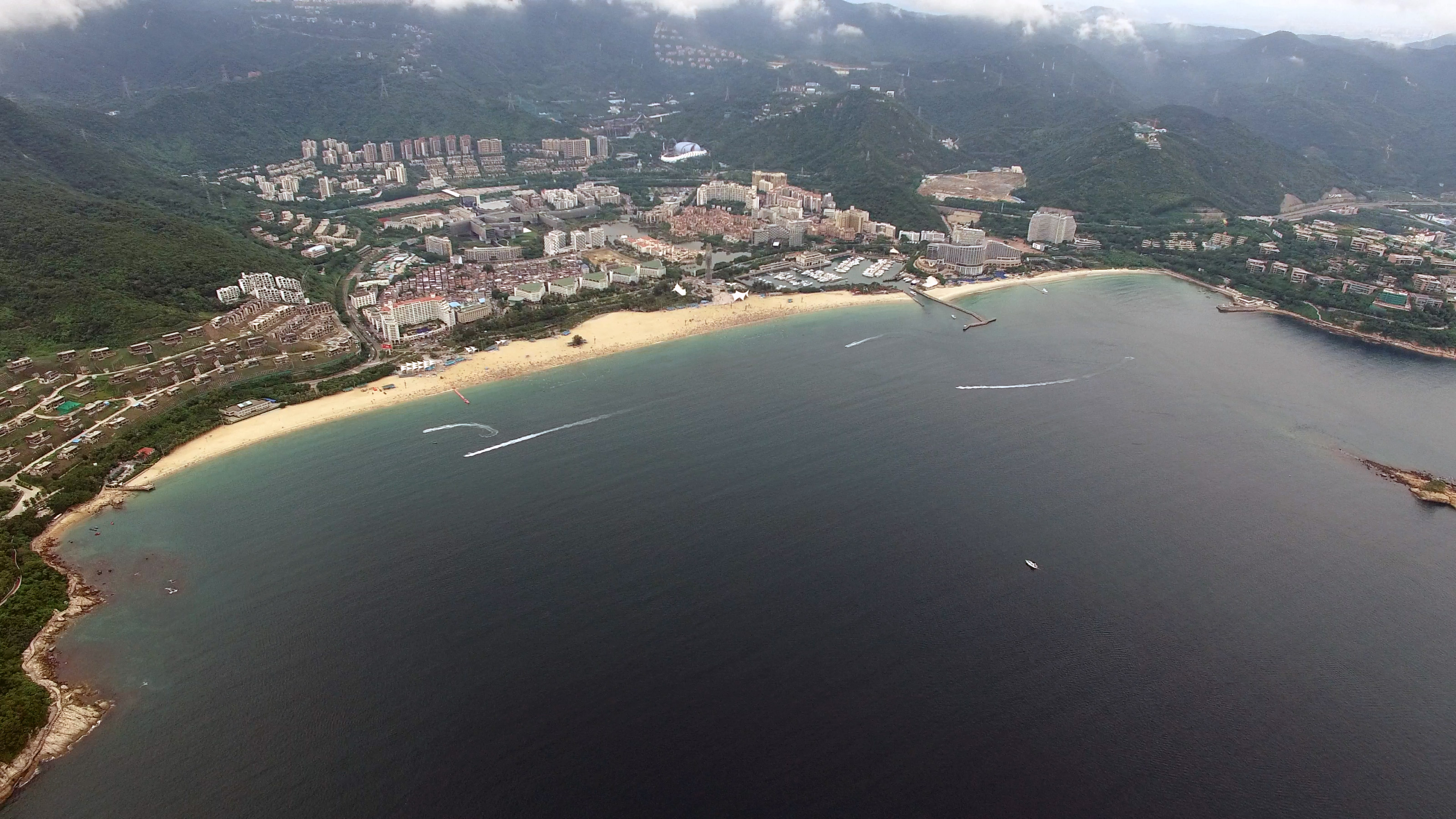
Dameisha beach

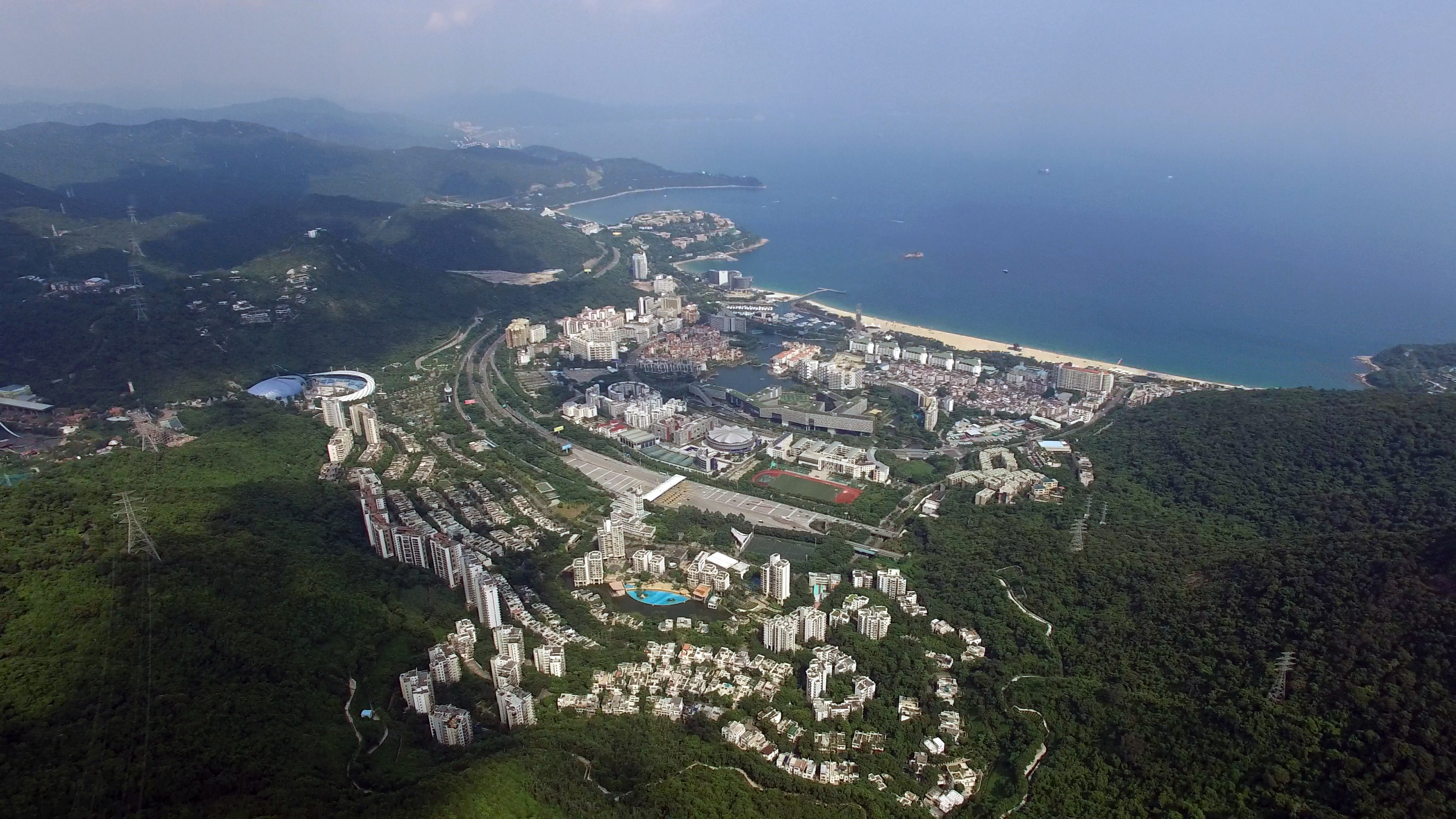
Dameisha as viewed from OCT East

== Education ==
Schools operated by the Shenzhen Municipal Government

- Shenzhen Foreign Languages School Senior High School Division

== Transportation ==
The main bus routes covering Yantian District are shown in the table below. Shenzhen Metro Line 8 also serves the area. Moreover, there is a ferry between Yantian Seafood Street and Nan'ao, Dapeng New District.

Route No.	Terminal 1	Terminal 2	Fare	Note
68	Shenzhen Foreign Language School	Shatoujiao Bus Terminal	2 RMB	
85	Yantian N. Bus Terminal	W. Square of Shenzhen E. Railway Station	2-5 RMB	
308	Dameisha Coastal Depot	Sanlian Terminal	2-6 RMB	
358	Funing Terminal	Shatoujiao Bus Terminal	2-6 RMB	
B662	Shatoujiao Bus Terminal	Shatoujiao Bus Terminal	1 RMB	Anti-clockwise loop
B924	Shatoujiao Bus Terminal	Shatoujiao Bus Terminal	1 RMB	
B925	Shenzhen Foreign Language School	Yantian Seafood St.	1 RMB	
B927	Yantian E. Bus Terminal	Yantian E. Bus Terminal	1 RMB	Unidirectional 8-shaped loop
B982	Shenzhen Foreign Language School	Yantian District Government N.	1 RMB	
E11	Xinda Terminal	Shenzhen N. Railway Station	10 RMB	
E26	Dapeng Intercity Bus Station	Futian Transport Hub	10 RMB	
M191	Bao'an Transit Center	Dameisha Depot	2-10 RMB	
M196	Xiaomeisha Community	Zhongying Street Border Station	1 RMB	
M199	Rose Coast Terminal	Jianshe Rd. Terminal	2-8 RMB	
M205	Yantian N. Bus Terminal	Railway Station	3 RMB	
M314	Hongmian Rd. Depot	Liantang Checkpoint Terminal	3 RMB	
M348	Shenzhen Foreign Language School	Tianbei Terminal	3 RMB	
M362	Kuichong Terminal	Yewucun	3 RMB	
M380	Kangqiao Terminal	Xiaomeisha Terminal	3 RMB	
M437	Wentan Rd. Depot	Minle Metro Station	2-7 RMB	
M444	Shenzhen Foreign Language School	Shatoujiao Bus Terminal	2 RMB	
M465	Yantian N. Bus Terminal	Wentan Rd. Depot	2 RMB	
M520	Wentan Rd. Depot	Futian Transport Hub	3 RMB	
