= Jiang Zemin (documentary) =

2026 Chinese television documentary

- 江泽民
- Genre: Historical
- Based on: Jiang Zemin
- Country of origin: China
- Original language: Mandarin
- No. of episodes: 12

Production
- Production companies: Publicity Department of the Chinese Communist Party; Institute of Party History and Literature; National Radio and Television Administration; China Media Group

Original release
- Network: CCTV-1; CCTV-10
- Release: 11 August – 16 August 2026

Jiang Zemin is a 2026 documentary focusing on the life and political experiences of Jiang Zemin, the core of the third generation of the central leadership of the Chinese Communist Party and general secretary of the CCP Central Committee from 1989 to 2002. The film was jointly produced by the Publicity Department of the CCP Central Committee, the Institute of Party History and Literature, the National Radio and Television Administration, and China Media Group to commemorate the 100th anniversary of Jiang Zemin's birth.

== Production and broadcasting ==
17 August 2026, marked the 100th anniversary of Jiang Zemin's birth. The China Central Television (CCTV) released a twelve-episode documentary series, Jiang Zemin, before the anniversary. According to the production company, the series comprehensively reviews Jiang Zemin's more than 70 years of revolutionary career. The documentary premiered on CCTV-1 at 8 p.m. on 11 August 2026, and was rebroadcast on CCTV-4 at 10 p.m. for six consecutive nights, with two episodes each night, and ended on 16 August.

== Episodes ==
The documentary narrates Jiang Zemin's personal experiences and his activities in the political, economic, social and defense affairs of the People's Republic of China in a chronological order.

No.	Title	Original release date
1	"风雨历练"	August 11, 2026
This episode recounts Jiang Zemin's life before the age of fifty. Jiang Zemin grew up in Yangzhou, Jiangsu Province. His sixth uncle, Jiang Shangqing, was a member of the Chinese Communist Party, and Jiang Zemin was politically influenced from a young age. After Jiang Shangqing was murdered by armed forces, Jiang Zemin's biological father, Jiang Shijun, adopted him. Jiang Zemin spent his secondary school years in Yangzhou during the Japanese occupation, frequently visiting the Shi Gong Temple. While studying at Nanjing National Central University, he read extensively and organized anti-drug movements. He joined the Chinese Communist Party in April 1946 and, before the liberation of Shanghai, sheltered underground party members during their transfer. After the founding of the People's Republic of China, he worked at the Shanghai Yimin Food Factory, participating in the launch of the "Guangming" brand cold drinks. In early 1950, he married Wang Yeping. In 1955, he went to the Stalin Automobile Plant in the Soviet Union for an internship. After returning to China, he worked at the Changchun First Automobile Works, leading employees in completing the coal-to-oil conversion project. In 1962, he was transferred to the Shanghai Electrical Science Research Institute as deputy director, and in May 1966, he was transferred to the Wuhan Thermal Machinery Research Institute as director. After the outbreak of the Cultural Revolution, he was once assigned to clean toilets, during which time he organized three foreign language classes. At the end of 1970, he was transferred to the Foreign Affairs Bureau of the First Ministry of Machine Building and later went to Romania to participate in aid construction work.
2	"勇于探索"	August 11, 2026
This episode recounts Jiang Zemin's experiences in the early stages of the reform and opening up, the development of the electronics industry, and his time as the top official in Shanghai. In 1980, Jiang Zemin joined the State Council's Import and Export Management Commission and the Foreign Investment Management Commission (referred to as the "two commissions"), participating in the investigation and preparation work related to special economic zones, and contributing to the passage of the "Regulations on Special Economic Zones in Guangdong Province" by the Standing Committee of the National People's Congress. In 1983, he became Minister of the Ministry of Electronics Industry, proposing that "without the electronics industry, there would be no Four Modernizations." In June 1985, he was transferred to the position of Deputy Secretary of the Shanghai Municipal Committee, and in July, he became Mayor of Shanghai. During his tenure, he was involved in urban master planning, financial reform, and practical work for the citizens. The nation's first securities trading counter was also established in Shanghai. In November 1987, he was elected a member of the Politburo at the First Plenary Session, and in the same month, he became Secretary of the Shanghai Municipal Committee of the CCP. The episode also recounts his support for the development and opening up of Pudong.
3	"临危受命"	August 12, 2026
This episode recounts Jiang Zemin's rise from Shanghai to the leadership of the Central Committee of the Chinese Communist Party around 1989 and his early tenure. During the Tiananmen Square protests of 1989, the Shanghai Municipal Committee decided to suspend and rectify the publication of the World Economic Herald, drawing attention to Jiang Zemin. In June of the same year, Jiang Zemin was elected General Secretary of the CCP Central Committee at the Fourth Plenary Session Central Committee, quoting Lin Zexu's poem, "If it benefits the country, I will risk my life; how can I avoid it because of personal fortune or misfortune?" In the early years of his term, the Central Committee issued the "Seven Provisions" and addressed the domestic and international situation following the political turmoil, promoting improved relations with Western countries. In 1990, the State Council approved the development and opening up of Shanghai's Pudong New Area, and Beijing hosted the Asian Games that same year.
4	"重大突破"	August 12, 2026
This episode recounts China's economic system reforms and related policies in the 1990s. In November 1990, Jiang Zemin inspected Shenzhen and Zhuhai and discussed securities trading, subsequently leading to the establishment of the Shanghai Stock Exchange and the Shenzhen Stock Exchange. Following Deng Xiaoping's southern tour in 1992, Jiang Zemin chaired a plenary meeting of the Politburo, requiring the study and research of relevant speeches. The 14th National Congress of the Chinese Communist Party proposed establishing a socialist market economy. In response to the subsequent economic overheating, the central government began strengthening macroeconomic control in 1993. That same year, the episode describes the process of formulating the tax-sharing reform, with a working group led by Zhu Rongji, then a member of the Standing Committee of the Politburo and Vice Premier of the State Council, conducting research in multiple provinces and cities. The tax-sharing system was implemented in 1994. During his tenure, Jiang Zemin also inspected several state-owned enterprises; the 15th National Congress of the Chinese Communist Party in 1997 proposed a basic economic system with public ownership as the mainstay and the common development of diverse forms of ownership, and put forward development goals related to the Two Centenaries.
5	"兴国方略"	August 13, 2026
This episode revolves around strategies such as invigorating the nation through science and education, major engineering projects, regional development, and opening up to the outside world. It covers the first major railway speed increase in China in 1997 and subsequent railway construction, the implementation of the strategy of revitalizing the nation through science and education, the launch of the China Manned Space Program and the Shenzhou spacecraft, and higher education and scientific research initiatives such as Project 211. Regarding sustainable development, it touches on China's Agenda 21 and the South–North Water Transfer Project; regarding regional development, it discusses the China Western Development and the construction of the Qinghai–Tibet railway; and regarding opening up to the outside world, it covers the Go Out policy proposed in 1999 and China's accession to the World Trade Organization in 2001.
6	"统筹全局"	August 13, 2026
This episode focuses on the rule of law, political system, cultural development, ethnic groups, and religion. From December 1994 to July 2001, Jiang Zemin presided over several lectures on law by the Central Committee of the Chinese Communist Party; the 15th National Congress of the Chinese Communist Party established the basic strategy of governing the country according to law, which was enshrined in the Constitution in 1999. The episode also touches on the system of multi-party cooperation and political consultation under the leadership of the Chinese Communist Party, the construction of socialist spiritual civilization, and the relationship between the rule of law and the rule of virtue. In terms of culture, the episode showcases Jiang Zemin's cultural interests through excerpts such as reciting the Tengwang Ge Xu, singing the Peking Opera "Catching and Releasing Cao Cao", and performing the Italian song "'O sole mio", and discusses the development of news media and radio and television. Furthermore, this episode also covers the development of ethnic minority areas such as Tibet and Xinjiang, anti-separatist work, the reincarnation of the Panchen Lama, and religious affairs.
7	"风云本色"	August 14, 2026
This episode recounts the reform of state-owned enterprises and Jiang Zemin's responses to several major events during his tenure. Around 1997, the episode covers the Asian financial crisis and financial system reform, as well as measures such as deepening state-owned enterprise reform and implementing a policy of "grasping large enterprises and letting go of small ones." In 1998, the episode covers the massive floods in the Yangtze River basin and flood control efforts. In 1999, the episode recounts the April 25th petition incident and the subsequent suppression of Falun Gong, and also touches upon the US bombing of the Chinese embassy in Yugoslavia.
8	"精兵新篇"	August 14, 2026
This episode focuses on national defense and military development. In November 1989, the Fifth Plenary Session of the 13th CCP Central Committee decided that Jiang Zemin would serve as Chairman of the Central Military Commission. In 1990, Jiang Zemin put forward the general requirements for the development of the People's Liberation Army in the new era: "politically qualified, militarily competent, with excellent work style, strict discipline, and strong logistical support." After the Gulf War, the episode recounts his assessment of the characteristics of modern warfare and his propositions on developing national defense science and technology and promoting the modernization of the military. In 1998, Jiang Zemin demanded that the military cease all commercial activities. In September 2004, Jiang Zemin resigned as Chairman of the Central Military Commission at the Fourth Plenary Session Central Committee, and Hu Jintao succeeded him.
9	"九州方圆"	August 15, 2026
This episode covers Hong Kong, Macau, and Taiwan affairs. After Hong Kong entered the post-transition period before its return to China, the episode touches on the disagreements between China and the United Kingdom regarding direct elections in the Hong Kong Legislative Council, the construction of the new airport, and Chris Patten's political reform proposal. It also recounts the establishment of the Preliminary Working Committee of the Preparatory Committee for the Hong Kong Special Administrative Region and the Preparatory Committee itself, as well as Hong Kong's return to China in 1997 and Macau's return in 1999. Regarding Taiwan affairs, the episode covers the 1992 Consensus reached between the Association for Relations Across the Taiwan Straits (ARATS) and the Straits Exchange Foundation (SEF) in 1992, the Wang–Koo summit in 1993, Jiang Zemin's eight-point proposal for developing cross-strait relations in 1995, the military exercises in the Taiwan Strait from 1995 to 1996, and the response to Lee Teng-hui's "two-state theory" in 1999. The episode also discusses the development of Hong Kong and Macau after their return to China, and the mainland's continued pursuit of peaceful reunification while maintaining its stance of "not renunciation of the use of force" towards Taiwan.
10	"五洲际会"	August 15, 2026
This episode focuses on foreign affairs during Jiang Zemin's tenure. Jiang took office against the backdrop of the dramatic changes in Eastern Europe and the collapse of the Soviet Union. The episode discusses China's diplomatic stance against hegemonism and its disagreements with Western countries on human rights issues. Regarding relations with major powers, it focuses on China-United States and China-Russia relations, with the Sino-US section also touching on the September 11 attacks. China completed border negotiations with some post-Soviet countries and participated in the establishment of the Shanghai Cooperation Organisation. The episode also describes Jiang's "humane style" in dealing with European countries such as France and Germany. In terms of peripheral diplomacy, it covers responses to the "China threat theory" and relations with the Association of Southeast Asian Nations (ASEAN), India, Nepal, North Korea, South Korea, and Japan. Regarding relations with developing countries, it covers Brazil and African countries; in multilateral diplomacy, it covers the United Nations, the Forum on China–Africa Cooperation, the Boao Forum for Asia, and the 2001 APEC Summit in China.
11	"人民情怀"	August 16, 2026
This episode recounts Jiang Zemin's activities during his tenure, focusing on issues related to people's livelihood, poverty alleviation, social security, and research. Since 1989, Jiang Zemin inspected various parts of the country nearly 150 times. Regarding rural issues, the episode describes his visit to a farmer's family in Zhongxiang, Hubei Province in December 1992, receiving the UN Food and Agriculture Organization Farmers' Medal in 1998, and achieving a moderately prosperous society for farmers by 2002. On poverty alleviation, it covers his inspection of Yongchang Village in Baise, Guangxi Zhuang Autonomous Region in 1990, the implementation of the National 87 Poverty Alleviation Plan in 1994, and his inspection of impoverished counties and cities along the Beijing–Kowloon railway in 1996; during his tenure, the number of people living in poverty decreased by 75 million, and the 16th National Congress of the Chinese Communist Party proposed a higher goal of building a moderately prosperous society. The episode also covers the resettlement of laid-off workers from state-owned enterprises, the gradual establishment of a social security system, and Jiang Zemin's visits to disaster-stricken areas and workers in difficult conditions. Regarding research, it includes his 1992 directive to open the Qamdo Bamda Airport in Tibet. In addition, this episode also touches on the fight against corruption and malpractices, as well as segments of Jiang Zemin playing the erhu and singing Peking opera among the masses.
12	"大道行歌"	August 16, 2026
This episode summarizes Jiang Zemin's historical achievements. Faced with the dramatic changes in the international political and economic landscape, including the collapse of the Soviet Union and Eastern Europe, economic globalization, and the Third Technological Revolution, the episode recounts how he proposed "keeping pace with the times," further promoting the Sinicization of Marxism and successfully propelling socialism with Chinese characteristics into the 21st century. In 2000, during an inspection tour of Guangdong, Jiang Zemin put forward the Theory of Three Represents, which he comprehensively and systematically expounded at the 80th anniversary of the founding of the Chinese Communist Party. After the 16th National Congress of the Chinese Communist Party in 2002, he stepped down as General Secretary of the CCP Central Committee, succeeded by Hu Jintao. After retiring in 2004, he remained concerned about the Party and the country, publishing works such as Selected Works of Jiang Zemin, On the Development of China's Information Technology Industry, and Reflections on Energy Issues in China. Jiang Zemin passed away on 30 November 2022.

== Historical materials and presentation methods ==
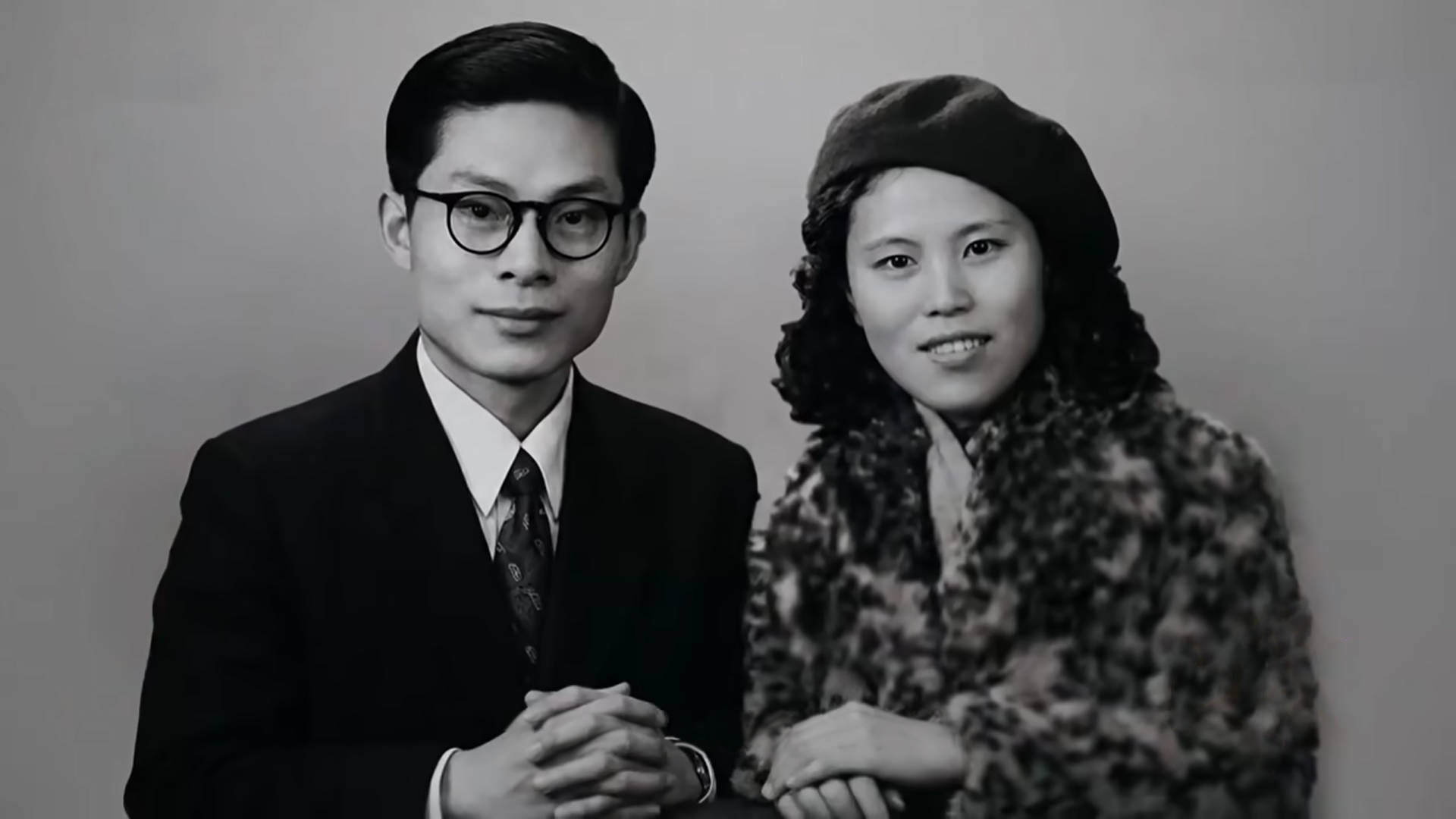
Newlywed photo of Jiang Zemin and his wife Wang Yeping released in the documentary, marking it the first time the photo gets unearthed

The documentary uses historical photos, video footage, and interviews recorded at different times, and discloses some previously unpublished personal materials. According to Lianhe Zaobao, the first two episodes revealed for the first time the wedding photos of Jiang Zemin and his wife Wang Yeping taken in the early 1950s; one of the parties involved in the film also recalled that in 1948, Jiang Zemin disguised himself, wore an American military uniform, and drove a jeep to cover a group of underground members of the Chinese Communist Party as they evacuated from Shanghai.

The film also uses previously recorded interview materials and includes more recent interviews. Episode 4, "Major Breakthrough", broadcasts footage of Zhu Rongji's 2008 interview and includes an interview with Guo Shuqing marked as being conducted in 2026. Episode 5, "Strategies for National Rejuvenation", tells the story of the negotiations between China and the United States before China's accession to the World Trade Organization, and uses an interview recorded in 2007 between Shi Guangsheng, then Minister of Foreign Trade and Economic Cooperation, and Zhu Rongji, in which the two recall the process of the China-US WTO negotiations in 1999. Episode 7, "True Colors of the Storm", in narrating the appeal of Falun Gong practitioners near Zhongnanhai in 1999 and the subsequent handling of the Falun Gong issue by the Chinese government, also quotes an interview with Wang Maolin, former director of the State Council's Office for Preventing and Handling Cult Issues, in 2007.

Regarding the presentation of historical events in images, Lianhe Zaobao noted that the documentary Deng Xiaoping, which aired in 1997, showed footage of Tiananmen Square during the 1989 Tiananmen protests, while the third episode of Jiang Zemin, titled "Taking on a Critical Mission," did not use such footage when narrating the "political turmoil" of 1989, but instead presented empty shots of Tiananmen Square. The newspaper quoted Wang Shengyu, a research assistant at the Center for China Analysis at the Asia Society Policy Institute, as saying that such documentaries have historical value; for scholars studying the history of the Chinese Communist Party, the materials disclosed in them can constitute new historical materials.

== Analysis ==
The documentary was part of a series of official Chinese events commemorating the 100th anniversary of Jiang Zemin's birth. CCTV-1 broadcast two episodes every night during prime time starting 11 August. Lianhe Zaobao reported before the program's premiere that CCTV's program schedule showed that the documentary would be broadcast two episodes every night from 11 to 16 August. Taiwan's Central News Agency also reported on the broadcast of the documentary in the context of the 100th anniversary of Jiang Zemin's birth, noting that the program was broadcast for six consecutive nights, with two episodes per day.

After the broadcast of the third episode, "Taking on a Critical Mission," both Lianhe Zaobao and the Central News Agency reported on the documentary's narrative of the 1989 political events and the turning point in Jiang Zemin's political career, from Shanghai Party Secretary to General Secretary of the CCP Central Committee. Lianhe Zaobao pointed out that the episode described Jiang Zemin's appointment as General Secretary of the CCP Central Committee as "Taking on a Critical Mission at a Critical Moment for the Party and the Country," and reported on the documentary's presentation of the suspension and rectification of the World Economic Herald and the 1989 political turmoil. The Central News Agency also subsequently reported on this episode under the title "Jiang Zemin's Documentary Depicts June Fourth and Describes'Taking on a Critical Mission' in 1989," and quoted the relevant narrative in the film about the turning point in Jiang Zemin's political career. As subsequent episodes aired, Lianhe Zaobao reported on the fifth episode, "Strategies for National Rejuvenation," which recounted the 1999 US-China WTO negotiations, and the seventh episode, "True Colors of the Storm," which presented the 1999 Falun Gong incident and the Chinese government's subsequent handling of it.

Lianhe Zaobao also noted that several personal experiences and historical details revealed in the documentary sparked discussions on the Chinese internet, with many people expressing nostalgia for the elder. The newspaper stated that classic images and quotes from Jiang Zemin's past are widely circulated on the Chinese internet and have formed related memes, thus attracting many netizens who refer to him as the "elder" to watch the film.
