= Travel Frog =

2017 video game

- Developer: Hit-Point
- Publisher: Hit-Point
- Platforms: iOS, Android
- Release: WW: 24 November 2017
- Genres: Virtual pet, incremental game
- Mode: Single-player

Travel Frog (旅かえる, Tabikaeru) is a free-to-play mobile game developed by Hit-Point Co., Ltd that operates in Nagoya, Kyoto, released on 24 November 2017 for iOS and Android devices.

Similar to the mobile game Neko Atsume developed by the same company, Travel Frog is a low-pressure, non-competitive game with carefully designed graphics. The only thing players have control over in the game is the preparation work of the frog's travel. The frog spends time at home studying and playing, and when it decides to travel, it can be away for up to four days, during which the players will not be able to interact with the frog. As in Neko Atsume, in order to prevent advertisements from interfering with the progress of the game, the advertisements are delivered to the player's mailbox, making them separate from the game content, and displaying them at the player's discretion.

== Gameplay ==
The player prepares the frog (named by the player) for its journey and sends it off on its way. The frog returns from a trip that lasts from a few hours to a few days, and brings back with it local specialties from its destination, as well as photos of its memories of the trip, which the player can view. The player cannot interact with the frog during its journey, but only waits for its return.

In the game, clover acts as currency and is needed to purchase food and equipment from the store to prepare the frog for its trip. The clover grows in the garden and can be harvested by tapping on it. Clover can also be purchased for a fee or obtained without paying, brought back by the frog from its travels, or given to the player by the frog's friends through flyers (advertisements).

Settings include the volume of the background music and sound effects, and the turning on/off of the notifications.

== Development ==
The game, based on the motif of a "traveling frog," was planned and developed by a small team as a follow-up to Hit-Point's flagship app, Neko Atsume. The title of this game is a combination of the words "journey" (旅, Tabi) and "frog" (カエル, Kaeru), and the word "kaeru" is similar to the word "return" (from a journey) (帰る, Kaeru).

During the development of the game, a number of mechanics were implemented to make people want to post about the game on social media. First, to make it easier for players to post and talk about the frog's trips on social networking sites, a function that allows players to post screenshots directly from within the game was created, along with a system that allows each player to have slightly different pictures sent by the frog even from the same destination. In addition, the character of the frog and its destinations were not made clear, leaving room for the imagination. Although the frog sends photos and souvenirs to the players, it does not share its memories of the trip, so the aim was to share what they noticed from the photos among the users to create a community topic. For the same reason, the descriptions of items in the store are limited to hints rather than specific information. On the other hand, the routes of the frog's journeys were made realistic, and the destinations and items were selected by comparing them to an actual map.

== Performance in the Chinese market ==
Travel Frog was No.1 in the free game category on the Chinese app store for more than two weeks in January 2018, even though the Chinese translation was not even available yet and the game was presented in Japanese. There were also comments connecting the popularity of the game with the "toad worship" culture.

On April 2, 2018, Alibaba Group announced that it had cooperated with Hit-Point Co., Ltd and obtained an authorized agent to issue the official Chinese version of "Traveling Frog", and will launch Chinese-style game content. The Chinese version of the frog eating steamed buns is going online.

== See also ==
- Neko Atsume
