= Usagi Shima =

2023 video game

- Developer: Jess Yu
- Publisher: Jess Yu
- Designer: Jess Yu
- Composers: Shiomi Shino; Mos; Max Duggan
- Engine: Godot
- Platforms: Android; iOS; 1 September 2023
- Genre: Virtual pet
- Mode: Single-player

Usagi Shima (うさぎしま, Rabbit Island) is a free-to-play 2023 mobile rabbit-collecting game developed by Jess Yu (pank0). The game is developed using the Godot engine, with gameplay inspired by Neko Atsume. The player builds up a selection of toys and structures in the game to attract rabbits to a tropical island. It was released on September 1, 2023 for iOS and Android and has received several updates since then, and was subsequently released on Steam on October 29, 2026.

== Gameplay ==
Part of a developed island with many rabbit inhabitants

Set on an abandoned tropical island, players buy items and buildings from the store to decorate the island, which attracts various rabbits.

There are two currencies used to expand the island and buy toys and structures, both of which can be purchased through microtransactions: carrots, which are earned quickly from visiting rabbits by performing tasks for them or as tips; and gold carrots, a premium currency that is earned more slowly. The player can buy more island space using the premium in-game currency, gold carrots, or via in-app purchase. Buying the Beach Expansion gives more land space and unlocks more items in the shop. Buying the Ocean Expansion allows players to place specific items in the ocean.

Players can interact with the rabbits on the island through petting, brushing, feeding, and taking photos, which are collected in a photo album. A 2024 update added an endless runner minigame as an option for rabbit interaction.

=== Rabbits ===
As of version 1.5.15, there are 35 rabbits for the player to collect. Among these, 13 are considered to be "special rabbits" and only start to appear on the island when certain items are placed on the island or achievements are met. Each rabbit has a unique name, personality, and appearance (e.g. Yuzu who is based on the Yuzu fruit), and prefers specific items. Eventually, a hatmaker vendor, Mako, appears, offering hats to be worn by the rabbits.

== Development ==
Usagi Shima is developed using the Godot engine, and started development in February 2021, with a gameplay trailer appearing in the Wholesome Direct stream of June 2022. The game draws inspiration from Ōkunoshima in Hiroshima Prefecture, Japan, an island inhabited by hundreds of feral rabbits. Its graphics were created using Krita. Shortly after its appearance in Wholesome Direct 2023, the game was released in September 2023. The game also appeared at Tokyo Game Show 2023 under the Selected Indie 80 category. The developer Jess Yu was inspired by Neko Atsume, a cat-collecting mobile game. The game was released through Steam on October 29, 2026.

== Reception ==
Usagi Shima has been positively received. Catherine Dellosa, writing for Pocket Gamer, reviewed the game favorably, praising its visual style and low-pressure gameplay, and awarded it a perfect score. Reviewers Giulia Martino and Jenni Lada, writing for Multiplayer.it and Siliconera, respectively, gave the game somewhat less favorable reviews, the former noting a lack of variety in music and the latter appreciating the improved interactivity compared to Neko Atsume, but not scoring it quite as high. The game was a finalist in the 2023 Pocket Gamer Awards in the Best Mobile Family Game category, losing to Niantic's Peridot.
