= List of awards and honours received by Jiang Zemin =

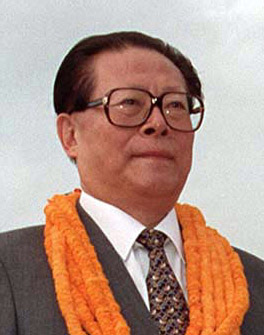
Jiang Zemin in 1997

Jiang Zemin served as the general secretary of the Chinese Communist Party (CCP) from 1989 to 2002, as chairman of the Central Military Commission from 1989 to 2004, and as president of China from 1993 to 2003. He has received multiple honours and recognition from several countries.

== State Honours ==
Decoration	Country	Date	Note	Ref.
Order of José Martí	Cuba	21 November 1993	Order of Cuba	
Grand Cross of the Order of the Southern Cross	Brazil	23 November 1993	Brazilian order of chivalry	
First Class of the Order of Prince Yaroslav the Wise	Ukraine	2 December 1995	Award of Ukraine	
Grand Cross of the National Order of Mali	Mali	17 May 1996	The highest honorific order of Mali	
Order of the Great Star of Djibouti	Djibouti	18 August 1998	Order of Djibouti	
Grand Cross of the Order of Good Hope	South Africa	5 May 1999	Order of merit of South Africa	
Order of the Golden Eagle	Kazakhstan	19 November 1999	The highest order of Kazakhstan	
Grand Cross of the Order of Merit	Republic of the Congo	20 March 2000	Order of the Republic of Congo	
Medal 'Bethlehem 2000'	Palestine	15 April 2000	Medal of the State of Palestine	
First Class of the Order of the State of Republic of Turkey	Turkey	19 April 2000	The highest state order awarded to foreigners	
Grand Cross of the Order of the Redeemer	Greece	22 April 2000	Highest decoration of Greece	
Athens Gold Medal	Greece	22 April 2000	Medal of Athens	
Royal Family Order of the Crown of Brunei	Brunei	17 November 2000	Order of Brunei	
Grand Cross of the Order of Tahiti Nui	French Polynesia	3 April 2001	Order of French Polynesia	
Grand Cordon of the Order of the Liberator	Venezuela	16 April 2001	The highest order of Venezuela	
Medal of Pushkin	Russia	31 October 2007	State decoration of Russia	
