= Jiang Zemin Hong Kong journalist incident =

2000 political incident

On 27 October 2000, Hong Kong news reporter Sharon Cheung asked Jiang Zemin about his support for then-Chief Executive of Hong Kong, Tung Chee-hwa, who would have been due for re-election in 2002. During Cheung's questioning, Jiang rebuked Cheung for approximately five minutes, calling the Hong Kong mass media "too young," "too simple," and "sometimes naive." The viral video of the press conference has since become a meme in China. Tung was eventually re-elected for a second term.

== Background ==
On 26 January 1996, the Preparatory Committee for the Hong Kong Special Administrative Region was established in Beijing. Jiang Zemin, then General Secretary of the Chinese Communist Party, walked through a crowd of over 150 committee members and shook hands with only Tung Chee-hwa, a gesture interpreted as an 'imperial endorsement', signalling to British and Hong Kong political and media circles that Jiang favoured Tung as the chief executive for the election held that December, which Tung eventually won.

By the year 2000, the political landscape in Hong Kong had shifted unfavorably for Tung, with his popularity steadily declining and opposition growing increasingly vocal.

In October 2000, Tung travelled to Beijing. From the 26th to 27th, the Central Committee of the Chinese Communist Party convened three press conferences at the Great Hall of the People shortly after the conclusion of the 15th Central Committee of the Chinese Communist Party. On 26 October, Qian Qichen, Vice Premier of China, held the first press conference. During this session, a Hong Kong journalist inquired whether the central authorities supported Tung's re-election. Qian Qichen responded affirmatively. Numerous Hong Kong newspapers ran headlines the following day declaring that the Chinese central leadership had endorsed Tung.

== Press conference ==
On the afternoon of 27 October 2000, Jiang Zemin convened his third press conference. At that time, a total of eight to ten organizations were permitted to enter and pose questions, including Hong Kong Cable Television, the Wen Wei Po, the Ta Kung Pao, and the Sing Pao.

Cheung first inquired about Jiang's stance towards Tung, to which he responded in Cantonese that he supported his re-election. Subsequently, Cheung pressed Jiang on the European Parliament report and Chris Patten's assessment of Hong Kong's prevailing situation, which alleged that Beijing authorities were undermining Hong Kong's rule of law and interfering with Hong Kong's elections. Jiang became particularly incensed when Cheung asked if Tung had been handpicked or chosen by imperial decree. He spent approximately three to five minutes rebuking Cheung for her "ignorance", pacing back and forth between his seat and the press gallery several times. He stated that the next Chief Executive was to be selected in accordance with the Basic Law of Hong Kong, clarifying that he had not personally endorsed Tung but merely supported him.

You mass-media people still have a lot to learn. You're so familiar with Western values, but at the end of the day, you are still too young. You understand what I mean? Let me say this: I've been through hundreds of battles. I've seen it all! Which country in the West have I not been to? You people in the media should know America's Mike Wallace. He's so far ahead of you people I can't even see him! Hey, I talked and laughed with him! That's why when I talk about the media... you still need to raise your level of knowledge! You know what I mean? Got it? I'm worried for you all, truly. You people today, I would have expected... Everywhere you go... You guys are good at one thing: Running all over the world, you run faster than those Western journalists. Nonetheless, you ask questions here and there, and they're all too simple, sometimes naïve. Understand yet?

— Jiang Zemin

During his tirade, Jiang attacked Hong Kong journalists, who he stated, in English, were "too young" and "sometimes naive". At the end of his remarks, he told the journalists that he was speaking to them in the capacity of an "elder" and felt the need to "impart some life experience" to them, also warning them that the journalists would bear responsibility for the reporting of false information.

Staff began to escort the journalists out of the room at the end of Jiang's rebuke, at which point he said, in English, "I'm angry!".

== Commentary ==
=== Academic ===
Liu Zhaojia, deputy director of the CUHK Asia-Pacific Institute, contends that as the journalist's questions were excessively pointed, and Jiang Zemin could not publicly criticise Qian Qichen for supporting Tung Chee-hwa's re-election, he was compelled to rebuke the reporter.

=== Media ===
Jiang's rebuke of journalists drew widespread attention from international and Hong Kong media. Opinions differ as to why Jiang Zemin lashed out at the Hong Kong journalists. Some believe he acted impulsively in the heat of the moment, while others maintain his rebuke was deliberate and calculated.

== See also ==
- Moha (meme), an internet meme spoofing Jiang
