= Reflections on Energy Issues in China =

Paper published by Jiang Zemin

"Reflections on Energy Issues in China" (Chinese: 《对中国能源问题的思考》) is a paper published by Jiang Zemin, former general secretary of the Chinese Communist Party, in 2008. The paper was published in both Chinese and English in the Journal of Shanghai Jiao Tong University. The paper is included in Jiang Zemin's collection of essays, Research on China's Energy Issues.

== Background ==
At the end of 2007, it was the 60th anniversary of Jiang Zemin's graduation from Shanghai Jiao Tong University. Shanghai Jiao Tong University asked Jiang Zemin to write an article as a gift for the 112th anniversary of the university. Afterwards, Jiang Zemin consulted relevant information and consulted relevant experts. Ma Fucai, Ning Jizhe, Zhou Dadi, Han Wenke and others also helped Jiang Zemin collect data. Jiang Zemin personally wrote the paper and English abstract. On February 28, 2008, Jiang Zemin submitted the paper to the editorial department of the Journal of Shanghai Jiao Tong University. The paper went through internal and external review. The editorial department revised the manuscript five or six times, with a total of 16 revised manuscripts. The editorial department and Jiang Zemin went back and forth several times, and a large number of formatting issues were corrected. The paper was published in the Journal of Shanghai Jiao Tong University (Natural Science Edition) and the Journal of Shanghai Jiao Tong University (English Edition) 2008 No. 3.

== Content ==
The paper expounds on the importance of energy security, explores the opportunities and challenges of China's energy development, and discusses the strategic thinking of China's energy development. It believes that China should focus on energy conservation and consumption reduction based on coal, while developing carbon-free, low-carbon and renewable energy. The paper also discusses issues such as energy tax, energy price and energy development prospects.

== Follow-up ==
On April 23, 2009, Jiang Zemin presented this paper during his visit to China United Engineering Corporation.

== Reactions ==
Chen Yong, an academician of the Chinese Academy of Engineering, commented that Jiang Zemin's new identity will bring him a new perspective when thinking about China's energy problems, which is also a sign of the increasing attention paid to China's energy problems.

Ma Dexiu, Party Secretary of Shanghai Jiao Tong University, commented that the paper is an important document that systematically and comprehensively expounds on China's energy issues with a broad perspective, rich content, insightful arguments.

Professor Yu Li of China University of Mining and Technology believes that the paper does not mention underground coal gasification technology, which is a shortcoming. Shen Yongyan, former deputy director of Changchun FAW, believes that the last part of the paper is slightly insufficient and should have more operational policy opinions.

The Ministry of Science and Technology, the National Energy Administration and other departments discussed this paper.

Regarding Jiang Zemin's publication of the paper, Southern Weekend reported that some scholars believe that outgoing leaders should be given more space in social public affairs and academic research.
