= Three-step development strategy for modernizing national defense and armed forces =

Chinese Communist Party strategy

The "three-step" strategy for the modernization of national defense and the armed forces is a development strategy for the modernization of national defense and the armed forces of the People's Republic of China, proposed by Jiang Zemin in 1997.

== History ==
=== Jiang Zemin ===
On 7 December 1997, Chinese Communist Party (CCP) general secretary and Central Military Commission (CMC) chairman Jiang Zemin proposed in Strategic Goals for Realizing the Trans-Century Development of National Defense and Military Modernization that, in line with the development process of modernization of the People's Republic of China, the trans-century development of national defense and military modernization can also be roughly divided into "three steps":

1. From now until 2010, we will strive to achieve all the requirements put forward by the military strategic guidelines for the new era, and lay a solid foundation for the modernization of national defense and the armed forces.
2. In the second decade of the 21st century, with the growth of the country's economic strength and the corresponding increase in military spending, we will accelerate the pace of quality building of our military, appropriately increase the development of high-tech weapons and equipment, improve the weapons and equipment system, comprehensively improve the quality of the troops, further optimize the organizational structure, and make significant progress in the modernization of national defense and the armed forces.
3. After another thirty years of effort, by the middle of the 21st century, we will achieve the modernization of national defense and the armed forces.

Jiang Zemin also stated out that "the key to achieving the strategic goal of modernizing national defense and the military in three steps lies in the first step. In the past ten years or so, we must maintain a certain pace of development, narrow the gap between us and the world's major military powers, accumulate strength, and prepare for future development. We must plan the modernization of the military before 2010 based on the Outline of the Ninth Five-Year Plan for Military Construction."

=== Hu Jintao ===
On 29 December 2006, the State Council Information Office issued a white paper entitled China's National Defense in 2006. According to the overall plan of the country, the modernization of national defense and the armed forces would be carried out in a "three-step" development strategy. A solid foundation would be laid before 2010, and significant progress would be made around 2020. By the middle of the 21st century, the strategic goal of "building an informationized army and winning informationized wars" would be basically achieved.

In November 2012, CCP general secretary Hu Jintao emphasized in his report to the 18th CCP National Congress that "building a solid national defense and a powerful army commensurate with China’s international status and adapted to the interests of national security and development is a strategic task of China’s modernization. We must adhere to the core security needs of the country as the guide, coordinate economic construction and national defense construction, and accelerate the completion of the dual historical tasks of mechanization and informatization in accordance with the three-step strategic concept of national defense and military modernization. We must strive to basically achieve mechanization and make significant progress in informatization by 2020."

=== Xi Jinping ===
On 13 March 2016, CCP general secretary Xi Jinping said at the plenary meeting of the delegation of the People's Liberation Army to the fourth session of the 12th National People's Congress that "the '13th Five-Year Plan' period is the decisive stage for building a moderately prosperous society in all respects, and it is also a key period for national defense and military construction. The entire army and armed police force should fully implement the spirit of the 18th CCP National Congress and the third, fourth and fifth plenary sessions of the 18th CCP Central Committee, take Deng Xiaoping Theory, the important thought of 'Three Represents' and the Scientific Outlook on Development as guidance, follow the requirements of the 'Four Comprehensives' strategic layout, thoroughly implement the new development concept, take the Party's goal of building a strong army under the new situation as the guide, implement the military strategic policy under the new situation, promote political building of the army, reform and strengthening of the army, and rule of law in the army, strengthen the construction of the army and preparation for military struggle, and ensure the timely realization of the second step of the 'three-step' development strategy for the modernization of national defense and the army." He also emphasized the role of innovation.

In his report to the 19th CCP National Congress in 2017, Xi Jinping put forward a new "three-step" strategy for national defense and military building in the new era. This strategy advances the timeline for achieving the original "three-step" strategic goals by 15 years. The specific content is:

1. By 2027, we will achieve the centenary goal of the People's Liberation Army.
2. By 2035, the modernization of national defense and the armed forces will be basically realized.
3. By the mid-21st century, a world-class military modernization will be fully established.
