= Jiang Zemin =

Leader of China from 1989 to 2002

- Jiang in 2002

General Secretary of the Chinese Communist Party
- In office 24 June 1989 – 15 November 2002
- Preceded by: Zhao Ziyang
- Succeeded by: Hu Jintao

President of China
- In office 27 March 1993 – 15 March 2003
- Premier: Li Peng; Zhu Rongji
- Vice President: Rong Yiren; Hu Jintao
- Preceded by: Yang Shangkun
- Succeeded by: Hu Jintao

Chairman of the Central Military Commission
- In office: Party Commission: 9 November 1989 – 19 September 2004; State Commission: 19 March 1990 – 8 March 2005
- Deputy: See list: Cao Gangchuan (2002–2005); Guo Boxiong (2002–2005) Hu Jintao (1999–2004); Chi Haotian (1995–2003); Zhang Wannian (1995–2003); Liu Huaqing (1989–1998); Zhang Zhen (1992–1998); Yang Shangkun (1989–1993)
- Preceded by: Deng Xiaoping
- Succeeded by: Hu Jintao

Party Secretary of Shanghai
- In office 27 November 1987 – 1 August 1989
- Preceded by: Rui Xingwen
- Succeeded by: Zhu Rongji

Mayor of Shanghai
- In office 29 June 1985 – 22 December 1987
- Preceded by: Wang Daohan
- Succeeded by: Zhu Rongji

Minister of Electronics Industry
- In office 20 June 1983 – 14 June 1985
- Premier: Zhao Ziyang
- Preceded by: Zhang Ting
- Succeeded by: Li Tieying

Personal details
- Born: 17 August 1926 Yangzhou, Jiangsu Province, Republic of China
- Died: 30 November 2022 (aged 96) Jing'an District, Shanghai, People's Republic of China
- Party: Chinese Communist Party
- Spouse: Wang Yeping (m. 1949)
- Children: Jiang Mianheng; Jiang Miankan
- Education: National Central University (transferred); National Chiao Tung University (BS)
- Profession: Electrical engineer
- Awards: Full list
- Jiang's voice Jiang during a press conference with U.S. President Bill Clinton; Recorded 29 October 1997

Chinese name
- Simplified Chinese: 江泽民
- Traditional Chinese: 江澤民
Transcriptions
Standard Mandarin
- Hanyu Pinyin: Jiāng Zémín
- Wade–Giles: Chiang^{1} Tzê^{2}-min^{2}
- IPA: [tɕjáŋ tsɤ̌.mǐn]
Yue: Cantonese
- Yale Romanization: Gōng Jaahk-màahn
- Jyutping: Gong^{1} Zaak^{6}-maan^{4}
- IPA: [kɔŋ˥ tsak̚˨.man˩]
Southern Min
- Hokkien POJ: Kang Tik-bîn
- Central institution membership: 1989–2002: 13th, 14th, 15th Politburo Standing Committee; 1989–2005: 13th, 14th, 15th, 16th Central Military Commission; 1987–2002: 13th, 14th, 15th Politburo; 1983–2002: 12th, 13th, 14th, 15th Central Committee; 1988–2008: 7th, 8th, 9th, 10th, 11th National People's Congress; Other political offices held: 1987–89: Communist Party Committee Secretary, Shanghai; 1984–87: Mayor, Shanghai; 1983–85: Minister, Ministry of Electronic Industries; Paramount Leader of the People's Republic of China: ← Deng Xiaoping; Hu Jintao →

Jiang Zemin (Note: /dʒiːˈɑːŋ zəˈmɪn/; Chinese: 江泽民; pinyin: Jiāng Zémín, traditionally romanized as Chiang Tze-min) (17 August 1926 – 30 November 2022) was a Chinese politician who served as the general secretary of the Chinese Communist Party (CCP) and the fourth paramount leader of China from 1989 to 2002, as the chairman of the Central Military Commission from 1989 to 2004, and as the president of China from 1993 to 2003. He was the core leader of the third generation of Chinese leadership, one of four core leaders alongside Mao Zedong, Deng Xiaoping, and Xi Jinping.

Born in Yangzhou, Jiangsu, Jiang grew up during the years of Japanese occupation. After studying electrical engineering at the National Central University, he transferred to the National Chiao Tung University, joining the CCP while he was in college, and graduating in 1947. After the establishment of the People's Republic of China in 1949, he received training at the Stalin Automobile Works in Moscow in the 1950s, and later returned to Shanghai in 1962 to serve in various institutes before being sent between 1970 and 1972 to Romania as part of an expert team to establish machinery manufacturing plants in the country. After 1979, he was appointed as the vice chair of two commissions by vice premier Gu Mu to oversee the newly established special economic zones (SEZs). He became the vice minister of the newly established Ministry of Electronics Industry and a member of the CCP Central Committee in 1982. Jiang was appointed as the mayor of Shanghai in 1985, and was later promoted to its Communist Party secretary, as well as a member of the CCP Politburo, in 1987.

Jiang came to power unexpectedly as a compromise candidate following the 1989 Tiananmen Square protests and massacre, when he replaced Zhao Ziyang as CCP general secretary after Zhao was ousted for his support for the student movement. Jiang also assumed the chairmanship of the Central Military Commission from Deng Xiaoping. As the involvement of the Eight Elders in Chinese politics steadily declined, Jiang consolidated his hold on power to become the "paramount leader" and "core leader" in 1989. (Note: "Paramount leader" is not a formal title; it is a reference occasionally used by media outlets and scholars to refer to the foremost political leader in China at a given time. For example, there is no consensus on when Hu Jintao became the paramount leader (2002–2012), as Jiang held the most powerful office in the military (i.e., Central Military Commission chairman) and did not relinquish all positions until 2005 to his successor, while Hu was the General Secretary of the Communist Party since 2002 and President of China since 2003.) Urged by Deng Xiaoping's southern tour in 1992, Jiang officially introduced the term socialist market economy in his speech during the 14th CCP National Congress held later that year, which accelerated reform and opening up. In the economy, Jiang's administration oversaw the breaking of the iron rice bowl, started several key infrastructure projects and privatized many state-owned enterprises. Jiang prohibited the military engaging in business, proposed the revitalize the country through science and education policy, and started various projects including Project 211, and Project 985 to improve education. In 1999, Jiang started a crack down on Falun Gong. In foreign policy, Jiang oversaw closer relations with Russia, with a friendship treaty signed in 2001, as well as the founding of the Shanghai Cooperation Organisation. Relations with the United States were marked by tensions, due to the Third Taiwan Strait Crisis in 1996, the US bombing of the Chinese embassy in Belgrade in 1999 and the 2001 Hainan island incident.

Under Jiang's leadership, the CCP preserved its rule amidst the Revolutions of 1989 and China experienced substantial economic growth. The returning of Hong Kong from the United Kingdom in 1997 and of Macau from Portugal in 1999, and entry into the World Trade Organization in 2001, were landmark moments of his era. China also witnessed improved relations with the outside world, while the Communist Party maintained its tight control over the state. The Three Represents, Jiang's contributions to party doctrine, legitimized the entry of private business owners and bourgeois elements into the CCP, and was written into the CCP constitution in 2002. Jiang gradually vacated his official leadership titles from 2002 to 2005, being succeeded in these roles by Hu Jintao, although he and his political faction continued to influence affairs until much later. In 2022, Jiang died at the age of 96 in Shanghai; he was accorded a state funeral.

== Early life ==
Jiang Zemin was born in the city of Yangzhou, Jiangsu, on 17 August 1926. His ancestral home was the Jiangcun Village (江村) in Jingde County, Anhui. This was also the hometown of a number of prominent figures in Chinese academic and intellectual establishments. Jiang grew up during the years of Japanese occupation. His uncle and foster father, Jiang Shangqing, died fighting the Japanese and was considered in Jiang Zemin's time to be a national hero. After Shangqing's death, Zemin became his male heir. He attended the Yangzhou Middle School, which was deeply influenced by Western, particularly American, style curriculum; he later referred to this as the "bourgeois" stage of his education. He received English-language education in the school.

Jiang attended the Department of Electrical Engineering at the National Central University in Japanese-occupied Nanjing before transferring to National Chiao Tung University (now Shanghai Jiao Tong University). He graduated there in 1947 with a bachelor's degree in electrical engineering. Jiang joined the Chinese Communist Party when he was in college. After the establishment of the People's Republic of China, Jiang was assigned to the Shanghai No. 2 Design Bureau in 1952. In 1954, he was transferred to help design the five-year plan of the First Ministry of Machine Building; the transfer was arranged by vice minister Wang Daohan. Shortly after, he was assigned to the main vehicle production facility in Changchun.

In 1955, he started his training at the Stalin Automobile Works in Moscow. In the Soviet Union, he became proficient in Russian. He also consumed Russian literature and songs, became close to his Soviet counterparts, and developed a taste for vodka and singing Soviet revolutionary songs. After his education, Jiang worked for Changchun's First Automobile Works. As Jiang became increasingly involved in the Communist Party, his main work shifted from the technical side of engineering to administrative and political tasks.

== Early career ==
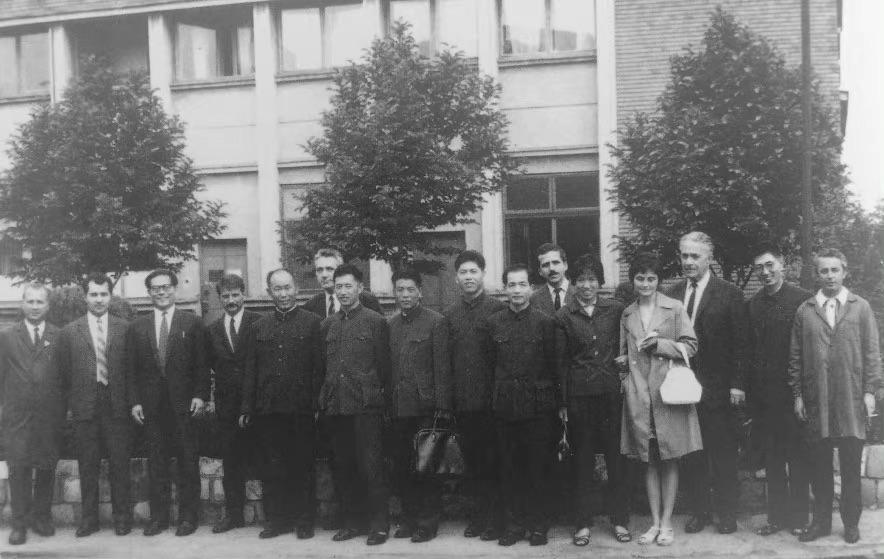
Chinese engineering expert team in Romania; Jiang is third from left. (1972)

In 1962, he returned to Shanghai and became the deputy director of the Shanghai Electric Research Institute, where he worked until 1965. In 1966, he was appointed as the director and deputy party secretary of a thermal engineering research institute in Wuhan, which was established by the First Ministry of Machine Building. When the Cultural Revolution began in the same year, he did not suffer greatly during the turmoil, but was removed from his position as director of the institute and was sent to a May Seventh Cadre School. In 1970, after leaving the cadre school, he became the deputy director of the Foreign Affairs Bureau of the ministry and was sent to the Romania, where he served as head of the expert team to establish fifteen machinery manufacturing plants in the country. After the completion of his mission in 1972, he returned to China.

In 1979, following a thawing of diplomatic relations between China and the United States, Deng Xiaoping decided to encourage special economic zones (SEZs) as part of his Four Modernizations. China's State Council established two ministerial commissions to increase trade and foreign investment. The commissions were headed by vice premier Gu Mu, who appointed Jiang as vice chairman of both commissions, a position equivalent to vice minister. Jiang's role was to ensure these SEZs increased economic prosperity without becoming "conduits" for foreign ideology. In 1980, Jiang headed a delegation which toured other SEZs in twelve countries; upon his return, he issued a radical report which recommended allowing local authorities to issue tax breaks and land leases, and increasing the power of foreign joint ventures. The report initially "caused consternation" among party leaders, but his pragmatic and empirical presentation appealed to Deng Xiaoping. His proposals were approved at the National People's Congress, cementing Jiang as an "early implementer" of Deng Xiaoping Theory.

In March 1982, he was pushed out as vice chairman of two commissions. After pressure from premier Gu and Shanghai mayor Wang Daohan, "ardent reformist" Zhao Ziyang appointed Jiang as the first vice minister and party secretary of the newly established Ministry of Electronics Industry. At the 12th Party Congress held in September 1982, Jiang was elected as a member of the CCP Central Committee, which determines policy and elects the members of the Politburo.

=== Shanghai ===
In 1985, a political reshuffle took place in Shanghai. Party Secretary Chen Guodong and Mayor Wang Daohan were both removed due to age issues. Instead, Rui Xingwen became the new Party Secretary of Shanghai, and Jiang became new mayor of Shanghai. Jiang received mixed reviews as mayor. Many of his critics dismissed him as a "flower pot", a Chinese term for someone who only seems useful, but actually gets nothing done. Many credited Shanghai's growth during the period to Zhu Rongji. Jiang was an ardent believer, during this period, in Deng Xiaoping's economic reforms. In an attempt to curb student discontent in 1986, Jiang recited the Gettysburg Address in English in front of a group of student protesters.

At the 13th National Congress of the CCP held in October 1987, Jiang was promoted from mayor to Shanghai party secretary, the most powerful position in the city, reporting directly to the central government. He also joined the Politburo of the Chinese Communist Party, in accordance with customs for party secretaries of major cities. In 1988, Jiang banned party and government organs from engaging in business activities.

==== 1989 Shanghai pro-democracy protests ====
In April 1989, former general secretary Hu Yaobang died; he had previously been forced to resign in January 1987 and accused of supporting "bourgeois liberalization". His death catalyzed the 1989 Tiananmen Square protests and massacre, leading to an ideological crisis between "liberals" (who supported aggressive reforms) and "conservatives" (who favored slower change). After the Shanghai-based World Economic Herald tried to publish a eulogy rehabilitating Hu and praising his reformist stance, Jiang took control of the newspaper's editorial board. As the protests continued to grow, the Party imposed martial law and deployed troops in Beijing in May. In Shanghai, 100,000 protestors marched in the streets, and 450 students went on a hunger strike. After the third day, Jiang personally met with them to assure them that the Party shared their goals, and to promise future dialogue. He simultaneously sent a telegram to the Central Committee firmly supporting their martial law declaration.

His careful public appeals were well received by both pro-democracy students and socialist party elders. On 20 May 1989, paramount leader Deng Xiaoping decided to appoint Jiang as the new general secretary, replacing Zhao Ziyang, who had supported the protestors. Jiang was selected as a compromise candidate over Tianjin's Li Ruihuan, premier Li Peng, elders Li Xiannian, Chen Yun, and the retired elders to become the new general secretary. Before that, he had been considered to be an unlikely candidate.

== Leadership ==
Jiang was appointed as general secretary at the fourth plenum of the 13th Central Committee on 24 June 1989 with a fairly small power base inside the party, and thus, very little actual power. His most reliable allies were the powerful party elders Chen Yun and Li Xiannian. He was believed to be simply a transitional figure until a more stable successor government to Deng could be put in place. Other prominent Party and military figures like President Yang Shangkun and his brother Yang Baibing were believed to be planning a coup.

At the first meeting of the new CCP Politburo Standing Committee, after the Tiananmen Square massacre of 1989, Jiang criticized the previous period as "hard on the economy, soft on politics" and advocated increasing political thought work. Anne-Marie Brady wrote that "Jiang Zemin was a long time political cadre with a nose for ideological work and its importance. This meeting marked the beginning of a new era in propaganda and political thought work in China." Soon after, the Central Propaganda Department was given more resources and power, "including the power to go in to the propaganda-related work units and cleanse the ranks of those who had been supportive of the democracy movement."

The Politburo also issued a list of "seven things" regarding "matters of universal concern to the masses", with party corruption as the top priority. Jiang was also appointed as the chairman of the Central Military Commission on 9 November 1989, succeeding Deng. In the first few years, Jiang depended on the support of Deng Xiaoping to remain in power, which forced Jiang into an "ultranationalist stance" towards Taiwan and the US. Jiang had supported Deng's calls against "bourgeois liberalization", but while Jiang was seen as a "thoughtful reformer", he "[skewed] to the more conservative views of the elders and his Politburo colleagues". Deng was far more supportive of reforms, saying that "deviating to the Left is an even greater danger" than deviating to the right.

Deng grew critical of Jiang's leadership in 1992. During his southern tour, Deng subtly suggested that the pace of reform was not fast enough. Jiang grew ever more cautious, and rallied behind Deng's reforms completely. During this time, the involvement of the Eight Elders in Chinese politics steadily declined. Jiang coined the phrase "socialist market economy" to move China's centrally-planned socialist economy into essentially a government-regulated market economy. It was a huge step to take in the realization of Deng's "socialism with Chinese characteristics". At the same time, Jiang elevated many of his supporters from Shanghai to high government positions, after regaining Deng's confidence. He abolished the outdated Central Advisory Commission in 1992, an advisory body composed of revolutionary party elders. Jiang was appointed as president of China on 27 March 1993; this marked the start of the arrangement in which the paramount leader of China simultaneously serves as Party leader, president and chair of the CMC.

=== Military ===
After Jiang took over as Chairman of the Central Military Commission, he faced several crises. Military leaders Yang Shangkun and Yang Baibing initially marginalized Jiang, but after Jiang won the support of Deng Xiaoping, they gradually lost military power. The Third Taiwan Strait Crisis prompted Jiang reflect on the mistakes of the People's Liberation Army (PLA) and leading him to begin building up military power, purchasing Russian naval and air force weapons, while forbidding the military engaging in business, as well as easing problems with low morale and the near collapse of the military industry. In 1997, Jiang proposed the three-step development strategy for modernizing national defense and armed forces in the Realizing the Strategic Goal of Cross-Century Development of National Defense and Military Modernization. China's military expenditure also began to increase rapidly from 1999.

During his tenure, Jiang ordered a strict investigation into the issue of espionage leaks to the People's Liberation Army. He investigated and dealt with several major espionage leaks, of which the Liu Guangzhi and Liu Liankun cases were the most notable. The Liu Guangzhi case was called "the largest espionage case since the founding of the People's Republic of China." The leaked PLA secrets would affect the cross-strait air control competition over the Taiwan Strait and would have adverse consequences on the PLA's combat effectiveness. The Liu Liankun case was directly involved in the leak of information about the PLA's military exercises during the 1996 presidential election and the Taiwan Strait missile crisis. In May 2004, when meeting with representatives of the 10th Party Congress of the Air Force, Jiang Zemin emphasized: "We must unite the officers and soldiers to actively participate in the great practice of military reform with Chinese characteristics, and make new and greater contributions to building a strong modern People's Air Force and safeguarding national air defense security and the unity of the motherland."

=== Domestic policy ===
Following the 1989 Tiananmen massacre, Jiang launched several campaigns to ensure ideological loyalty. He launched the patriotic education campaign for young people to boost the CCP's legitimacy. In September 1989, he gave a speech about patriotism and the need to educate the youth about it. Additionally, mandatory military training was introduced for university students. He also launched a moral values campaign, while endorsing the new anti-peaceful evolution campaign.

Jiang Zemin's background in science and engineering prompted him to focus on the development of science and education during his time in office. During his tenure, Jiang proposed the revitalize the country through science and education strategy. In December 1989, Jiang Zemin pointed out the impact of scientific and technological progress on the development of social productivity at the National Science and Technology Awards Conference, and insisted on giving priority to the development of science and technology. In October 1992, he proposed "establishing the strategic position of giving priority to the development of science and education" at the 14th CCP National Congress and in 1996, he formed the strategy of rejuvenating the country through science and education. In the following years, the State Council launched the Knowledge Innovation Project, the Technology Innovation Project, Project 211, and Project 985.

On 21 September 1992, the Politburo Standing Committee chaired by Jiang Zemin formally approved the largest space project in the history of the People's Republic of China: the China Manned Space Program. During the implementation of the project, he visited Beijing Aerospace City, Jiuquan Satellite Launch Center and other places many times to inspect and meet with scientific and technological personnel who participated in the development. He also watched the launch of the Shenzhou III manned test spacecraft on site. After more than ten years of development, China became the third country in the world to master independent manned space capabilities after the Soviet Union/Russia and the United States in 2003.

Under Jiang's leadership, China established its first controls over the Internet, when in 1996 Premier Li Peng signed a State Council Order issuing the Temporary Regulations Governing Computer Information Networks and the Internet. The regulations stated that all direct connections to the internet must be channeled through international ports established and maintained by the Ministry of Post and Telecommunications, saying that no group or individual may establish or use any other means to gain internet access. In 1998, the Chinese government started a project to maintain tighter control over the internet in what became known as the Great Firewall.

In June 1999, Jiang established an extralegal department, the 610 Office, to crack down on Falun Gong. Cook and Lemish state this was because Jiang was worried that the popular new religious movement was "quietly infiltrating the CCP and state apparatus." On 20 July, security forces arrested thousands of Falun Gong organizers they identified as leaders. The persecution that followed was characterized as a nationwide campaign of propaganda, as well as the large-scale arbitrary imprisonment and coercive reeducation of Falun Gong organizers, sometimes resulting in death due to mistreatment in detention.

=== Economic policy ===
In the early 1990s, post-Tiananmen economic reforms by Vice Premier and later Premier Zhu Rongji with Jiang's support had stabilized and the country was on a consistent growth trajectory, reaching an annual rate of nearly 10 percent by the late 1990s. Jiang had inherited a complicated trade regime that simultaneously incentivized exports while maintaining protectionist policies, including an unweighted average tariff rate of 43.1 percent in 1992.

One of the ways Jiang and Zhu addressed internal inefficiencies was by using China's long-held goal of joining the World Trade Organization as political impetus to force domestic reform. Jiang and Zhu initiated major reforms to state-owned enterprises (SOEs) during their tenure. As part of grasping the large, letting go of the small strategy, they oversaw a massive administrative restructuring. In 1998 alone, Zhu slashed the central bureaucracy in half and over 11 ministries. A number of heavy industries were deregulated and many small- and medium-sized SOEs were closed down or privatized, initially removing as many as 40 million jobs from SOEs in a process widely known as "Xiagang" (下岗: to get down from the post). In addition to bureaucratic restructuring, China also accepted WTO accession terms that were far more stringent than other developing countries who joined the WTO, including drastically reducing tariffs for manufactured goods and improved legal protections for foreign firms. However, these reforms left a mixed legacy. While accession to the WTO is credited with China's growth from the sixth largest world economy to the second, economic growth intensified regional imbalances.

While the eastern coastal region remained the core of trade development, the central and western regions lagged behind. Jiang's administration worked to reduce geographic disparities by encouraging richer cities to "provide financial, technological, and managerial assistance to the poorer, western ones." Jiang put forward the plan for China's western development. Construction of various infrastructure projects such as the Qinghai–Tibet railway and the Three Gorges Dam began under Jiang's leadership. Jiang launched the Going Global policy in 1999, a national strategy which sought to develop national champion firms, increase foreign demand for Chinese goods and services, and secure energy and resources. This policy greatly expanded Chinese investment and influence in the global South, particularly in Africa and Asia. During Jiang's tenure, China adopted policies to expand its trade and economic relations with other countries through the Maritime Commerce Law (1993), Anti-Subsidy Rules (1997), and 2001 revisions to the Foreign Investment Law.

=== Foreign policy ===
Under Jiang's leadership, China continued its style of developmental diplomacy which had been adopted under Deng Xiaoping. China's international behavior was generally both pragmatic and predictable. During Jiang's presidency, serious flare-ups between China and the United States occurred. Nonetheless, Jiang's foreign policy was for the most part passive and non-confrontational. Foreign policy under Jiang inherited from that of Deng Xiaoping, that is, "hide your strength, bide your time", which emphasized the use of cooperative rhetoric and the avoidance of controversy.

==== Russia and Central Asia ====
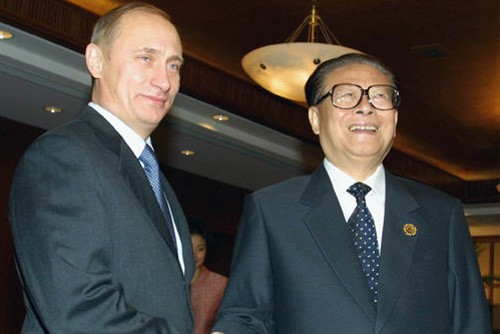
Jiang with President of Russia Vladimir Putin at APEC summit in Shanghai (2001)

Jiang oversaw the deepening of China's relations with Russia. In 1991, Jiang signed the Agreement between the People's Republic of China and the Union of Soviet Socialist Republics on the Eastern Section of the Sino-Soviet Border with Soviet leader Mikhail Gorbachev, and signed the Memorandum of Understanding between the Chinese and Russian Governments on the Mutual Reduction of Armed Forces in Border Areas and Strengthening of Military Trust with Russian president Boris Yeltsin. On 23 December 1992, Yeltsin made his first official visit to China, where he met with Jiang Zemin and Chinese president Yang Shangkun. During the 1990s, cooperation between China and Russia was facilitated by the two countries' mutual desires to balance the influence of the United States and establish a multi-polar international system.

Jiang also started to meet regularly with Russian president Boris Yeltsin, who visited Beijing in November 1997, while Jiang visited Moscow in 1998. Relations were further strengthened by the joint opposition to the NATO intervention in Yugoslavia. In December 1999, during his visit to China, Yeltsin signed the Protocol on the Demarcation of the Eastern and Western Sections of the Sino-Russian Border with Jiang Zemin. In 2001, the two countries established the Shanghai Cooperation Organisation (SCO) together with Kazakhstan, Kyrgyzstan, Tajikistan, and Uzbekistan. A month later, the close relations between the two countries were formalized with the Treaty of Good-Neighborliness and Friendly Cooperation, a twenty-year strategic and economic treaty.

Jiang signed an agreement with Tajikistan in 2002 to cede about 27,000 square kilometers of disputed land in the neighboring Pamir region, allowing Tajikistan to obtain 96.5% of the disputed territory. However, before the signing of the treaty, all the disputed territories were claimed by Tajikistan and actually controlled. After the signing of the treaty, China actually increased its actual controlled land by at least 1,000 square kilometers. In 2004, China and Russia re-demarcated the border, dividing Heixiazi Island into two parts, with the western part returning to China.

==== Southeast Asia ====
After 1990, China–Vietnam relations returned to normal, the eleven-year border conflict ended, the land border between the two countries was finally demarcated, and the two sides drew a median line in the Beibu Gulf. On 25 December 2000, Jiang Zemin, on behalf of China, signed the Beibu Gulf Delimitation Agreement with Vietnam, formally recognizing Vietnam's sovereignty over the Bạch Long Vĩ Island. At the same time, the China-Vietnam Beibu Gulf Fisheries Cooperation Agreement was also signed.

==== United States ====
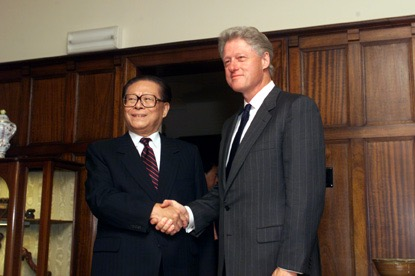
Jiang Zemin with U.S. President Bill Clinton on 11 September 1999

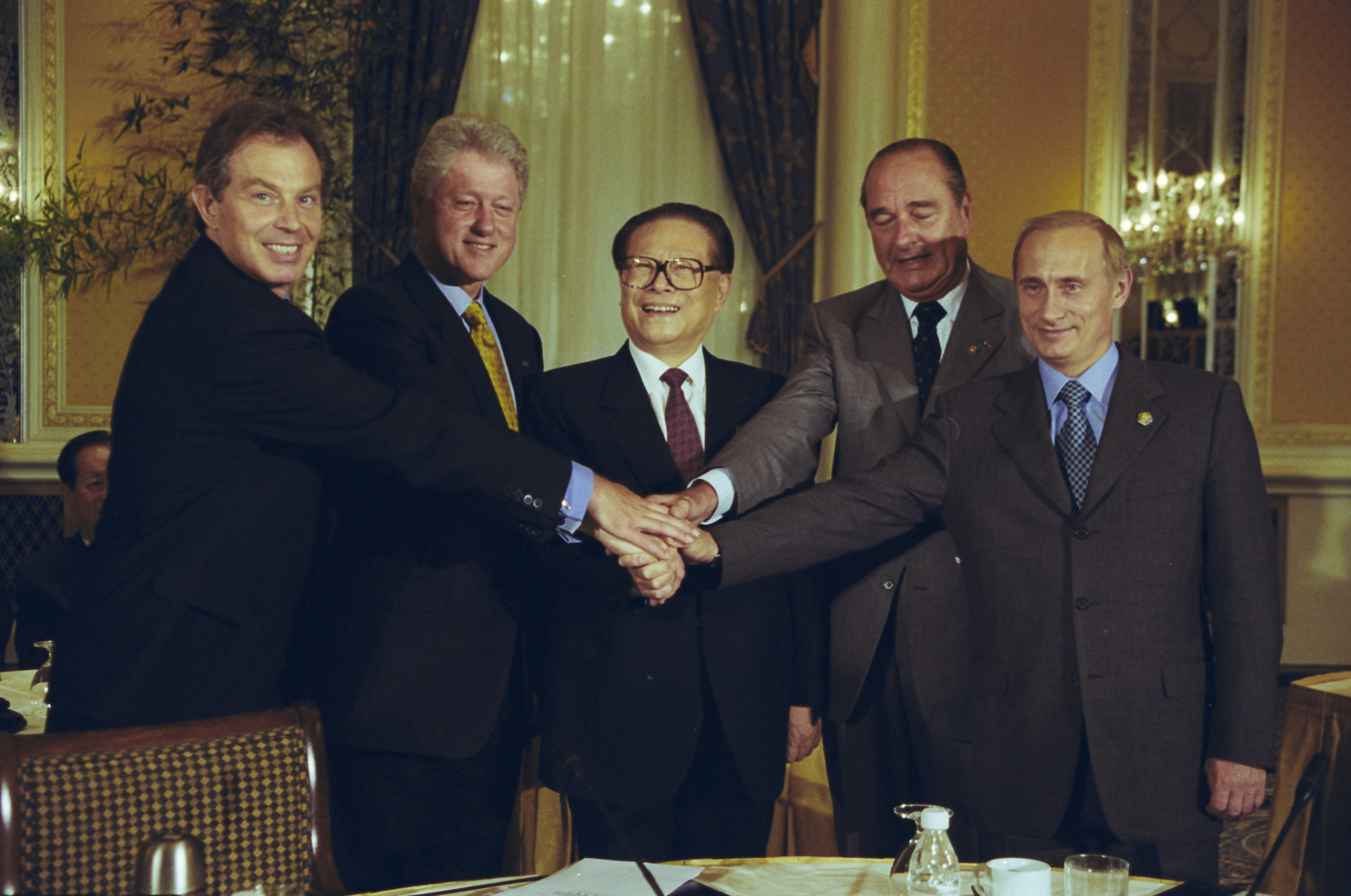
Jiang with U.S. President Clinton, British Prime Minister Tony Blair, French President Jacques Chirac, and Russian President Vladimir Putin at the Waldorf Astoria, New York, on 7 September 2000

In July 1993, the United States Navy stopped a Chinese container ship, the Yinhe, based on the incorrect suspicion that it was carrying chemical weapon precursors bound for Iran. Although China denied the allegation, the United States cut off the Yinhe's GPS, causing it to lose direction and anchor on the high seas for twenty-four days until it acceded to an inspection. There were no chemical precursors on the ship. Although China sought a formal apology, the United States refused to apologize and refused to pay compensation. Despite the humiliation of the Yinhe incident, Jiang took a stance of goodwill towards the United States and adopted the "sixteen-characters formula" for working with the United States: "enhancing confidence, reducing troubles, expanding cooperation, and avoiding confrontation."

Jiang oversaw a series of missile tests in the waters surrounding Taiwan in 1996 in protest to the Republic of China government under President Lee Teng-hui, who had been seen as moving its foreign policy away from the One-China policy. The United States sent two carrier groups to the vicinity of Taiwan, and the PRC de-escalated. As a result of the United States response, Jiang ordered the People's Liberation Army to begin a ten-year modernization program.

Jiang went on a state visit to the United States in 1997, drawing various crowds in protest from the Tibet Independence Movement to supporters of the Chinese democracy movement. He made a speech at Harvard University, part of it in English, but could not escape questions on democracy and freedom. In the official summit meeting with president Bill Clinton, the tone was relaxed as they sought common ground while largely ignoring areas of disagreement. Clinton would visit China in June 1998, and vowed that China and the United States were partners in the world, and not adversaries. In 1998, Chinese president Jiang praised the American film Titanic during an address to the National People's Congress in order to demonstrate his endorsement of Western cultural imports.

After the United States bombing of the Chinese embassy in Belgrade in 1999, Jiang deemed the United States-China bilateral relation too important to be harmed in the emotion of the moment and sought to soothe the Chinese public's outrage. In an emergency Politburo meeting on 8 May 1999, Jiang Zemin instructed the CMC to strengthen the PLA to prevent future attacks on Chinese interests. Among the measures China took to close its lack in leverage with the United States were efforts to develop precision missiles and accelerating plans to expand conventional missile forces. China increased military funding, including to speed up the weapons development program Project 995.

The Hainan island incident was another tense event in the China-United States relations which occurred during Jiang's presidency. On 1 April 2001, a United States US EP-3 surveillance aircraft collided mid-air with a Chinese Shenyang J-8 jet fighter over the South China Sea. China sought a formal apology, and accepted United States secretary of state Colin Powell's expression of "very sorry" as sufficient. The incident nonetheless created negative feelings towards the United States by the Chinese public and increased public feelings of Chinese nationalism.

=== Media depiction ===
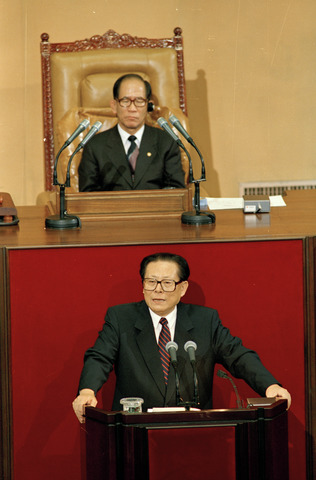
Jiang Zemin delivered a speech at the South Korean National Assembly in 1995

The People's Daily and CCTV's 7 pm Xinwen Lianbo each had Jiang-related events as the front-page or top stories, a fact that remained until Hu Jintao's media administrative changes in 2006. Jiang appeared casual in front of Western media, and gave an unprecedented interview with Mike Wallace of CBS in 2000 at Beidaihe. He would often use foreign languages in front of the camera; once, he gave a 40-minute speech entirely in Russian. In an encounter with Hong Kong reporter Sharon Cheung in 2000 regarding the central government's apparent "imperial order" of supporting Tung Chee-hwa to seek a second term as Chief Executive of Hong Kong, Jiang scolded the Hong Kong journalists as "too simple, sometimes naive" in English.

=== Hong Kong and Macau ===
In 1997, Jiang oversaw the handover of Hong Kong from the United Kingdom. In 1999, he oversaw the handover of Macau from Portugal.

=== Taiwan ===
On 11 June 1990, Jiang Zemin expressed his views on the speech of Taiwanese president Lee Teng-hui at the opening ceremony of the National United Front Work Conference. He reiterated that as long as both sides sit down and truly adhere to the principle of "one China" rather than "two Chinas," "one China, one Taiwan," or "one country, two governments," all issues can be raised for discussion and consultation.

On 21 November 1990, Taiwan established the Straits Exchange Foundation, a non-governmental intermediary organization authorized by the Taiwanese government to contact and negotiate with the mainland, to handle cross-strait affairs that the government was inconvenient or unable to handle. Subsequently, the Association for Relations Across the Taiwan Straits, the mainland's counterpart, was established on 16 December 1991, and authorized to adhere to the one-China principle as the basis for exchanges and negotiations between the two associations. From 28 to 30 October 1992, the two associations held preliminary negotiations in Hong Kong and finally reached the "1992 Consensus" on 16 November. From 27 to 29 April 1993, Wang Daohan, Chairman of the Association for Relations Across the Taiwan Straits, and Koo Chen-fu, Chairman of the Straits Exchange Foundation, held the Koo-Wang Talks in Singapore. This had a significant impact on promoting cross-strait negotiations, accelerating cross-strait economic and trade cooperation and various exchanges. On 30 January 1995, Jiang Zemin put forward the "Eight Points for the Peaceful Reunification Process".

The Taiwan issue during Jiang Zemin's administration was largely influenced by China-U.S. relations and Taiwan-US relations. During Lee Teng-hui's visit to Cornell University in 1995, he delivered a public speech entitled "What the People Want Is Always in My Heart" at the Olin Lectures at Cornell University. This speech was considered by mainland China to be advocating the two-state theory, which caused the previously friendly cross-strait relations to take a sharp turn for the worse and gradually drift apart, and directly led to the Third Taiwan Strait Crisis. In November 2002, Jiang Zemin, who was about to step down as General Secretary, proposed the "three things that can be discussed" for the unification of China in his report to the 16th CCP National Congress.

=== Three Represents ===
On 25 February 2000, Jiang introduced the theory of Three Represents, which was later enshrined in both Party and State constitutions as an "important thought", following in the footsteps of Marxism–Leninism, Mao Zedong Thought and Deng Xiaoping Theory. Officially termed as the latest development of Socialism with Chinese characteristics under Jiang's tenure, the Three Represents justified the incorporation of the new capitalist business class into the party, and changed the founding ideology of the CCP from protecting the interests of the peasantry and workers to that of the "overwhelming majority of the people", a euphemism aimed at placating the growing entrepreneurial class. Conservative critics within the party, such as hardline leftist Deng Liqun, denounced this as betrayal of "true" communist ideology. Before he transferred power to a younger generation of leaders, Jiang had his theory of Three Represents written into the Party's constitution, alongside Marxism–Leninism, Mao Zedong Thought, and Deng Xiaoping Theory at the 16th CCP Congress in 2002.

== Retirement ==
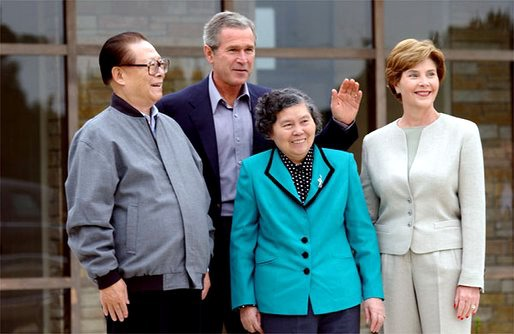
Jiang with his wife and George W. Bush with his wife in Crawford, Texas, 25 October 2002

In the run-up to the 16th National Congress of the CCP, Hu Jintao had "almost unanimous support" to become the new CCP general secretary. To maintain China's image as a stable and respected country, Jiang and Hu emphasized their unity, striving to make this transition the first "smooth and harmonious" one in the PRC's history. Jiang stepped down as general secretary and left the Politburo Standing Committee, but retained the chairmanship of the Central Military Commission, which controlled the army and the nation's foreign policy. Jiang would continue counselling Hu from "behind the curtain", and it was formally agreed that Jiang would be "consulted on all matters of state importance". Both men also reached a "tacit understanding" that Hu would not be considered a "core" leader like Jiang, Deng and Mao. At the Congress, the majority of new members for Standing Committee were considered part of Jiang's so-called "Shanghai clique", the most prominent being vice president Zeng Qinghong, who had served as Jiang's chief of staff for many years, and vice premier Huang Ju, a former party secretary of Shanghai.

After Hu succeeded Jiang as general secretary, the latter continued to "[dominate] public life" for several years. The South China Morning Post announced that "a new era has begun in China. But it is not that of Vice President Hu Jintao [...] Rather, it is a new era of President Jiang Zemin, who has just stepped down as the Party's general secretary." Early in the 2003 SARS crisis, Jiang remained conspicuously silent, and observers were divided over whether it signified his waning influence, or respect for Hu. It has been argued that the institutional arrangements created by the 16th Congress left Jiang in a position where he could not exercise much influence. Although Jiang retained the chairmanship of the CMC, most members of the commission were professional military men. People's Liberation Army Daily, a publication thought to represent the views of the CMC majority, printed an article on 11 March 2003 which quotes two army delegates as saying, "Having one center is called 'loyalty', while having two centers will result in 'problems.'" This was interpreted as a criticism of Jiang's attempt to exercise dual leadership with Hu on the model of Deng Xiaoping.

On 19 September 2004, after the 4th Plenary Session of the 16th Central Committee, Jiang, at the age of 78, relinquished his post as chairman of the party's Central Military Commission, his last post in the party. Six months later in March 2005, Jiang resigned his last significant post, chairman of the Central Military Commission of the state, which marked the end of Jiang's political career. This followed weeks of speculation that forces inside the party were pressing Jiang to step aside. Jiang's term was supposed to have lasted until 2007. Hu also succeeded Jiang as the CMC chairman, but, in an apparent political defeat for Jiang, General Xu Caihou, and not Zeng Qinghong was appointed to succeed Hu as vice chairman, as was initially speculated. This power transition formally marked the end of Jiang's era in China, which roughly lasted from 1989 to 2004.

=== Official appearances after retirement ===
After retiring, Jiang Zemin spent most of his time in Shanghai, and his apartment was near the Xuhui campus of Shanghai Jiao Tong University. Every year during the Qingming Festival in April, Jiang would return to his hometown to pay respects to his ancestors. Jiang continued to make official appearances after giving up his last title in 2005. In China's strictly defined protocol sequence, Jiang's name always appeared immediately after Hu Jintao's and in front of the remaining sitting members of the CCP Politburo Standing Committee. On 10 August 2006, the Selected Works of Jiang Zemin was published. Jiang personally presided over the editing and review of the book's volumes one to three.

In 2007, Jiang was seen with Hu Jintao on stage at a ceremony celebrating the 80th anniversary of the founding of the People's Liberation Army, and toured the Military Museum of the Chinese People's Revolution with Li Peng, Zhu Rongji, and other former senior officials. In 2008, Jiang published an academic article on China's clean energy resources and another on China's information technology development titled Reflections on Energy Issues in China. He also attended the 2008 Sichuan earthquake memorial service. On 8 August 2008, Jiang appeared at the opening ceremony of the Beijing Olympics. On 23 April 2009, Jiang returned to Hangzhou to inspect the China United Engineering Corporation. He also visited places such as the West Lake, Mount Tai, the National Museum of China, and Shanghai University of Science and Technology. He also stood beside Hu Jintao during the mass parade celebrating the 60th anniversary of the People's Republic of China in October 2009.

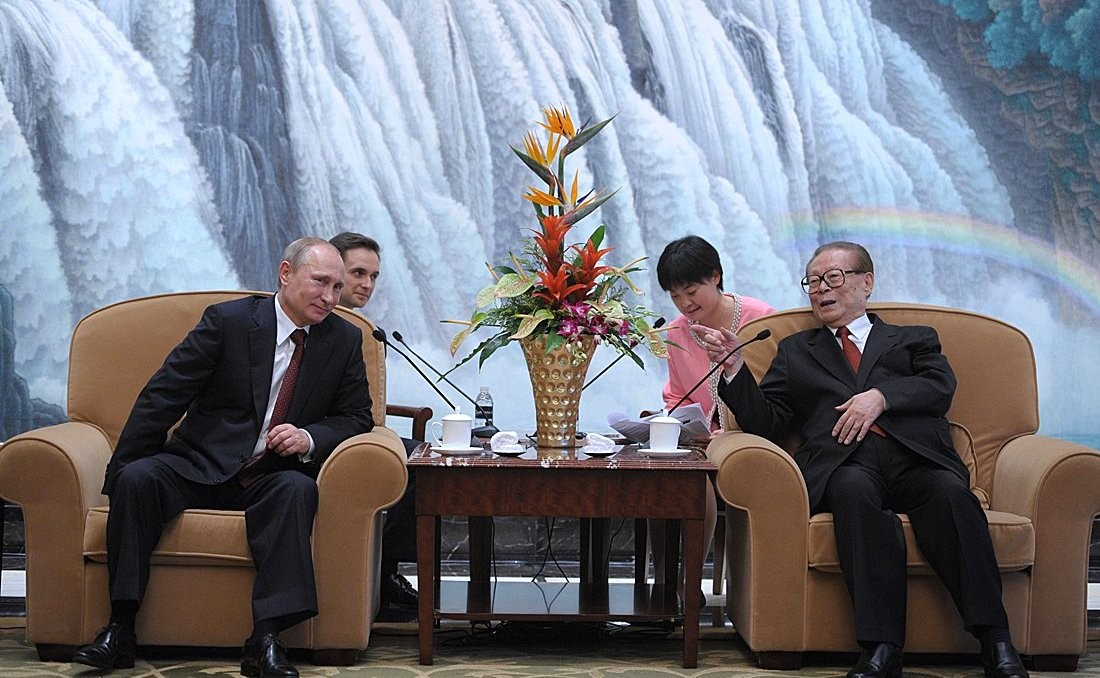
Jiang Zemin meeting with Russian president Vladimir Putin in Shanghai on 20 May 2014

JIang attended the 2010 Yushu earthquake memorial service. Beginning in July 2011, false reports of Jiang's death began circulating on the news media outside of mainland China and on the internet. While Jiang may indeed have been ill and receiving treatment, the rumors were denied by official sources. On 9 October 2011, Jiang made his first public appearance since his premature obituary in Beijing at a celebration to commemorate the 100th anniversary of the Xinhai Revolution. Jiang reappeared at the 18th Party Congress in October 2012. On 20 May 2014, Jiang met with Russian President Vladimir Putin in Shanghai. He took part in the 65th Anniversary banquet of the founding of the People's Republic of China in October 2014. At the banquet he sat next to Xi Jinping, who had then succeeded Hu Jintao as CCP general secretary. In September 2015, Jiang attended the parade celebrating 70 years since end of World War II; there, Jiang again sat next to Xi Jinping and Hu Jintao. He appeared on 29 May 2017 at Shanghai Technology University.

After Xi Jinping assumed power in 2012, Jiang's position in the protocol sequence of leaders retreated; while he was often seated next to Xi Jinping at official events, his name was often reported after all standing members of the Communist Party's Politburo. Jiang reappeared at the 19th Party Congress on 18 October 2017. He appeared on 29 July 2019 at the funeral of former premier Li Peng. He also attended the 70th anniversary of the founding of the People's Republic of China mass parade in October 2019, marking his last public appearance prior to his death. He did not attend the 100th Anniversary of the Chinese Communist Party in July 2021 and 20th Party Congress in October 2022. Photos of Jiang circulated in social media following his 96th birthday on 17 August 2022. According to Radio Free Asia, Jiang's health was generally good before his death, and that he enjoyed swimming. It added he visited Beidaihe before the COVID-19 pandemic, and that he "no longer interfered in politics".

== Family and personal life ==
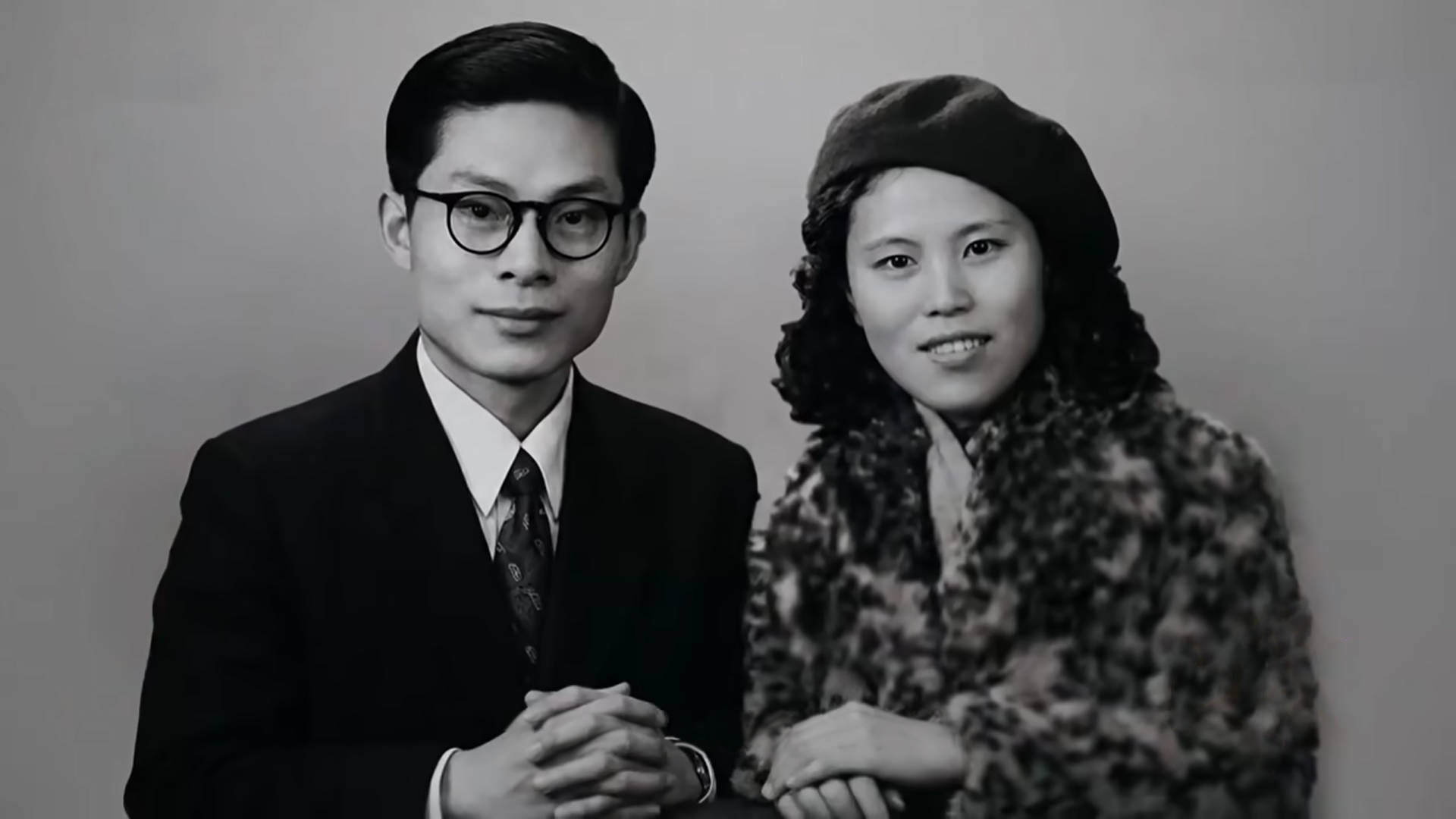
A wedding photo of Jiang Zemin and Wang Yeping, circa 1950.

Jiang married Wang Yeping, also a native of Yangzhou, in 1949. She was his cousin, as Jiang's adoptive mother was Wang's aunt. Wang graduated from Shanghai International Studies University. They had two sons together, Jiang Mianheng and Jiang Miankang. Jiang Mianheng went on to be an academic and businessman, working within the Chinese space program, and founded Grace Semiconductor Manufacturing Corporation. It is believed that Jiang had a long-running friendship with the singer Song Zuying, Chen Zhili, and others. Following the rise of Xi Jinping, Song and other Jiang loyalists, including her brother Song Zuyu, fell under investigation for corruption.

Jiang had a passable command of several foreign languages, including English and Russian. Jiang remains the only paramount leader of China known to be able to speak English. He enjoyed engaging foreign visitors in small talk on arts and literature in their native language, in addition to singing foreign songs in their original languages. He played several instruments including erhu, piano and violin, and was also fond of singing. In 1987, he sang When We Were Young and danced with Dianne Feinstein, who was mayor of San Francisco at the time. On his 1997 visit to the United States, he sang Beijing opera songs. Jiang also played the ukulele during his 1997 visit to Hawai'i. Jiang was televised singing Elvis Presley songs with Philippines President Fidel V. Ramos, in what academic Richard Curt Kraus described as an "unprecedented act for a Chinese leader in its use of modern public relations to convey an image of down-home folksiness". He was also a personal friend of former Canadian prime minister Jean Chrétien.

== Death ==
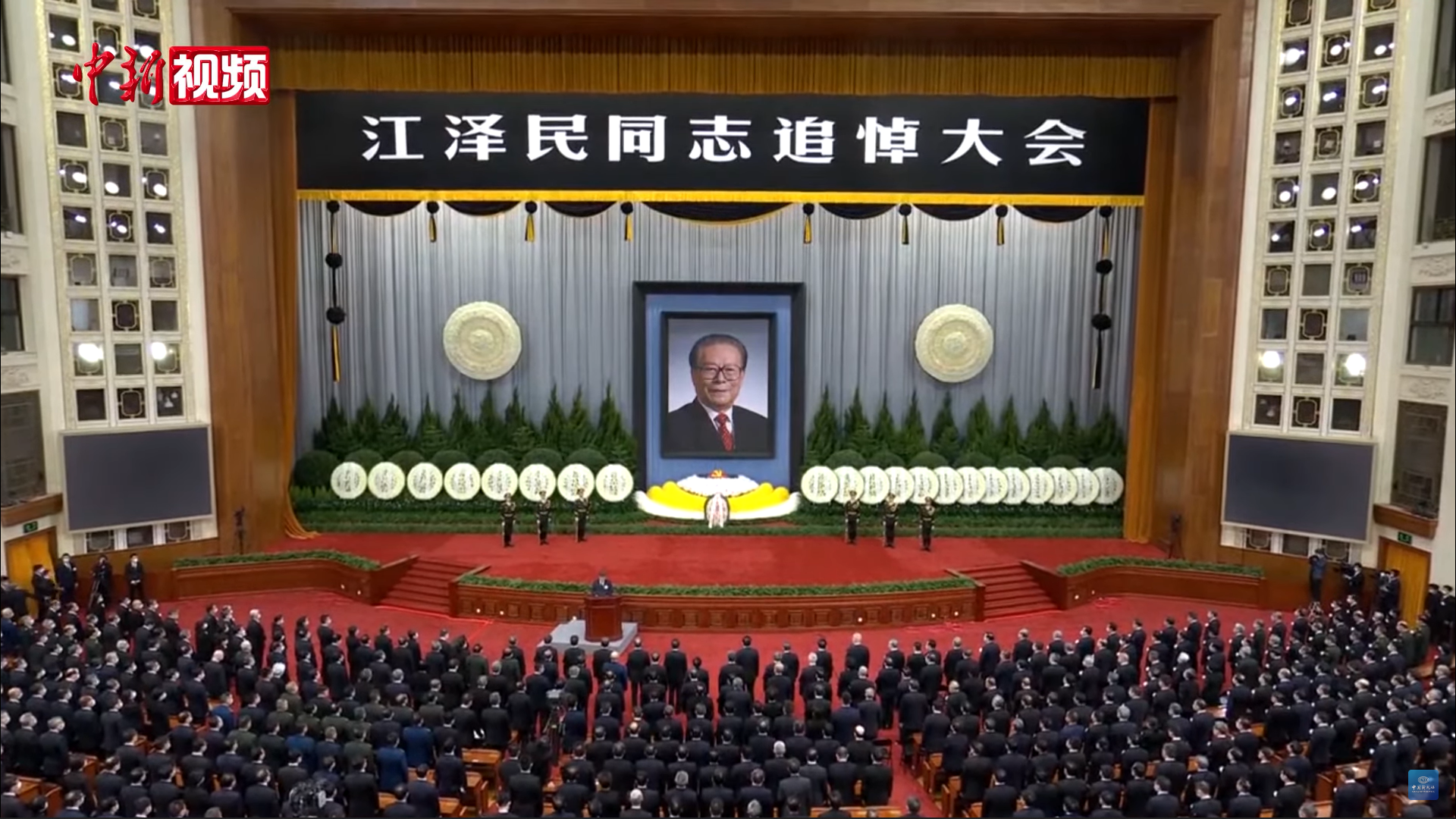
Memorial Service for Jiang Zemin at the Great Hall of the People

Jiang died on 30 November 2022, at the age of 96, in Huadong Hospital in Shanghai. According to the Chinese state media Xinhua News Agency, he died at 12:13 pm from leukemia and multiple organ failures. On the day of Jiang's death, the government released a notice that the national flags would be flown half-mast in key locations of Beijing and diplomatic missions abroad. Foreigners were not invited to attend official mourning activities. Jiang's body was cremated at Babaoshan Revolutionary Cemetery and his ashes were scattered near the mouth of the Yangtze River.

== Honours ==
Jiang has received state honours from several countries, including the Order of the Southern Cross from Brazil and the Order of José Martí from Cuba.

== Legacy ==
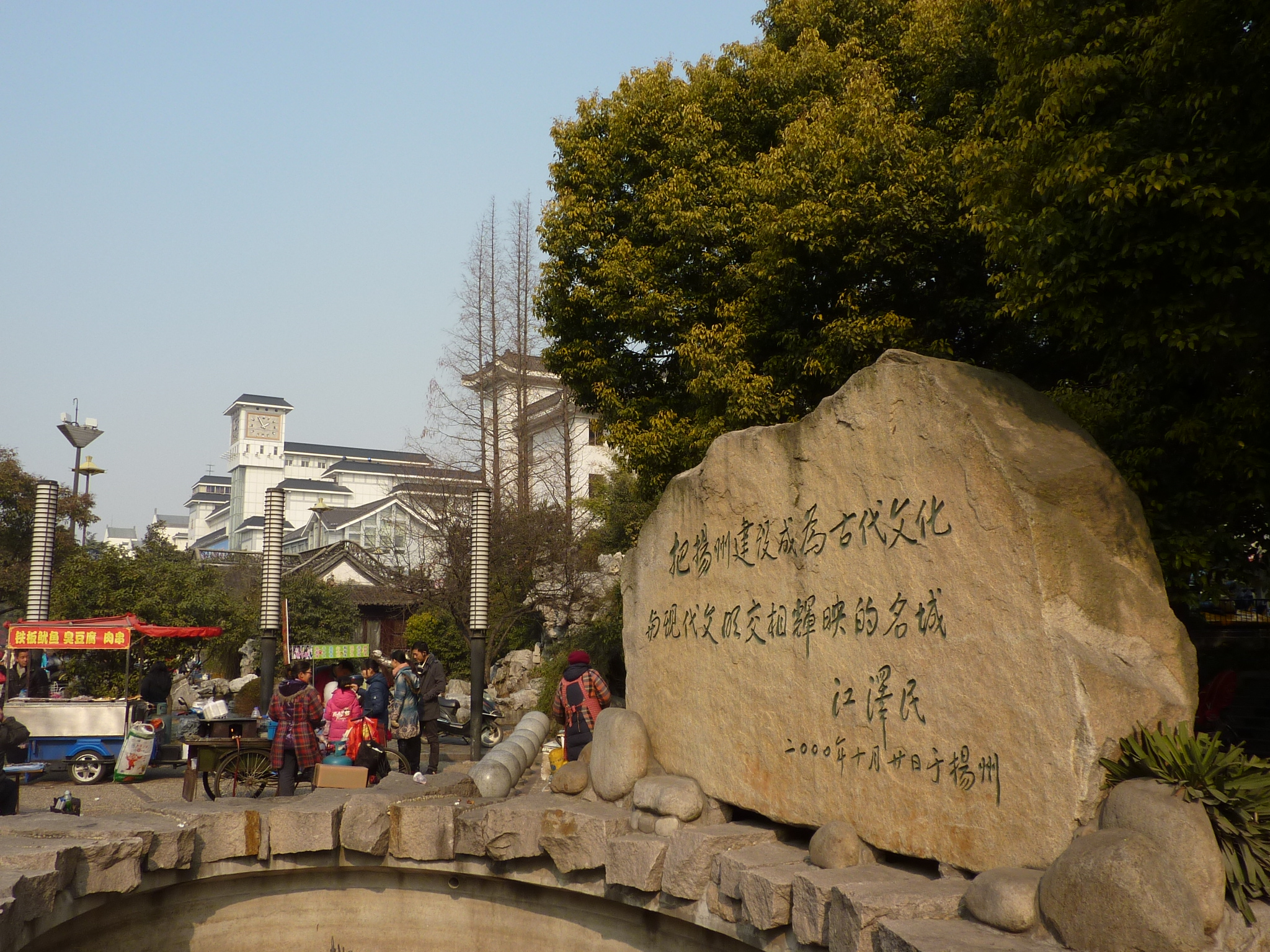
Jiang's inscription engraved on a stone in his hometown, Yangzhou

The policies of his successors, Hu Jintao and Wen Jiabao, have widely been seen as efforts to address perceived imbalances and move away from a sole focus on economic growth toward a broader view of development which incorporates non-economic factors such as health and the environment.

Domestically, Jiang's legacy and reputation is mixed. While some people attributed the period of relative stability and growth in the 1990s to Jiang's term, others argue that Jiang did little to correct systemic imbalance and an accumulation of problems which resulted from years of breakneck-pace economic reforms, leaving the next administration facing innumerable challenges, some of which may have been too late to solve.

The fact that Jiang rose to power as the direct beneficiary of the political aftermath of Tiananmen has shaped the perception of his rule. Following the Tiananmen protests, Jiang threw his support behind elder Chen Yun's conservative economic policies, but subsequently changed his allegiance to Deng Xiaoping's reform-oriented agenda following the latter's "Southern Tour". This shift was not only seen as the exercise of a political opportunist, it also sowed confusion among party loyalists in regards to what direction the party was headed or what the party truly believed in. While continued economic reforms resulted in an explosion of wealth around the country, it also led to the formation of special interest groups in many sectors of the economy, and the exercise of state power without any meaningful oversight. This opened the way for the sub-optimal distribution of the fruits of growth, and an expanding culture of corruption among bureaucrats and party officials.

Historian and former Xinhua journalist Yang Jisheng wrote that Jiang might well have been given a positive historical assessment had it not been for his decision to 'overstay his welcome' by remaining in the Central Military Commission post after Hu had formally assumed the party leadership. Moreover, Jiang took credit for all the gains made during the 13 years "between 1989 and 2002", which not only evoked the memories of Jiang being a beneficiary of Tiananmen, but also neglected the economic foundations laid by Deng, whose authority was still paramount until the mid-1990s. Additionally, Jiang was also criticized for his insistence on writing the "Three Represents" into the party and state constitutions (see below), which Yang called Jiang's attempt at "self-deification", i.e., that he saw himself as a visionary along the same lines as Deng and Mao. Yang contended, "The 'Three Represents' is just common sense. It is not a proper theoretical framework. It's what any ruler would tell the people to justify the continued rule of the governing party."

Jiang did not specialize in economics, and in 1997 handed most of the economic governance of the country to premier Zhu Rongji and remained in office through the Asian financial crisis. Under their joint leadership, Mainland China sustained an average of 8% GDP growth annually, achieving the highest rate of per capita economic growth in major world economies, raising eyebrows around the world with its astonishing speed. This was mostly achieved by continuing the process of a transition to a market economy. Additionally, he helped increase China's international standing with China joining the World Trade Organization in 2001 and Beijing winning the bid to host the 2008 Summer Olympics.

Some have also associated Jiang with the widespread corruption and cronyism that had become a notable feature of the Communist power apparatus since Jiang's years in power. In the military, the two vice-chairmen who sat atop the Central Military Commission hierarchy – nominally as assistants to then chairman Hu Jintao – Vice Chairmen Xu Caihou and Guo Boxiong, were said to have obstructed Hu Jintao's exercise of power in the military. Xu and Guo were characterized as "Jiang's proxies in the military". Eventually, both men were reported to have taken massive bribes, and both fell under the axe of the anti-corruption campaign under Xi Jinping.

At the same time, many biographers of Jiang have noted his government resembled an oligarchy as opposed to an autocratic dictatorship. Many of the policies of his era had been attributed to others in government, notably premier Zhu Rongji. Jiang was also characterized as a leader who was mindful to seek the opinion of his close advisers. Jiang is often credited with the improvement in foreign relations during his term, but at the same time many Chinese have criticized him for being too conciliatory towards the United States and Russia. The issue of Chinese unification between the mainland and Taiwan gained ground during Jiang's term.

In 2009, Jiang himself evaluated his tenure by saying "In the more than ten years I have been in Beijing, I have done nothing but three things. First, I established the socialist market economy. Second, I included Deng Xiaoping Theory in the Party Constitution. Third, the 'Three Represents'. If there is any achievement, it is that the army is not allowed to engage in business, which has a great impact on the fate of the army. Because I later served for another year and eight months, which is equivalent to 15 years as Chairman of the Central Military Commission. The 1998 flood control was also very important." In 2021, the Resolution on the Major Achievements and Historical Experience of the Party over the Past Century evaluated Jiang's tenure as:

After the fourth plenary session of the 13th Central Committee, Chinese communists, with Comrade Jiang Zemin as their chief representative, united and led the whole Party and the entire nation in upholding the Party's basic theory and line, deepening their understanding of what socialism is and how to build it, and what kind of party to build and how to build it. On this basis, they formed the Theory of Three Represents. In the face of complex domestic and international situations and serious setbacks confronting world socialism, they safeguarded socialism with Chinese characteristics, defined building a socialist market economy as an objective of reform and set a basic framework in this regard, and established a basic economic system for the primary stage of socialism under which public ownership is the mainstay and diverse forms of ownership develop together, as well as an income distribution system under which distribution according to work is the mainstay while multiple forms of distribution exist alongside it. They opened up new horizons for reform and opening up across all fronts and advanced the great new project of Party building. All these efforts helped to successfully launch socialism with Chinese characteristics into the 21st century.

From 11 to 16 August 2026, on the eve of the 100th anniversary of Jiang's birth, the China Central Television released a 12-episode documentary titled Jiang Zemin. In addition, the Publicity Department of the Chinese Communist Party, together with multiple departments, held a seminar on Jiang Zemin's thought. On the 100th anniversary of his birth on 17 August 2026, top officials attended a commemoration event at the Great Hall of the People, where Chinese leader Xi Jinping delivered a speech. On the same day, the People's Bank of China issued a series of commemorative coins. China Post issued a set of two commemorative stamps and a miniature sheet of commemorative stamps.

== Works ==
- Jiang, Zamin (June 2008). "Reflections on energy issues in China". Journal of Shanghai Jiaotong University (Science). 13 (3). Springer: 257–274. doi:10.1007/s12204-008-0257-7.
- Jiang Zemin (2010). Selected Works of Jiang Zemin. Vol. I (1st ed.). Beijing: Foreign Languages Press. ISBN 978-7-119-06025-5. Archived from the original on 6 December 2020.
- — (2012). Selected Works of Jiang Zemin. Vol. II (1st ed.). Beijing: Foreign Languages Press. ISBN 978-7-119-07383-5. Archived from the original on 6 December 2020.
- — (2013). Selected Works of Jiang Zemin. Vol. III (1st ed.). Beijing: Foreign Languages Press. ISBN 978-7-119-07978-3.

== See also ==
- Moha (meme), an internet meme spoofing Jiang
- State visit by Jiang Zemin to Japan

== Notes ==
Party political offices
Preceded by Rui Xingwen	Party Secretary of Shanghai; 1987–1989	Succeeded by Zhu Rongji
Preceded by Zhao Ziyang	General Secretary of the Chinese Communist Party; 1989–2002	Succeeded by Hu Jintao
Preceded by Deng Xiaoping	Chairman of the Central Military Commission of the Chinese Communist Party; 1989–2004	Succeeded by Hu Jintao
Political offices
Preceded by Zhang Ting	Minister of the Electronics Industry; 1983–1985	Succeeded by Li Tieying
Preceded by Wang Daohan	Mayor of Shanghai; 1985–1988	Succeeded by Zhu Rongji
Preceded by Yang Shangkun	President of China; 1993–2003	Succeeded by Hu Jintao
Diplomatic posts
Preceded by Hassanal Bolkiah	Chairperson of APEC; 2001	Succeeded by Vicente Fox
Order of precedence
Preceded by First	Orders of precedence in the People's Republic of China (General Secretary of the Communist Party; 1st ranked); 1989–1993	Succeeded by Yang Shangkun (President, 2nd ranked)
Preceded by First	Orders of precedence in the Politburo Standing Committee (General Secretary of the Communist Party; 1st ranked); 1989–2002	Succeeded by Li Peng (2nd randed)
