= Business activities of the Chinese military =

Chinese government policy in the 1980s

During part of the 1980s and 1990s, the Central Military Commission (CMC) of the Chinese Communist Party (CCP) allowed the People's Liberation Army (PLA) and the People's Armed Police (PAP) to legally engage in business and trade. This policy was officially promulgated on 2 April 1985. Later, the CMC believed that its drawbacks of this policy were too great, so it gradually rolled back the decision. On 15 December 1998, the PLA and PAP completed the decoupling of most of their operating enterprises. In July 2019, the CMC announced the cessation of all paid services by the military. Currently, only the Xinjiang Production and Construction Corps (XPCC) still operates its own businesses.

== Promulgation and implementation ==
In 1985, at the enlarged meeting of the Central Military Commission (CMC) of the Chinese Communist Party (CCP), Deng Xiaoping, Chairman of the Central Military Commission, advocated saving military expenditure for the sake of reform and opening up. As a result, tight military expenditure gradually became a prominent problem faced by the central government and governments at all levels at that time. Under this background, the military was allowed to engage in business. On 2 April 1985, the General Staff Department, the General Political Department and the General Logistics Department of the People's Liberation Army (PLA) formulated the Interim Provisions on the Military Engagement in Production, Operation and Foreign Trade, which was forwarded and implemented by the State Council and the CMC on 4 May 1985. The "Interim Provisions" made clear provisions on the production, operation and foreign trade activities of the troops. The main contents include:

1. When the military engages in production and business activities, it must strictly abide by the relevant policies, laws and disciplines of the Party, the State and the military, and ensure the completion of various tasks such as combat readiness, training and construction, and the security of military secrets. Smuggling, speculation, tax evasion, short selling and profiteering are strictly prohibited; it is not allowed to purchase or resell the state's scarce materials or sell materials allocated within the plan. Units that implement enterprise management must apply for approval in accordance with national regulations, operate in accordance with the law, and pay taxes in accordance with regulations. Strictly implement the principle of separation of responsibilities between the military and enterprises, and separation of officials and businessmen, implement autonomous operation, independent accounting, self-financing, do not occupy military establishment, do not consume national defense funds, and are not allowed to use the troops' equipment and camp property, raw materials, fuel, etc.
2. Units below the army level should mainly develop planting, animal husbandry, breeding, forestry and agricultural and sideline product processing. The proportion of troops engaged in agricultural and sideline production and operation activities should be controlled within 5%. In order to solve the problem of insufficient technical force, local professional and technical personnel can be hired through local personnel and labor departments, and contract workers and temporary workers can be hired. After completing the subsidy adjustment and supply and upward adjustment tasks stipulated by the superiors, the surplus products produced by the troops can be sold through military service agencies, or entrusted to local commercial and supply and marketing departments for sales. With the approval of the local government, certain industrial and agricultural production projects can be jointly operated with local enterprises and institutions.
3. The troops are allowed to independently or through military-civilian cooperation undertake national and local construction projects, transportation tasks, and the state's barren mountains, wastelands, and wastelands for development and afforestation. The required machinery, vehicles, and other equipment are purchased with production funds, and the troops used are reported and approved in accordance with regulations. Military hotels and guesthouses are managed in an enterprise-like manner and can accommodate non-military personnel. The charging standards are differentiated between non-military and non-military personnel. However, guesthouses in military restricted areas are not allowed to be open to the public. Military airports and large docks, with the approval of the State Council and the Central Military Commission, can provide services for civilian use and charge fees in accordance with regulations. All types of hospitals are allowed to treat local wounded. The establishment of wards for the treatment of foreign guests, overseas Chinese, and patients from Hong Kong, Macao, and Taiwan must be reviewed and approved by the military region and the military service. Colleges, scientific research, cultural, design, and other public institutions are allowed to carry out intellectual, technological development, technology transfer, and consulting activities.
4. All foreign economic and trade affairs of the entire military, except for the General Staff Department's Poly Company, the General Political Department's Kelly Company, and the National Defense Science and Technology Commission's Xiaofeng Company, are managed and handled by China Emerging Corporation. Other units are not allowed to establish foreign trade companies, let alone directly conduct trade with foreign countries. The "Interim Regulations" clearly stated that the General Logistics Department is the competent department for implementing these regulations.

Under the leadership of the three headquarters of the CMC, each branch of the military established a joint airline and an ocean shipping company. Subsequently, the major military regions followed closely and established their own economic and trade groups, among which the most representative were Southern Industry and Trade and Northern Industry; driven by their superiors, the various group armies also entered the business world. The income from military operations did improve their training grounds and camp conditions. Subsequently, provincial military regions and military sub-districts also gradually started. The deepening of military business has led to a more complex property structure of military-run enterprises, with joint ventures between different military units, joint ventures between military units and non-military units, and even joint ventures between military units and foreign capital. The military gradually used its military power to exert pressure on the industrial and commercial, tax, customs, forestry and other departments.

== Revocation ==
=== Opposition ===
The military's business activities were strongly opposed by senior generals, led by Zhang Aiping, then Minister of National Defense. At the Standing Committee of the Central Military Commissio, he strongly pointed out the disadvantages of the military's business activities:

If the military and the government engage in business, it will inevitably lead to official corruption, and official corruption will inevitably lead to corruption. Wearing military uniforms to engage in business and profiteering is a disgrace to the military and a tragedy to the country. Encouraging the military to engage in business and make money is tantamount to destroying the Great Wall.

Zhang added: "If we, the people working in the Central Military Commission, cannot even stop this, and if things continue like this, who will be killed in a war in the future? We will be killed first. If we are killed, we will be cursed, disgraced, and infamous! Even our corpses will be tainted for eternity!... When the time comes, you can't blame others for wanting to overthrow you!" However, the voices in support of the military engaging in business outweighed the opposition, and the policy of the military engaging in business was eventually implemented.

After 1987, Zhang Aiping retired and Chi Haotian joined the CMC. Zhang invited Chi to his home, during which he cited a line from Yue Fei's poem Man Jiang Hong that reads "The shame of Jingkang has not yet been avenged" and said, "In order to make up for the shortage of military funds, the emperors of the Song dynasty promoted the strategy of letting the army engage in business. As a result, the military was neglected and military discipline was lax. Facing a small country like Xixia, they were defeated again and again. When the Jin army invaded, the central government lost control and the two emperors Huizong and Qinzong were captured. This is the 'Jingkang Shame' in history." Zhang's talk about "drinking poison to quench thirst" shocked Chi. After Zhang's death, Chi wrote an article "Standing Up to Heaven, and Chasing the Wind and Clouds with Heroic Spirit" to recall this incident.

=== Cessation ===
According to the situation reflected over the years, doing business is very harmful to the army. According to the documents investigated at that time, the first problem is that doing business distracts the attention of leading cadres and organs at all levels. A considerable number of cadres and troops are engaged in business and do not do their jobs properly, which to a certain extent weakens the army's ability to perform its functions and combat effectiveness. Second, using the gun to engage in business to compete with local governments and the people for profits, the unfairness affects the relationship between the military and the government, and disrupts the national economic order. Third, doing business is prone to corruption, corrupting cadres, and undermining the morale of the troops. The military's commercial interests have expanded rapidly and have developed into a huge network. It involves thousands of loosely connected companies, from hotels, nightclubs, golf courses to airlines, pharmaceutical companies, stock brokers, etc. In addition, some units embezzle normal funds in business, which is actually a diversion of national defense funds. After deducting the embezzled funds, the actual income is very little, and some are even negative.

After Jiang Zemin became the CMC Chairman, he began to adopt a method of gradual contraction and phased rectification under the advice of Vice Premier Zhu Rongji and Vice Chairmen Zhang Wannian and Chi Haotian. In 1991, the CMC stipulated that combat units at the division level and below were not allowed to run businesses. On 19 December 1993, the CMC decided that combat units below the army level were not allowed to engage in business and issued the "Decision on the Rectification and Reform of Production and Operation", requiring that "based on the overall interests of the Party and the country and the long-term development of the army, we must resolutely rectify and reform production and operation, straighten out relations, promote benefits and eliminate disadvantages, and ensure the healthy development of production and operation in the army".

By January 1995, enterprises of combat units below the army level, enterprises run by departments, political affairs, logistics and other organs of major military region and deputy major military region level units, and enterprises run by the second-level departments of the three headquarters were all put under centralized management in accordance with regulations. All soldiers and equipment sent out by various units for labor services have been withdrawn. Various types of mechanical construction teams and transport teams have been reorganized and reduced, and are under the unified management of major units. The army originally had 15,327 enterprises and more than 860,000 employees. Through rectification, the number of enterprises has been reduced by 6,238, accounting for 40.7% of the total; the number of employees has been reduced by more than 60,000.

In 1995, the CMC decided to conduct a cleanup and rectification of the military's production and business activities in coastal economically developed areas and special economic zones. In early 1996, the CMC decided to further clean up and rectify the production and business of the entire army, divest local affiliated enterprises, and clean up and control cross-regional operations. In March 1998, the CMC decided that non-combat troops would not engage in production and business. In July 1998, the Central Committee of the Chinese Communist Party decided to focus on combating smuggling activities across the mainland. It was discovered that some units and individuals in the army and armed police forces were also involved in smuggling activities. Subsequently, the CMC decided to thoroughly investigate and stop all business activities of the army and armed police forces.

On 22 July 1998, Jiang Zemin, Chairman of the Central Military Commission, wrote a letter stating:

Wannian, Haotian and other comrades of the Military Commission: ... It is now late at night and I am deeply disturbed by the corruption reported by the masses in recent times... The military must stop all business activities and immediately start to clean up all kinds of business companies run by military units. We must act vigorously and resolutely, but of course we must also work meticulously.

On the same day, Jiang Zemin gave a clear conclusion at the meeting on combating smuggling in the entire army: the PLA and the armed police force should stop all business activities and “all be paid by the government” from January 1 next year. Subsequently, the Central Committee and the CMC both set up leading groups for the army to clean up business enterprises. In October 1998, the CCP Central Committee, the State Council, and the Central Military Commission held a meeting on the military, armed police force, and political and legal organs no longer engaging in business activities and adopted the “Implementation Plan for the Military and Armed Police Forces to No Longer Engage in Business Activities”. Subsequently, the General Staff Headquarters, the General Political Department, the General Logistics Department, and the General Armaments Department jointly issued the “Opinions on Implementing the Implementation Plan for the Military and Armed Police Forces to No Longer Engage in Business Activities”.

Hu Jintao, then a member of the Politburo Standing Committee, served as the leader of the leading group for the military, armed police, and political and legal organs to stop engaging in business activities. Hu said:

We must have a deep understanding of this issue from the perspective of what Comrade Deng Xiaoping said about whether the Party and the country will change, and from the perspective of what Comrade Jiang Zemin said about preventing the danger of the Party and the country being destroyed. This issue is not something that can be dealt with at will, but has reached the point where it must be dealt with; it is not something that can be dealt with slowly, but has reached the point where it must be dealt with urgently and vigorously.

By December 1998, the military had transferred 2,937 enterprises to the national and local governments, with total assets of 80.4 billion yuan, net assets of 24.1 billion yuan, and 209,000 employees. 3,928 enterprises were closed down, with total assets of 15.1 billion yuan, net assets of 6.4 billion yuan, and 104,000 employees. All of them had ceased operations. The 258 security enterprises and 1,088 welfare enterprises that were retained were reviewed and approved in accordance with policy regulations, thus achieving the strategic decision to completely decouple the military and armed police forces from operating enterprises by the end of 1998. On 15 December 1998, the People's Liberation Army and the People's Armed Police completed their separation from all business enterprises.

On 23 April 2009, Jiang Zemin visited the China United Engineering Corporation (formerly the Second Design Institute of the Ministry of Machinery Industry in Hangzhou where he had worked. During a discussion with the cadres and staff of the company, he mentioned his contributions to the central government.

I have done nothing else in the past ten years since I came to Beijing. I have done three things. One is to establish a socialist market economy. The second is to include Deng Xiaoping Theory in the Party Constitution. The third is the "Three Represents". If there is any achievement, it is that the military is not allowed to engage in business. This has a great impact on the fate of the military... I am very ashamed to say that I have done a small amount of work. Thank you all!

=== Cessation of paid services ===
The military's business activities were curbed after 1998. Some enterprises and other units of the military and armed police were transferred to local governments without compensation, but a part of them continued to operate in the name of "paid services". This special scope was concentrated in military and armed police hospitals. In November 2009, with the approval of the CMC, the four headquarters studied and formulated the "Opinions on Strengthening the Management of Paid Services Provided by Military Units to the Outside World" and issued it to the entire army and armed police for implementation. In 2010, the Leading Group for the Management of Paid Services Provided by the Whole Army was established. The Wei Zexi incident in 2016 and other events have once again led to public opinion calling on the military and armed police to completely stop providing paid services.

On 12 July 2019, Vice Premier Han Zheng announced at a summary and commendation meeting on the work of completely stopping the military's paid services that the task of completely stopping the military's paid services had been basically completed and the goal of the military not engaging in business activities had been basically achieved.

== Companies ==
Name	Affiliate	Establishment	Notes	Ref.
China New Era Group	General Armaments Department of the People's Liberation Army	1980	Reorganized with China Energy Conservation Investment Corporation to become China Energy Conservation and Environmental Protection Group Corporation in 2010	
China Poly Group	General Armaments Department of the People's Liberation Army	1984		
China Kelly Group	General Logistics Department of the People's Liberation Army	1984		
China Ocean Airlines	People's Liberation Army Navy	1985	Incorporated into China National Machinery Industry Corporation in 2008	
China United Airlines	People's Liberation Army Air Force	1986	Reorganized by the Shanghai Airlines and China Aviation Supplies Import & Export Group Corporation in 2004	
China Xinxing Group	General Logistics Department of the People's Liberation Army	1989	Merged into China General Technology Group in 2009	
Beijing Sihuan Pharmaceutical Factory	Institute of Toxicology and Pharmacology, Academy of Military Medical Sciences	1989	Soon after it was transferred to Beijing in 1999, it became a subsidiary of Zhongguancun Technology and was renamed Huasu Pharmaceutical in 2007.	
China Tianlong Industrial Corporation	Logistics Department of the Second Artillery Corps	1990		
Sanjiu Group	General Logistics Department of the People's Liberation Army	1991	Merged into China Resources Group and became China Resources Sanjiu in 2008	
China Huandao Group	Ministry of Public Security	1992	Merged into China Chengtong Holdings Group in 2006	
Nanjing Jinling Pharmaceutical Group	Logistics Department of the Nanjing Military Region	1995	Jinling Pharmaceutical Co., Ltd.	
Great Wall CDMA Test Network	Communications Department of the General Staff of the People's Liberation Army	1995	Co-built with Beijing, Shanghai, Xi'an and Guangzhou Post and Telecommunications Administration, transferred to China Unicom in 2001	
China Rongtong Asset Management Group	Multi-service logistics departments, etc.	2020		

== See also ==
- Military-civil fusion
