= Sharon Cheung =

Hong Kong journalist

- 張寶華
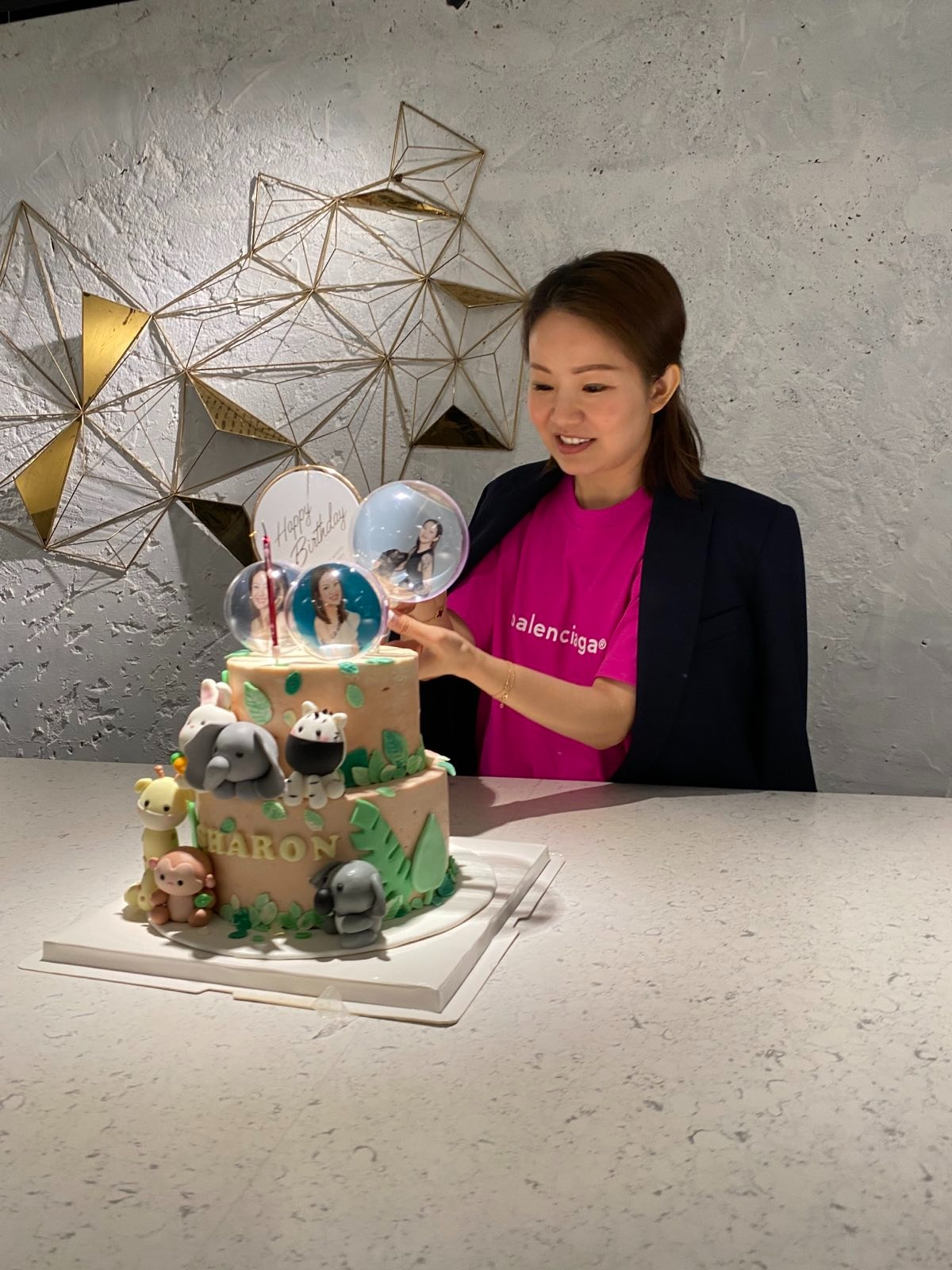
- Pronunciation: [tsœŋ˥ pɔw˧˥wa˩]
- Born: Hong Kong
- Education: Chinese University of Hong Kong, B.A., 1995; Oxford University, Reuters Institute for Journalism, 2005
- Years active: 1995–present
- Known for: interviewing Jiang Zemin

YouTube information
- Channel: Too simple sometimes naive

Sharon Cheung (traditional Chinese: 張寶華; simplified Chinese: 张宝华; Jyutping: Zoeng^{1} Bou^{2}waa^{4}; pinyin: Zhāng Bǎohuá, ) is a Hong Kong–based journalist and entrepreneur. She graduated from the Chinese University of Hong Kong in 1995. She worked for the South China Morning Post from 1995 through 1998 and Hong Kong Cable Television News and Radio Television Hong Kong thereafter.

According to an interview conducted by the Chinese University of Hong Kong's The Varsity newspaper in April 2004, Cheung aspired to be a journalist since watching televised footage of the 1989 Tiananmen Square protests of June 4, 1989. Sharon is quoted as saying “I was impressed by the hero who stood in front of the tanks, bravely striving for democracy.”

On October 27, 2000, Cheung interviewed then-Communist Party General Secretary of China Jiang Zemin. In this interview, after Jiang said he supported Tung Chee-hwa, Cheung questioned whether Jiang Zemin had appointed Tung in the election, which made Jiang Zemin angry and then denounced her and the Media of Hong Kong as "too simple, sometimes naïve" The interview went viral and made her become famous, and has been dubbed as one of the three foundational works (Chinese: 蛤三篇; lit. 'Three pieces about the Toad') of the Chinese internet subculture of "Toad Worship". (Note: "Toad" (蛤; Há) is a nickname for Jiang Zemin, who is said to visually resemble a toad.)

In May 2015, she set up the Lion Rock Spirit Fellowship for journalists from Hong Kong to pursue the Reuters Institute's Journalism Fellowship Programme at the University of Oxford.

Sharon Cheung went on to be a senior vice president of Media Asia Entertainment Group, and is now teaching journalism at the Chinese University of Hong Kong. She advocates for press freedom in China and Hong Kong. In a 2004 interview, Cheung said “the mainland government sees the media as a propaganda tool, to promote its views. However, the Hong Kong government considers the media to be watchdogs that supervise what the government does.”

Cheung is now an entrepreneur and works to advise firms on their new media strategies.

== See also ==
- Moha (meme)
- Freedom of the press in China
