= Moha (meme) =

Internet meme spoofing Jiang Zemin

A toad-worship logo. The glasses and two points represent the face of Jiang Zemin. The Latin letters below stand for "naïve", from Jiang's statement in English on the behavior of Hong Kong journalists.

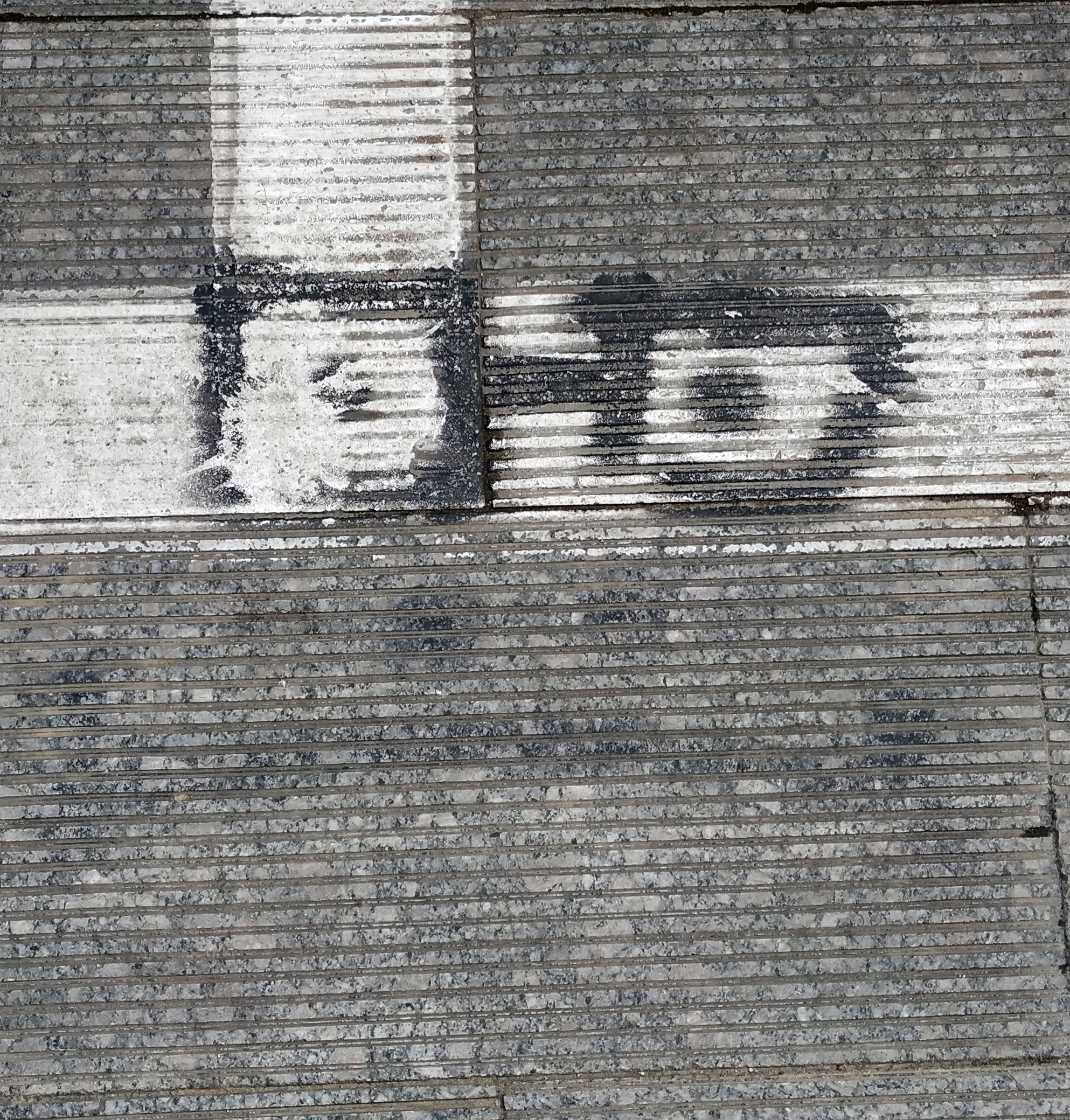
A toad-worship graffiti on a street in Shandong Province, China

Moha (Chinese: 膜蛤; pinyin: Mó Há, pronounced [muǒ.xǎ]), literally "admiring toad" or "toad worship", is an internet meme spoofing Jiang Zemin, former General Secretary of the Chinese Communist Party and paramount leader. It originated among the netizens in mainland China and has become a subculture on the Chinese internet. According to another explanation, it comes from China's social media Baidu Tieba. In the culture, Jiang is nicknamed há, or "toad", because of his supposed resemblance to a toad. Netizens who móhá (worship the toad) call themselves "toad fans", "toad lovers" or "toad worshippers" (simplified Chinese: 蛤丝; traditional Chinese: 蛤絲), or "mogicians" (膜法师; 膜法師) which is a wordplay on mófǎshī (魔法师; 魔法師, magician) in Mandarin. (Note: See: Homophonic puns in Mandarin Chinese.)

Another nickname for Jiang is "elder" or "senior" (长者; 長者; Zhǎngzhě), because he once called himself an "elder" or "senior" when he was berating Hong Kong journalist Sharon Cheung who questioned him. A video clip recording this event spread on the internet and led to the rise of the culture, which later greatly rose in popularity around 2014, when Hong Kong was experiencing a period of political instability. Initially, netizens extracted Jiang's quotes from the video and imitated his wording and tone, for parody and insult. However, as the culture developed, some imitations have taken to carrying affection toward him. The quotes for imitation have also evolved to include what he said during his leadership, and in his personal life.

== Origins ==
In October 2000, Chief Executive of Hong Kong, Tung Chee-hwa, went to Beijing to report to Jiang Zemin. On October 27, 2000, when Jiang Zemin and Tung Chee-hwa met with reporters before the formal talks, Hong Kong journalist Sharon Cheung questioned whether Jiang Zemin had appointed the Hong Kong Chief Executive in the election, which made Jiang Zemin angry.

== Materials ==
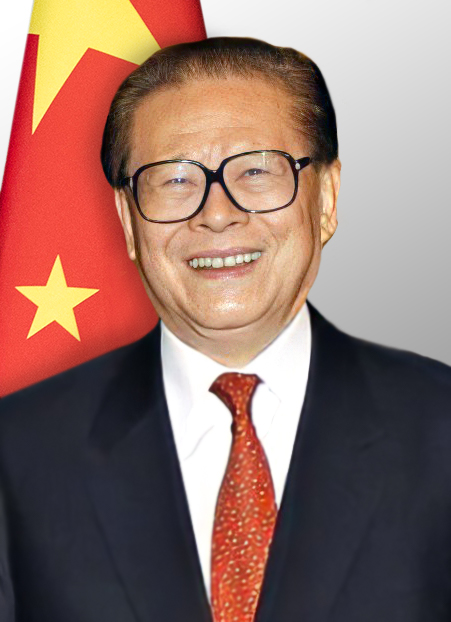
Jiang Zemin in 2002

The materials of moha usually come from three videos about Jiang called "Three Pieces About Toad" (Chinese: 蛤三篇).

1. In the first video, Jiang lashed out at Hong Kong journalist Sharon Cheung in Zhongnanhai when he met with Tung Chee-hwa, Chief Executive of Hong Kong at that time. Cheung asked if Jiang supported Tung's campaign for Chief Executive, which Jiang affirmed. Cheung then asked if it meant the Chinese government had already decided internally to re-appoint Tung. This angered Jiang, and he criticized her for twisting his words to "make big news." Jiang then continued to criticize the Hong Kong media on the whole, claiming that they need to learn to ask more meaningful questions, stating that "Mike Wallace of the US is at a much higher level than you are", referring to a 2000 interview Jiang gave with 60 Minutes.
2. The second is the interview by American journalist Mike Wallace that Jiang referred to in the previous video. In this interview, Wallace and Jiang talked about many controversial subjects, such as democracy and dictatorship in China, freedom of the press, Falun Gong, and the 1989 Tiananmen Square protests.
3. The third video was recorded when Jiang visited the China United Engineering Corporation, where he had previously worked for some years, in April 2009, and recalled his experience. He also spoke about Deng Xiaoping's decision to appoint him as leader of China, and what he considered his achievements during his years of leadership.

There is also a heavy focus on elements of Jiang's appearance as well, in particular his very large and thick-rimmed glasses, slicked back hair, high-waisted trousers, and unusually wide smile. Toad worshippers also extract some sentences from these videos for spoofing like "too young, too simple, sometimes naive" (originally in English).

== See also ==
- Chinese internet memes
- Rubao culture
- Bushism
- Pepe the Frog
