= Neko Atsume =

2014 video game

Neko Atsume: Kitty Collector
- Developer: Hit-Point
- Composer: Ryo Shintani
- Platforms: iOS, Android, Nintendo 3DS
- Release: WW: 20 October 2014
- Genre: Virtual pet
- Mode: Single-player

Neko Atsume: Kitty Collector (Japanese: ねこあつめ; "Cat Collection") is a mobile cat-collecting game developed by Hit-Point Co, Ltd. for iOS and Android, released on October 20, 2014.

== Gameplay ==
Cats will interact with objects when they visit a player's yard.

Gameplay revolves around the player purchasing food, cat toys, and furniture to attract a variety of cats to their home. The player can watch cats interact with objects, take photos of them which can be saved in an album, and receive gifts of fish and mementos from them.

Cats will leave the player either silver or gold "niboshi" (にぼし, small dried sardines), called "fish" in the English version, after leaving the yard. Players can also enter a daily password to receive a random amount of silver or gold fish. After five daily passwords are entered, the player will receive a free can of "Ritzy Bitz (3 gold fish)" or "Sashimi boat (50 gold fish)" (high-quality food). The fish can be used to purchase new types of food and goods, remodels, as well as extensions to the yard. Cats may leave collectible "mementos" for the player.

After purchasing the initial expansion to the garden, the player can then purchase a remodel for their yard. Players have the option to remodel their yard to one of seven different styles: Original, Zen, Rustic, Modern, Western, Sugary, or Cafe.

There is no end game and cats will continue to come as long as the player puts out food for them.

The game is free to play, though additional fish are available for purchase.

=== Cats ===
As of version 1.15.0, there are 86 cats for the player to collect. Among these, 26 are considered "rare cats" and only appear when certain items and foods are placed in the yard. Each cat has a unique name, personality, and appearance (e.g. the heterochromiac Pepper). The player may rename the cats after they have encountered them. Rare cats have a unique interaction with their items. Many of the rare cats in the English version of the game are named after famous people, both fictional and non-fictional, with the names of the cats being puns, like Lady Meow Meow (Lady Gaga), Mr. Meowgi (Mr. Miyagi), Chairman Meow (Chairman Mao), Guy Furry (Guy Fieri), Saint Purrtrick (Saint Patrick), Xerxes IX (Xerxes I), Hermeowne (Hermione Granger), Billy the Kitten (Billy the Kid), Bengal Jack (John Rackham), and Joe DiMeowgio (Joe DiMaggio, complete with megaphone and baseball).

== Development ==
Yutaka Takazaki, the developer of the game, said that his goal was to create a game that even children could enjoy without a significant investment of skill or time. While he loves cats himself, he has said that "to be honest, I do not know why this game is so popular." The game "was made between the development of other applications." Originally, it was software for players who like cats to just watch and enjoy, and could be completed in 2–3 weeks for free. Takazaki says, "We're not going to put cheats or complexity in it, and we would like to pursue a game that can be enjoyed with only simple operations."

== Release ==
On October 30, 2015, an English version of the game, titled Neko Atsume: Kitty Collector, was released on the Android and iOS app stores. As of version 1.4.5, players can switch between the Japanese and English versions of the game any time they want by using the in-game menu. Even before the English version, guides were written for English-speaking users to play the game.

In version 1.5.5, there is a chance that the player's yard will be covered in snow. The snow event typically lasts for 24 hours and changes the appearance of the yard as well as the background music. The player also has the opportunity to get a new rare cat, Frosty. Version 1.6.0 was released on March 24, 2016. This version added two new common cats and two new rare cats, more toys, and introduced the "gallery" where players can buy wallpapers for their phones with gold fish. Version 1.7.0 was released on July 14, 2016. This version added three more cats (two common and one rare), more toys, and more wallpapers. Version 1.8.0 was released on October 13, 2016. This version added two new common cats, more toys, and a new remodel. Version 1.9.0 was released on December 15, 2016. This version added new toys, one rare cat, and enabled snow days like version 1.5.5. Version 1.10.0 was released on July 20, 2017. This version added two new common cats, a rare cat, and more toys. Version 1.11.0 was released on December 22, 2017. This version added one new common cat and more toys.

In September 2017, developer Hit-Point announced Neko Atsume VR, a virtual reality version of the game available for the PlayStation 4 video game console. It supports the PlayStation VR headset and was released in Japan on May 31, 2018 with an international release following in August 2021.

In October 2024, the developer Hit-Point released the game Neko Atsume 2, the sequel to Neko Atsume. Similar to its parent game, Neko Atsume 2 is also free to play and on iOS and Android. As of 2026, Neko Atsume has not received an update since late 2024.

== Reception ==
By May 2015, the game had achieved 4 million downloads for Android and iOS combined. On August 20, 2015, Neko Atsume won the CEDEC Awards for best game design. As of December 4, 2015, the game has achieved 10 million downloads. In January 2016, the game was honored as one of the Top 5 Mobile Games of 2015 by GameSpot, who cited the game as "intensely quirky" and "increasingly compelling."

On September 15, 2015, Google and Hit-Point teamed up for Game Week with Google Play to produce a live video event called Real Neko Atsume (リアルねこあつめ), which was broadcast on YouTube from a cat café in Osaka.

In February 2016, Petio Corporation released toys for the game, designed to be played with by real cats. Later on, some toys were discontinued.

== Film adaptation ==
A Japanese movie 「ja:ねこあつめの家」(Neko Atsume no ie, "The House of Cat Collection") based on Neko Atsume, was released on April 8, 2017. The movie is directed by Masatoshi Kurakata and distributed by AMG Entertainment. The plot is mainly about a novelist struggling with writer's block, who moves to a small house in the country that turns out to be a cat magnet. As he furnishes his yard with items to make their lives more comfortable and starts working at the local shop, his capacity to write begins to revive itself.

== Spin-offs ==
- Kamen Rider Atsume, a spin-off featuring Kamen Rider characters. Released March 2016.
- Spoon Pet Atsume, a spin-off featuring Sega Toys's "Spoon Pet" characters.

== See also ==
- Travel Frog
