= Revitalize the country through science and education =

People's Republic of China development strategy

Revitalize the country through science and education (Chinese: 科教兴国; pinyin: Kējiào xīngguó) is a strategy and guiding principle first implemented by the People's Republic of China in the mid-1990s. The Chinese Communist Party (CCP) proposed to place science and education at an important position in economic and social development. This strategy was formally proposed by CCP general secretary Jiang Zemin.

== History ==
In 1977, Deng Xiaoping proposed that science and education should become important factors for China to catch up with the world's advanced level. This was regarded as the prototype of the strategy of rejuvenating the country through science and education. In 1985, Deng required party committees and governments at all levels to attach importance to education and science and technology. In 1988, Deng stated that "science and technology are the primary productive forces." The 863 Program and the 973 Program are considered to be in line with the idea of rejuvenating the country through science and education.

On May 6, 1995, the CCP Central Committee and the State Council of China first proposed the strategy of rejuvenating the country through science and education. This strategy was formally proposed by CCP General Secretary Jiang Zemin. At the Fifth Plenary Session of the 14th CCP Central Committee held that year, the authorities listed the strategy of rejuvenating the country through science and education as an important policy in the "Proposal on Formulating the Ninth Five-Year Plan for National Economic and Social Development and the Long-Term Objectives for 2010". In 1997, the strategy of rejuvenating the country through science and education was included in the report of the 15th CCP. In 1999 Premier Zhu Rongji once again emphasized the importance of rejuvenating the country through science and education at the Second Session of the 9th National People's Congress. The report of the 20th CCP National Congress still emphasized the strategy of rejuvenating the country through science and education.

=== Science and technology ===
The CCP has established a mechanism to commend and motivate scientific and technological personnel. In September 1999, the CCP Central Committee, the State Council, and the Central Military Commission awarded Yu Min and 23 other scientific and technological personnel the Two Bombs and One Satellite Medal of Merit. In 2000, the National Highest Science and Technology Award was established.

=== Education ===
On March 18, 1995, the third session of the 8th National People's Congress passed the Education Law of the People's Republic of China. The PRC further increased its investment in education and successively implemented the Project 211 and the Project 985.
