= Cessation of paid services by the Chinese military =

Chinese Communist Party policy

The comprehensive cessation of paid services by the army and armed police forces was an effort by the Chinese Communist Party (CCP) to completely stop paid services by the People's Liberation Army (PLA) and People's Armed Police as part of the People's Republic of China's Deepening National Defense and Military Reform.

== Background ==
Paid services provided by the military and armed police force refer to the use of military and armed police force resources to protect the military and armed police force, while at the same time opening up excess resources to the society to provide paid services. After 1998, the military and armed police force stopped doing business and were no longer allowed to engage in enterprise-style production and operation. Some of the military and armed police force's enterprises and other units were transferred to local governments free of charge, but a portion was retained and continued to operate under the name of “paid services”.

There are more than a dozen major industries involved in the paid services of the military and armed police forces, the most typical of which are military and armed police force hospitals (90% of which provide medical services to local personnel). In addition, there are military and armed police force schools, scientific research institutions, warehouses, docks, and cultural and artistic products. Among them, the military and armed police force hospitals receive insufficient funding and charge for paid services to supplement their income. At the same time, some hospitals also consider training and improving doctors' medical skills. Since the Chinese military was established, its bases were often located in prime locations in the city center. Many military units rented street-side properties to local private individuals for use as shops, guesthouses, and hotels. When the real estate industry boomed, the rents were generous, but the flow of funds was not completely open and transparent.

The paid services of the military and armed police have been operated beyond their scope, and some illegal and disorderly behaviors have occurred, turning the assets of the military and armed police into the assets of a certain group or enterprise in disguise, thus turning them into personal interests. However, the assets of the military and armed police are used free of charge, and such problems are not allowed to exist, otherwise it is easy to cause the loss of assets of the military and armed police. At the same time, paid services are also easy to cause uneven welfare treatment within the military and armed police, thus affecting the stable development of the troops.

== Prelude ==
During Hu Jintao's tenure as CCP General Secretary and Chairman of the Central Military Commission, he attached great importance to the management of the military's paid services to foreign countries. Hu Jintao and the Central Military Commission (CMC) successively issued a series of decision-making instructions. However, the supervision and management of some units and departments are still not strict enough, resulting in the military's paid services to foreign countries still having problems such as some industries and units expanding their scale, excessively pursuing economic interests, and misusing the income from paid services.

In November 2009, with the approval of the Central Military Commission, the four headquarters formulated the "Opinions on Strengthening the Management of Paid Services Provided by Military Units to Foreign Parties" and distributed it to the entire army and armed police force for implementation. The "Opinions" focused on further strengthening and standardizing the management of paid services provided by the military to foreign parties, and put forward 11 specific measures and requirements from four aspects: first, strictly control the scope and scale; second, reform and improve the approval and supervision and management of paid services projects to foreign parties; third, strengthen and improve the management of revenue and expenditure; fourth, strictly implement management responsibilities, establish a leading group for the management of paid services provided by the entire army to foreign parties, and coordinate the establishment of a joint management mechanism between the military and local governments.

On July 21, 2010, the first meeting of the Leading Group for the Management of Paid Services to Foreign Countries was held in Beijing. Liao Xilong, member of the CMC and Director of the General Logistics Department of the People's Liberation Army, stressed in his speech at the meeting that "we must further strengthen and standardize the management of paid services to foreign countries by the military, and promote the implementation of all work related to the management of paid services to foreign countries in accordance with the requirements of reducing the scale, controlling the scope, and strictly managing the work". Chen Yong, Assistant Chief of the General Staff of the People's Liberation Army, Tong Shiping, deputy director of the General Political Department of the People's Liberation Army, Ding Jiye and Gu Junshan, deputy directors of the General Logistics Department of the People's Liberation Army, and Niu Hongguang, deputy director of the General Armament Department of the People's Liberation Army, attended the meeting.

== Process ==
In 2015, with the approval of Xi Jinping, CCP General Secretary and CMC Chairman, “In 2015, we will launch a cleanup and rectification campaign for the entire military’s paid services to foreign countries, and focus on resolving existing violations of discipline and law.” In April 2015, the Leading Group for the Management of Paid Services to Foreign Countries of the entire military issued the “Implementation Plan for Comprehensively Carrying out a Cleanup and Survey of the Military’s Paid Services to Foreign Countries,” deploying preliminary cleanup and survey work, with a focus on identifying issues such as unauthorized revenue generation through foreign services, expansion of project scope, and indiscriminate use of revenue.

In accordance with the requirements of deepening national defense and military reform, military logistics should, in principle, be socialized. Taking hospitals as an example, military logistics resources can be integrated into local hospitals, and military hospitals can pay local hospitals for services; military hospitals should also train talents for local hospitals.

In May 2015, with the approval of the Leading Group for the Management of Paid Services to Foreign Countries by the PLA, a special website on “Cleanup and Rectification of Paid Services to Foreign Countries by the PLA” was officially launched on the Military Comprehensive Information Network to accept complaints and reports.

In March 2016, the Central Military Commission issued a “Notice on the Comprehensive Cessation of Paid Service Activities by the Military and Armed Police Forces”. The notice stated that the CMC planned to stop all paid service activities by the military and armed police forces in stages over a period of about three years. This was the first time that the CMC had clearly defined a timetable for this work.

On March 31, 2016, Yang Yujun, spokesman for the Ministry of National Defense, stated at a regular press conference that the “Notice on the Comprehensive Cessation of Paid Service Activities by the Army and Armed Police Force” clearly stated that the social security tasks such as medical care and scientific research assigned by the state, as well as the state's directive tasks, will be incorporated into the military-civilian integration development system and regulated by innovative policies and systems; military and armed police force hospitals and other medical institutions will continue to provide medical services to local personnel on the premise of completing the medical security tasks of the army and armed police force, and explore new models for inclusion in the national medical security system.

On May 7, 2016, a meeting was held to deploy the pilot task of stopping paid services in the military and armed police forces. Members of the leading group for stopping paid services in the military and armed police forces attended the meeting. This was the first time that the activities of the leading group were publicly reported.

In October 2017, the Ministry of Justice issued the “Notice of the Ministry of Justice on Preparing for a Comprehensive Cessation of Paid Legal Services for the Military and Armed Police Forces”.

In June 2018, the General Office of the Chinese Communist Party, the General Office of the State Council, and the General Office of the Central Military Commission issued the “Guiding Opinions on Deepening the Efforts to Completely Stop Paid Services in the Military”.

On July 12, 2019, Vice Premier Han Zheng announced at a summary and commendation meeting on the work of completely stopping the military's paid services that the task of completely stopping the military's paid services had been basically completed and the goal of the military not engaging in business activities had been achieved.
