= Guo Boxiong =

Chinese general and politician

- 郭伯雄
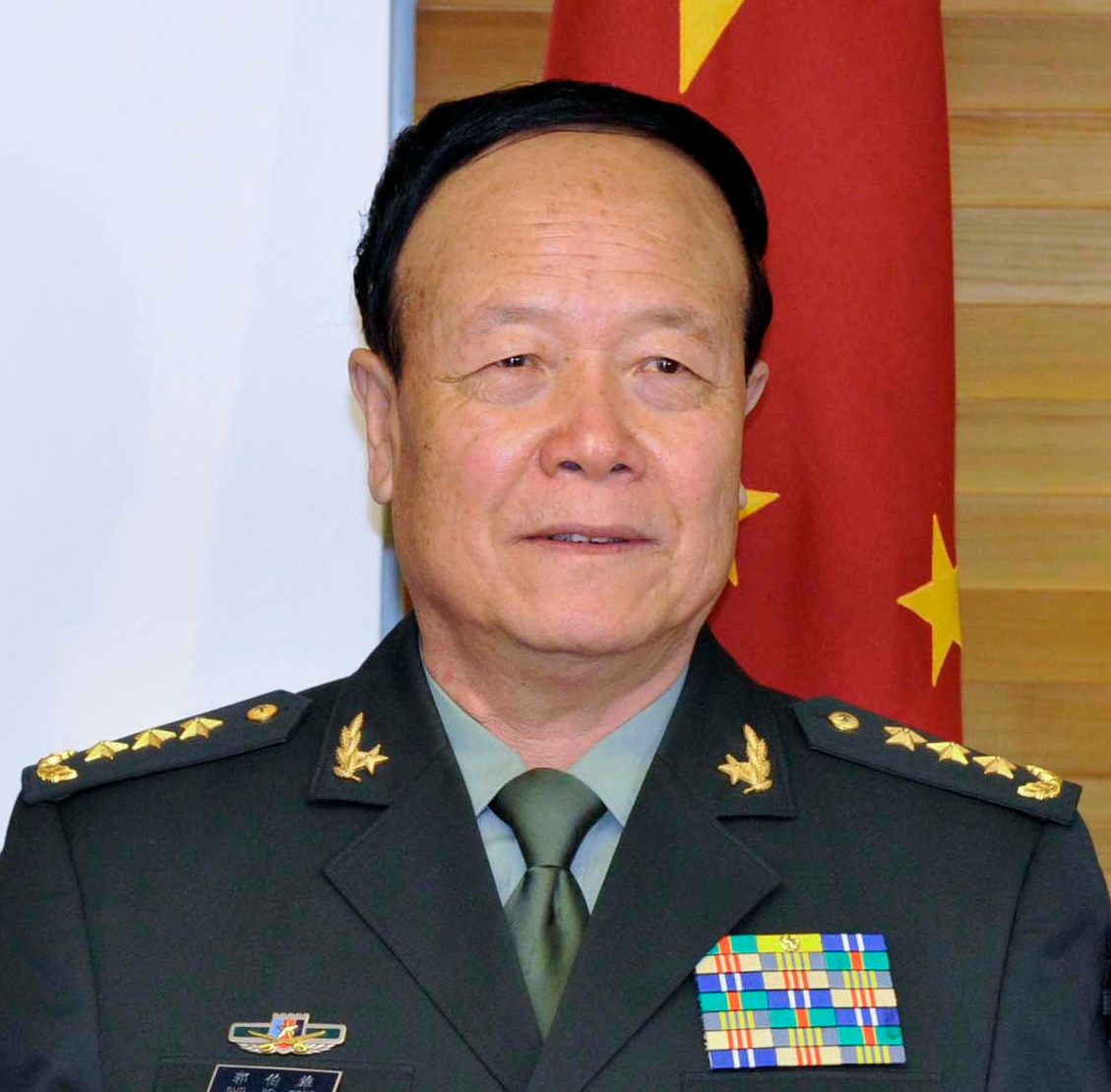
- General Guo Boxiong

Vice Chairman of the Central Military Commission
- In office State Commission: 16 March 2003 – 14 March 2013; Party Commission: 15 November 2002 – 15 November 2012 Serving with Hu Jintao, Cao Gangchuan, Xu Caihou and Xi Jinping
- Chairman: Jiang Zemin; Hu Jintao

Personal details
- Born: July 1942 (age 84) Liquan, Shaanxi, Republic of China
- Party: Chinese Communist Party (1963–2015, expelled)
- Spouse: He Xiulian
- Relations: Guo Boquan; Wu Fangfang (Daughter-in-law)
- Children: Guo Zhenggang; Guo Yonghong
- Parent: Guo Xiaoxi
- Education: PLA Military Academy

Military service
- Allegiance: People's Republic of China
- Branch/service: People's Liberation Army
- Years of service: 1960-2013
- Rank: General (1999–2016, deprived)
- Commands: Beijing Military Region; Lanzhou Military Region

Chinese name
- Chinese: 郭伯雄
Transcriptions
Standard Mandarin
- Hanyu Pinyin: Guō Bóxióng
- Wade–Giles: Kuo Po-hsiung

Guo Boxiong (born July 1942) is a former general of the People's Liberation Army. He served as the vice chairman of the Central Military Commission, China's top military council, between 2002 and 2012. During the same period he also held a seat in the Politburo of the Chinese Communist Party (CCP), China's top decision-making body. He was expelled from the CCP on 30 July 2015. On July 25, 2016, he was sentenced to life imprisonment for bribery.

== Career ==
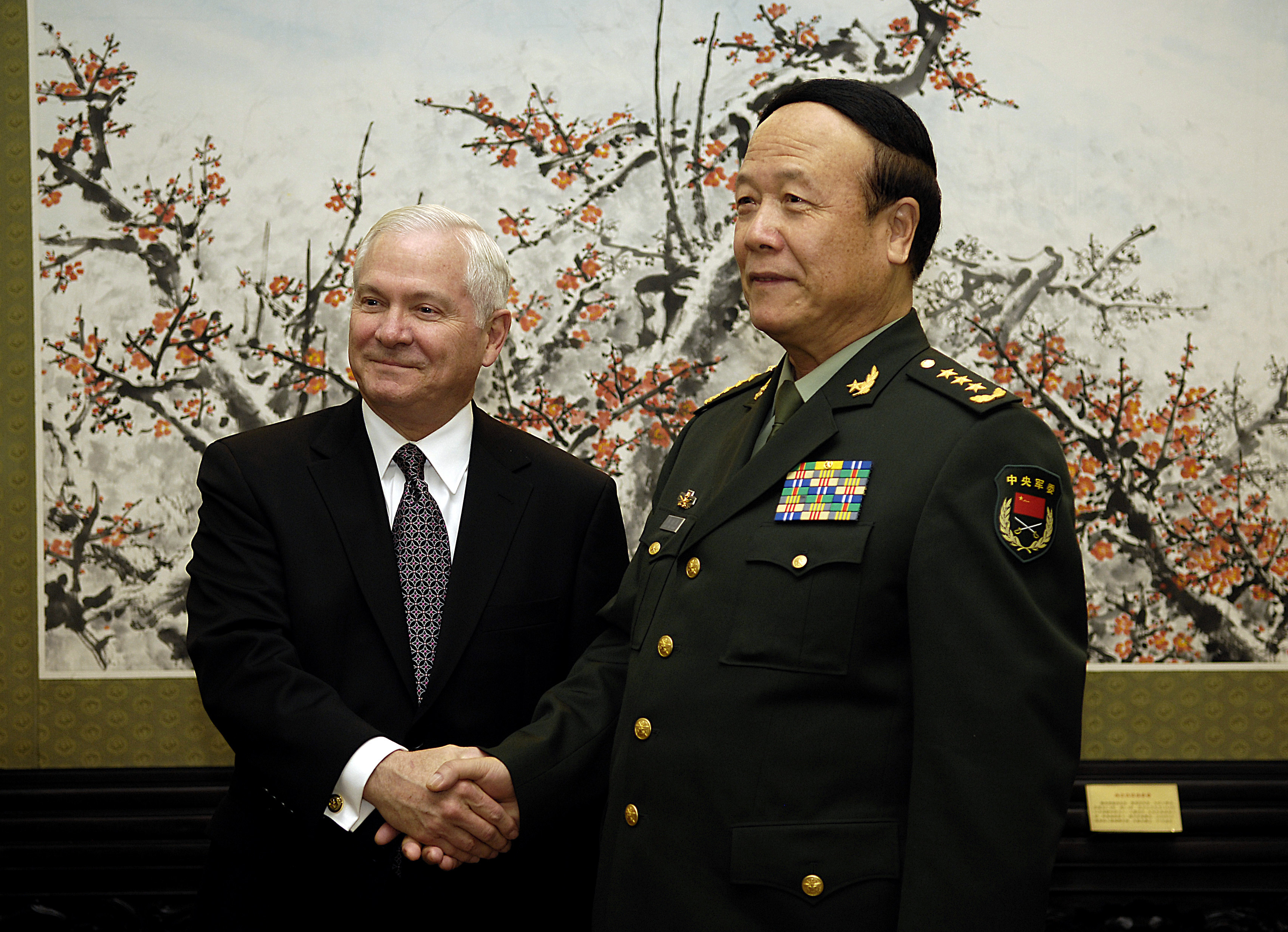
Guo Boxiong met U.S. Defense Secretary Robert Gates in 2007.

Guo was born in Liquan County, Shaanxi province in July 1942. In August 1958, Guo, aged 16 and just finished middle school, began working at a military factory in Xingping, Shaanxi province. Guo joined the People's Liberation Army in 1960. Two years later, he joined the Chinese Communist Party. Guo was trained at China's National Defense University and the Xi'an Army Academy in People's Liberation Army Military Academy where he graduated.

Guo earned a series of promotions in the 1970s. In the 55th Division of the 19th Army, Guo rose from a soldier to chief of staff of the 55th Division by 1982. By 1983 Guo was chief of staff of the 19th Army until 1985, when he became deputy chief of staff of the Lanzhou Military Region after a major re-organization of the PLA that took place under Deng Xiaoping. Afterwards Guo became commander of the 47th Group Army for three years. In 1993 Guo became deputy commander of the Beijing Military Region, the heart of China's defense establishment, and in 1997 commander of the Lanzhou Military Region. In September 1999, Guo became a member of the Central Military Commission, deputy chief of staff, and was also promoted to the rank of General (the highest rank in the army).

In 2002, at the 16th National Congress of the Chinese Communist Party, Guo became the member of Politburo and the vice-chairman of the Central Military Commission (CMC), serving alongside Hu Jintao, who became the General Secretary of the Chinese Communist Party at the same Congress. The Vice-Chairmanship of the CMC is the highest executive position given to military officers. Guo served for ten years in the role.

During their tenures, Guo and Xu Caihou sought to minimize Hu's authority on the CMC by concealing information, selectively reporting important information, and consolidating their influence over the personnel appointment process. They also sought to marginalize Xi Jinping, Hu's apparent successor.

Guo retired from the Politburo in 2012 and the Central Military Commission in 2013.

== Investigation ==
After Guo's retirement, Xi Jinping, the CCP General Secretary and supreme commander of the PLA, began a far-reaching anti-corruption campaign. Guo was subject of intense rumours surrounding possible involvement with corruption during his time in office, particularly in overseas Chinese media. Guo and his former colleague of the same rank, retired general Xu Caihou, attended a new year's gala in early 2014, signalling that both may have "weathered the storm". However, shortly thereafter, in the summer of 2014, as part of the fallout of the Gu Junshan case, Xu was court-martialed and expelled from the party. After Xu's fall, Guo was euphemistically referred to in Chinese-language media as the "Northwest Wolf" (西北狼), an oblique reference to Xi Jinping's slogan to "crack down on 'tigers' and 'flies'." Sensing impending doom, friends from Guo's hometown visited Guo in Beijing, urging him to "clarify the situation to the authorities" to avoid the same fate as Xu. In response, Guo reportedly said, "some things cannot be easily clarified."

In February 2015, Guo's son, Guo Zhenggang, a rear admiral in the PLA Navy, and his wife, were detained for investigation by military authorities in connection to business and real estate dealings. This was followed by reports in international media that Guo himself was also undergoing investigation. On March 5, in response to a reporter's question about whether Guo Boxiong was under investigation, the party's main anti-corruption crusader in the military, General Liu Yuan, responded simply with the phrase "你懂的" (that is, "I think you know what I mean.")

After approval from the Politburo of the Chinese Communist Party, Guo was placed under investigation on April 9, 2015, by the Commission for Discipline Inspection of the Central Military Commission. On July 30, following another Politburo meeting, the Central Commission for Discipline Inspection, the party's top anti-corruption body, released a statement charging Guo with taking bribes personally and through his family in exchange "for aiding in the promotion [of officers]." In addition to corruption, Guo and Xu's alleged deliberate violations of the Central Military Commission's Chairman Responsibility System were deemed as major issues. Guo was duly expelled from the Chinese Communist Party and his case moved to military prosecution authorities for further processing.

Guo was the fourth member of the 17th Politburo of the Chinese Communist Party to be expelled from the Communist Party (the first three were Bo Xilai, Zhou Yongkang, and Xu Caihou).

On July 25, 2016, Guo was sentenced to life imprisonment for bribery.

== Personal life ==
Guo Boxiong has a brother, Guo Boquan (郭伯权) born in 1961, who, until 2015, headed up the Department of Civil Affairs of Shaanxi province and a former official in the city of Weinan. Boquan was reportedly detained by the authorities for investigation in March 2015, though it seemed that he was able to maintain his position following Guo Boxiong's investigation. Guo Boxiong has a son, Guo Zhenggang, who was a major general in the People's Liberation Army, who held a leading military post in Zhejiang province; Zhenggang was also detained for investigation in February 2015.

Military offices
Preceded by Qian Shugen	Commander of the 47th Group Army; 1990–1993	Succeeded by Zou Gengren
Preceded by Zhang Zhijian	Deputy Commander of the Beijing Military Region; 1993–1997	Succeeded by Zang Wenqing
Preceded by Liu Jingsong	Commander of the Lanzhou Military Region; 1997–1999	Succeeded by Li Qianyuan
Preceded by Cao Gangchuan	Deputy Chief of the People's Liberation Army General Staff Department; 1999–2002	Succeeded by Ge Zhenfeng
Party political offices
Preceded by Zhang Wannian/ Chi Haotian	Vice Chairman of the Central Military Commission of the Chinese Communist Party; 2002–2012	Succeeded by Xu Qiliang/ Fan Changlong
Government offices
Preceded by Zhang Wannian/ Chi Haotian	Vice Chairman of the Central Military Commission; 2003–2013	Succeeded by Xu Qiliang/ Fan Changlong
