= Huang Jianhong =

Chinese lieutenant general and politician (1931–2021)

- 黄渐鸿

Director of the Political Department of the Shenyang Military Region
- In office April 1990 – November 1992
- Preceded by: Dai Xuejiang
- Succeeded by: Tan Naida

Personal details
- Born: Dong Feng; 8 February 1931 Luan County, Hebei, China
- Died: 15 March 2021 (aged 90) Shenyang, Liaoning, China
- Party: Chinese Communist Party
- Education: Norman Bethune Health Science Center of Jilin University

Military service
- Allegiance: People's Republic of China
- Branch/service: People's Liberation Army Ground Force
- Years of service: 1946–1994
- Rank: Lieutenant general
- Battles/wars: Chinese Civil War; Korean War

Chinese name
- Simplified Chinese: 黄渐鸿
- Traditional Chinese: 黃漸鴻
Transcriptions
Standard Mandarin
- Hanyu Pinyin: Huáng Jiànhóng

Dong Feng
- Simplified Chinese: 董风
- Traditional Chinese: 董風
Transcriptions
Standard Mandarin
- Hanyu Pinyin: Dǒng Fēng

Huang Jianhong (Chinese: 黄渐鸿; 8 February 1931 – 15 March 2021) was a lieutenant general in the People's Liberation Army of China. He was a delegate to the 7th and 8th National People's Congress.

== Biography ==
Huang was born Dong Feng (董风) in Luan County (now Luanzhou), Hebei, on 8 February 1931. He enlisted in the People's Liberation Army (PLA) in July 1946, and joined the Chinese Communist Party (CCP) in August 1950. After graduating from the Norman Bethune Health Science Center of Jilin University, he served as a doctor in the North China Military Region and participated in the Pingjin campaign, Taiyuan campaign, Fumei campaign, and Ningxia campaign.

After establishment of the Communist State, in 1950, he became a doctor of the Health Department of the 190th Division during the Korean War. He was political commissar of the PLA Dalian Army Academy in May 1986, and held that office until April 1990, when he was appointed director of the Political Department of the Shenyang Military Region. In October 1992, he was promoted to become deputy commander of the military region, a position he held until December 1994.

On 15 March 2021, he died in Shenyang, Liaoning, at the age of 90.

He was promoted to the rank of major general (shaojiang) in September 1988 and lieutenant general (zhongjiang) in July 1993.

Military offices
New title	Political Commissar of the PLA Dalian Army Academy; 1986–1990	Succeeded by Lü Zhi
Preceded by Dai Xuejiang	Director of the Political Department of the Shenyang Military Region; 1990–1992	Succeeded by Tan Naida
