= 16th National Congress of the Chinese Communist Party =

2002 Chinese Communist Party conference

16th National Congress of the Chinese Communist Party 中国共产党第十六次全国代表大会
- The flag of the Chinese Communist Party
- Begins: November 8, 2002
- Ends: November 14, 2002
- Locations: Great Hall of the People, Beijing, China
- Previous event: 15th National Congress of the Chinese Communist Party (1997)
- Next event: 17th National Congress of the Chinese Communist Party (2007)
- Participants: 2,114 delegates
- Major events: Election of the 16th Central Committee and 16th Central Commission for Discipline Inspection
- Leader: Jiang Zemin (Leader of the Chinese Communist Party)

16th National Congress of the Chinese Communist Party
- Traditional Chinese: 中國共產黨第十六次全國代表大會
- Simplified Chinese: 中国共产党第十六次全国代表大会
Transcriptions
Standard Mandarin
- Hanyu Pinyin: Zhōngguó Gòngchǎndǎng Dìshílìucì Quánguó Dàibiǎo Dàhuì

Abbreviated name
- Chinese: 十六大
Transcriptions
Standard Mandarin
- Hanyu Pinyin: Shílìu-dà

The 16th National Congress of the Chinese Communist Party was held in Beijing between November 8 and 14, 2002. It was preceded by the 15th National Congress and was succeeded by the 17th National Congress. 2,114 delegates and 40 specially invited delegates represented the party's estimated 66 million members.

The Party National Congress examined and adopted the amendment to the Constitution of the Chinese Communist Party proposed by the 15th CCP Central Committee, and decided to come into force as from the date of its adoption. An amendment to the Constitution was approved the Party National Congress, with Jiang Zemin's signature ideology of "Three Represents" written into it. The Congress and elected a 356-member 16th CCP Central Committee, as well as a 121-member Central Commission for Discipline Inspection (CCDI). The Congress marked the nominal transition of power between Jiang Zemin and Hu Jintao, who replaced Jiang as General Secretary, and a newly expanded Politburo Standing Committee line-up. The institutional transition would be completed in state organs by the 1st session of the 10th National People's Congress in March 2003. Jiang, however, remained head of the Central Military Commission, therefore in practice, the power transition was not complete.

== Members of the Party Central Committee ==
The 16th CCP Central Committee is composed of 198 full members and 158 alternate members, as well as a 121-member Central Commission for Discipline Inspection.

- The Party General Secretary: Hu Jintao (November 15, 2002, the first plenary session of the 16th CCP Central Committee)
  - Central Committee Secretariat: Zeng Qinghong, Liu Yunshan, Zhou Yongkang, He Guoqiang, Wang Gang, Xu Caihou and He Yong
- 16th CCP Politburo Standing Committee: Hu Jintao, Wu Bangguo, Wen Jiabao, Jia Qinglin, Zeng Qinghong, Huang Ju, Wu Guanzheng, Li Changchun and Luo Gan
- 16th CCP Politburo: Wang Lequan, Wang Zhaoguo, Hui Liangyu (Hui), Liu Qi, Liu Yunshan, Li Changchun, Wu Yi (female), Wu Bangguo, Wu Guanzheng, Zhang Lichang, Zhang Dejiang, Chen Liangyu, Luo Gan, Zhou Yongkang, Hu Jintao, Yu Zhengsheng, He Guoqiang, Jia Qinglin, Guo Boxiong, Huang Ju, Cao Gangchuan, Zeng Qinghong, Zeng Peiyan, Wen Jiabao
- The Central Military Commission
  - Chairman of the Commission: Jiang Zemin
  - vice chairmen of the commission: Hu Jintao, Guo Boxiong and Cao Gangchuan
  - members of the commission: Xu Caihou, Liang Guanglie, Liao Xilong and Li Jinai
- The Central Commission for Discipline Inspection (CCDI)
  - secretary of the CCDI: Wu Guanzheng
  - deputy secretaries of the CCDI: He Yong, Xia Zanzhong, Li Zhilun, Zhang Shutian, Liu Xirong, Zhang Huixin and Liu Fengyan

=== Inner party democracy ===
Out of the nearly 200 Central Committee that was elected by the Congress, it is possible to judge from the number of votes cast in favour the delegates who lacked support in the party. Huang Ju, who was made Vice-Premier in 2003, had the fewest votes in favour, with more than 300 delegates voting against him. Others in the bottom seven, in order from least popular, were Li Changchun (CCP propaganda chief), Zhang Gaoli (then Shandong Party Chief), Jia Qinglin (CPPCC Chairman), Xi Jinping (then Zhejiang Party chief), Li Yizhong, and Chen Zhili (made State Councilor). Shanghai party chief Chen Liangyu ranked tenth from last, while Beijing party chief Liu Qi ranked twelfth from last.

== Policy changes ==
Jiang Zemin's Go Out policy was incorporated into the report of the 16th National Congress. The Report stated that going out was a "major measure taken in a new stage of China's reform and opening movement". Academic Wendy Leutert writes that the Report marked a change from earlier statements on the Go Out policy by proposing a comprehensive and long-term economic shift towards an international focus.

Construction of a social credit system was announced during the 16th National Congress. The central government did not have a specific vision for what a finished system might look like and local governments would be allowed to develop pilot programs that could inform the larger policy approach.

At the Congress, Jiang set a goal of achieving comprehensive xiaokang by 2020. Hu Jintao later reiterated this goal at the 17th Party Congress and the 18th Party Congress.

== See also ==
- Three Represents
- Open Letter to the 16th National Congress of the Chinese Communist Party
- 15th National Congress of the Chinese Communist Party
- 17th National Congress of the Chinese Communist Party
