= Chi Wanchun =

Chinese general

- 迟万春

Political Commissar of the People's Liberation Army General Armaments Department
- In office November 2002 – July 2011
- Preceded by: Li Jinai
- Succeeded by: Wang Hongyao

Political Commissar of the National University of Defense Technology
- In office April 1999 – November 2002
- Preceded by: Zhao Jixiang
- Succeeded by: Huang Xianzhong

Personal details
- Born: April 1946 (age 80) Wendeng County, Shandong, China
- Party: Chinese Communist Party
- Education: Harbin Military Academy of Engineering; PLA Nanjing Political College

Military service
- Allegiance: People's Republic of China
- Branch/service: People's Liberation Army Ground Force
- Years of service: 1965–2013
- Rank: General

Chinese name
- Simplified Chinese: 迟万春
- Traditional Chinese: 遲萬春
Transcriptions
Standard Mandarin
- Hanyu Pinyin: Chí Wànchūn

Chi Wanchun (Chinese: 迟万春; born April 1946) is a retired general of the Chinese People's Liberation Army (PLA). He served as political commissar of the PLA General Armaments Department.

== Biography ==
Born in Wendeng, Shandong, Chi graduated from the Harbin Institute of Military Engineering in 1970, majoring in aeronautic weapons. He joined the Chinese Communist Party in April 1971. In December 1986, he was the director of the political department affiliated with the Logistics Department of the Commission of Science, Technology and Industry for National Defense (COSTIND). In August 1988, he became vice political commissar of the Xi'an Satellite Control Center affiliated with COSTIND. In February 1993, he became political commissar of the Taiyuan Satellite Launch Center. He was promoted to vice director of the political department of COSTIND in 1995, and further promoted to director of the political department of the PLA General Armaments Department in January 1999. He became the political commissar of PLA National Defense University in June 1999. In October 2002, he became political commissar of the PLA General Armament Department.

He attained the rank of major general in July 1993, lieutenant general in July 2000, and full general on June 24, 2006.

Chi was a member of the 16th and 17th Central Committee of the Chinese Communist Party.

Military offices
Preceded by Zhao Jixiang	Political Commissar of the National University of Defense Technology; 1999–2002	Succeeded by Huang Xianzhong
Preceded by Li Jinai	Political Commissar of the People's Liberation Army General Armaments Department; 2002–2011	Succeeded by Wang Hongyao
