= Chi Haotian =

Former Minister of National Defence of China

General Chi Haotian
- 迟浩田; Chih Hao-tien
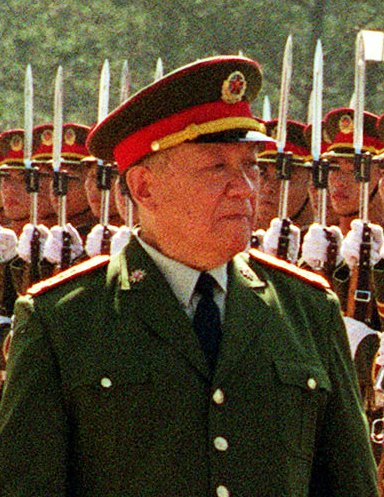

Vice Chairman of the Central Military Commission
- In office Party Commission: 28 September 1995 – 15 November 2002; State Commission: 28 March 1993 – 5 March 2003 Serving with Liu Huaqing, Zhang Zhen, Zhang Wannian and Hu Jintao
- Chairman: Jiang Zemin

State Councilor of China
- In office 29 March 1993 – 17 March 2003
- Premier: Li Peng; Zhu Rongji

8th Minister of National Defense
- In office 29 March 1993 – 17 March 2003
- Premier: Li Peng; Zhu Rongji
- Preceded by: Qin Jiwei
- Succeeded by: Cao Gangchuan

Head of the General Staff Department of the People's Liberation Army
- In office 28 November 1987 – 28 October 1992
- Preceded by: Yang Dezhi
- Succeeded by: Zhang Wannian

Personal details
- Born: 9 July 1929 (age 97) Zhaoyuan, Shandong, Republic of China
- Party: Chinese Communist Party

Military service
- Allegiance: Chinese Communist Party
- Branch/service: PLA Ground Force
- Years of service: 1944–2003
- Rank: General
- Battles/wars: Chinese Civil War; Korean War
- Awards: Order of Liberation (3rd Class; 1955)

Chi Haotian (simplified Chinese: 迟浩田; traditional Chinese: 遲浩田; pinyin: Chí Hàotián; born 9 July 1929), also spelled as Chih Hao-tien, is a retired general of the Chinese People's Liberation Army (PLA) who served as Minister of National Defense and a state councilor from 1993 to 2003, and as a vice chairman of the Central Military Commission (CMC) from 1995 to 2003. A veteran of the Chinese Civil War and the Korean War, he was chief of the PLA General Staff during the military's suppression of the 1989 Tiananmen Square protests.

== Early life ==
Chi was born on 9 July 1929 in a poor mountain village in Zhaoyuan, Shandong. He was one of eleven children, four of whom died young, and his mother sent him to school at the age of seven in the hope that he would become a teacher. In 1941, during the Second Sino-Japanese War, the Imperial Japanese Army carried out a large-scale pacification campaign in the Jiaodong region, with killings, arson and looting in his home area, after which his mother decided to send him to join the army. As a boy, he led his village's children's corps during the Japanese occupation.

== Military career ==
=== Civil War ===
Chi enlisted in the Eighth Route Army in 1944. In May 1947, during the Menglianggu Campaign, he was wounded while leading an assault as a young officer in the 9th Column of the East China Field Army. In the Huaihai campaign in 1948, he was political instructor of the 7th Company of his regiment, known as the "Jinan Heroic Company". During the Shanghai Campaign in May 1949, as political instructor of the 7th Company of the 235th Regiment of the 79th Division, he entered a sewer to reach Suzhou Creek, and with two other soldiers, he captured the command post of a Nationalist colonel.

=== Korean War and the 27th Army ===
During the Korean War, Chi served in the 27th Army of the People's Volunteer Army in North Korea as a battalion political instructor and as deputy director of a regimental political department, and he received a first-class merit citation. From 1950 to 1969, he held various posts in the 79th Division of the 27th Army, and in 1969, he became deputy director of the army's political department.

=== Senior posts ===
In 1973, Chi became deputy political commissar of the Beijing Military Region. He was also a member of the leading group of the PLA Daily and later headed People's Daily. After the 1976 Tangshan earthquake, he was appointed deputy commander of the Tangshan Earthquake Relief Headquarters, which oversaw the PLA's aid to the victims.

He later served as deputy chief of the General Staff and director of its political department, and then as political commissar of the Jinan Military Region. In 1987, he became chief of the General Staff and secretary of its party committee. He became a member of the CMC in 1988 and was promoted to general that year.

=== 1989 Tiananmen Square protests ===
Chi was chief of the General Staff when the PLA enforced martial law in Beijing in May and June 1989 and suppressed the Tiananmen Square protests. Critics, including the US Representative Christopher Smith, have described him as the commanding general at Tiananmen Square.

== Minister of National Defense ==
In March 1993, Chi became a state councilor and Minister of National Defense, and he also chaired the commission that drafted the National Defense Law. He became a vice chairman of the party's CMC in September 1995 and of the state CMC in December 1995. At the 15th Party Congress in 1997, he was elected to the Politburo. He was a member of the 12th, 13th, 14th and 15th Central Committees.

During the Third Taiwan Strait Crisis, which began after the United States allowed the Taiwanese president Lee Teng-hui to visit Cornell University in June 1995. In July 1995, the PLA held missile tests and exercises near Taiwan, launching six surface-to-surface missiles about 100 miles (160 km) from the island, and in August, it held a second round of missile tests and naval exercises. In March 1996, ahead of Taiwan's first popular presidential election, the PLA fired missiles into waters near Taiwan and then held live-fire air and naval exercises. In response, the United States sent two aircraft carrier battle groups, led by USS Independence and USS Nimitz, toward Taiwan. On 7 March 1996, Chi told the Fujian delegation to the National People's Congress that more troops were stationed in the province because China faced a "grim situation" in which Lee was "attempting to split China", and that "we must heighten our vigilance". On 22 March, the day before the election, Chi's planned visit to the United States was postponed. The US Department of Defense and the Chinese government each said that it had taken the initiative in delaying the visit.

In December 1996, Chi visited the United States at the invitation of the Clinton administration, meeting President Bill Clinton at the White House and the Defense Secretary William Perry at the Pentagon, receiving a 19-gun salute and touring military bases. With Perry, he discussed human rights, Hong Kong and American servicemen missing since the Second World War, and he presented items recovered from an American B-24 Liberator bomber that had crashed in Guangxi, China during the Second World War. Republican members of Congress boycotted a breakfast meeting held for him. During the visit, he declined to renounce the use of force against Taiwan. During the visit, Chi said in a speech that no one had been killed in Tiananmen Square itself on 4 June 1989. On 18 December 1996, the House Subcommittee on International Operations and Human Rights, chaired by Smith, held a hearing titled "Was There a Tiananmen Massacre? The Visit of General Chi", at which witnesses criticised the statement.

United States Secretary of Defense William S. Cohen and Mrs. Cohen greeted by Chi Haotian at the Ministry of National Defense Headquarters in Beijing, China (2000)

In February 1998, Chi visited Japan, where he met Prime Minister Ryutaro Hashimoto, and the two countries agreed to begin military exchanges. In October 1999, he visited Syria, where he met the Syrian defence minister Mustafa Tlass and then Israel, where he held talks with the prime minister and defence minister Ehud Barak. In Israel, he reportedly discussed an Israeli upgrade of China's ageing MiG-21 fighters, while Israel was fitting a Russian-built Il-76 aircraft with the Phalcon airborne early-warning radar for China.

In December 1999, Chi stated that war between China and the United States "is inevitable." He emphasized the necessity for China's military to dictate the terms of engagement, asserting, "The issue is that the Chinese armed forces must control the initiative in this war." His remarks suggested that conflict was not only unavoidable but also that China must adopt a proactive stance to ensure strategic superiority.

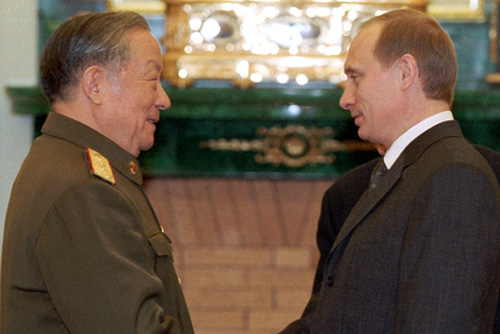
Chi with Vladimir Putin in 2000

In January 2000, Chi held talks in Moscow with the Russian defence minister Igor Sergeyev and met the acting president Vladimir Putin in the first high-level contact between the two countries after the resignation of Boris Yeltsin. Chi reaffirmed China's support for Russia's military campaign in Chechnya, and Putin restated Russia's support for the one-China policy.

== Retirement ==
Chi's term as vice chairman of the CMC ended in March 2003, and Cao Gangchuan succeeded him as Minister of National Defense that month. In retirement, he has been known for his writing and calligraphy, and he has served as an adviser to the documentary series The Founding Generals and to Lei Feng magazine. In May 2017, he attended a ceremony in Linyi marking the 70th anniversary of the Menglianggu Campaign.

In September 2023, a column by Katsuji Nakazawa in Nikkei Asia, citing unnamed sources, reported that Chi had sat silently beside the former vice president Zeng Qinghong at a meeting of party elders with Xi Jinping during the summer retreat at Beidaihe, and described his presence as "silent pressure" on Xi. Some China watchers questioned Nakazawa's earlier report that party elders had criticised Xi at the retreat.

== Personal life ==
Chi met Jiang Qingping, a nurse at the PLA's 100th Hospital in Suzhou, in 1953, and they married at the end of 1956. She later worked as a doctor at the PLA Navy General Hospital, where she retired as head of the radiology department, and she died on 4 June 2023 at the age of 90. They had a son, Chi Xingbei, and a daughter, Chi Xinghong. Chi Xingbei is a major general in the PLA who previously served as political commissar of the logistics department of the PLA Ground Force.

Military offices
Preceded by Ding Laifu	Director of the Political Department of the General Staff of the People's Liberation Army; 1977–1982	Succeeded by Feng Zheng
Preceded by Chen Renhong	Political Commissar of the Jinan Military Region; 1985–1987	Succeeded by Song Qingwei
Preceded by Yang Dezhi	Head of the People's Liberation Army General Staff Department; 1987–1992	Succeeded by Zhang Wannian
Government offices
Preceded by General Qin Jiwei	Minister of National Defense; 1993–2003	Succeeded by General Cao Gangchuan
