= Minister of National Defense (China) =

State Council position in China

Minister of National Defense of the People's Republic of China
- 中华人民共和国国防部部长
- National Emblem of China

- Flag of China

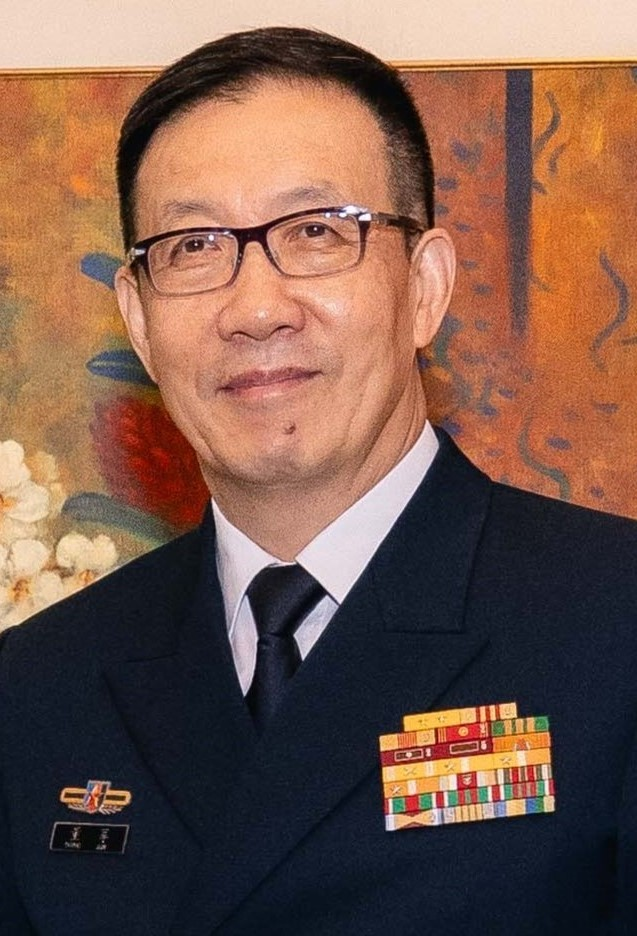
- Incumbent; Dong Jun since 29 December 2023
- Ministry of National Defense
- Status: Provincial and ministerial-level official
- Member of: Plenary Meeting of the State Council
- Reports to: Central Military Commission
- Seat: Beijing
- Nominator: Premier (chosen within the Chinese Communist Party)
- Appointer: President with the confirmation of the National People's Congress or its Standing Committee
- Precursor: Minister of National Defense of the Republic of China
- Formation: 28 September 1954; 71 years ago
- First holder: Peng Dehuai
- Website: eng.mod.gov.cn/xb/Ministry/index.html

The minister of national defense of the People's Republic of China is the head of the Ministry of National Defense and one of the top positions in the State Council. The minister usually is also a member of the Central Committee of the Chinese Communist Party (CCP) and a member of the Central Military Commission (CMC), the top governing body of China's armed forces including the People's Liberation Army (PLA).

Unlike in other countries, the minister does not have command authority over the armed forces, with the post generally used for diplomatic purposes. Nevertheless, until the appointment of the current incumbent, Admiral Dong Jun, the post was always held by a member of the CMC. Dong has been serving in the position since December 2023.

== History ==
Historically, both the position and the ministry carried greater power. In the first decades of the PRC, the ministry included several more departments, all overseen by vice ministers. The minister was held by influential generals, including Peng Dehuai, Lin Biao and Ye Jianying.

The ministry was reformed into its current state in the 1982 constitutional revision. Between 1982 and 2008, the minister usually concurrently served as a vice chairman of the CMC, and was usually a member of the CCP Politburo. In addition, all ministers of National Defense would also be appointed as the state councillor, a position in the State Council newly established in 1982 consisting of high-ranking officeholders. And since all defense ministers are members of the CMC, in official state rhetoric, the ministers of National Defense is to be referred to as the "State Councillor and Minister of National Defense". (Note: (Chinese: 国务委员兼国防部长). Sometimes with their respective position in the CMC added prior to it, in the form of "Vice Chairman (or Member) of the Central Military Commission of the People's Republic of China, State Councillor and Minister of National Defense".) After 2008, holders of the position stopped serving concurrently as a CMC vice chair, further weakening the position.

Among all its officeholders, Geng Biao was the only defence minister with a civil background, having no military rank of the PLA, neither was he a member thereof. Nonetheless, Geng did serve in the Red Army long before PLA’s foundation. With the exception of the aforementioned officeholder, all defence ministers in prior to Wei Fenghe came from the PLA Ground Force. In addition, current officeholder is yet to be appointed as a state councillor, making it the only exception to the aforementioned co-serving norm.

=== Wei Fenghe and Li Shangfu Scandals, 2023–2024 ===
Notably, under the third tenure of the CCP General Secretary and CMC Chairman Xi Jinping, a series of major military scandals occurred from 2023 to June 2024, which eventually saw two of his former defence ministers, Wei Fenghe and Li Shangfu, expelled from the CCP, with their military titles revoked. Prior to this, Li was removed from the office only a couple of months after his appointment in March 2023, causing the position to be briefly vacant from October. This was until Admiral Dong Jun was appointed into the office in December of the same year, making Dong the first PLA Navy officer to become the defence minister. Besides, the PLA Rocket Force, in which Wei was a member, also saw a purge that year, with corruption investigating taking place.

== Process of appointment ==
Officially, the minister is nominated by the premier of the State Council, who is then approved by the National People's Congress or its Standing Committee and appointed by the president.

== Functions ==
The military is under the governance of the CMC, putting the Ministry of National Defense out of the chain of command, the minister is significantly less powerful than his counterparts from other countries, and has no direct command function over the military. The post is generally seen as a diplomatic and ceremonial role, with the minister handling military-to-military ties with other countries. However, until the appointment of the current incumbent, Admiral Dong Jun, the office has always been held by a member of the CMC. Though the minister has historically been assisted by vice ministers, the ministry currently has no vice ministers.

== List of officeholders ==
No.	Portrait	Minister	Took office	Left office	Time in office	Defence branch
1	Peng Dehuai彭德怀	Marshal; Peng Dehuai 彭德怀 (1898–1974)	28 September 1954	17 September 1959	4 years, 201 days	PLA Ground Force
2	Lin Biao林彪	Marshal; Lin Biao 林彪 (1907–1971)	17 September 1959	13 September 1971	12 years, 149 days	PLA Ground Force
Vacant; 13 September 1971 – 17 January 1975
3	Ye Jianying叶剑英	Marshal; Ye Jianying 叶剑英 (1897–1986)	17 January 1975	26 February 1978	3 years, 40 days	PLA Ground Force
4	Xu Xiangqian徐向前	Marshal; Xu Xiangqian 徐向前 (1901–1990)	26 February 1978	6 March 1981	2 years, 345 days	PLA Ground Force
5	Geng Biao耿飚	Geng Biao 耿飚 (1909–2000)	6 March 1981	19 November 1982	1 year, 105 days	None (Note: Formerly Chinese Red Army)
6	Zhang Aiping张爱萍	General; Zhang Aiping 张爱萍 (1910–2003)	19 November 1982	12 April 1988	5 years, 145 days	PLA Ground Force
7	Qin Jiwei秦基伟	General; Qin Jiwei 秦基伟 (1914–1997)	12 April 1988	29 March 1993	4 years, 351 days	PLA Ground Force
8	Chi Haotian迟浩田	General; Chi Haotian 迟浩田 (born 1929)	29 March 1993	17 March 2003	9 years, 353 days	PLA Ground Force
9	Cao Gangchuan曹刚川	General; Cao Gangchuan 曹刚川 (born 1935)	17 March 2003	17 March 2008	5 years, 0 days	PLA Ground Force
10	Liang Guanglie梁光烈	General; Liang Guanglie 梁光烈 (1940–2024)	17 March 2008	16 March 2013	5 years, 0 days	PLA Ground Force
11	Chang Wanquan常万全	General; Chang Wanquan 常万全 (born 1949)	16 March 2013	19 March 2018	5 years, 3 days	PLA Ground Force
12	Wei Fenghe魏凤和	~~General~~ (Note: revoked in June 2024); Wei Fenghe 魏凤和 (born 1954)	19 March 2018	12 March 2023	4 years, 358 days	PLA Rocket Force
13	Li Shangfu李尚福	~~General~~; Li Shangfu 李尚福 (born 1958)	12 March 2023	24 October 2023	226 days	PLA Ground Force
Vacant; 24 October – 29 December 2023
14	Dong Jun董军	Admiral; Dong Jun 董军 (born 1961)	29 December 2023	Incumbent	2 years, 253 days	PLA Navy
