= Cao Gangchuan =

Chinese general

General Cao Gangchuan
- 曹刚川
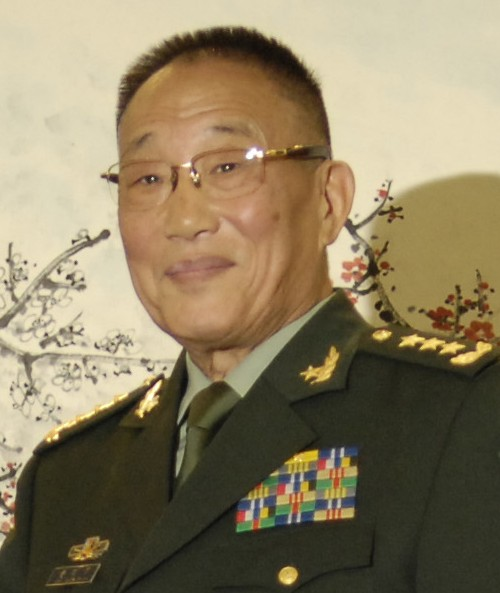
- Cao in 2007

Vice Chairman of the Central Military Commission
- In office State Commission: 16 March 2003 – 14 March 2008; Party Commission: 15 November 2002 – 21 October 2007 Serving with Guo Boxiong, Hu Jintao, and Xu Caihou
- Chairman: Jiang Zemin; Hu Jintao

State Councillor of the People's Republic of China
- In office 17 March 2003 – 17 March 2008
- Premier: Wen Jiabao

9th Minister of National Defence
- In office 17 March 2003 – 17 March 2008
- Premier: Wen Jiabao
- Preceded by: Chi Haotian
- Succeeded by: Liang Guanglie

Head of the People's Liberation Army General Armaments Department
- In office April 1998 – November 2002
- Preceded by: Office established
- Succeeded by: Li Jinai

Personal details
- Born: December 1935 (age 90) Wugang, Henan, Republic of China
- Party: Chinese Communist Party

Military service
- Allegiance: Chinese Communist Party; People's Republic of China
- Branch/service: People's Liberation Army Ground Force
- Years of service: 1954–2008
- Rank: General

Cao Gangchuan (simplified Chinese: 曹刚川; traditional Chinese: 曹剛川; pinyin: Cáo Gāngchuān; born December 1935) is a retired Chinese general who served as Minister of National Defense and a state councilor from 2003 to 2008, and as a vice chairman of the Central Military Commission (CMC). A Soviet-trained ordnance specialist, he spent most of his career in the People's Liberation Army's equipment and arms-trade bodies, and in 1998, he became the first director of the newly established General Armament Department. He was also chief commander of the manned space programme in the years before China's first crewed spaceflight in 2003.

== Early life and education ==
Cao was born in December 1935 in Wugang, Henan. He enlisted in the People's Liberation Army (PLA) in July 1954 and joined the Chinese Communist Party (CCP) in July 1956. From 1954 to 1956, he studied at the PLA's Nanjing No. 3 Artillery Ordnance Technical School and No. 1 Ordnance Technical School, and in 1956, he became an instructor at the latter. After a year at the PLA's Dalian Russian Language School, he studied from 1957 to 1963 at the Felix Dzerzhinsky Artillery Academy in the Soviet Union.

== Military career ==
After returning to China in 1963, Cao worked in the PLA's General Logistics Department, first as an assistant in the ammunition division of its ordnance department and, from 1969, as an assistant in the weapons division of its equipment department. In 1975, he moved to the equipment department of the General Staff Department, where he became a staff officer in the general planning division and, in 1979, its deputy head. He was deputy director of the equipment department from 1982 to 1989 and director of the General Staff's military affairs department from 1989 to 1990. He was promoted to major general in September 1988.

In 1990, Cao became director of the CMC's Office of Military Products Trade, and from 1992 to 1996, he was a deputy chief of the General Staff. He was promoted to lieutenant general in July 1993. From 1996 to 1998, he was minister and party secretary of the Commission for Science, Technology and Industry for National Defense.

=== General Armament Department ===
On April 3, 1998, the CMC decided to establish the PLA General Armament Department, which began operating on April 5, with Cao as its first director and Li Jinai as its political commissar. He was promoted to general in March 1998. In October 1998, he was added to the party's Central Military Commission at the third plenary session of the 15th Central Committee, and in November, he was appointed to the state Central Military Commission. He had been a delegate to the 14th Party Congress and was a member of the 15th and 16th Central Committees.

During this period, Cao was also chief commander of the manned space programme. In 1998, he spoke at the site of a zero-altitude escape test for the programme's spacecraft, and before the launch of Shenzhou 3 in 2002, Jiang Zemin telephoned him to say that he would attend the launch to encourage the team.

== Vice chairman and defence minister ==
At the 16th Party Congress in November 2002, Cao was elected to the Politburo and became a vice chairman of the party's Central Military Commission. In March 2003, he also became a vice chairman of the state Central Military Commission, a state councilor and Minister of National Defense. During Shenzhou 5, China's first crewed spaceflight, in October 2003, the astronaut Yang Liwei spoke to Cao from orbit and told him that he would work hard to accomplish the task.

In October 2003, Cao visited the Pentagon for talks with the US Secretary of Defense, Donald Rumsfeld, the first visit to Washington by a Chinese defence minister since 1996. The agenda included military relations, regional and global security, including terrorism, and North Korea's nuclear programme. In March 2004, he made the first visit to India by a Chinese defence minister in a decade, holding talks with his Indian counterpart, George Fernandes, on confidence-building measures along the border and on military exchanges. The same trip took him to Pakistan.

In August 2005, Cao and the Russian defence minister, Sergei Ivanov, observed Peace Mission 2005, the first major joint military exercise between China and Russia, near Qingdao, and the two agreed that the exercise marked a new level in their countries' strategic partnership. In September 2005, he began a goodwill tour of Central Asia, visiting Tajikistan and Kazakhstan for talks on military and technical cooperation, counterterrorism and drug trafficking. In October 2005, he hosted Rumsfeld in Beijing, five years after a US defense secretary had last visited China, and he called the visit a "big event". At a joint news conference with Rumsfeld, Cao said that an increase in defence spending on the scale suggested by the Pentagon would be "simply impossible", because China was concentrating its resources on economic development and fighting poverty. He gave China's 2005 defence budget as $30.2 billion at the latest exchange rate, calling it "the true budget we have today", and he acknowledged that some funding for equipment development, such as the space launch programme, was not included. The Pentagon had estimated China's defence spending at about $90 billion.

After China destroyed one of its own weather satellites in an anti-satellite missile test in January 2007, Cao told a former Japanese defence chief, Fukushiro Nukaga, that China had no plans for further tests. In August 2007, Cao visited Japan, the first such visit by a Chinese defence minister in almost a decade, and held talks with the Japanese defence minister, Masahiko Kōmura. The two sides agreed to set up a committee on a defence hotline and to arrange the first visit by a Chinese warship to a Japanese port, and Cao invited Japanese observers to a Chinese military exercise. In November 2007, he hosted Robert Gates on his first visit to China as defense secretary, and the two agreed to establish a direct telephone link between their defence establishments, which Chinese state media described as the first such link between the Chinese military and a foreign power. Cao said that technical experts would continue to work on the hotline but gave no date for its opening.

In March 2008, Liang Guanglie succeeded Cao as state councilor and Minister of National Defense.

== Awards and honors ==
- Order of the Friendship of Peoples (Belarus, 11 September 2006)
- Order of Friendship (Russia, 15 July 2008)
- Medal of Pushkin (Russia, 31 October 2007)

Military offices
Preceded by Xing Zhiyong	Head of the Military Affairs Division of the General Staff Department of the People's Liberation Army; 1989–1990	Succeeded by Mao Fengming
New title	Head of the People's Liberation Army General Armaments Department; 1989–1990	Succeeded by Li Jinai
Government offices
Preceded by Ding Henggao	Chairman of Commission of Science, Technology and Industry for National Defense; 1996–1998	Succeeded by Liu Jibin
Preceded by General Chi Haotian	Minister of National Defense; 2003–2008	Succeeded by General Liang Guanglie
