= Fan Changlong =

Chinese Army general

General Fan Changlong
- 范长龙
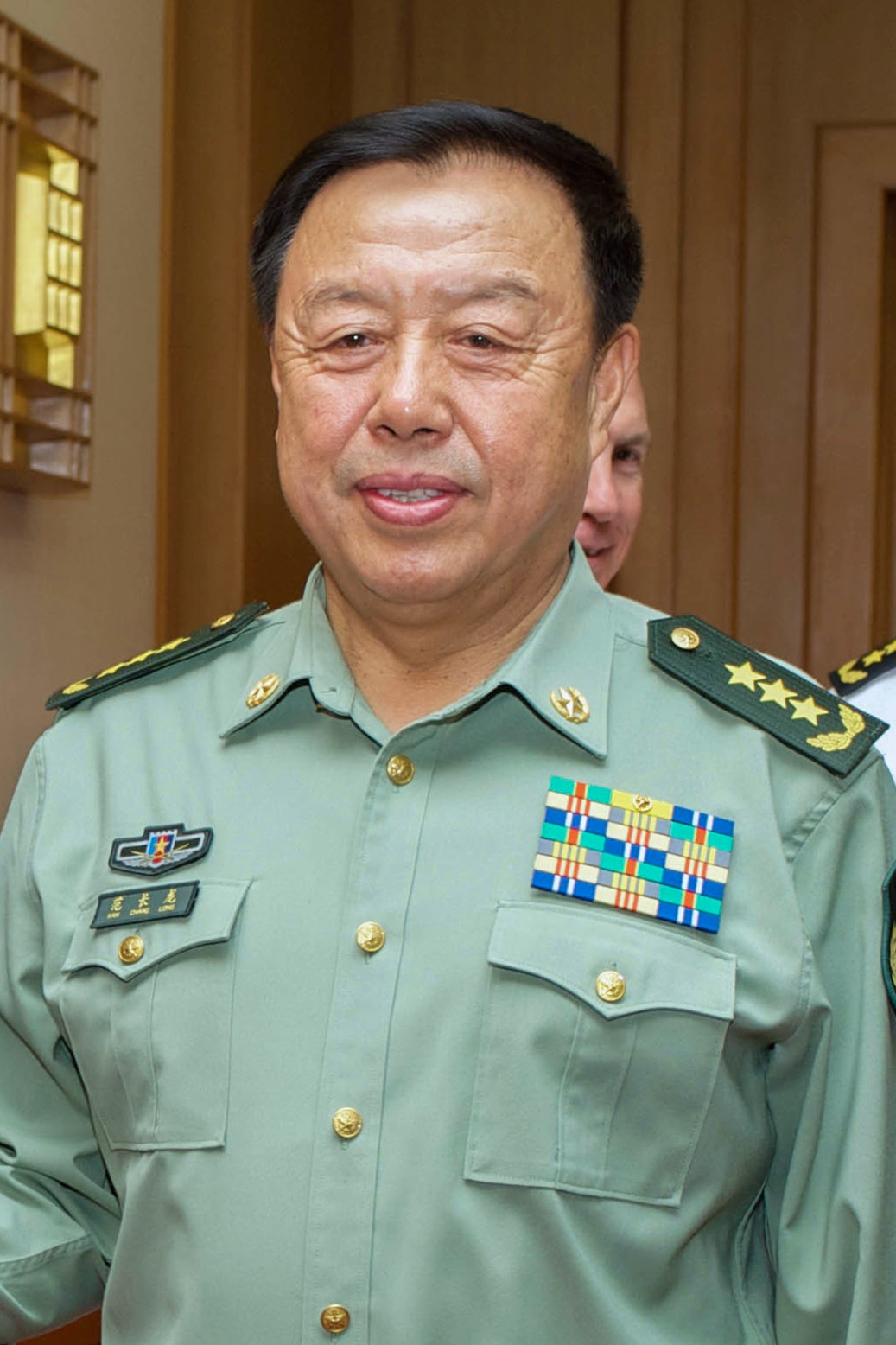
- Fan in 2015

Vice Chairman of the Central Military Commission
- In office State Commission: 16 March 2013 – 18 March 2018; Party Commission: 4 November 2012 – 25 October 2017 Serving with Xu Qiliang
- Chairman: Xi Jinping

Commander of the Jinan Military Region
- In office September 2004 – November 2012
- Preceded by: Chen Bingde
- Succeeded by: Zhao Zongqi

Personal details
- Born: May 1947 (age 79) Dandong, Liaoning, Republic of China
- Party: Chinese Communist Party
- Education: People's Liberation Army Xuanhua Artillery Academy; People's Liberation Army Military Academy; Beijing University of Science and Technology

Military service
- Allegiance: China
- Branch/service: People's Liberation Army Ground Force
- Years of service: 1969–2018
- Rank: General
- Commands: Jinan Military Region

Fan Changlong (Chinese: 范长龙; pinyin: Fàn Chánglóng; born May 1947) is a Chinese retired general in the People's Liberation Army (PLA). He was a Vice Chairman of the Central Military Commission, and formerly served as commander of the Jinan Military Region.

== Biography ==
Fan was born in Dandong, Liaoning. He joined the PLA and the Chinese Communist Party in 1969. He became a major general in 1995, a lieutenant general in 2002, and general on July 15, 2008. Fan has been an alternate of the 16th Central Committee of the Chinese Communist Party, and a full member of the 17th Central Committee. In 2012, ahead of the 18th Party Congress, he was appointed Vice Chairman of the Central Military Commission.

In mid-April 2016, he paid a visit to the disputed Spratly Islands in the South China Sea, according to the country’s Ministry of National Defense, which reported the visit on Friday 15 April 2016. Gen. Fan Changlong was said to have been the highest-ranking People’s Liberation Army officer ever to visit the Spratly Islands. General Fan led a delegation to the “relevant Nansha Islands to offer good wishes to officers and personnel stationed there, and also to understand the construction of facilities on the islands,” said a brief statement from the Ministry of National Defense. His tour appeared intended to show China’s determination to ward off any challenges to its claims over the islands, which are also the subject of claims by the Philippines, Malaysia, Vietnam, Brunei and Taiwan.

Fan Changlong retired from Politburo after the 19th Party Congress in October 2017 and from Central Military Committee in March 2018.

Military offices
Preceded by Ma Fengtong	Commander of the 16th Group Army; 1995–2000	Succeeded by Guan Kai
Preceded by Wang Jianmin	Chief of Staff of the Shenyang Military Region; 2000–2003	Succeeded by Li Shiming
Preceded by Chen Bingde	Commander of the Jinan Military Region; 2004–2012	Succeeded by Zhao Zongqi
Party political offices
Preceded by Xi Jinping/ Guo Boxiong/ Xu Caihou	Vice Chairman of the Central Military Commission of the Chinese Communist Party; 2012–2017	Succeeded by Xu Qiliang/ Zhang Youxia
Government offices
Preceded by Xi Jinping/ Guo Boxiong/ Xu Caihou	Vice Chairman of the Central Military Commission; 2013–2017	Succeeded by Xu Qiliang/ Zhang Youxia
