= Xu Caihou =

People's Liberation Army general (1943–2015)

- 徐才厚
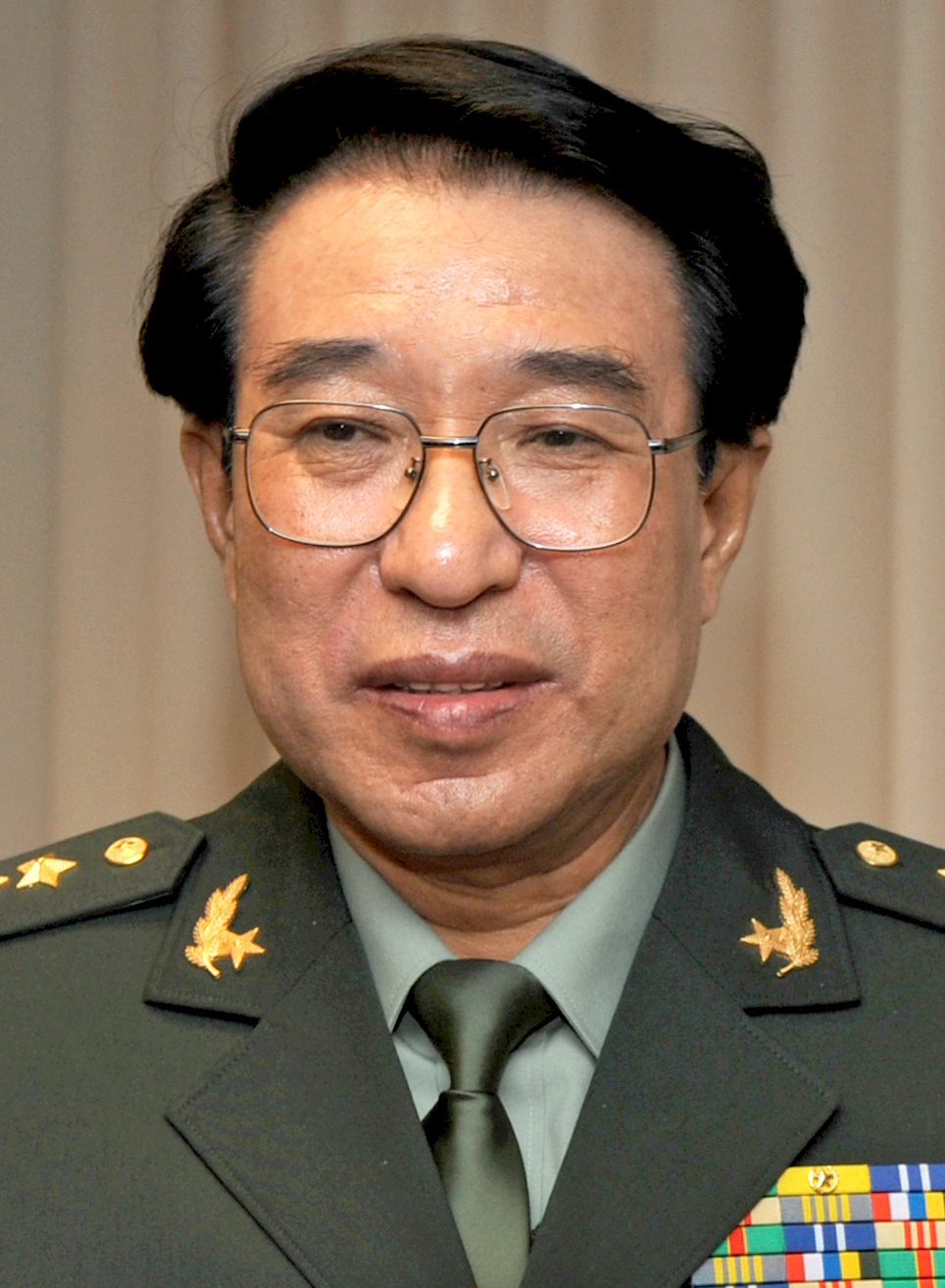
- Xu Caihou in October 2009

Vice Chairman of the Central Military Commission
- In office State Commission; 13 March 2005 – 14 March 2013; Party Commission; 19 September 2004 – 15 November 2012 Serving with Guo Boxiong, Cao Gangchuan and Xi Jinping
- Chairman: Hu Jintao

Head of the General Political Department of the People's Liberation Army
- In office November 2002 – September 2004
- Preceded by: Yu Yongbo
- Succeeded by: Li Jinai

Secretary of the Commission for Discipline Inspection of the Central Military Commission
- In office December 2000 – November 2002
- Preceded by: Zhou Ziyu
- Succeeded by: Zhang Shutian

Personal details
- Born: June 1943 Wafangdian, Fengtian, Manchukuo, Republic of China (now Liaoning, China)
- Died: 15 March 2015 (aged 71) Beijing, People's Republic of China
- Party: Chinese Communist Party (1971–2014, expelled)
- Education: Harbin Military Engineering Institute

Military service
- Allegiance: People's Republic of China
- Branch/service: People's Liberation Army
- Years of service: 1963–1966; 1970–2013
- Rank: General (stripped in 2014)
- Commands: Jinan Military Region (1996–1999)

Chinese name
- Chinese: 徐才厚
Transcriptions
Standard Mandarin
- Hanyu Pinyin: Xú Cáihòu
- Wade–Giles: Hsü Ts'ai-hou
- IPA: [ɕǔ tsʰăɪhôu]

Xu Caihou (Chinese: 徐才厚; June 1943 – 15 March 2015) was a Chinese general in the People's Liberation Army (PLA) and vice chairman of the Central Military Commission (CMC), the country's top military council. As vice chairman of the CMC, he was one of the top ranking officers of the People's Liberation Army. He also held a seat on the 25-member Politburo of the Chinese Communist Party between 2007 and 2012.

Born to a working-class family in Liaoning province, Xu spent much of his earlier career in northeastern China. He moved to Beijing in 1990 to become political commissar of the 16th Group Army, later serving as editor of the PLA's flagship newspaper, the PLA Daily. In 1996 Xu became political commissar of the Jinan Military Region. He became vice chairman of the CMC in September 2004. He retired from office in March 2013.

In March 2014, Xu was detained and put under investigation on suspicion of bribery in one of the highest profile corruption investigations in PLA history. In June 2014, Xu was expelled from the Communist Party. Xu allegedly accumulated massive wealth by routinely demanding large bribes for the promotion of officers under him during his time as vice chairman of the CMC. Xu was undergoing legal proceedings and facing a court martial but charges were dropped after he died of bladder cancer in March 2015.

== Early life and education ==
Xu was born in 1943 to a working-class family in the town of Wafangdian, Liaoning province; his parents were factory workers. He attended No. 8 Middle School in present-day Dalian. He achieved high scores on his Gaokao exams and was admitted to the elite Harbin Military Engineering Institute in Harbin, where he studied electrical engineering. The institute was a feeder school for the army, and produced many graduates who later went on to become high-ranking officers in the PLA. In April 1966, just prior to the beginning of the Cultural Revolution, Xu Caihou, along with all the students attending the institute, were mandated by the government to leave the military to take on civilian jobs.

Xu graduated in 1968, in the midst of the Cultural Revolution, and was sent to the countryside to perform manual agricultural labour for over a year on a military-run farm in Tangyuan County in China's northeastern hinterlands. Subsequently, due to his being of proletarian class background (his parents were factory workers), he was allowed the 'privilege' of re-joining the army. Xu enlisted in the spring of 1970 as an officer cadet and was stationed in Jilin province. After joining the officer corps, it took him four years to earn his first promotion.

== Career ==
After the Cultural Revolution, the Chinese leader Deng Xiaoping was eager to promote young university graduates as part of his military-reform program. Most of the commanding officers of the PLA at the time had only informal or middle school-level education. Beginning in 1982, Xu earned a series of quick promotions. Xu served in Jilin province for much of his early career, generally in roles that facilitated military-political relations.

Xu became the political commissar of the 16th Group Army in 1990 and was promoted to major general shortly thereafter. In an incident upon moving to Beijing for work, Xu was offered an air conditioner to cope with the city's summer heat, as a gift from a classmate in university. He reportedly refused the offer, on the grounds that he did not want to have a privilege that his superior officer, who was managing without an air conditioner, lacked.

Next, Xu served as the chief editor of the People's Liberation Army Daily newspaper; he stayed on the role for just over a year, being promoted again to lieutenant general in the process. In 1996, he became the political commissar of the Jinan Military Region, with a vast area of jurisdiction over military units in several eastern Chinese provinces. Xu's mission in facilitating "political affairs" in the military meant that, in practice, he was in charge of the promotion and performance evaluation of army officers.

=== Central Military Commission ===
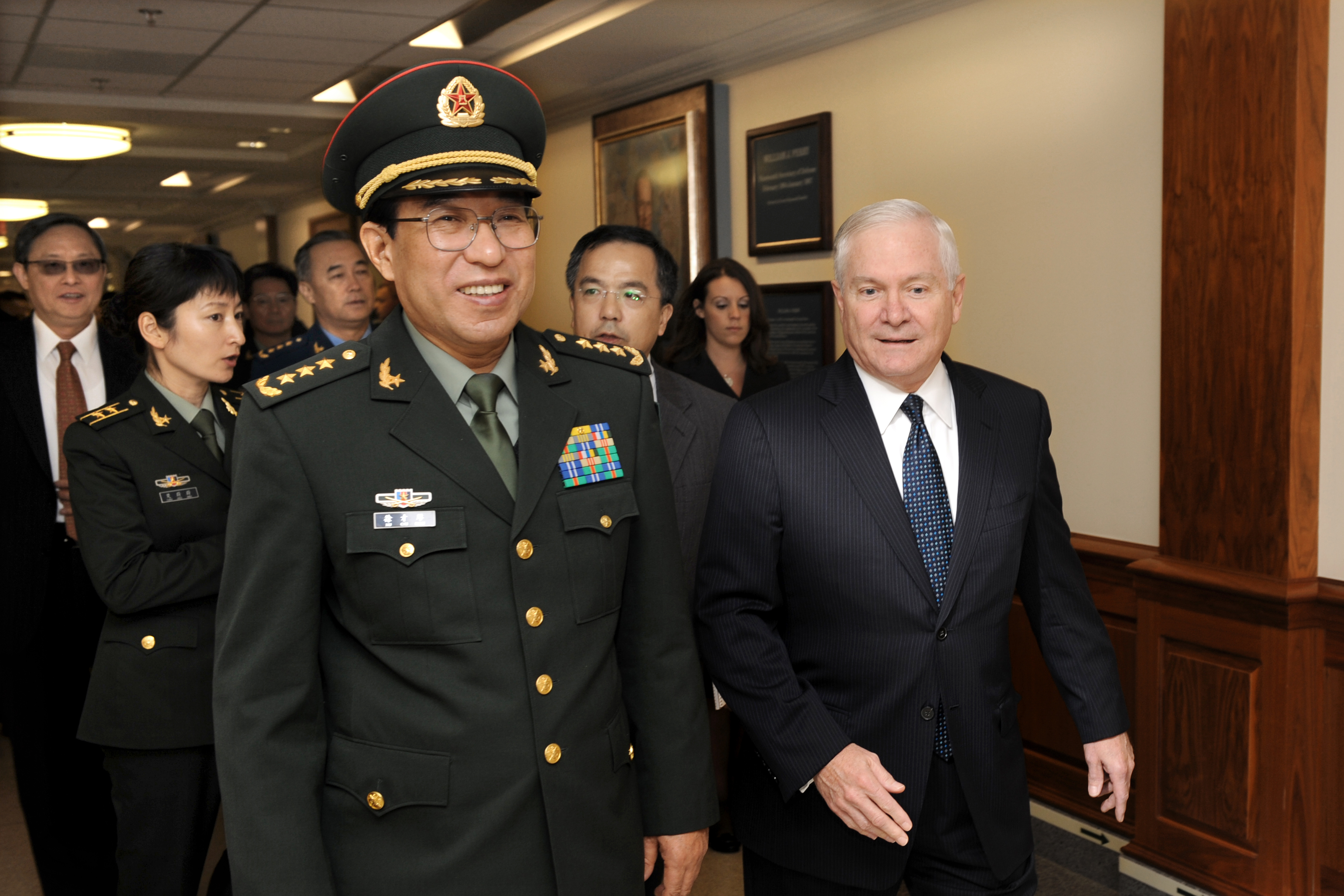
Xu Caihou met U.S. Defense Secretary Robert Gates in 2009.

In 1999, Xu was promoted to the rank of General (Shang Jiang), the highest non-wartime rank in the PLA, and also joined the Central Military Commission, in addition to taking charge of the General Political Department (GPD) as its executive deputy head. In December 2000 he was named the head of the Commission for Discipline Inspection of the Central Military Commission, the military's anti-graft and disciplinary enforcement body. Xu's ascendancy in the military also resulted in his rise in the Communist Party's political hierarchy. In November 2002, he assumed full leadership over the GPD. At the party's 16th National Congress in 2002, Xu became a member of the Secretariat of the Chinese Communist Party, a body in charge of the implementation of party policy.

Xu's rapid promotions at around the turn of the century were attributed to the support given to him by then-Central Military Commission Chairman Jiang Zemin. Observers believe that through Xu, Jiang continued to influence affairs in the military despite his official retirement in 2004; some retired officers simply described Xu and his partner of equal rank Guo Boxiong as "Jiang's proxy in the military."

During his term as Central Military Commission vice chairman, beginning in September 2004, Xu wielded significant authority over personnel decisions in the upper echelons of the military. Xu was seen by some observers as the day-to-day executive authority in the upper military ranks because CCP General Secretary and Central Military Chairman Hu Jintao, nominally Xu's superior, took a relatively hands-off approach to military affairs. In 2007, he was named to the 25-member Politburo, being elected at the 1st Plenary Session of the 17th Central Committee. Xu retired from the Politburo in 2012 and the Central Military Commission in 2013.

== Corruption allegations ==
"I used to work for Xu Caihou ... his method of doing things and choosing his people [for promotions] was, first, see how much money is involved, second, his personal affinity to them, and third, to rely on emotions and feelings. This was the worst part about his influence."

— Mj. General Yang Chunchang (March 2015)

Along with Guo Boxiong, Xu sought to minimize Hu's authority on the CMC by concealing information, selectively reporting important information, and consolidating their influence over the personnel appointment process. Xu and Guo also sought to marginalize Xi Jinping, Hu's apparent successor.

According to numerous reports in Chinese and international media, the practice of exchanging "cash for ranks" was widespread during Xu's term as vice chairman; the practice was ostensibly common from the highest-ranking officers to the rank-and-file petty officers. According to sources in the army, Xu's power during his CMC Vice Chairmanship was largely unchecked, they cited an example where one officer attempted to bribe Xu with ten million yuan to secure a higher rank, another officer 'outbid' the first one with twenty million yuan (~$3.2 million), so Xu annulled the arrangement with the first officer. Other accusations suggested that during Xu's term in office, an implicit set of prices were attached to each rank in the army as well as other 'privileges' such as party membership.

It was reported in March 2014 that Xu, then aged 70, had been diagnosed with bladder cancer and was undergoing extensive treatment at the 301 Military Hospital in Beijing. A corruption probe was opened at around the same time. There was speculation among some in the military that Xu would be 'spared' charges due to his ill-health. Gu Junshan, one of Xu's allegedly favorite officers, who was promoted during Xu's years in office, had already been under investigation for a wide-reaching corruption scandal involving the military's real estate assets.

Xu's supporters, pleading for clemency, said that having terminal cancer was akin to having already received the "death penalty," citing the precedent of former Vice Premier Huang Ju as a case where corruption charges should not be pressed against an official in ill-health. The decision to investigate Xu was reportedly made on 15 March 2014, when Xu was taken from his hospital bed by armed policemen. His wife, daughter and former secretary were also reportedly taken into custody.

At a Chinese New Year gala for retired military officials in 2014, Xu reportedly tried to speak to Xi Jinping, who is the Chairman of the Central Military Commission, several times, without success.

=== Expulsion from the party ===
Xu was expelled from the Chinese Communist Party on 30 June 2014. State media described Xu's crimes as abuse of power, accepting bribes directly or via family members in exchange for promotions, and advancing the interests of those close to him through the powers vested in his office.

Xu's downfall was unexpected because corruption investigations involving mid-tier military officers are rarely publicly announced in the People's Republic of China as to not compromise national security. Such an announcement involving a high-ranking general was entirely unprecedented. Xu became the highest-ranked officer in the history of the People's Liberation Army to be investigated in corruption. During the investigation into Xu, investigators found over one tonne of cash in his Beijing home, along with precious gems, ancient artifacts, and artwork. It was said that much of the cash was still stowed away neatly in boxes marked with the names of individual officers, and that it took 12 trucks to transport all the materials confiscated from his home.

Some analysts believe that Xu's downfall signaled a consolidation of military power directly under the hands of Xi Jinping and is of greater political significance than the corruption investigation surrounding Zhou Yongkang, a former member of the Politburo Standing Committee. His downfall had been presented by the Communist Party as part of a wider campaign by Xi Jinping to eradicate corruption and reform the military. In October 2014, Xu was reported to have confessed to taking bribes, becoming the highest-profile figure in China's military to be caught up in Xi Jinping's anti-corruption campaign.

== Death ==
Xu died on 15 March 2015, from bladder cancer and multiple organ failure at the 301 Military Hospital in Beijing at the age of 71, likely during the annual "two sessions" (Lianghui) meeting of China's legislature and legislative advisory body. There is some speculation that his death was not announced until the conclusion of Lianghui on 15 March to avoid distracting from the proceedings of the nation's pre-eminent annual political gathering. As a result of his death, military prosecutors announced that, "in accordance with legal procedures," they will not continue to pursue charges against him, despite having already filed suit in military court, but will continue work in investigating his "ill-gotten gains".

Military offices
Preceded by Fang Zuqi	Political commissar of the 16th Group Army; 1990–1992	Succeeded by Sun Dafa
Preceded by Zhu Tingxun	President of the People's Liberation Army Daily; 1993–1994	Succeeded by Sun Zhongtong
Preceded by Du Tiehuan	Political commissar of Jinan Military Region; 1996–1999	Succeeded by Zhang Wentai
Preceded by Yu Yongbo	Head of General Political Department; 2002–2004	Succeeded by Li Jinai
Party political offices
Preceded by Zhou Ziyu	Secretary of the Commission for Discipline Inspection of the Central Military Commission; 2000–2002	Succeeded by Zhang Shutian
Preceded by Guo Boxiong/ Cao Gangchuan/ Hu Jintao	Vice Chairman of the Central Military Commission of the Chinese Communist Party; 2004–2012	Succeeded by Fan Changlong/ Xu Qiliang
Government offices
Preceded by Guo Boxiong/ Cao Gangchuan	Vice Chairman of the Central Military Commission; 2005–2013	Succeeded by Fan Changlong/ Xu Qiliang
