= Commission for Science, Technology and Industry for National Defense =

Chinese government body (1982–2008)

The Commission for Science, Technology and Industry for National Defense (COSTIND; 国防科学技术工业委员会) was a civilian commission within the State Council of the People's Republic of China, responsible for setting policy for defense procurement. It was considered as the Chinese counterpart of DARPA of the US. The ministry was formed in 1982 to centralize Chinese defense procurement and technology whose responsibility had been distributed among several agencies. In March 2008, COSTIND was merged into a new ministry called the Ministry of Industry and Information Technology (MIIT) and renamed as the State Administration for Science, Technology and Industry for National Defense (SASTIND). The final-term COSTIND deputy director, Chen Qiufa, was named as the head of SASTIND.

== History ==
In August 1982, COSTIND was formed by merging the National Defense Science and Technology Commission (NDSTC), the National Defense Industries Office (which was in the State Council's purview), and the Office of the Science, Technology, and Armaments Commission (which was in the purview of the Central Military Commission). COSTIND oversaw defense R&D, production, and procurement. It included both military and civilian personnel.

In 1998, the government split COSTIND into the General Armament Department of the People's Liberation Army and the "new" COSTIND, reporting directly to the State Council. Also in 1998, COSTIND began the "national defense science and technology innovation project."

COSTIND played an important role in the space program of China as one of its subagencies the China National Space Administration is responsible for Chinese space policy. COSTIND administered the China Engineering and Technology Information Network (CETIN), which has been described as a "one-stop shop for foreign military technology information."

The China Atomic Energy Authority was part of COSTIND.

In March 2008, COSTIND was renamed the State Administration of Science, Technology and Industry for National Defense (SASTIND).

== Universities administered by COSTIND ==
- Beijing Institute of Technology
- Beijing University of Aeronautics and Astronautics
- Harbin Engineering University
- Harbin Institute of Technology
- Northwestern Polytechnical University
- Nanjing Aeronautics and Astronautics University
- Nanjing University of Science and Technology

== Enterprises administered by COSTIND ==
- China Aviation Industry Corporation I
- China Aviation Industry Corporation II
- China North Industries Group Corporation
- China South Industries Group Corporation
- China Shipbuilding Industry Corporation
- China State Shipbuilding Corporation
- China Aerospace Science and Technology Corporation
- China Aerospace Machinery and Electronics Corporation
- China National Nuclear Corporation
- China Nuclear Engineering & Construction Group

== List of chairmen ==
1. Chen Bin (陈彬)
2. Ding Henggao (丁衡高)
3. Cao Gangchuan: 1996–1998
4. Liu Jibin (刘积斌): 1998–2003
5. Zhang Yunchuan: 2003–2007
6. Zhang Qingwei: 2007–2008

== List of political commissar ==
1. Xing Yongning (邢永宁)
2. Dai Xuejiang (戴学江)
3. Li Jinai (李继耐): 1996–1998

== See also ==
- Defence Research and Development Organisation (DRDO), Indian counterpart
