= Wang Hongyao =

Chinese general

General Wang Hongyao
- 王洪尧

Political Commissar of the PLA General Armaments Department (CMC Equipment Development Department)
- In office July 2011 – January 2017
- Preceded by: Chi Wanchun
- Succeeded by: An Zhaoqing

Personal details
- Born: November 1951 (age 74) Jining, Shandong, China
- Party: Chinese Communist Party
- Education: PLA National Defence University

Military service
- Allegiance: People's Republic of China
- Branch/service: People's Liberation Army Ground Force
- Years of service: 1969–2017
- Rank: General

Wang Hongyao (Chinese: 王洪尧; pinyin: Wáng Hóngyáo; born November 1951) is a retired general of the Chinese People's Liberation Army (PLA). He served as Political Commissar of the PLA General Armaments Department, and its successor organization, the Equipment Development Department of the Central Military Commission, from 2011 to 2017.

== Biography ==
Wang Hongyao was born in November 1951 in Jining, Shandong Province. He holds a graduate degree from the PLA National Defence University.

Wang joined the PLA in December 1969, and served in the 199th division of the 67th Group Army. From 1993 to 1996 he worked in the political department of the 199th division. In 1996 he became the Political Commissar of the 162nd division of the 54th Group Army. From 2000 he served as Director of the Political Department, and then Political Commissar of the 54th Army. He became Director of the Political Department of the Shenyang Military Region in 2007, and Deputy Political Commissar in 2010. In 2011 he was appointed Political Commissar of the PLA General Armaments Department.

Wang Hongyao attained the rank of major general in July 2002 and lieutenant general in July 2009. On 31 July 2013, he was promoted to general (shangjiang), the highest rank for Chinese military officers in active service.

Wang was a member of the 18th Central Committee of the Chinese Communist Party (2012–2017).

Military offices
Preceded by Qi Zhengxiang	Political Commissar of the 54th Group Army; 2003–2008	Succeeded by Gao Jianguo
Preceded by Zhang Tiejian	Director of the Political Department of the Shenyang Military Region; 2007–2010	Succeeded by Gao Jianguo
Preceded by Zhang Tiejian	Deputy Political Commissar of the Shenyang Military Region; 2010–2011	Succeeded by Hou Hehua
Preceded by Chi Wanchun	Political Commissar of the People's Liberation Army General Armaments Department; 2011–2016	Succeeded by Position revoked
New title	Political Commissar of the Equipment Development Department of the Central Military Commission; 2016–2017	Succeeded by An Zhaoqing
