= State Administration of Science, Technology and Industry for National Defense =

Main defense technology agency of China

- 国家国防科技工业局

Agency overview
- Formed: March 2008; 18 years ago
- Preceding agency: Commission for Science, Technology and Industry for National Defense
- Jurisdiction: Government of China
- Headquarters: 8 Fucheng Road, Haidian, Beijing, China
- Agency executive: Xu Dazhe, Director
- Parent agency: Ministry of Industry and Information Technology
- Child agencies: China Atomic Energy Authority; China National Space Administration
- Website: www.sastind.gov.cn

The State Administration of Science, Technology and Industry for National Defense (SASTIND) is a civilian agency under the Chinese Ministry of Industry and Information Technology that is tasked with formulating policies, laws, and regulations regarding science, technology, and industry related to national defense. Established in 2008, its responsibilities extend to the coordination and promotion of the development of defense technology, overseeing China's space activities, and handling any international cooperation in these domains.

== Function ==
SASTIND manages nuclear materials in both the civilian and military sectors. It is the principal authority for civilian nuclear cycle facilities (except nuclear power plants, which are in the purview of the National Energy Administration).

SASTIND manages all nuclear defense facilities other than nuclear weapons and naval nuclear materials sites. These include HEU, plutonium, and tritium production facilities and sites that manages waste from those facilities.

== History ==
The SASTIND was established in March 2008, superseding the Commission for Science, Technology and Industry for National Defense (COSTIND).

In July 2018, the State Administration for Science, Technology and Industry for National Defence signed an agreement with the Government of Kuwait to increase cooperation in the defense industry.

== Leadership ==
=== Directors ===
Name	Chinese name	Took office	Left office	Ref.
Chen Qiufa	陈求发	March 2008	January 2013	
Ma Xingrui	马兴瑞	March 2013	December 2013	
Xu Dazhe	许达哲	December 2013	August 2016	
Tang Dengjie	唐登杰	May 2017	January 2018	
Zhang Kejian	张克俭	May 2018	Incumbent	
