= Guo Zhenggang =

Chinese admiral

- 郭正钢

Personal details
- Born: January 1970 (age 56) Liquan County, Shaanxi, China
- Party: Chinese Communist Party
- Spouse: Wu Fangfang
- Parent: Guo Boxiong (father)

Military service
- Allegiance: People's Republic of China
- Branch/service: People's Liberation Army Ground Force
- Rank: Major general

Guo Zhenggang (simplified Chinese: 郭正钢; traditional Chinese: 郭正鋼; pinyin: Guō Zhènggāng; born January 1970) is a former major general of the People's Liberation Army. He was detained by Chinese military authorities in February 2015, suspected of corruption.

== Life and career ==
Guo was born in Liquan County, Shaanxi, in January 1970, the son of Guo Boxiong, former Vice Chairman of the Central Military Commission. He joined the military in March 1989. In 2013, Guo became the Director of Political Department of Zhejiang Military District. Guo attained the rank of Major General (shao jiang) on January 14, 2015. He was promoted to Deputy Political Commissar of Zhejiang Military District. On February 10, 2015, Guo was detained for investigation by military prosecution authorities.

Guo married Wu Fangfang (吴芳芳; born c. 1969), in the latter half of 2012. She was also detained by the authorities in early 2015.

Military offices
Preceded by Ma Jiali	Director of Political Department of Zhejiang Military District; 2012–2015	Succeeded by Shan Xiuhua
Preceded by Lan Rongchong	Political Commissar of Zhoushan Garrison Command; 2011–2012	Succeeded by Feng Fuying
