= Dalian No.8 Senior High School =

Coordinates: 38.9161°N 121.5900°E

Dalian No. 8 Senior High School
- 大连市第八中学

Location
- #12 Yongming Lane, Fushun St., Shahekou District, Dalian

Information
- Motto: 惜时 坚韧 创新
- Established: 1952
- School district: Dalian, Liaoning, P.R.C.
- Dean: Liang Lidong, Zhang E, Xu Hui
- Principal: Ding Yancai
- Language: Chinese (Mandarin)
- Color: Blue
- Athletics conference: Football team of DL#8 High
- Affiliation: Public
- Website: www.dl8z.com

Dalian No. 8 Senior High School (Chinese:大连市第八中学) is a public high school in Dalian, Liaoning province, China. Established in 1952, it was among the first high schools that received the title of demonstrative and province-level prominent school in Liaoning province. Its 60th anniversary was held in 2012. The school is located to the east of Xi'an road, Dalian. Dalian No.8 Senior High School was entitled as the first well-established school in Liaoning in 1981, and gained the ability of waiving the university entrance exam for its school-recommended students. The school also enjoys the membership of Union of National Prominent Schools (UNPS) and Research-Oriented-UNPS.

== Motto ==
惜时 坚韧 创新 (Value time, Be persistent, Be creative)

== Infrastructure and Facilities ==
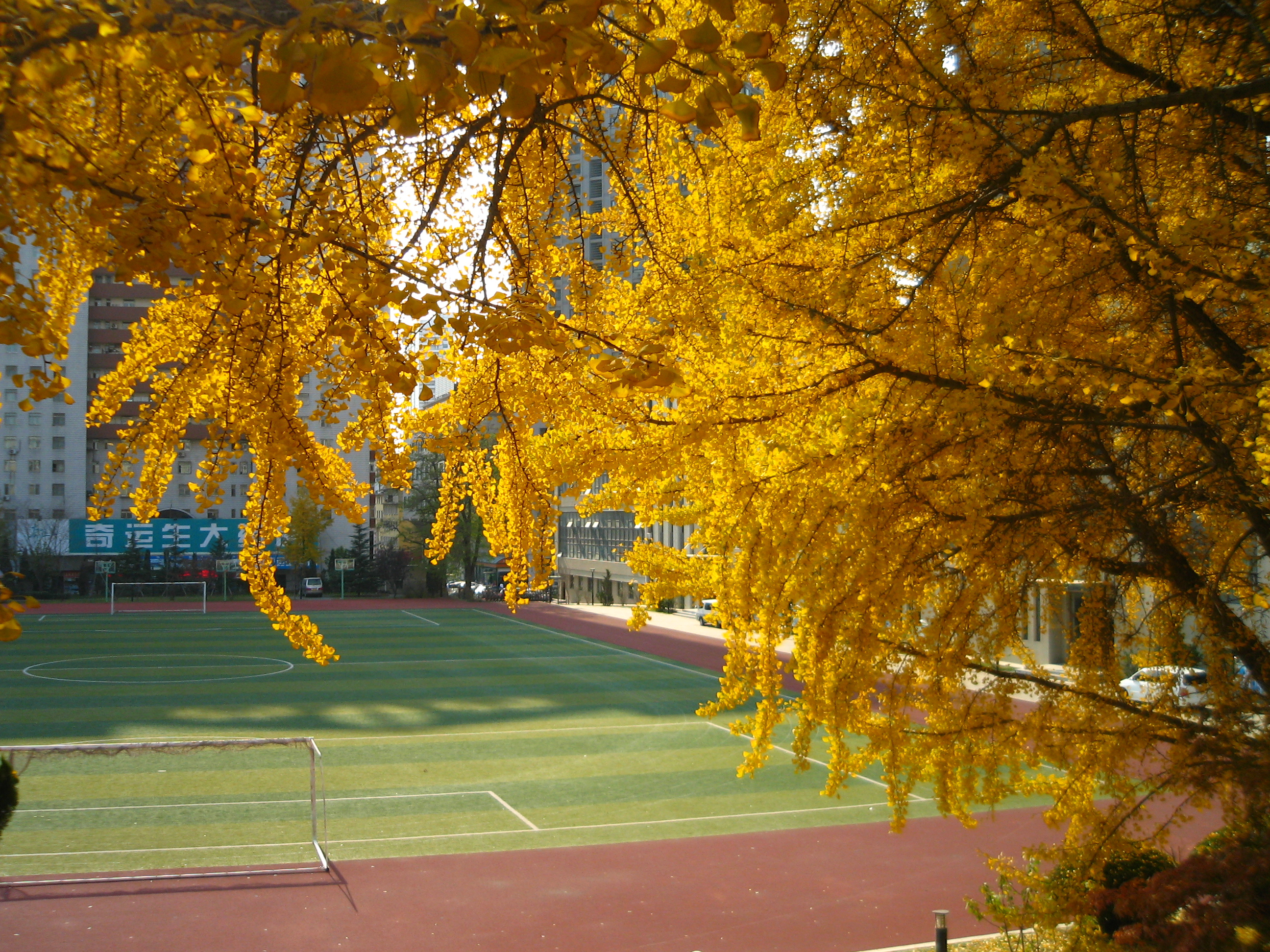
Sight from classroom A210 to the play ground. (photographed in fall)

The school overhauled and rebuilt its buildings in the year of 2002, joined by a number of new dedicated laboratories. Of all the books in its library, about 80,000 are available to students. The school also provides gym, man-made football and basketball field.

In the summer of 2008, the Dalian city government decided to refurbish the main building of the school.

=== Activities ===
Dalian No.8 Senior High has won the first place for 4 consequent years in the RoboCup Junior competition. Dalian No.8 Senior High won the first place of 2016 RoboCup Junior competition.

== Notable alumni ==
- Xu Caihou, Vice Chairman of the Central Military Commission.
