= Dai Xuejiang =

Chinese Army general

- 戴学江

Political Commissar of the Commission for Science, Technology and Industry for National Defense
- In office November 1992 – July 1995
- Preceded by: Xing Yongning
- Succeeded by: Li Jinai

Personal details
- Born: February 1930 (age 96) Jingjiang, Jiangsu, China
- Party: Chinese Communist Party
- Spouse: Xie Dejing
- Relations: Xie Wuliang, Chen Yi

Military service
- Allegiance: People's Republic of China
- Branch/service: People's Liberation Army Ground Force
- Years of service: 1946–1998
- Rank: General
- Battles/wars: Chinese Civil War; Korean War

Chinese name
- Simplified Chinese: 戴学江
- Traditional Chinese: 戴學江
Transcriptions
Standard Mandarin
- Hanyu Pinyin: Dài Xuéjiāng

Dai Xuejiang (Chinese: 戴学江; born February 1930) is a general in the People's Liberation Army of China who served as political commissar of the Commission for Science, Technology and Industry for National Defense from 1992 to 1995. He was a delegate to the 8th National People's Congress. He was also a member of the Standing Committee of the 8th and 9th Chinese People's Political Consultative Conference.

== Biography ==
Dai Xuejiang was born in Jingjiang, Jiangsu, in February 1930. In 1943, he joined the local Chinese Communist Youth League to oppose the Japanese occupation. In September 1946, he enlisted in the People's Liberation Army (PLA), and joined the Chinese Communist Party (CCP) in May 1947. During the Chinese Civil War, he served as a platoon political commissar in the 华东野战军 (later Third Field Army) and participated in the Menglianggu campaign, Huaihai campaign, Yangtze River Crossing campaign, and Shanghai campaign.

After the establishment of the Communist State, in 1952, he fought as a company and later battalion political commissar in the Korean War, as part of the 67th Division, 23rd Army under Zhong Guochu. After the war, he served at various capacities in the 23rd Army and Shenyang Military Region. Between 1978 and 1980, he was designated as the frontline commander of the 23rd Army against possible Soviet aggression in Heihe due to the Sino-Vietnamese War. In 1985, he was assigned to the Shenyang Military Region, eventually becoming the Director of the Political Department in August 1988 and Deputy Political Commissar in April 1990. In 1992, he was appointed Political Commissar of the Commission for Science, Technology and Industry for National Defense, serving in the post until his early retirement in 1995, whereby he handed the position to his protégé Li Jinai.

He was promoted to the rank of major general (shaojiang) in 1988, lieutenant general (zhongjiang) in 1990, and general (shangjiang) in 1994.

== Personal life ==
Dai Xuejiang married Xie Dejing, granddaughter of Xie Wuliang and niece of Chen Yi.

Military offices
Preceded by Xing Yongning	Political Commissar of the Commission for Science, Technology and Industry for National Defense; 1992–1995	Succeeded by Li Jinai
