= Ding Henggao =

- 丁衡高

Chairperson of the Commission for Science, Technology and Industry for National Defense
- In office March 1985 – November 1996
- Premier: Zhao Ziyang; Li Peng
- Preceded by: Chen Bin
- Succeeded by: Cao Gangchuan

Personal details
- Born: 3 February 1931 (age 95) Nanjing, Jiangsu, China
- Party: Chinese Communist Party
- Spouse: Nie Li
- Relations: Nie Rongzhen (father-in-law)
- Education: Nanjing University; Leningrad Institute of Fine Mechanics and Optics

Military service
- Allegiance: People's Republic of China
- Branch/service: People's Liberation Army Ground Force
- Rank: General

Ding Henggao (Chinese: 丁衡高; pinyin: Dīng Hénggāo; born 3 February 1931) is a general in the People's Liberation Army of China who served as chairperson of the Commission for Science, Technology and Industry for National Defense from 1985 to 1995.

He was a member of the 8th and 9th National Committee of the Chinese People's Political Consultative Conference. He was an alternate member of the 12th Central Committee of the Chinese Communist Party and a member of the 13th and 14th Central Committee of the Chinese Communist Party.

== Biography ==
Ding was born in Nanjing, Jiangsu, on 3 February 1931. In 1948, he entered National Central University (now Nanjing University), where he majored in the Department of Mechanics. After University, he worked at the Precision Machinery Research Office of the Instrument Department of the Chinese Academy of Sciences. In 1957, he was sent to study at the Leningrad Institute of Fine Mechanics and Optics, where he earned his vice-doctorate degree in 1961.

Ding returned to China in October 1961 and that same year was assigned to the Design Office of the Fifth Research Institute of the Ministry of National Defense (now China Aerospace Science and Technology Corporation) and was transferred to the Seventh Design Institute of the Ministry of Machinery Industry in September 1964. He was despatched to the Commission for Science, Technology and Industry for National Defense in September 1977. He moved up the ranks to become chairperson in March 1985.

He was promoted to the rank of lieutenant general (zhongjiang) in September 1988 and general (shangjiang) in June 1994.

== Personal life ==
He married Nie Li, daughter of Nie Rongzhen.

== Honours and awards ==
- 1985 State Science and Technology Progress Award (Special Prize)
- 1994 Member of the Chinese Academy of Engineering (CAE)
- 1999 Science and Technology Achievement Award of the Ho Leung Ho Lee Foundation

Government offices
Preceded by Chen Bin	Chairperson of the Commission for Science, Technology and Industry for National Defense; 1985–1996	Succeeded by Cao Gangchuan
