= Zhang Wannian =

Chinese general

- 张万年
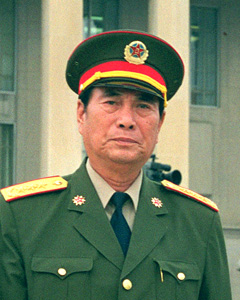

Vice Chairman of the Central Military Commission
- In office Party Commission: 28 September 1995 – 15 November 2002; State Commission: December 1995 – 5 March 2003 Serving with Liu Huaqing, Zhang Zhen, Chi Haotian and Hu Jintao
- Chairman: Jiang Zemin

Personal details
- Born: 1 August 1928 Longkou, Shandong, China
- Died: 14 January 2015 (aged 86) Beijing, China
- Party: Chinese Communist Party
- Spouse: Zhong Peizhao

Military service
- Allegiance: People's Republic of China
- Branch/service: People's Liberation Army Ground Force
- Years of service: 1944–2003
- Rank: General
- Battles/wars: Sino-Vietnamese border war Chinese Civil War; Korean War
- Awards: Order of Liberation (3rd Class; 1955)

Chinese name
- Traditional Chinese: 張萬年
- Simplified Chinese: 张万年
Transcriptions
Standard Mandarin
- Hanyu Pinyin: Zhāng Wànnián
- Wade–Giles: Chang Wan-nien

Zhang Wannian (Chinese: 张万年; 1 August 1928 – 14 January 2015) was a general of the People's Liberation Army (PLA) of the People's Republic of China.

== Biography ==
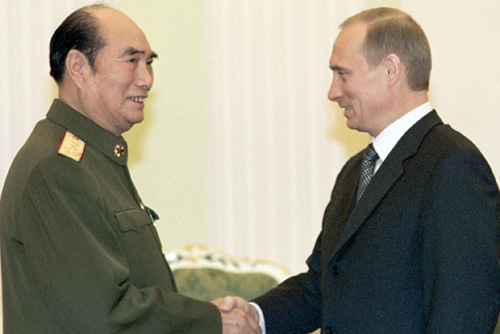
Zhang Wannian with Russian President Putin, 21 February 2001

Zhang Wannian was born in Huang County (now Longkou), Shandong Province of China, on 1 August 1928.

He joined the Eighth Route Army in August 1944 and the Chinese Communist Party (CCP) in August 1945.

From 1958 to 1961, he studied in the preparatory and basic department at the Nanjing Military Academy of the PLA. From 1962 to 1966, he was the head of the 367th regiment, affiliated to the 123rd division of 41st Army. From 1966 to 1968, he was the vice director in the battle department in the headquarters of the Guangzhou Military Region. From 1968 to 1978, he was the head of the 127th division of the 43rd Army. From 1978 to 1981, he was the vice head of the 43rd Army and head of the 127th Division. He studied at PLA Military Academy from 1978 to 1979. He led the 127th Division of the 43rd Corps during the 1979 Sino-Vietnamese border war. It was reported that due to combat success of the 127th Division in inflicting massive casualties on Vietnamese forces during the war, Vietnam sought to capture Zhang alive. From 1981 to 1982, he was the head of 43rd Corps. From 1982 to 1985, he was the vice commander in Wuhan Military Region.

From 1985 to 1987, he was the vice commander of Guangzhou Military Region, and became the commander and vice secretary of CCP's committee there in 1987 till 1990. From 1990 to 1992, he was the commander of Jinan Military Region, and vice secretary of CCP committee there.

In 1992, he became a member of CCP's Central Military Commission (CMC) and the director as well as the secretary of the party of the General Staff Department of PLA. In September 1995, he was elevated to vice-Chairman of the CMC, along with Chi Haotian. As expected, both were elected as the executive vice Chairmen of the CMC at the 15th National Congress of the Chinese Communist Party. He was soon promoted to the Politburo as well as the CCP Secretariat. He attended the handover ceremony in Hong Kong in 1997 as the sole senior military representative (Vice-Chairman of the Central Military Commission), indicating his preeminent position in the military.

He was a deputy to CCP's 9th National Congress, and an alternative member of 12th and 13th Central Committee of the Chinese Communist Party. He became a member of the 14th and 15th CCP Central Committees, and a Politburo member and Secretary of the Secretariat in 15th Central Committee.

He was awarded Third-Class Liberation Medal, and has achieved Great Honors five times. When he visited Pakistan in September 1993, he was awarded a military medal by the President.

He was promoted to lieutenant general in September 1988, and to general in June 1993. He retired in 2003.

He was married to Zhong Peizhao (钟佩昭).

== Analysis ==
Zhang viewed the PLA exercises during the 1995-1996 Taiwan Strait crisis as successful. According to Zhang, "First, they showed the strong resolve of the PLA in protecting national unity; second, they served as a warning to the outside intervening powers; third, they also provided encouragement for the people on Taiwan who supported peaceful reunification of the island."

Military offices
Preceded by You Taizhong	Commander of the Guangzhou Military Region; 1987–1990	Succeeded by Zhu Dunfa
Preceded by Li Jiulong	Commander of the Jinan Military Region; 1990–1992	Succeeded by Zhang Taiheng
Preceded by Chi Haotian	Head of PLA General Staff Department; 1992–1995	Succeeded by Fu Quanyou
