= Central Research Institute of Culture and History =

Chinese research institute

- Other name: 中央文史研究馆
- Parent institution: State Council of the People's Republic of China
- Established: 1951
- Focus: Research Institute
- Location: Beijing
- Website: www.counsellor.gov.cn

Central Research Institute of Culture and History (Chinese: 中央文史研究馆) is a think tank founded by the Chinese Communist Party and the Chinese government. The Premier of the State Council appoints its presidents, vice presidents, and fellows.

== History ==
The founding of the Central Research Institute of Culture and History was supported by Mao Zedong. On the eve of the liberation of Beijing, Mao Zedong told his mentor, Fu Dingyi, in Shijiazhuang that the CCP would have an arrangement for senior indigent scholars and would create an institute for them. On December 2, 1949, in a letter to Liu Yazi, Mao mentioned again that "the issue of institute of culture and history has been assigned to premier Zhou Enlai, and will be soon settled". Later, Mao and Zhou asked Fu Dingyi, Liu Yazi, Zhang Shizhao among others to join the planning work, and also appointed Lin Boqu and Qi Yanming to be in charge of the founding project. On July 29, 1951, the vice premier of the State Council, Dong Biwu, announced the "founding of Research Institute of Cultural and History of the State Council". Fu Dingyi became the first president, and Ye Gongchuo, Liu Yazi and Zhang Shizhao were the vice presidents. After the death of Fu Dingyi in 1958, Zhang Shizhao became the second president, and more elite scholars, Xu Senyu, Chen Yinke, Shen Yinmo, Xing Zanting, Xie Wuliang and Shang Yanliu were vice presidents. In 1974, Yang Dongchun was the third president. Ye Shengtao succeeded Yang as the fourth president in 1980. Xiao Qian was the fifth president since 1989. And the sixth president was Qigong starting from 1999. Since 1986, Xiao Qian, Wu Kong, Qigong, Wang Chuguang and Yuan Xingpei have served as vice president. The current president is Yuan Xingpei. There are currently 29 fellows in the institute, with an average age of 79.2.
