= Vice Chairman of the Central Military Commission =

Vice Chairman of the Central Military Commission of the Communist Party of China Vice Chairman of the Central Military Commission of the People's Republic of China
- 中国共产党中央军事委员会副主席 中华人民共和国中央军事委员会副主席
- Emblems of the Chinese Communist Party and the People's Republic of China

- Flags of the Chinese Communist Party and the People's Republic of China
- Incumbent; Zhang Shengmin
- Central Military Commission
- Status: Deputy national-level official
- Reports to: Chairman
- Seat: "August 1st Building", Beijing
- Nominator: Party Central Committee (party commission); Chairman of the Central Military Commission (state commission)
- Appointer: Party Central Committee (party commission); National People's Congress (state commission)
- Term length: Five years, renewable
- Formation: December 1925; 100 years ago (party commission); October 1949; 76 years ago (state commission)

The Vice Chairmen of the Central Military Commission are deputies to the chairman of the Central Military Commission, who is the commander-in-chief of the People's Liberation Army (PLA), the People's Armed Police (PAP) and the Militia.

There are technically two offices with the same name, including the vice chairman of the Chinese Communist Party (CCP) CMC and vice chairman of the People's Republic of China (PRC) CMC. However, under the arrangement of "one institution with two names", they function as one office. According to military regulations, the vice chairmen are granted the rank of general by the virtue of their posts. Since 1997, the vice chairmen have served as the only members of the CCP Politburo holding military rank.

According to the state constitution, the vice state CMC vice chairmen are elected by the National People's Congress after the nomination of the CMC chairman. According to the CCP constitution, the Party CMC vice chairmen are officially elected by the CCP's Central Committee. Currently, Zhang Shengmin is currently serving as the vice chairman.

== Party commissions ==
=== CCP Central [Revolutionary] Military Commission (1937–49) ===
Vice-chairmen of the Central Revolutionary Military Commission (August 1937 – August 1945) → Central Military Commission of the Chinese Communist Party (August 1945 – September 1949), a.k.a. the Chinese People's Revolutionary Military Commission (November 1948 – September 1949)
Military rank	Name (birth–death)	Hanzi	Took office	Left office	Tenure	Term(s)	Portrait
General (Republic of China, awarded 1937) (later Marshal of the People's Republic of China, awarded 1955)	Zhu De (1886–1976)	朱德	22 August 1937	30 September 1949	12 years, 39 days	6th, 7th	
Lieutenant General (Republic of China, awarded 1937)	Zhou Enlai (1898–1976)	周恩来	22 August 1937	30 September 1949	12 years, 39 days	6th, 7th	
—	Wang Jiaxiang (1906–1974)	王稼祥	6 November 1938	23 August 1945	6 years, 290 days	6th, 7th	
—	Liu Shaoqi (1898–1969)	刘少奇	20 March 1943	30 September 1949	6 years, 194 days	6th, 7th	
Lieutenant General (Republic of China, awarded 1937) (later Marshal of the People's Republic of China, awarded 1955)	Peng Dehuai (1898–1974)	彭德怀	23 August 1945	30 September 1949	4 years, 38 days	7th	

=== CCP Central Military Commission (1954–present) ===
Vice-chairmen of the Central Military Commission of the Chinese Communist Party (September 1959 – present)
Military rank	Name (birth–death)	Hanzi	Took office	Left office	Tenure	Term(s)	Portrait
Marshal	He Long (1896–1969)	贺龙	26 September 1959	24 April 1969	9 years, 210 days	8th	
Marshal	Lin Biao (1907–1971)	林彪	26 September 1959	13 September 1971	11 years, 352 days	8th, 9th	
Marshal	Nie Rongzhen (1889–1992)	聂荣臻	26 September 1959	1 November 1987	28 years, 36 days	8th, 9th, 10th, 11th, 12th	
Marshal	Chen Yi (1901–1972)	陈毅	8 January 1966	6 January 1972	5 years, 363 days	8th, 9th	
Marshal	Liu Bocheng (1892–1986)	刘伯承	8 January 1966	11 September 1982	16 years, 246 days	8th, 9th, 10th, 11th	
Marshal	Ye Jianying (1897–1986)	叶剑英	8 January 1966	22 October 1986	20 years, 287 days	8th, 9th, 10th, 11th, 12th	
Marshal	Xu Xiangqian (1901–1990)	徐向前	8 January 1966	1 November 1987	21 years, 297 days	8th, 9th, 10th, 11th, 12th	
—	Deng Xiaoping (1904–1997)	邓小平	10 January 1975	7 April 1976	1 year, 88 days	10th	
—	Deng Xiaoping (1904–1997)	邓小平	19 August 1977	28 June 1981	3 years, 313 days	11th	
—	Yang Shangkun (1907–1998)	杨尚昆	11 September 1982	18 October 1992	10 years, 37 days	12th, 13th	
—	Zhao Ziyang (1919–2005)	赵紫阳	1 November 1987	23 June 1989	1 year, 234 days	13th	
Admiral	Liu Huaqing (1916–2011)	刘华清	9 November 1989	18 September 1997	7 years, 313 days	13th, 14th	
General	Zhang Zhen (1914–2015)	张震	18 October 1992	18 September 1997	4 years, 335 days	14th	
General	Zhang Wannian (1928–2015)	张万年	28 September 1995	15 November 2002	7 years, 48 days	14th, 15th	
General	Chi Haotian (born 1929)	迟浩田	28 September 1995	15 November 2002	7 years, 48 days	14th, 15th	
—	Hu Jintao (born 1942)	胡锦涛	22 September 1999	19 September 2004	4 years, 363 days	15th, 16th	
General	Cao Gangchuan (born 1935)	曹刚川	15 November 2002	21 October 2007	4 years, 340 days	16th	
General	Guo Boxiong (born 1942)	郭伯雄	15 November 2002	15 November 2012	10 years, 0 days	16th, 17th	
General	Xu Caihou (1943–2015)	徐才厚	19 September 2004	15 November 2012	8 years, 57 days	16th, 17th	
—	Xi Jinping (born 1953)	习近平	18 October 2010	15 November 2012	2 years, 28 days	17th	
General	Fan Changlong (born 1947)	范长龙	4 November 2012	25 October 2017	4 years, 355 days	18th	
Air Force General	Xu Qiliang (1950–2025)	许其亮	4 November 2012	23 October 2022	9 years, 353 days	18th, 19th	
General	Zhang Youxia (born 1950)	张又侠	25 October 2017	21 January 2026	8 years, 318 days	19th, 20th	
General	He Weidong (born 1957)	何卫东	23 October 2022	17 October 2025	2 years, 359 days	20th	
General	Zhang Shengmin (born 1958)	张升民	23 October 2025	Incumbent	320 days	20th	

== State commissions ==
=== CPG People's Revolutionary Military Commission (1949–54) ===
Vice-chairmen of the People's Revolutionary Military Commission of the Central People's Government (October 1949 – September 1954)
Military rank	Name (birth–death)	Hanzi	Took office	Left office	Tenure	Portrait
formerly General (Republic of China)	Zhu De (1886–1976)	朱德	1 October 1949	27 September 1954	4 years, 361 days	
—	Liu Shaoqi (1898–1969)	刘少奇	1 October 1949	27 September 1954	4 years, 361 days	
formerly Lieutenant General (Republic of China)	Zhou Enlai (1898–1976)	周恩来	1 October 1949	27 September 1954	4 years, 361 days	
formerly Lieutenant General (Republic of China)	Peng Dehuai (1898–1974)	彭德怀	1 October 1949	27 September 1954	4 years, 361 days	
formerly General, 1st Class (Republic of China)	Cheng Qian (1882–1968)	程潜	19 October 1949	27 September 1954	4 years, 343 days	
formerly Lieutenant General (Republic of China)	Lin Biao (1907–1971)	林彪	5 November 1951	27 September 1954	2 years, 326 days	
—	Gao Gang (1905–1954)	高岗	5 November 1951	27 September 1954	2 years, 326 days	
formerly Lieutenant General (Republic of China)	Liu Bocheng (1892–1986)	刘伯承	19 June 1954	27 September 1954	110 days	
formerly Lieutenant General (Republic of China)	He Long (1896–1969)	贺龙	19 June 1954	27 September 1954	110 days	
	Chen Yi (1901–1971)	陈毅	19 June 1954	27 September 1954	110 days	
	Luo Ronghuan (1902–1963)	罗荣桓	19 June 1954	27 September 1954	110 days	
formerly Major General (Republic of China)	Xu Xiangqian (1901–1990)	徐向前	19 June 1954	27 September 1954	110 days	
formerly Major General (Republic of China)	Nie Rongzhen (1889–1992)	聂荣臻	19 June 1954	27 September 1954	110 days	
formerly Lieutenant General (Republic of China)	Ye Jianying (1897–1986)	叶剑英	19 June 1954	27 September 1954	110 days	

=== PRC National Defense Commission (1954–75) ===
Vice-chairmen of the National Defense Commission of the People's Republic of China (1954–1975)
Military rank	Name (birth–death)	Hanzi	Took office	Left office	Tenure	Term(s)	Portrait
formerly General, 2nd Class (Republic of China)	Long Yun (1884–1962)	龙云	29 September 1954	1 February 1958	3 years, 125 days	1st	
Marshal	Zhu De (1886–1976)	朱德	29 September 1954	28 April 1959	4 years, 211 days	1st	
Marshal	Luo Ronghuan (1902–1963)	罗荣桓	29 September 1954	16 December 1963	9 years, 78 days	1st, 2nd	
Marshal	Peng Dehuai (1898–1974)	彭德怀	29 September 1954	4 January 1965	10 years, 97 days	1st, 2nd	
—	Deng Xiaoping (1904–1997)	邓小平	29 September 1954	12 August 1966	11 years, 317 days	1st, 2nd, 3rd	
formerly General, 1st Class (Republic of China)	Cheng Qian (1882–1968)	程潜	29 September 1954	5 April 1968	13 years, 189 days	1st, 2nd, 3rd	
formerly General, 2nd Class (Republic of China)	Zhang Zhizhong (1895–1969)	张治中	29 September 1954	10 April 1969	14 years, 193 days	1st, 2nd, 3rd	
Marshal	He Long (1896–1969)	贺龙	29 September 1954	9 June 1969	14 years, 253 days	1st, 2nd, 3rd	
Marshal	Lin Biao (1907–1971)	林彪	29 September 1954	13 September 1971	16 years, 349 days	1st, 2nd, 3rd	
Marshal	Chen Yi (1901–1972)	陈毅	29 September 1954	6 January 1972	17 years, 99 days	1st, 2nd, 3rd	
formerly General, 2nd Class (Republic of China)	Fu Zuoyi (1895–1974)	傅作义	29 September 1954	19 April 1974	19 years, 202 days	1st, 2nd, 3rd	
Marshal	Liu Bocheng (1892–1986)	刘伯承	29 September 1954	13 January 1975	20 years, 196 days	1st, 2nd, 3rd	
Marshal	Ye Jianying (1897–1986)	叶剑英	29 September 1954	13 January 1975	20 years, 196 days	1st, 2nd, 3rd	
Marshal	Xu Xiangqian (1901–1990)	徐向前	29 September 1954	13 January 1975	20 years, 196 days	1st, 2nd, 3rd	
Marshal	Nie Rongzhen (1889–1992)	聂荣臻	29 September 1954	13 January 1975	20 years, 196 days	1st, 2nd, 3rd	
formerly General, 2nd Class (Republic of China)	Wei Lihuang (1897–1960)	卫立煌	28 April 1959	17 January 1960	264 days	2nd	
formerly General, 2nd Class (Republic of China)	Cai Tingkai (1892–1968)	蔡廷锴	16 April 1962	25 April 1968	6 years, 9 days	2nd, 3rd	
Grand General	Luo Ruiqing (1906–1978)	罗瑞卿	4 January 1965	13 January 1975	10 years, 9 days	3rd	

=== PRC Central Military Commission (1983–present) ===
Vice-chairmen of the Central Military Commission of the People's Republic of China (1983–present)
Military rank	Name (birth–death)	Hanzi	Took office	Left office	Tenure	Term(s)	Portrait
Marshal	Ye Jianying (1897–1986)	叶剑英	6 June 1983	22 October 1986	3 years, 138 days	6th	
Marshal	Xu Xiangqian (1901–1990)	徐向前	6 June 1983	13 April 1988	4 years, 312 days	6th	
—	Yang Shangkun (1907–1998)	杨尚昆	6 June 1983	31 March 1993	9 years, 298 days	6th, 7th	
—	Zhao Ziyang (1919–2005)	赵紫阳	25 April 1987	23 June 1989	2 years, 59 days	7th	
General	Liu Huaqing (1916–2011)	刘华清	28 March 1993	5 March 1998	4 years, 342 days	8th	
General	Chi Haotian (born 1929)	迟浩田	28 March 1993	5 March 2003	9 years, 342 days	8th, 9th	
General	Zhang Wannian (1928–2015)	张万年	28 March 1993	5 March 2003	9 years, 342 days	8th, 9th	
—	Hu Jintao (born 1942)	胡锦涛	31 October 1999	13 March 2005	5 years, 133 days	9th, 10th	
General	Guo Boxiong (born 1942)	郭伯雄	16 March 2003	16 March 2013	10 years, 0 days	10th, 11th	
General	Cao Gangchuan (born 1935)	曹刚川	16 March 2003	14 March 2008	4 years, 364 days	10th	
General	Xu Caihou (1943–2015)	徐才厚	13 March 2005	14 March 2013	8 years, 0 days	10th, 11th	
—	Xi Jinping (born 1953)	习近平	28 October 2010	14 March 2013	2 years, 137 days	11th	
General	Fan Changlong (born 1947)	范长龙	16 March 2013	18 March 2018	5 years, 2 days	12th	
Air Force General	Xu Qiliang (1950–2025)	许其亮	16 March 2013	11 March 2023	9 years, 360 days	12th, 13th	
General	Zhang Youxia (born 1950)	张又侠	18 March 2018	21 January 2026	8 years, 174 days	13th, 14th	
General	He Weidong (born 1957)	何卫东	11 March 2023	17 October 2025	2 years, 220 days	14th	
General	Zhang Shengmin (born 1958)	张升民	28 October 2025	Incumbent	315 days	14th	
