= Xie Wuliang =

Chinese scholar, poet, and statesman

- 谢无量
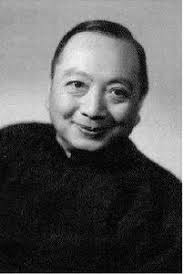

Member of the Control Yuan
- In office 1931–1949

Vice President of the Central Research Institute of Culture and History
- In office 1964–1960

Personal details
- Born: June 28, 1884 Lezhi County, Sichuan Province, Qing Empire
- Died: December 7, 1964 (aged 80) Beijing

Xie Wuliang (Chinese: 谢无量; pinyin: Xìe Wúlìang; June 28, 1884 – December 7, 1964) was a modern Chinese scholar, literary theorist, poet, calligrapher, artifact collector, and politician.

During the Republic of China (1912–1949) period, he held various positions, from Chairman of the General Staff of the Army and Navy Marshal stronghold of the Republic of China to Sun Yat-sen's Confidential Secretary to instructor of the Whampoa Military Academy and others. From 1931 to 1949, he was a member of the Control Yuan. In 1948, he was elected as a member of the first National Assembly representing Lezhi County, Sichuan Province. After the founding of the People's Republic of China, he served as a member of the National Committee of the Chinese People’s Political Consultative Conference, a professor at Renmin University of China, and the vice president of the Central Research Institute of Culture and History.

He is the author of "Outline of Buddhism", "History of Chinese Literature", "History of Chinese Women's Literature", "Two Great Writers of Common People's Literature", "Research Notes on the Book of Songs", "New Theory of Chu Ci", "History of Chinese Philosophy", "Research on Ancient Political Thought", and other books. He also published works such as "Xie Wuliang's Self-Written Poems" and "Xie Wuliang's Calligraphy".
