= Fujian delegation to the National People's Congress =

Fujian Delegation to the National People's Congress
- 全国人民代表大会福建省代表团
- Delegation for the National People's Congress
- Map showing the location of Fujian Province
- Electoral unit: Fujian Province
- Population: 41,540,086

Current Delegation
- Created: 1954
- Seats: 74
- Head of delegation: Zhou Zuyi
- Provincial People's Congress: Fujian Provincial People's Congress

The Fujian delegation to the National People's Congress is a delegation composed of deputies representing Fujian Province within the National People's Congress (NPC), the supreme organ of state power of the People's Republic of China. NPC deputies from the Fujian Province are officially elected by the Fujian Provincial People's Congress.

== List of deputies ==
Year	NPC sessions	Deputies	Number of deputies	Ref.
1954	1st	Wang Yanan, Tian Fuda, Li Zhizhong, He Sui, Lin Yixin, Wu Chuanyu (deceased), Hou Zhenya, Zhuang Changgong, Zhang Dingcheng, Chen Shaokuan, Qin Xiudian, Yu Hongzheng, Liu Yongsheng, Liu Chongle, Zheng Yimu, Xie Bingxin, Xie Xuehong, Su Hua (resigned): By-election on June 15, 1956: Ye Fei, Zhang Junxiu	18	
1959	2nd	Wang Yanan, Tian Fuda, Jiang Yizhen, Liu Yongsheng, Liu Chongle, Zhuang Changgong, Chen Shaokuan, He Sui, Zheng Yiyi, Lin Yixin, Zhang Dingcheng, Jin Han, Zhou Juzhen (female), Hong Shunli, Hou Zhenya, Liang Lingguang, Xie Bingxin (female), Xie Xuetang	18	
1964	3rd	Fang Yi, Wang Li, Wang Wenbo, Wang Shirui, Wang Yanan, Wang Weiyu, Wang Rongbin, Lu Shiqian, Lu Haoran, Lu Jiaxi, Ye Zhongyang, Ye Zhupei, Tian Fuda, Jiang Yizhen, Liu Yongsheng, Liu Chongle, Liu Yin, Liu Jinghe, Ren Manjun, Li Lairong, Li Zhiqing, Li Huanzhi, Wu Jiaoru, He Qixin, He Sui, Zhang Zhaohan, Zhang Dingcheng, Lu Cai, Chen Shaokuan, Chen Guizhen, Zheng Danfu, Zheng Zhong, Lin Yixin, Lin Haiyun, Lin Biying, Lin Mohan, Luo Bingqin, Jin Han, Hong Xiucong, Zhong Dahu, Hou Zhenya, He Minxue, Guo Ruiren, Yuan Liuzhong, Liang Shoupan, Chang Qi, Xie Bingxin, Xie Xuetang, Huang Guozhang, Huang Xinmin, Fu Chengyi, Cai Qirui, Pan Zhongyu, Wei Jinshui	54	
1975	4th	Yu Lingjiao, Wang Yunji, Wang Shirui, Wang Xiakang, Wang Hui, Tian Yumin, Zhu Guangyao, Zhu Fenlan (female), Zhuang Zhipeng, Liu Yongsheng, Liu Qingtu, Liu Jiesheng, Liu Huiwen, Liu Duanyi, Jiang Liyin, Xu Xiaoqi, Du Qingrong, Wu Xianmu, Li Qinglin, Li Huaisheng, Yang Mulan (female), Xiao Helai, Wu Congzheng, Wu Yarong, Wu Jinzhang, Zhang Hua, Zhang Huocheng, Zhang Weizi, Chen Hong (female), Chen Jinding, Chen Zhenkun, Fan Kuaizhi (female), Lin Wenwu, Lin Xiuhua (female), Lin Meiying (female), Zhuo Shouru, Zhuo Qiyan, Zhuo Xiong, Luo Nian, Zhou Xuefeng (female), Hu Xinyu, Zhong Zufei (female), Guo Lidi (female), Guo Ruiren, Huang Yaguang, Huang Kehe, Huang Zude, Huang Jiatu, Huang Yuxiang, Liang Meizhu (female), Han Guonan, Cai Qirui, Liao Zhigao	53	
1978	5th	Ma Xiufa, Wang Shirui, Wang Hanjie, Wang Qiufeng, You Yangzu, Fang Yi, Li Haiqing, Lu Shiqian, Lu Jiaxi, Lan Mali, Lan Aihua, Zhu Yuanding, Zhu Guangyao, Zhu Fenlan, Liu Jiuru, Liu Yongsheng, Liu Yin, Jiang Liyin, Jiang Chunguan, Ruan Jinwen, Du Xingyuan, Wu Xianmu, Li Chengde, Li Chaokun, Li Wenren, Yang Lanying, Yang Xiuyu, Wu Jiashan, Wu Jiaoru, He Ruoren, He Qiongyun, Zhang Hanrong, Zhang Huocheng, Zhang Baoying, Zhang Yinquan, Zhang Dingcheng, Zhang Fu Lian, Chen Wenjun, Chen Xunming, Chen Cunjun, Chen Xiaoqin, Chen Xizhong, Chen Yijin, Chen Keshu, Chen Chaitou, Chen Jingquan, Lin Kaiqin, Lin Tingqun, Lin Jinyun, Ouyang Jieru, Zhuo Shouru, Luo Nian, Luo Chundi, Hu Xinyu, Hou Linzhou, Hong Alu, Yao Zhimei, He Minxue, Gao Qinghe, Guo Ruiren, Huang Liangyu, Huang Helang, Huang Baoli, Huang Shunxing, Liang Meizhu, Ge Lanmei, Zeng Hanzhang, Xie Qiaoying, Xie Bingxin, Cai Qirui, Liao Zhigao, Liao Amei, Pan Zhongyu	73	
1983	6th	Wang Yiping, Wang Dajun, Wang Shirui, Wang Weiyun, Wang Shouguan, Deng Chao, Ai Shenghuang, Feng Yimiao, Liu Mingfu, Liu Peide, Jiang Peixuan, Xu Dingli, Li Shaohua, Li Jingxi, Li Wenren, Wu Yuanjin, Qiu Jincai, He Ruoren, Yu Baosheng, Zhang Wenyu, Zhang Jizhong, Zhang Yi, Lu Zifen, Chen Riliang, Chen Xunming, Chen Dachang, Chen Xizhong, Chen Runci, Chen Jingrun, Chen Derun, Lin Xiue, Lin Hejin, Lin Jianmin, Lin Bizhen, Ou Jin Gang, Zhuo Zhongjiang, Luo Siqi, Zheng Huiying, Zheng Fuquan, Xiang Nan, Hu Hong, Hu Ming, Hu Xilan, Zhong Saihua, Hong Yongshi, Hong Sisi, Yao Zhimei, Yuan Aizhu, Jia Jiumin, Xia Meiqiong, Xu Fengxing, Gao Shiqi, Guo Yuehua, Guo Ruiren, Huang Nianlai, Huang Xiuzhen, Huang Ming, Huang Jinling, Gong Xiong, Zhang Yongming, Zhang Chunbao, Liang Meiyu, Han Guopan, Zhi Shichang, Lai Aiguang, Cai Li, Liao Amei, Pan Keliang, Pan Kuoxiang, Dai Shuixia	70	
1988	7th	Wang Shirui, Wang Hanbin, Wang Zhaoguo, Wang Keming, Wang Lingmei, Wang Runsheng, Wang Weiyun, Wang Shouguan, Wang Yaohua, Feng Yimiao, Liu Yuping, Liu Zhongzhu, Liu Qinrui, Ruan Wuqi, Yan Jiafa, Li Lishi, Li Jingxi, Li Wenren, Yang Jun, Wu Xiaokai, Wu Songguang, Wu Songgang, Wu Yuanjin, Yu Baosheng, Zou Erjun, Ying Mozhang, Zhang Mingjun, Zhang Peihuan, Chen Riliang, Chen Xunming, Chen Guangyi, Chen Xizhong, Chen Quanyuan, Chen Juewan, Chen Ying Guan, Chen Weiyao, Chen Zengguang, Chen Derun, Lin Yuankun, Lin Lanying, Lin Xiue, Lin Jingjing, Zheng Yizheng, Zheng Meizhu, Zheng Huiying, Zheng Ruiying, Zheng Saibing, Zheng Lin, Hu Hong, Yao Huannian, Hong Yongshi, Jia Jiumin, Guo Ruiren, Huang Youxiong, Huang Nianlai, Huang Shengye, Huang Xiuzhen, Huang Jinling, Gong Yifei, Peng Qunfang, Jiang Rongjuan, Han Yulin, Han Yiqun, Su Xiuyu, Cheng Xu, You Dexin, Lai Yongxing, Lai Aiguang, Lei Meijiao, Yan Changcheng	70	
1993	8th	Wang Xiaoru, Wang Keming, Wang Shouguan, Wang Yaohua, Lu Jiaxi, Zhuang Biaofeng, Liu Yuping, Liu Zhongzhu, Tang Jinhua, Qi Ruqin, Xu Kairui, Ruan Wuqi, Wu Xiumei, Li Lishi, Li Zhenying, Li Jingxi, Li Wenren, Yang Chunbo, Wu Xiaokai, Wu Xuliang, Wu Songgang, He Shaochuan, He Jing, Yu Baosheng, Yu Jingjuan, Zhang Ganxun, Zhang Binsheng, Chen Zihe, Chen Riliang, Chen Guangyi, Chen Xizhong, Chen Quanyuan, Chen Zhangliang, Chen Lianhe, Chen Huizhu, Lin Damu, Lin Lanying, Lin Zaisheng, Lin Kemin, Lin Xiue, Lin Zongtang, Zheng Huasen, Zheng Xiuqin, Zheng Ruiying, Zheng Biyi, Ke Xueqi, Yao Huannian, Shi Xingmou, Hong Shaohu, Hong Yongshi, Hong Zhiming, Yuan Qitong, Jia Qinglin, Gao Xiang, Huang Xiaojing, Huang Changxi, Huang Youxiong, Huang Shanhua, Gong Yifei, Ge Lanmei, Han Yulin, Zeng Jinfeng, Xie Huaan, Lan Yufeng, Kai Qinghai, Lai Aiguang, Cai Shiqing, Pan Xincheng, Pan Xiuzhen	69	
1998	9th	Xi Jinping, Deng Liping, Deng Xiaowei, Lu Hengqi, Lu Jinlai, Shuai Jingao, Feng Yulan, Xu Jinhe, Su Changpei, Wu Xiumei, Li Chuan, Li Tiansen, Li Shundi, Li Jiabao, Yang Chunbo, Yang Yinyu, Wu Naiguo, Wu Jianhua, He Shaochuan, He Lifeng, Song Defu, Zhang Hanhui, Zhang Fan, Zhang Huaan, Zhang Jiakun, Zhang Binsheng, Chen Riliang, Chen Guangyi, Chen Mingyi, Chen Mingshu, Chen Mingkui, Chen Jiansheng, Chen Zhangliang Chen Huigeng, Chen Fusheng, Chen Huizhu, Lin Xiue, Lin Qiang, Lin Qun, Ouyang Yuanhe, Luo Gan, Zhou Jinhuo, Zhou Yici, Zheng Xiuqin, Zhong Meiyun (She ethnic group), Rao Zuoxun, Hong Yongshi, Yuan Qitong, Xu Chengyun, Weng Fulin, Gao Jiamin, Gao Xiang, Huang Changxi, Huang Wenlin, Huang Taikang, Liang Wanqing, Zeng Jinfeng, You Xiansheng, Xie Lianhui, Kai Qinghai (Gaoshan ethnic group), Lai Aiguang, Cai Qi, Xue Guoqiang, Wei Kemei	64	
2003	10th	Wang Jianshuang, Wang Jing (female), Deng Liping, Lu Zhangong, Shuai Jingao, Ye Jige, Feng Yulan (female), Zhu Shufang (female), Hua Fuzhou (female), Liu Cigui, Xu Jinhe, Su Wenjin, Wu Xiumei (female), Li Bicheng, Li Chunxing, Li Yuemin, He Tuanjing, Song Defu, Zhang Shuhua (female), Zhang Huaan, Zhang Xiujuan (female), Zhang Changping, Zhang Jiakun, Lu Zhihua, Chen Guangyi, Chen Xiaoping (female), Chen Zhangliang, Chen Fusheng, Chen Huizhu (female), Chen Luyun (female) Lin Zhaoshu, Lin Zhelong, Lin Qiang, Lin Qun, Ouyang Yuanhe, Luo Gan, Luo Shurong, Zhou Jinhuo, Zheng Daoxi, Zheng Shuanggao, Lian Zhixuan, Zhong Meiyun (female, She ethnic group), Shi Zuolin, Shi Xingmou, Xu Chengyun, Xu Qian, Gao Xiang (female), Huang Xiaojing, Huang Shuangyue (female), Huang Taikang, Huang Ruilin, Kang Biao, Zhang Liansheng, Zeng Jinfeng (female), Zeng Jingping (female), Xie Lianhui, Kai Qinghai (Gaoshan ethnic group), Lai Guiyong, Lai Aiguang, Zhan Yi, Xue Guoqiang, Dai Zhongchuan, Wei Kemei	63	
2008	11th	Ding Shizhong (Hui nationality), Wang Xianrong (female), Wang Jing (female), Deng Liping, Deng Benyuan, Lu Zhangong, Zhu Ming, Zhu Huigang, Zhuang Xian, Zhuang Zhensheng, Liu Cigui, Liu Daoqi, Liu Dezhang, Xu Shihui, Xu Jinhe, Yan Yixin, Su Wenjin, Du Min (female), Li Mingrong (female), Li Jianguo, Li Yuxi, Li Xinyan, Wang Yifu, Zhang Xiujuan (female), Zhang Guosheng, Zhang Changping, Zhang Jian, Zhang Jiakun, Chen Shaoyong, Chen Wendong, Chen Zhengtong, Chen Zhili (female), Chen Xiurong (Female), Chen Zhonghe, Chen Xiaoping (female), Chen Jiadong, Chen Sixi, Fan Fangping, Lin Xinxin (female), Lin Zhelong, Lin Qiang, Ouyang Yuanhe, Zhou Lianqing, Zheng Songyan, Zheng Jie (female, Manchu), Zhao Jing (female), Shi Zuolin, Jia Xitai, Xu Chengyun, Gao Xiaoming, Huang Xiaojing, Huang Meiyuan (female), Huang Haihui, Gong Qinggai, Zhang Liansheng, Zeng Jingping (female), Xie Huaan, Kai Qinghai (Gaoshan ethnic group), Lai Anshan, Lei Jinmei (female, She ethnic group), Bao Shaokun, Dai Zhongchuan	62	
2013	12th	Ding Shizhong (Hui), Ma Xinlan (female), Wang Guangyuan, Wang Meixiang (female), You Quan, Che Shanglun, Deng Liping, Deng Wenshan, Deng Benyuan, Ye Shuangyu, Fu Xianzheng, Liu Keqing, Liu Dezhang, Xu Shihui, Yan Yixin, Su Wenjin, Su Shulin, Su Zengtian, Li Chuan, Li Lihui, Li Zhensheng, Li Xinyan, Yang Yimin, Yang Hai, Wu Hongqin (female), Zhang Yuzhen (female), Zhang Zhaomin, Zhang Zhinan, Chen Naiwu, Chen Wenbin, Chen Junwei, Chen Xiurong (female), Chen Guoying, Chen Sixi, Chen Zixuan (female), Lin Hexing, Lin Xinxin (female), Lin Baojin, Lin Tengjiao, Zhou Lianqing, Zheng Kuicheng, Zheng Xincong, Zhao Hongzhu, Zhao Jing (female), Zhong Xueling (female, She), Hong Jie, Yuan Jingui, Xia Peng, Ni Yingda, Xu Qian, Weng Guoxing, Guo Jun (female), Huang Xiaojing, ~~Huang Shaoping (female)~~ Huang Zhifeng, Huang Lei (female, Gaoshan ethnic group), Zhang Liansheng, Liang Jianyong, Jiao Nianzhi, Shu Ting (female), Zeng Yunying (female), Zeng Jingping (female), Xie Liying (female), Xie Zhibo, Cai Jin'an, Teng Xiulan (female), Dai Zhongchuan, Wei Lan (female)	68	
2018	13th	Ding Shizhong (Hui), Yu Weiguo, Wang Guangyuan, Wang Hongxiang, Wang Pei, Wang Yi, You Mengjun, Deng Liping, Lu Yusheng, Ye Shuangyu, Fu Xianzheng, Feng Hongchang, Lan Pingyong (She), Lan Zhen (female, She), Zhuang Jiahan, Liu Yuan, Liu Xuexin, Liu Xianxiang, Xu Weize, Yan Zheng, Li Jianhui, Li Yuefeng, Wu Jinbi, Wu Xielin, Yu Hongsheng, Shen Yueyue (female), Zhang Guangmin, Zhang Yuzhen (female), Zhang Zhijun, Zhang Qinrong (female), Zhang Linshun, Zhang Rong, Zhang Lu (female), Lu Luanmei (female), Chen Guoying, ~~Chen Jiadong~~, Chen Zixuan (female), ~~Lin Wenyao~~, Lin Huazhong, Lin Xinglu, Lin Tengjiao, Zheng Kuicheng, Zheng Jiajian, Zhao Jing (female), Liu Hong (female), Hou Yanmei (female), Hong Jie, Hong Bo, Xu Ke (female), Weng Guoxing, Guo Jun (female), Guo Jingjing (born 1985) (Female), Guo Xiwen, Tang Dengjie, Huang Maoxing, Huang Aimin (female), Huang Lei (female, Gaoshan ethnic group), Kang Tao, Zhang Liansheng, Su Qiong (female, Tujia ethnic group), Shu Ting (female), Shi Zewu, Zeng Yunying (female), Zeng Jingping (female), Lei Jinyu (female, She ethnic group), Li Lizhang, Pan Yue (female), Xue Yufeng (female), Huo Min	69	
2023	14th	Yu Ningjie, Yu Weiguo, Wang Yongcheng, Wang Hongmei, Wang Jinzu, Wang Fei, Wang Yifang, Wang Yan, Fang Huayu, Fang Huajuan, Lu Yusheng, Fu Xianzheng, Feng Hongchang, Lan Pingyong, Zewu, Zhuang Jiahan, Liu Aiying, Jiang Yuanxun, Xu Guangyuan, Yan Keshi, Li Yuping, Li Xinghu, Li Xi, Li Guoqiang, Li Chun, Yang Guohao, Wu Xiaoying, Wu Xiande, Wu Jinbi, Wu Hongqin, Chi Yaoyun, Zhang Yuzhen, Zhang Yongning, Zhang Rong, Lu Luanmei, Chen Donghai, Chen Guoying, Chen Zixuan, Lin Zhengjia, Lin Yao, Lin Huazhong, Luo Enping, Jin Yinqiang, Zhou Hong, Zhou Zuyi, Zhou Lianqing, Zhao Long, Hu Sheng, Zhong Tuanyu, Zhong Jun, Hou Jianjun, Hou Yanmei, Qin Yuan, Yuan Chaohong, Weng Zuquan, Guo Jingjing, Huang Wenhui, Huang Shizhong, Huang Zhixian, Huang Maoxing, Huang Jianbo, Huang Lei, Liang Jianyong, Zeng Yunying, Zeng Xuqing, Wen Qing, Qian Fangli, Cai Jinchai, Cai Zhansheng, Cai Jiming, Liao Hong, Pan Yue	74	
