= Li Jinai =

Chinese general

- 李继耐

Director-General of the People's Liberation Army General Political Department
- In office September 2004 – October 2012
- Preceded by: Xu Caihou
- Succeeded by: Zhang Yang

Head of the People's Liberation Army General Armaments Department
- In office November 2002 – September 2004
- Preceded by: Cao Gangchuan
- Succeeded by: Chen Bingde

Political Commissar of the People's Liberation Army General Armaments Department
- In office April 1998 – November 2002
- Preceded by: Dai Xuejiang
- Succeeded by: Chi Wanchun

Personal details
- Born: July 1942 (age 84) Teng County, Shandong, China
- Party: Chinese Communist Party
- Education: Harbin Institute of Technology

Military service
- Allegiance: People's Republic of China
- Branch/service: People's Liberation Army Ground Force
- Years of service: 1967–2012
- Rank: General

Li Jinai (simplified Chinese: 李继耐; traditional Chinese: 李繼耐; pinyin: Lǐ Jìnài; born July 1942) is a general in the People's Liberation Army.

== Biography ==
Li Jinai was born in Teng County (now Tengzhou), Shandong in July 1942. He joined the Chinese Communist Party (CCP) in May 1965 and joined the People's Liberation Army (PLA) in December 1967. He graduated from the Harbin Institute of Technology in 1966 majoring in Engineering Mechanics.

He was rose to the General Political Department of the PLA in 1985 and became the deputy director there in 1990. From 1992 to 1998, he served the State Commission of Science and Technology for National Defense Industry as deputy political commissar and later political commissar. From 1998 to 2002, he was the political commissar and deputy party secretary of the General Armament Department and was elected as director of that department as well as a member of the Central Military Commission (CMC) of the CCP in 2002. One year later, he was elected as a member of CMC of the state.

In September 2004, he was appointed the director of the General Political Department of the PLA while holding the position of member of CMC of the party and the state.

He was an alternate member of the 14th Central Committee of the Chinese Communist Party and a regular member of the 15th, 16th and 17th central committees.

Military offices
New title	Political Commissar of the People's Liberation Army General Armaments Department; 1998–2002	Succeeded by Chi Wanchun
Preceded by Cao Gangchuan	Head of the People's Liberation Army General Armaments Department; 2002–2004	Succeeded by Chen Bingde
Preceded by Xu Caihou	Director-general of General Political Department; 2004–2012	Succeeded by Zhang Yang
