= 15th National Congress of the Chinese Communist Party =

1997 Chinese Communist Party conference

15th National Congress of the Chinese Communist Party 中国共产党第十五次全国代表大会
- The flag of the Chinese Communist Party
- Begins: September 12, 1997
- Ends: September 18, 1997
- Locations: Great Hall of the People, Beijing, China
- Previous event: 14th National Congress of the Chinese Communist Party (1992)
- Next event: 16th National Congress of the Chinese Communist Party (2002)
- Participants: 2,048 delegates
- Major events: Election of the 15th Central Committee and 15th Central Commission for Discipline Inspection
- Leader: Jiang Zemin (Leader of the Chinese Communist Party)

The 15th National Congress of the Chinese Communist Party was held in Beijing between September 12 and 18, 1997. It was preceded by the 14th National Congress of the Chinese Communist Party and was followed by the 16th National Congress of the Chinese Communist Party. 2,048 delegates and 60 specially invited delegates represented the party's estimated 59 million members.

The congress elected a 344-member 15th CCP Central Committee, as well as a 115-member Central Commission for Discipline Inspection (CCDI). This change in membership made the new average age of the CCP 55 and percentage of members holding university or college level education 92.4%. Jiang Zemin was reappointed CCP General Secretary and Chairman of the Central Military Commission.

15th National Congress of the Chinese Communist Party
- Simplified Chinese: 中国共产党第十五次全国代表大会
- Traditional Chinese: 中國共產黨第十五次全國代表大會
Transcriptions
Standard Mandarin
- Hanyu Pinyin: Zhōngguó gòngchǎndǎng dì shíwǔ cì quánguó dàibiǎo dàhuì

Abbreviated name
- Chinese: 十五大
Transcriptions
Standard Mandarin
- Hanyu Pinyin: Shíwǔ dà

== Policy ==
Jiang Zemin called for establishing a socialist rule of law. The Congress set goals on "forming a socialist system of laws with Chinese characteristics".

The 15th National Congress stated that "the non-public economy is a significant component of China's socialist market economy."

Regarding state-owned enterprises (SOEs) of China, Jiang advocated that large SOEs should be further strengthened by merging them into larger groups. This concept became known as grasping the large, letting go of the small.

=== Party Constitution amendments ===
The constitution was changed to make Deng Xiaoping Theory a guiding ideology of the Chinese Communist Party alongside Marxism–Leninism and Mao Zedong Thought. It was revealed in a presentation by Jiang Zemin that an "All-Round Advancement would be adopted toward the Cause of Building Socialism with Chinese Characteristics well into the 21st Century."
