= Jia Song =

Jia Song or Jiasong may refer to:

- Song Jia (actress, born 1962) (宋佳), Chinese actress
- Song Jia (actress, born 1980) (宋佳), Chinese actress and singer
- Jiasong, Nanhe County, Hebei, China, a township-level division of Hebei
- Jiasong, Zhenping County, Henan, China, a township-level division of Henan

== See also ==
- Song Jia (disambiguation)
- Song (disambiguation)
- JIA (disambiguation)
