= Song Jia =

Song Jia may refer to:

- Song Jia (actress, born 1962) (宋佳), also known as Da Song Jia (大宋佳), Chinese actress
- Song Jia (actress, born 1980) (宋佳), also known as Xiao Song Jia (小宋佳), Chinese actress and singer

== See also ==
- JIA (disambiguation)
- Jia Song (disambiguation)
- Song (disambiguation)
- Songjia (宋家镇), a town in Ling County, Dezhou, Shandong province, China
