= Zeng Qinghong =

Chinese politician (born 1939)

- 曾庆红

Vice President of China
- In office 15 March 2003 – 15 March 2008
- President: Hu Jintao
- Preceded by: Hu Jintao
- Succeeded by: Xi Jinping

President of the Central Party School
- In office December 2002 – December 2007
- Deputy: Yu Yunyao; Su Rong
- Preceded by: Hu Jintao
- Succeeded by: Xi Jinping

Head of the Organization Department of the Chinese Communist Party
- In office March 1999 – November 2002
- General Secretary: Jiang Zemin
- Preceded by: Zhang Quanjing
- Succeeded by: He Guoqiang

Director of the General Office of the Chinese Communist Party
- In office March 1993 – March 1999
- General Secretary: Jiang Zemin
- Preceded by: Wen Jiabao
- Succeeded by: Wang Gang

Personal details
- Born: 30 July 1939 (age 87) Ji'an, Jiangxi, Republic of China
- Party: Chinese Communist Party (1960–2008)
- Spouse: Wang Fengqing
- Children: Zeng Wei
- Education: Beijing Institute of Technology
- Occupation: Control engineer

Chinese name
- Simplified Chinese: 曾庆红
- Traditional Chinese: 曾慶紅
Transcriptions
Standard Mandarin
- Hanyu Pinyin: Zēng Qìnghóng
- Wade–Giles: Tseng1 Ch'ing4-hung2

Zeng Qinghong (Chinese: 曾庆红; pinyin: Zēng Qìnghóng; Wade–Giles: Tseng¹ Ch'ing⁴-hung², born 30 July 1939) is a retired Chinese politician. He was a member of the Politburo Standing Committee of the Chinese Communist Party, China's highest leadership council, and a member of the Secretariat of the Central Committee between 2002 and 2007. He also served as the Vice President of China from 2003 to 2008. During the 1990s, Zeng was a close ally of then-Party general secretary Jiang Zemin, and was instrumental in consolidating Jiang's power. For years, Zeng was the primary force behind the party's organization and personnel.

== Early life ==
Zeng was born to a family of Hakka background in Ji'an, Jiangxi province, in July 1939. He was the son of Zeng Shan, a communist revolutionary and later Minister of the Interior, and Deng Liujin (邓六金), a notable female participant of the Long March. Zeng was the eldest of five children. He graduated from Beijing 101 Middle School and the Automatic Control Department at the Beijing Institute of Technology. Zeng was an engineer, a specialist in automatic control systems. He joined the Chinese Communist Party (CCP) in April 1960. Due to the revolutionary heritage of his father, Zeng was seen as a member of the so-called "Crown Prince Party", the descendants of veteran revolutionaries.

Zeng spent the early part of his career as a technician in the military defense industry in Beijing. He was sent down to do manual labor on People's Liberation Army bases in Hunan and Guangdong during the Cultural Revolution. With the opening of the reform era, Zeng joined the State Development and Reform Commission in 1979 and then held a series of management positions in the state petroleum sector, including a series of foreign liaison positions with the China National Offshore Oil Corporation.

== Climbing the ranks ==
In 1984, Zeng began working for the Shanghai municipal government, where he became a key ally of then-Party Committee Secretary Jiang Zemin. When Jiang was elevated to General Secretary of the Chinese Communist Party in national leadership re-shuffle following the Tiananmen Square protests of 1989, he brought Zeng Qinghong along as his adviser.

As the deputy chief of the General Office of the Chinese Communist Party from 1989 to 1993, Zeng guided Jiang, an outsider to national politics, through the inner workings of the party, military and bureaucratic structure in Beijing. He promoted Jiang's leadership and thinking, broadened Jiang's network, and became Jiang's right-hand-man. Over the 1990s, Zeng consolidated control of party organs responsible for the appointment of cadres to important political positions. As head of the party's Organization Department from 1999 to 2002, Zeng strengthened Jiang's position by promoting members of the Jiang's "Shanghai clique" to leading central and regional posts. He also helped propagate Jiang's guiding political philosophy known as the "Three Represents" inside the party.

Over the next decade, he acquired a reputation as Jiang's 'hatchet man' against rivals. In 1992 he supposedly helped Jiang remove President Yang Shangkun and elder PLA General Yang Baibing, who threatened Jiang's support within the military. Then, he used an anti-corruption campaign to orchestrate the downfall of Beijing party chief and Jiang's foe Chen Xitong. Because he was seen to represent highly partisan interests, many of Jiang's factional opponents were said to be highly resistant to Zeng joining the Politburo as a full member for years. However, Jiang made it clear that a 'pre-condition' for his stepping down at the 16th Party Congress was for Zeng to become a member of the elite Politburo Standing Committee.

== Politburo Standing Committee ==
At the 16th Party Congress held in 2002, Zeng became a member of the 16th Central Committee, a member of its Politburo and of the Politburo Standing Committee (PSC), the Party's central decision-making body, as well as serving as a member of the Secretariat of the Chinese Communist Party, responsible for party administrative affairs and policy coordination.

During his term in the PSC, although he was formally ranked fifth, Zeng was seen as a 'power broker' in the party, believed to possess power that was second only to General secretary Hu Jintao. Initially seen as a rival to general secretary Hu Jintao, Zeng was obliged to show a willingness to work towards consensus with the old guard following Jiang's semi-retirement.

On 6 June 2003, Zeng issued an order "not to play or sing 'The Internationale' in any provincial, city or county level party or party member meetings." The move was characterized as distancing China from orthodox communist doctrine.

Although Jiang stepped down from the PSC to make way for a younger "fourth generation" of leadership led by Hu Jintao, Jiang continued to wield significant influence on the new group of leaders, particularly through Zeng. Due in large measure to Zeng's efforts, six out of the nine new members of the Standing Committee, Wu Bangguo, Jia Qinglin, Huang Ju, Li Changchun, Luo Gan, and Zeng himself, were linked to Jiang's "Shanghai Clique" and considered his allies.

As Jiang Zemin reached the end of his term, observers speculated that Jiang may well have preferred Zeng Qinghong over Hu Jintao as his successor. But Hu prevailed in succeeding Jiang, ostensibly because Hu was 'handpicked' by former leader Deng Xiaoping. Zeng became vice-president in March 2003 at the National People's Congress held that year. During the SARS outbreak, Hu and Premier Wen Jiabao took very strong and assertive action while Zeng and other Jiang loyalists receded to the background. Zeng was also initially expected to succeed Hu as Vice Chairman of the Central Military Commission as a condition of Jiang's resignation from the chairmanship in favor of Hu. However, when Jiang stepped down on 19 September 2004, Xu Caihou, and not Zeng, became vice-chairman.

=== Shifting loyalties ===
Although initially seen as a Jiang loyalist, observers characterized Zeng as much more sophisticated and shrewd and possessing more political savvy compared to his former boss Jiang. In addition, Zeng was said to differ with Jiang's "Shanghai Clique" on policy preferences. Zeng was an important figure within the highest ranks of party leadership. He was said to be a crucial player in pushing Jiang's move towards full retirement in 2004, when Jiang relinquished his final title, Chairman of the Central Military Commission. Observers saw the push for Jiang's retirement as indicating consensus between Zeng and Hu.

In the following years, Zeng emerged as a kingmaker-style figure, and a 'point-man' for Hu to manage crises situations. After the death of Zhao Ziyang, the former party General Secretary who lost power following the Tiananmen Square protests of 1989, Zeng worked as the intermediary between the Zhao's family and the senior party leadership. Zeng also worked with Hu to manage the potential effects on China of the ouster of authoritarian regimes in Georgia, Kyrgyzstan, and Ukraine. The head of the Ministry of State Security, China's top intelligence organization, was said to report directly to Zeng, as his father was the former head of this agency. When Shanghai Party Committee Secretary Chen Liangyu was dismissed in September 2006, Zeng led the anti-corruption task force against his longtime political enemy since they were in Shanghai. Additionally, Zeng also played a leading role in coordinating the funeral service for Politburo Standing Committee member Huang Ju, who died of cancer in 2007.

=== Departure ===
At the 17th Party Congress held in 2007, Zeng departed from the Central Committee, its Politburo, and the Politburo Standing Committee. His departure, which was seen as his retirement because of age, meant that he could no longer serve on the Communist Party's secretariat nor oversee the party's organization. His Vice-presidency ended in March 2008 at the 2008 National People's Congress. Before his retirement, however, Zeng used his political strength to secure the elevation of Xi Jinping and Zhou Yongkang into the Politburo Standing Committee. Xi, who succeeded Zeng in his posts of vice-president and executive secretary of the Secretariat, then became the heir apparent to succeed Hu Jintao as China's top leader. Zhou, who was his closest subordinate in his 'Oil Clique', became the most powerful Secretary of the Central Political and Legal Affairs Commission. Since then Zeng has made public appearances only on a few ceremonial occasions, such as the 30th anniversary of the Third plenum of the 11th Central Committee in 2008. In 2023, Zeng reportedly led a group of party veterans in reprimanding Xi at the annual Beidaihe meeting.

=== Son's wealth ===
In 2008, Zeng's son, Zeng Wei (曾伟), paid over A$32 million (~US$24 million) to buy a luxurious Australian property located in Sydney; at the time, it was said to be the third most expensive residential property transaction in Australia. He further caused controversy with his fight to demolish and rebuild it. In 2007, an exposé published by finance magazine Caijing alleged that Zeng Wei had, through a series of complex corporate vehicles, completed the purchase of power generation giant Shandong Luneng at 70 billion yuan (~$10 billion) below market value, and that Zeng Wei was, for all intents and purposes, the real owner of the company despite his name not appearing in corporate documents.

== Awards and honors ==
- Grand Officer of the Order of Mono (Togo, 2004)

== See also ==
- Politics of the People's Republic of China
- History of China (2002–2012)

Party political offices
Preceded by Wen Jiabao	Director of the General Office of the Chinese Communist Party; 1993–1999	Succeeded by Wang Gang
Preceded by Zhang Quanjing	Head of the Organization Department of the Chinese Communist Party; 1999–2002	Succeeded by He Guoqiang
Political offices
Preceded by Hu Jintao	Vice President of China; 2003–2008	Succeeded by Xi Jinping
Academic offices
Preceded by Hu Jintao	President of the Central Party School; 2002–2007	Succeeded by Xi Jinping
Order of precedence
Preceded by Jia Qinglin; Conference chairman	5th Rank of the Chinese Communist Party; 16th Politburo Standing Committee	Succeeded by Huang Ju; Vice Premier
