= Zhou Zhengyi =

Chinese businessman (born 1961)

- Born: Yangpu District, Shanghai
- Other names: Chau Ching Ngai
- Occupations: businessman property developer
- Known for: 11th richest man in China (1990s–2000s)
- Criminal charges: stock manipulation fraud bribery embezzlement
- Criminal status: 16 years Imprisonment in Shanghai Municipal No. 2 People's Intermediate Court (Since November 2007)
- Spouse: Sandy Mo Yuk-ping

Zhou Zhengyi (Chinese: 周正毅; pinyin: Zhōu Zhèngyì; born 23 April 1961), known in Hong Kong as Chau Ching Ngai, is a businessman and property developer from Shanghai, China. Zhou profited from Shanghai's real estate boom in the late 1990s to early 2000s, and was once described as the 11th richest man in China, with personal assets totalling US$320 million. In November 2007, Zhou was sentenced to sixteen years in prison for stock manipulation and fraud. He is on the "Most Wanted" list of the Independent Commission Against Corruption in Hong Kong.

== Biography ==
Born in a family of seven children in Yangpu District of Shanghai, Zhou started working at 17 without completing high school. He opened up his own wonton restaurant in Yangpu in 1978. In 1989, he opened up Meitong Restaurant (美通饭店) in Shanghai, and a karaoke bar. He opened up the grand Ah Mao Boiled Food (阿毛燉品) in 1994, and trading building materials in Shanghai. Zhou's involvement in China's newly re-established stock markets and his trading in copper futures brought about his wealth, that enabled him to move into and capitalise upon the volatile Shanghai real estate boom.

=== Financial irregularities ===
Zhou owns an unlisted holding company in Hong Kong, called New Nongkai Global Investments, and 75% of a Hong Kong-listed investment company called Shanghai Land Holdings.

Zhou was detained in June 2003 and placed under investigation for illegally acquiring state land and bank loans. On June 1, 2004, he was sentenced to three years in prison for stock market fraud. This relatively light sentence has given rise to speculation that he is cooperating with authorities in other investigations, especially Chen Liangyu, and then-Shanghai Mayor Huang Ju.

Speculation on Zhou's arrest is centred upon high-level corruption in Shanghai, which may involve protégés of Communist Party's former general secretary, Jiang Zemin. China's new leadership team of general secretary Hu Jintao and Wen Jiabao may have decided to make an example of Zhou to embarrass Jiang Zemin's associates.

On October 23, 2006, the Independent Commission Against Corruption of Hong Kong obtained approval from a Hong Kong court to arrest Zhou for allegedly providing false information to the city's stock market regulators in relation to his acquisition of a listed company in 2002. In January 2006, Zhou's wife, Sandy Mo Yuk-ping, was sentenced to 3 years' imprisonment in Hong Kong for manipulating the price of Shanghai Land shares with the aim of defrauding investors.

Zhou was arrested again by Shanghai authorities on January 21, 2007, on charges of offering bribes and forging value-added tax invoices. He has also been charged with two other counts of bribery and embezzlement. In November 2007, he was sentenced to 16 years in prison by the Shanghai Municipal No. 2 People's Intermediate Court.

Zhou has been released from prison on September 20, 2020, after the reduction of his 16 years sentence.

== See also ==
- Shanghai pension scandal
