= Shanghai pension scandal =

Corruption case in Shanghai, China

The Shanghai pension scandal was a corruption case in Shanghai, China.

Ultimately, former Party Secretary of Shanghai Chen Liangyu was implicated in the scandal and removed from office. Other high-ranking officials of the Chinese Communist Party (CCP) were also implicated such as Zhu Junyi, Qin Yu, Yu Zhifei, and Chen Chaoxian. CCP Politburo Standing Committee member and Vice Premier Huang Ju and his wife Yu Huiwen were also believed to be involved, but were never officially exposed as being part of the scandal.

== Allegations ==
Shanghai's social security fund manages 10 billion yuan in assets. The allegations were that about a third of public funds was diverted into real estate and road investment projects.

== Dismissals ==
Chen Liangyu, the Party Secretary of Shanghai and CCP Politburo member was sacked from the party in 2006, becoming the most senior party member to be dismissed in a decade. He was accused of illicitly investing billions of yuan of pension fund money in real estate, aiding illegal businesses, shielding corrupt colleagues, and abusing his position to benefit family members. On April 11, 2008, Chen, 61, was sentenced to 18 years in prison for accepting $340,000 in bribes and abusing power, specifically, for stock manipulation, financial fraud and his role in the city pension fund scandal, at the No. 2 Intermediate People's Court, Tianjin.

Also sacked and expelled from the Communist Party were:

- Yu Zhifei, the manager of Shanghai's Formula 1 racing track.
- Chen Chaoxian, a city district chief
- Ling Baoheng, the director of the Shanghai Asset Supervision Board
- Yin Guoyuan, deputy director of the Shanghai housing, land and resources administration

All those sacked will face criminal charges.

== Political context ==
Chen was seen as a senior member of the Shanghai clique who worked with former General Secretary of the Chinese Communist Party Jiang Zemin and were seen as rivals to then CCP General secretary Hu Jintao and then Chinese Premier Wen Jiabao. The dismissals were seen as strengthening the authority of Hu and Wen within the party and weakening the Jiang loyalists. Another significant result of Chen Liangyu's downfall was the rise of Xi Jinping, who was transferred to Shanghai from Zhejiang to take over the position of Party Secretary in March 2007. Later in the same year, Xi entered the CCP Politburo Standing Committee and became the successor of Hu Jintao.

== Popular culture ==
A thinly veiled reference to this scandal is a major plot element of the Chinese TV drama Dwelling Narrowness.

== See also ==
- Wang Lijun incident
