= Qin (surname) =

Qín (秦)
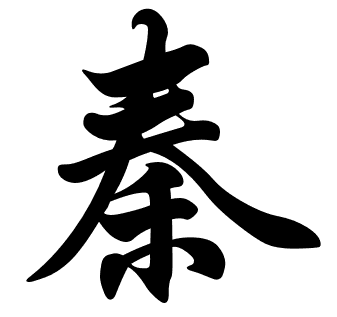
- Language: Chinese

Origin
- Language: Old Chinese
- Origin: State of Qin

Other names
- Derivative: Chin

Qín ([tɕʰǐn]) (秦) is a common Chinese surname. "Qin" is the hanyu pinyin romanization of the surname for Mandarin, the common dialect of China; other romanizations of the surname include Chin and Jin in Mandarin, Ceon and Cheun in Cantonese, and Tần (or Tan when commonly written without accent in ASCII) in Vietnamese. People with this surname are most commonly found in Henan, Shaanxi, Shandong, Sichuan, Hubei and Hebei. It is the 18th name on the Hundred Family Surnames poem.

Other surnames romanized as "Qin" include 欽/钦.

== History ==
According to the Shuowen Jiezi, the character for Qin is a compound ideogram which combined two characters: chong 舂 "to pound", and he 禾 "grain". The character originally refers to Qin Valley (秦谷) in Longxi near Tianshui, Gansu and became the name of that area. The area was granted to Feizi, a descendants of Gao Tao, by King Xiao of Zhou as a fief in the 9th century BC, which then grew into the state of Qin. In the 3rd century BC, the state of Qin unified China and became the first imperial dynasty under Qin Shi Huang. After the fall of the dynasty in 206 BC, the descendants of Qin royalty, whose ancestral name was Yíng (Chinese: 嬴), was said to have adopted the surname Qin. Many people sought to identify themselves with the Qin long since the fall of the Qin dynasty; in Japan, the Hata clan of Japan claims descent from a branch of the Qin royal family, "Hata" being the native Japanese reading for the character "Qin".

Another origin came from the Qin City (秦邑; present-day Fan County, Henan) in the state of Lu (鲁). During the early Zhou dynasty in the 10th century BC, Boqin the son of the Duke of Zhou, originally surnamed Ji (姬), was given the state of Lu, and his descendants who were assigned to the Qin estate adopted the name of their place of residence as their surname.

After the opening of the Silk Road in the 2nd century BC, Daqin (大秦, Great Qin) was the name used by the Han Chinese for the Roman Empire. Some people to the west of China arriving via the Silk Road was therefore said to have adopted the surname Qin. Various non-Han people of China also took "Qin" as their surname, such as the Mongols, the Daurs, the Manchus, and the Jurchen Moyan (抹捻 during the Jin dynasty and 穆颜 during the Manchu period).

Ancient Chinese texts recorded that one of the friends of the legendary sage king Emperor Shun (23rd century BC) was named Qin Buxu (秦不虛). However, no record exists of the later lineages of this Qin Buxu.

== Notable people with the surname ==
=== Historical ===
- Qin Kai (秦開), general of the Yan state
- Qin Wuyang (秦舞陽; died 227 BC), grandson of Qin Kai, accompanied Jing Ke to assassinate Qin Shi Huang Di in 227 BC
- Qin Jia (秦嘉), Eastern Han dynasty poet
- Qin Lang (秦朗), Wei general of the Three Kingdoms period
- Qin Qiong (秦瓊; died 638), Tang dynasty general
- Qin Zongquan (秦宗權; died 889), Tang dynasty warlord
- Qin Guan (秦觀; 1049 – c. 1100), Song dynasty writer and poet
- Qin Hui (秦檜; 1090–1155), Southern Song dynasty politician
- Qin Jiushao (秦九韶; 1202–1261), Southern Song dynasty mathematician
- Qin Liangyu (秦良玉; 1574–1648), Ming dynasty general
- Qin Rigang (秦日綱; 1821–1856), Taiping Rebellion leader
- Qin Jiwei (秦基伟; 1914–1997), general

=== Modern ===
- Qin Yi (秦怡; Qin Yi; 1922–2022), actress
- Charlie Chin (秦祥林; Qin Xianglin; born 1948), actor
- Qin Hui (秦晖; born 1953), historian
- Qin Guangrong (秦光荣; born 1954), politician
- Qin Yu (秦裕; born 1964), politician
- Qin Gang (秦刚; born 1966), diplomat
- Qin Yiyuan (秦艺源; born 1973), badminton player
- Qin Dongya (秦东亚; born 1978), judoka
- Qin Hao (秦昊; born 1979), actor
- Qin Jinjing (born 1996), China-born Australian badminton player
- Qin Lan (秦岚; born 1981), actress
- Qin Shaobo (秦少波; born 1982), acrobat and actor
- Qin Kai (秦凯; born 1986), diver
- Qin Sheng (秦升; born 1986), football player
- Ren-Chang Ching (1898–1986), botanist specialist of pteridophytes
- Qin Guang (秦光), fictional character in the 1990s Novel Series All under Heaven
