= List of Ji Gong episodes =

This is a list of Ji Gong episodes. Ji Gong series is directed by Zhang Ge, and starring You Benchang and Lü Liang as the "Mad Monk" Ji Gong, a popular Chinese folklore figure from the Southern Song dynasty. The series originally aired in 1 episode daily on Shanghai Television and Hangzhou Television in 1985.

== Episodes ==
No. in season	Title
1	"Birth of Ji Gong (济公出世)"
In the first Year of Period Shaoxing (1131) of the Southern Song dynasty (1127–1279), Li Shanren (李善人) is a kindhearted landlord in Tiantai County, Taizhou Prefecture, Zhejiang. He is already forty years old, but has no son. He is a devout Buddhist believer. He finally gets a son after devout worship. On the date of Ji Gong's birth, the abbot of Guoqing Temple names him "Xiuyuan" (修缘), he is deeply attached to Buddhism from then on. Xiuyuan and his friends witness businessman Zhou (周掌柜) and Witch Wang (王巫婆) worshiping Buddha and offering incenses and cursing the local villagers for getting sick. Xiuyuan and his friends play a trick on them. On his wedding day, Xiuyuan leaves without a warning and becomes a monk in Lingyin Temple with the Dharma name "Dao Ji" (道济). His parents become worried and fall ill. They send their nephew in search of the missing son. When Xiuyuan eventually returns home, his parents have already passed away. The housekeeper Lin (林管家) takes advantage of Xiuyuan's family property and schemes to send him to prison. Xiuyuan meets his fiancee Miss Lu (陆家姑娘) outside the tomb of his parents. She suffers from schizophrenia. Suddenly, lightning flashes and thunder rumbles, Xiuyuan disappears without a trace in torrential rain. Several years later, a mad monk appears in the streets, he punishes evil-doers and encourages people to do good. He helps those in danger and relieves those in need. Someone calls him "mad monk" and someone calls him "Ji Gong". A girl selling herself into servitude to pay for her father's burial mourning touches Ji Gong's heart. Ji Gong uses magic power to turn steamed bread into a golden tortoise, he sells it for 100 tael to a rich man, who has become lustful after seeing the girl. Ji Gong lights a branch with a candle and make it into a butterfly, when the butterfly flies into housekeeper Lin's house, it causes a big fire, and the house burns to ashes.
2	"Tears of Father and Daughter (阴阳泪水)"
When Ji Gong returns to Lingyin Temple, the director Guang Liang (广亮) insistes on refusing to take him in. Thanks to the abbot's mercy, he persuades Guang Liang. Ji Gong neither prays nor worships Buddha. He goes round the streets, drinks wine and eats meat, and he is always ready to defend the weak and helpness. Somebody calls him an incarnation of the devil, and somebody calls him a living Buddha. One day, Ji Gong meets a middle-aged man who is going to hang himself, Ji Gong saves him. He tells his story to Ji Gong: "My name is Dong Shihong (董士宏), I come from Qiantang County, I'm a teacher. Eighty years age, my parents died, I was so poor that I had to sell my daughter as a slavery in official Gu's (顾进士) family. For eight years, I collected money to come to Lin'an to ransom my daughter, but they have moved. I felt down and lost and walked on the streets, a thief robbed me of my baggage." Ji Gong takes him to dinner, after dinner, Ji Gong draws a circle on the ground and tells him not to leave the circle. Ji Gong knows his daughter is a slavery in minister councilor Luo Naiqing's (罗乃卿) home. Ji Gong goes alone to help him find his daughter. The day is the birthday of the old lady Luo (罗老夫人), Ji Gong follows officials to attend the old lady Luo's birthday party. The old lady Luo is blind, Ji Gong heals her eyes with magic power. The old lady Luo asks Ji Gong to cure her granddaughter. Ji Gong cures her granddaughter and helps to reunite Dong Shihong and his daughter.
3	"Transporting Wood through the Old Well (古井运木)"
Guang Liang, the elder brother of Ji Gong and director of Lingyin Temple, is a boring, strait-laced and narrow-minded monk. While Ji Gong is sleeping in the Dabei Hall (大悲楼), Guang Liang sets a fire to burn Ji Gong, but Ji Gong uses his pee to extinguish the fire. Guang Liang finds Ji Gong eating meat and drinking wine, he takes Ji Gong to meet the abbot, commands Ji Gong to collect alms money and wood to rebuild the Dabei Hall. Guang Liang promises that if Ji Gong gets the wood, he would kowtow to him three times, if Ji Gong couldn't gets the wood, he would evict Ji Gong from the temple. The deadline is three days. Su Beishan (苏北山), Zhou Bancheng (周半程) and Luo Naiqing (罗乃卿) donate the money to rebuild the Dabei Hall, they all benefited from Ji Gong. Ji Gong comes to Tianmu Mountain, where he intends to collect wood. Ji Gong hears from woodcutters that the mountains belongs to landlord Liu Caidong (刘财东), he comes to Liu's house and asks Liu for some wood. Ji Gong uses his coat for wrapping around a hill. In return, Ji Gong promises to give Liu a son in the next year. The time is up, the wood comes out of the Yuanzhao Well (圆照井) one after another. Guang Liang knows they now have too much wood to fit inside the temple, he orders Ji Gong to stop transporting wood. When Guang Liang counts the quantity, he realizes that they need a main beam. In order to punish Guang Liang, Ji Gong sends him to scrape the wood for half a day. Ji Gong uses his magic power to turn wood chips into a main beam.
4	"The Magic Cut (妙手移瘤)"
The old man who sells vegetables has no money for his wife's treatment, he borrows a loan from businessman Qian (钱老板). Qian's friend, businessman Bao defa (包得发), helps him figure out an idea, he could sells the old man's daughter to pay the debt. They come to the old man's booth, ask for payment of debt, the old man has no money and asks Qian to extend a time limit. Qian doesn't accept his explanation and requires him to cut off his tumor to pay for the debt. The old man's tumor has been on his chin for decades, and if he cuts it, he'll die. The old man disagrees and runs home with his daughter. Qian and Bao chase after them. When they open the door, they find Ji Gong already waiting for them at home. Ji Gong uses magic power to cut his tumor, but Qian says he doesn't want it, and he is scared and flees. The old man's daughter is holding the tumor to catch up. Because of nervous, Qian falls into a river from a bridge. Ji Gong uses magic power to transplant the tumor to Qian's chin. Ji Gong tells Qian that if he does good things, the tumor would shrink, and if he does bad things, the tumor would grow.
5	"Qiao Dian Zijinchai (巧点紫金钗)"
Li Wenlong (李文龙) is a poor and pedantic scholar, his family is so poor that they have no food to eat. When the couple worry about their livelihood, landlord Bu (卜大官人) sends a subordinate to invite Li to his home to write a couplet. Li accepts the invitation. At the same time, Li's wife comes to his brother's house to borrow rice. Her nephew is a kindhearted dumb, the boy gives her some rice and a chicken leg. Li finishes the couplet, Bu pays him 10 wen-money in return. Li feels that his couplet more than a little bit of money, so he tears the couplet, and goes back to home in a huff. Li meets Ji Gong at the gate of Bu's house, and Ji Gong fellows him to his home. Li stands in the doorway and hears a voice of a man and a woman from his house. Li thinks that his wife having an affair with other man. Li breaks into the door and the man and woman slip through the back door. Li picks up a love letter on the ground, and finds two bracelets and a gold hairpin in the box. Ji Gong lies to Li that he is Li's uncle. When Li's wife returns home, Li begins to has a quarrel as soon as they meet. Finally, Li writes a divorce paper to his wife and she leaves. At night, Ji Gong uses magic power to make a hairpin into a butterfly, Li follows the flying butterfly to Bu's house. Li stands at the door, hears Bu and his sister-in-law's conversation. Li knows that he falls into their trap. On the morning of the next day, Ji Gong and Li come to his sister-in-law's house. Li apologizes to his wife and throws the bracelets and gold hairpin on the ground. Li's nephew recognizes them at one glance and points his mother. Ji Gong cures his mute with magic power. The sister-in-law admits that all these bad things were schemed by her and Bu. At that time, Bu's wedding team comes to her home. Ji Gong dresses up as Li's wife and marries Bu. In the bedroom, Ji Gong shows his true features and beats Bu as punishment.
6	"Havoc in Prime Minister Qin's Mansion (大闹秦相府)"
The prime minister Qin (秦宰相) is a posterity of the Qin family, his ancestor Qin Hui was a traitor minister. Qin publicly robs wood of Lingyin Temple for the purpose of building Getian Pavilion (阁天楼). Gi Gong stops Qin's subordinates from robbing and beats them. Ji Gong is brings into the court. Qin tries all kinds of torture against Ji Gong, but Ji Gong pleads no guilty. Qin puts Ji Gong in prison. On the way, Ji Gong meets Qin's son Qin Huan (秦桓) capturing a girl. At night, Ji Gong escapes from the prison, and he goes to rescue the girl. Qin Huan intends to rape the girl, but Ji Gong saves her. Ji Gong walks back to the prison, he uses magic power to make Qin Huan's belly become bigger. Qin Huan is in a lot of pain. Qin asks the famous doctor Li Huaichun (李怀春) to treat his son. For the disease Li really lost his bearings and has no idea about what to do. Li recommends Ji Gong. Ji Gong talks about terms with Qin. Qin releases the monks of Linyin Temple and returns the wood. Ji Gong cures Qin Huan's disease. Qin gives a banquet as a token of thanks. Qin's wife, Madam Qin, poisons the wine and gives it to Ji Gong. When Ji Gong is ready to drink the poisonous wine, Madam Qin starts to feel a stabbing headache. Qin asks Ji Gong to treat his wife. Ji Gong pours the poisonous wine away. Ji Gong puts his hat on Madam Qin's head, and she doesn't feel the headache. By this time, Qin Huan's belly become bigger again, because he have do bad things again. Ji Gong gives them a prescription for a Buddhist scripture.
7	"Transplanting Leg in Drunk (醉接梅花腿)"
After the parinirvana of the abbot of Lingyin Temple, Guang Liang dislodges Ji Gong. Ji Gong is sheltered by Chan master Dehui (德辉长老) in Jingci Temple, and serves as its secretary monk. The Jingci Temple has become more and more deserted recently, Chan master Dehui asks Ji Gong to find out the reason. The landlord Zhao Tianpeng (赵天鹏) seizes the bridge which leads to Jingci Temple and collects tolls. Ji Gong donates money to help the pilgrims pass the bridge. Ji Gong burns the cashbox with magic power. Zhao Tianpeng stamps his feet on the fire. Zhao's leg gets stuck in the cashbox. When he finally manages to pull it out, his leg is stained with coppers and becomes a copper leg. Zhao catches Ji Gong and hangs him in a tree, but Ji Gong flees. Zhao returns home and he fells a sharp pain in his copper leg. Zhao asks a famous doctor Li Maochun (李茂春) to treat the disease. After the diagnoses, Li says he couldn't cure the disease, and he recommends Ji Gong. Ji Gong sleeps in the wine jar. Housekeeper Yao (姚管家) commands subordinates to carry it home. Ji Gong diagnoses Zhao's disease and thinks the best way to treat his disease is change a leg. Ji Gong picks Housekeeper Yao's leg for the transplant operation. Zhao and Yao gets drunk. Ji Gong transplants Yao's leg to Zhao and transplants a dog's leg to Yao, then he transplants a mud leg to the dog.
