= Jiya =

Jiya may refer to:

== People ==
=== Surname ===
- Ayanda Jiya (born 1987), South African singer and songwriter
- Edith Jiya (born 1972), Malawian businesswoman
- Tasa Jiya (born 1997), Dutch sprinter

=== Given name ===
- Jiya Shankar (born 1995), Indian actress
- Jiya Wright (born 2000), American football quarterback
- Mamman Jiya Vatsa (1940–1986), Nigerian general and poet

== Other ==
- Jiya (manga), a Japanese manga series by Akira Toriyama and Masakazu Katsura
- Jiya Township, a township in Xinjiang, China
- Jiya, a 2024 Indian Assamese-language film directed by Kenny Basumatary

== See also ==
- JIA (disambiguation)
- Jiah Khan (1988–2013), Indian film actress
