= Han Zheng =

Vice President of China since 2023

- 韩正
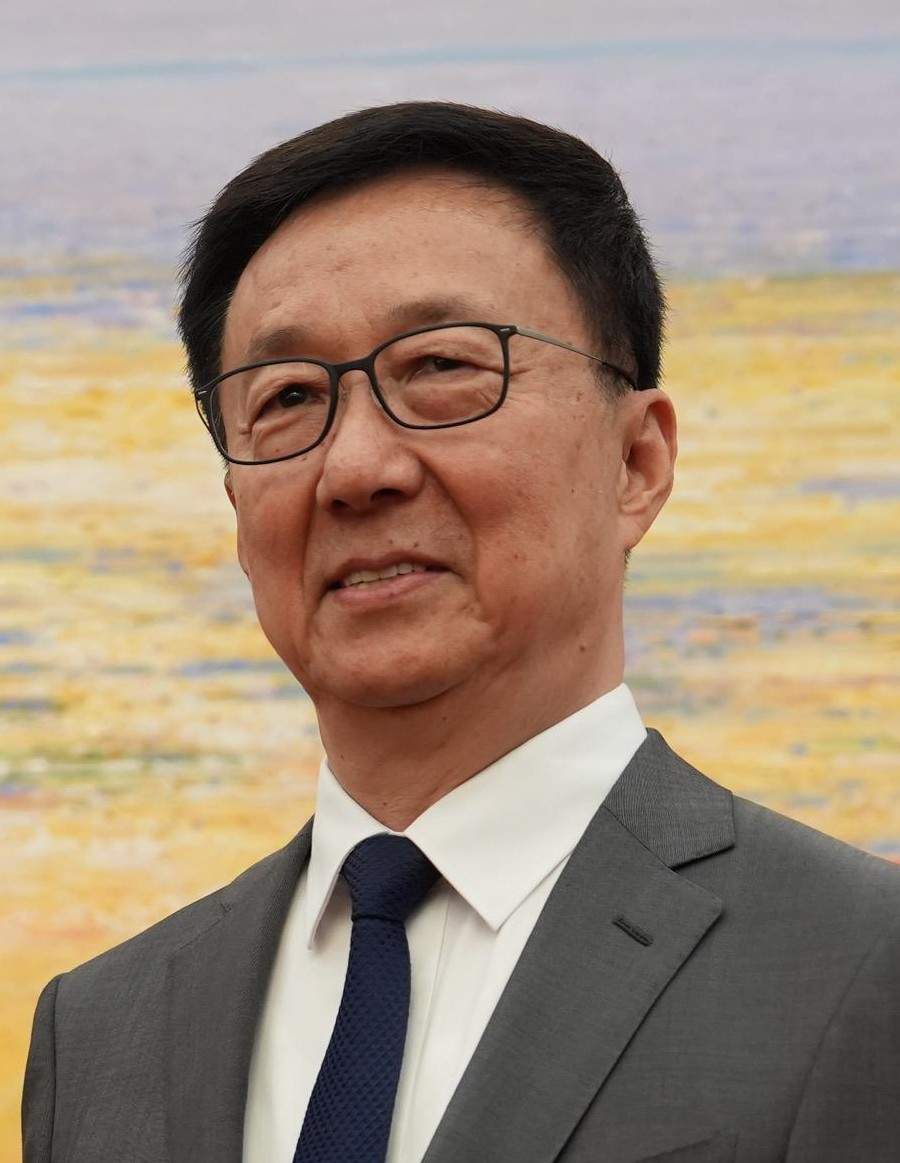
- Han in 2026

Vice President of China
- Incumbent
- Assumed office 10 March 2023
- President: Xi Jinping
- Preceded by: Wang Qishan

Vice Premier of China
- In office 19 March 2018 – 11 March 2023 Serving with Sun Chunlan, Hu Chunhua, Liu He
- Premier: Li Keqiang

Party Secretary of Shanghai
- In office 20 November 2012 – 29 October 2017
- General Secretary: Xi Jinping
- Mayor: Yang Xiong; Ying Yong
- Preceded by: Yu Zhengsheng
- Succeeded by: Li Qiang
- Acting; 24 September 2006 – 24 March 2007
- General Secretary: Hu Jintao
- Mayor: Himself
- Preceded by: Chen Liangyu
- Succeeded by: Xi Jinping

20th Mayor of Shanghai
- In office 24 March 2003 – 26 December 2012
- Party Secretary: Chen Liangyu; Himself (acting); Xi Jinping; Yu Zhengsheng; Himself
- Preceded by: Chen Liangyu
- Succeeded by: Yang Xiong

Personal details
- Born: April 1954 (age 72) Shanghai, China
- Party: Chinese Communist Party (1979–present)
- Spouse: Wan Ming (m. 1984)
- Children: One
- Education: East China Normal University; Fudan University
- Website: www.gov.cn/hanzheng

Chinese name
- Simplified Chinese: 韩正
- Traditional Chinese: 韓正
Transcriptions
Standard Mandarin
- Hanyu Pinyin: Hán Zhèng
- IPA: [xǎn ʈʂə̂ŋ]
- Leading Groups and Commissions: 2018–2023: Leader, Central Leading Group on Hong Kong and Macau Affairs; 2018–2023: Deputy Leader, Commission on Comprehensively Deepening Reforms

Han Zheng (Chinese: 韩正; pinyin: Hán Zhèng; born April 1954) is a Chinese politician who, since 2023, has served as the 11th vice president of China. He previously served as the first-ranking vice premier of China between 2018 and 2023, and as the seventh-ranking member of the Politburo Standing Committee of the Chinese Communist Party (CCP) between 2017 and 2022.

Han served as CCP deputy committee secretary and mayor of Shanghai between 2003 and 2012. In November 2012, he was promoted to become the CCP committee secretary of Shanghai, the top political post in the city, and also gained a seat on the CCP Politburo. In October 2017, he became a member of the 19th CCP Politburo Standing Committee, the top decision-making body in China, and in March 2018 became the first-ranked vice premier of China. During this tenure he served as the CCP's top leader in regard to Hong Kong and Macau affairs, presiding over the government's response to the 2019–2020 Hong Kong protests and the 2021 Hong Kong electoral changes.

Han retired from the Politburo Standing Committee, as well as the broader Central Committee after the 20th CCP National Congress in October 2022. At the 2023 National People's Congress in March 2023, Han was elected the vice president of China and a deputy to the 14th National People's Congress. Regarded as "number eight" in seniority of the leadership of China and a close adviser to CCP general secretary and Chinese president Xi Jinping, Han's ceremonial role in the state government has focused on foreign affairs and diplomacy. He has served as Xi's special representative at events such as the coronation of Charles III and Camilla in 2023 and the second inauguration of Donald Trump in 2025.

== Early career ==
He was born in Shanghai in April 1954, but traces his ancestry to Cixi, in neighboring Zhejiang province. He was a sent-down youth during the Cultural Revolution, working at a collective farm in Chongming County, Shanghai. He later worked at a warehouse of a lifting installation company, later working at the company's supply and marketing division. He additionally served as a deputy secretary of the Communist Youth League of China (CYLC) between 1975 and 1980. He joined the Chinese Communist Party in 1979.

He then worked at the Shanghai Chemical Equipment Industry company in an administrative role between 1980 and 1982. He was the secretary of the CYLC committee at the Chemical Industry Bureau of the Shanghai Municipal People's Government between 1982 and 1986, and the deputy CCP secretary of the Shanghai School of Chemical Engineering between 1986 and 1987. He worked as the CCP secretary and deputy director of the Shanghai No. 6 Rubber Shoes Factory between 1987 and 1988; during this time, he was praised by then Shanghai mayor Zhu Rongji.

He was the CCP secretary and deputy director of the Dazhonghua Rubber Plant between 1988 and 1990. Between 1983 and 1985, he additionally attended a two-year college program in Fudan University, and later completed an undergraduate degree in politics at the East China Normal University between 1985 and 1987 through part-time studies.

In June 1990, Han officially entered the CYLC Shanghai Committee, and would rise to become its deputy secretary in charge of day-to-day work, then elevated to secretary in 1991. In November 1992 he was named governor and deputy CCP secretary of Luwan District. During his tenure in the district, Han spearheaded the Huaihai Road revitalization initiative, transforming the street to a glamorous shopping destination. Han also focused on fixing the ecology of the district and expanding its green spaces. He then obtained a master's degree in international political economy from East China Normal University between 1991 and 1994 and earned the title of senior economist.

== Career in Shanghai ==
In July 1995, Han was named deputy secretary-general of the Shanghai Municipal People's Government, during which he was made the deputy CCP secretary of the Municipal Comprehensive Economic Work Committee, the director of the City Planning Commission, and the director of the Securities Management Office. In December 1997, he was named a member of the municipal CCP Standing Committee for the first time, entering sub-provincial ranks. In February 1998 he was named vice mayor of Shanghai; in May 2002 he was named Deputy CCP Secretary of Shanghai. Han joined the Central Committee of the Chinese Communist Party at the 16th Party Congress in 2002. In 2003 he was named the Mayor of Shanghai.

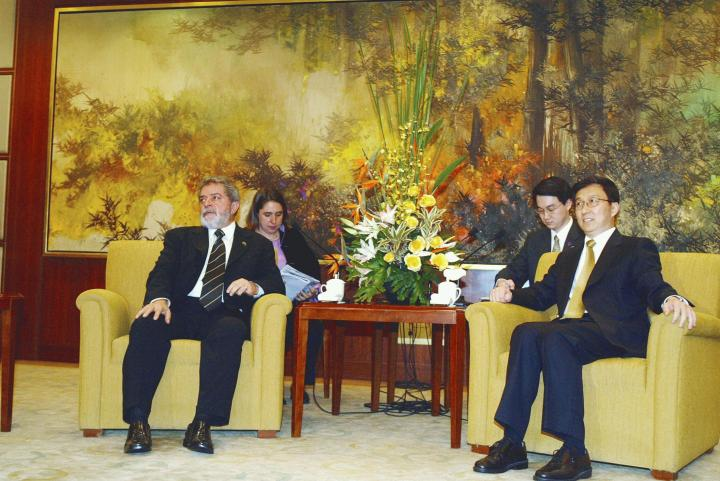
Han with the President of Brazil, Lula da Silva in 2004

In 2006, Han became the acting CCP Committee Secretary of Shanghai after the dismissal of Chen Liangyu over corruption probes during the Shanghai pension scandal. His tenure as the interim party secretary in Shanghai lasted a five months, when on 24 March 2007, Xi Jinping was elected Shanghai Party Secretary from the same post in the neighboring province of Zhejiang. After serving as aide to Xi, Xi became a member of CCP Politburo Standing Committee in October 2007, and became vice president in 2008.

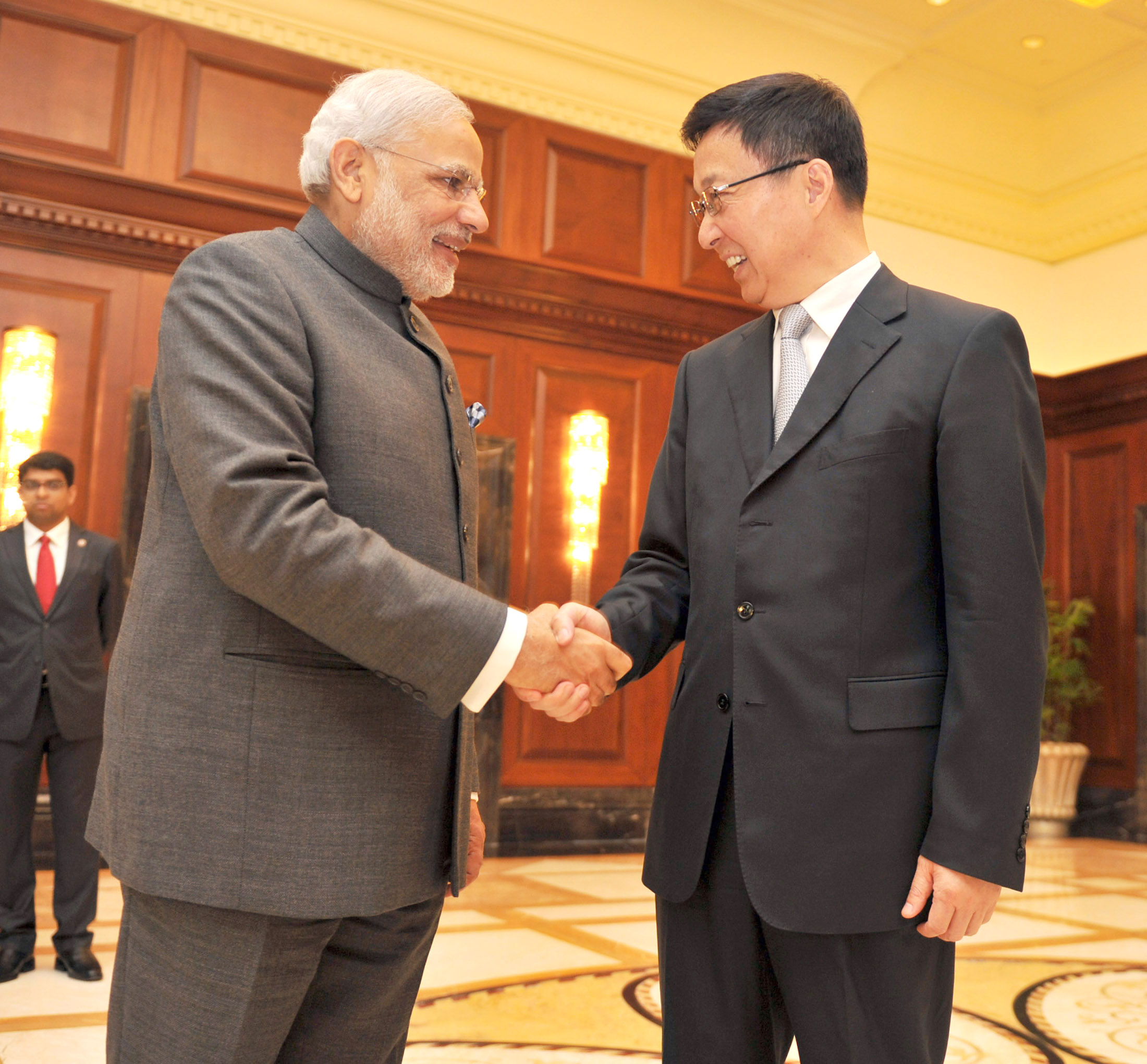
Han with the Prime Minister of India, Narendra Modi in 2015

Yu Zhengsheng succeeded Xi as Shanghai Party Secretary, and Han worked for him for the next five years. By 2008 Han was expected to step back from leadership as fallout from Chen's scandal, though Yu encouraged the relevant authorities in Beijing to keep Han on. Han assumed the party secretary post in November 2012, shortly after the conclusion of the 18th CCP National Congress, and also gained a seat on the 18th Politburo of the Chinese Communist Party. Due to his long career in Shanghai, Han is considered to be a member of the Shanghai clique.

== Vice Premier ==
Han was chosen to be a member of the 19th CCP Politburo Standing Committee, China's top decision-making body, at the first plenary session of the 19th Central Committee of the Chinese Communist Party on 25 October 2017. In March 2018 the National People's Congress appointed him as the first-ranked vice premier of the State Council in Li Keqiang Government.

=== Hong Kong ===
Han succeeded Zhang Dejiang as the leader of the Central Coordination Group for Hong Kong and Macau Affairs in April 2018, making him the CCP's top leader in regards to Hong Kong and Macau affairs. The Central Coordination Group was later upgraded to a Central Leading Group in 2020.

Han was a key figure in the Chinese leadership's response during the 2019–2020 Hong Kong protests. According to a Reuters report in 2019, shortly after the storming of the Legislative Council Complex, Han Zheng authorized Hong Kong chief executive Carrie Lam to directly communicate with his office, rather than go through the Hong Kong Liaison Office. It also reported that Han summoned Lam to the Bauhinia Villa, used by the Chinese government for talks with Hong Kong officials, on 12 June. There, Lam proposed the suspension of the extradition bill which triggered the protests, which Han then agreed to after talking to other leaders in China.

In March 2021, Han said that electoral reforms in Hong Kong, designed to reduce the power of district councillors and to increase the power of the election committee, were being implemented to "prevent subversion."

== Vice President ==
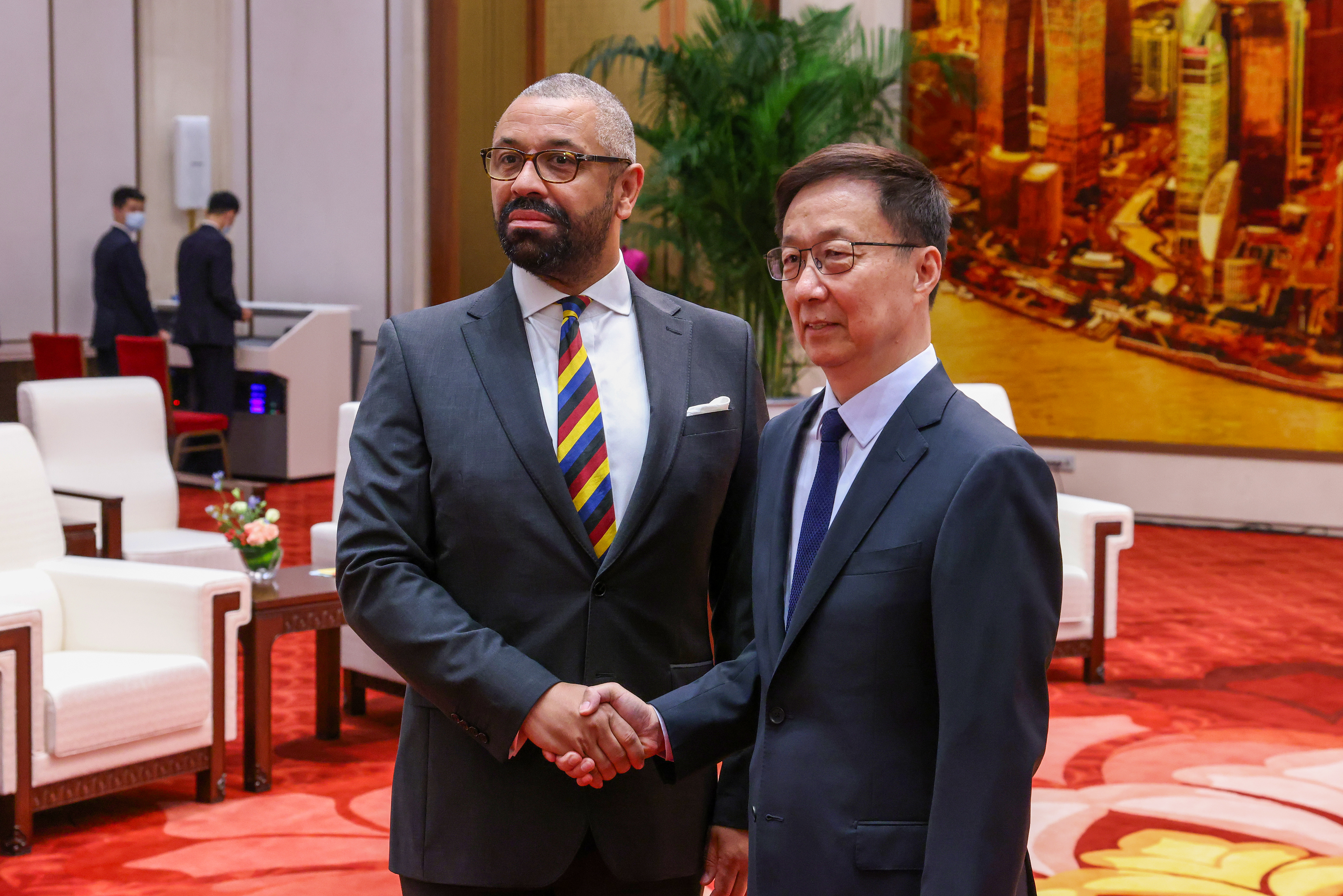
Han with British foreign secretary James Cleverly in 2023

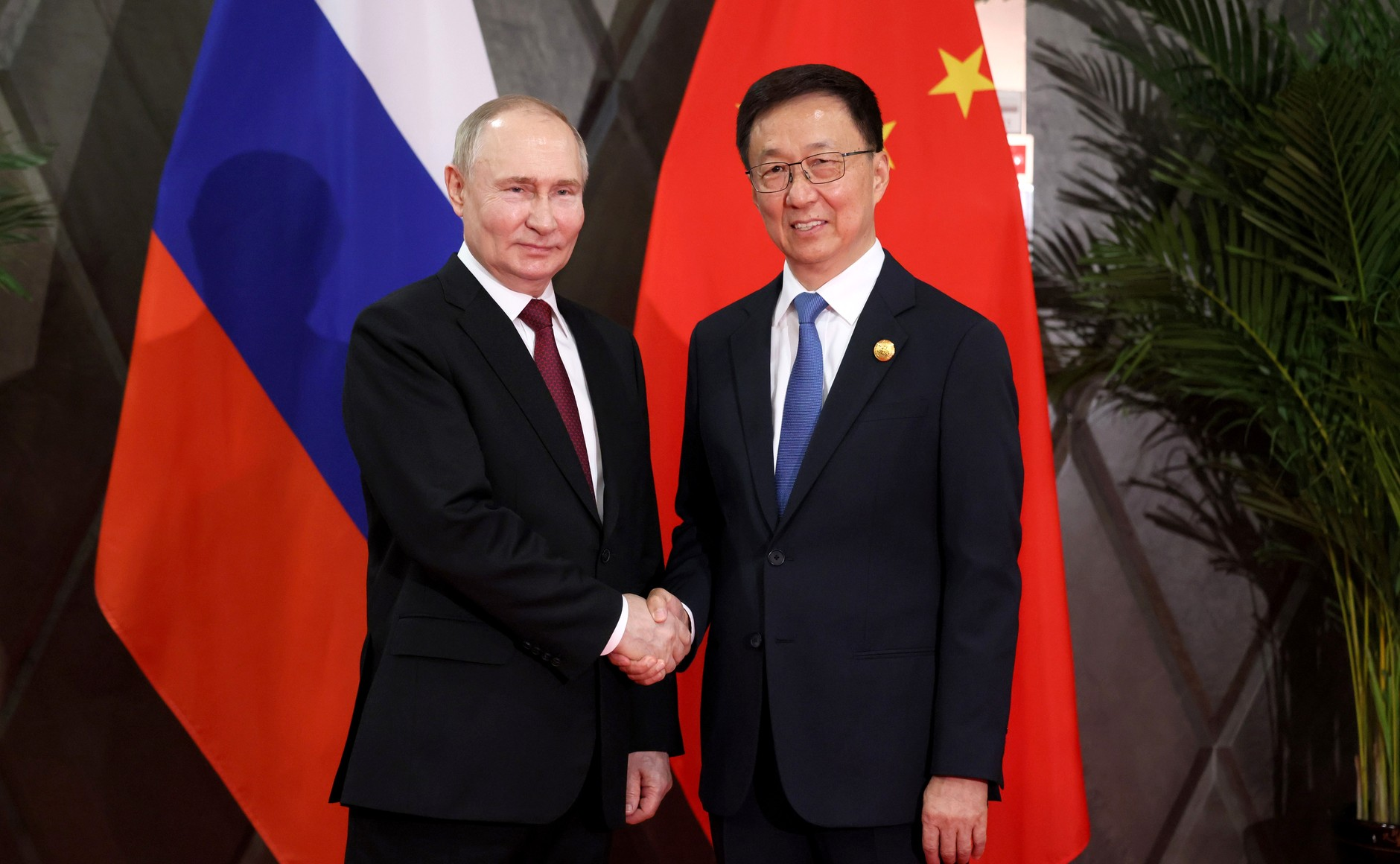
Han Zheng with Russian President Vladimir Putin in Beijing during Putin's visit to China in May 2024

After the 20th CCP National Congress in October 2022, Han Zheng retired from the Politburo Standing Committee, as well as the broader Central Committee, at the age of 67. He was subsequently elected as a deputy to the 14th National People's Congress (NPC), the only departing PSC member to do so. On 10 March 2023, Han was elected during the first session of the 14th NPC as the vice president of China, succeeding Wang Qishan. As vice president, Han is known as "number eight" in seniority of the leadership of China, after the seven-member Politburo Standing Committee while his role in the government remains ceremonial and concerns serving as an envoy for, and close adviser to, Xi Jinping.

As vice president, Han has taken part in diplomatic activities. Han was CCP general secretary and president Xi Jinping's special representative at the coronation of Charles III and Camilla in May 2023. In August, Han met with British foreign secretary James Cleverly in Beijing. He additionally attended the general debate of the seventy-eighth session of the United Nations General Assembly, giving a speech on 21 September. Han also met with US secretary of state Antony Blinken on the sidelines of the UN General Assembly that month. In October, Han attended the inauguration of Prabowo Subianto as the eighth president of Indonesia.

In May 2024, Han met with Russian president Vladimir Putin in Harbin, where both Han and Putin attended the opening ceremony of 8th China-Russia expo. On 10 October, he succeeded Wang Qishan as the honorary president of the Red Cross Society of China. He attended the second inauguration of Donald Trump on 20 January 2025 as President Xi's special representative. Han's attendance marks the first time a senior official of China's government has been sent to a US presidential inauguration. Han's presence at the event, as he is a trusted senior official, was seen by commentators as representative of Xi's interest in strengthening China–United States relations. Han attended separate meetings with incoming US vice president JD Vance and Trump ally Elon Musk before the inauguration, where Han and each of the two reaffirmed this directive to promote agreement and stable relations between their respective countries. Han attended the general debate of the eighty-first session of the United Nations General Assembly, giving a speech on 26 September 2026.

== Family ==
Han Zheng is married to Wang Ming, who reportedly once served as a vice chair of the Shanghai Charity Foundation. They have one daughter.

Political offices
Preceded by Wang Qishan	Vice President of China; 2023–present	Incumbent
Preceded by Zhang Gaoli	First-ranked Vice Premier of China; 2018–2023	Succeeded by Ding Xuexiang
Preceded by Chen Liangyu	Mayor of Shanghai; 2003–2012	Succeeded by Yang Xiong
Party political offices
Preceded by Yu Zhengsheng	Party Secretary of Shanghai; 2012–2017	Succeeded by Li Qiang
Preceded by Chen Liangyu	Party Secretary of Shanghai (Acting); 2006–2007	Succeeded by Xi Jinping
Order of precedence
Preceded by Li Xi as Member of the Politburo Standing Committee of the Chinese Communist Party	Order of precedence of China as Vice President	Succeeded by Huang Kunming as Member of the Politburo of the Chinese Communist Party
