= Zhu Junyi =

Chinese bureaucrat and financial criminal (born 1951)

Zhu Junyi (Chinese: 祝均一; born February 1951 in Haining, Zhejiang) was a government official in Shanghai, China. Prior to his arrest during an investigation into corruption in Shanghai in 2006, he had been in charge of the Shanghai Municipal Bureau of Labour and Social Security, Shanghai's municipal pension system.

== Biography ==
Zhu attended the Changle Road 3rd Elementary School and Xiangli Middle School. In 1966, on leaving middle school, he joined the army in Xunke county, Heilongjiang province. He returned to Shanghai in 1976, and joined the Huaihai Road production corps, rising rapidly through the ranks. The corps was renamed Shanghai Luwan District Spring Thunder Telecommunication factory.

In 1983, when the factory performance made news in Shanghai by making a record profit of 1.4 million Yuan, he was declared a model labourer, and "Commando of the New Long March". In 1985, Zhu became Assistant Commissioner of the Collective Enterprise Administrative Bureau in Luwan District of Shanghai. In 1989, Zhu was promoted to Assistant Commissioner of the Collective Enterprise Administrative Bureau of Shanghai.

In 1996, Zhu was made Assistant Director of the Shanghai Economics Committee. In 1998, he became head of the Shanghai Municipal Bureau of Labour and Social Security. He was removed from his post amidst allegations of bribery, corruption, and misappropriation of funds.

== Corruption allegations ==
He allegedly took bribes and was accused of having illegally loaned some 3.2 billion Yuan from the Shanghai Social Security Fund to Fuxi Investment Holding Co., a company owned by businessman and fellow Chinese People's Political Consultative Conference (CPPCC) member Zhang Rongkun.

Zhu is also implicated in the embezzlement of 16 billion Yuan from the fund between 1998 and 2006. He appears also to have obtained 50 million yuan for Qiu Xiaohua (邱晓华), the former director of China's National Bureau of Statistics, which was intended for Qiu's long-time lover. Zhu and Qiu knew one another through Zhang Rongkun.

== See also ==
- Shanghai clique
- Qin Yu
- Chen Liangyu
