= Jia (name) =

Jia is the pinyin romanization of multiple Chinese given names, which are not all homophonous. Chia is the corresponding Wade-Giles romanization that is used Taiwan. Ka is the Cantonese-based romanization used in Hong Kong, Macao and other areas of Southeastern China.

== Notable people with Jia as a given name ==
=== Historical figures ===
- Jia of Wei (魏王假) (died 225 BC?), the last ruler of Wei during the Warring States Period
- Jia of Zhao (赵王嘉) (reigned 227–223 BCE), the last ruler of Zhao during the Warring States Period
- Wang Jia (王嘉) was a Chinese Taoist hermit and scholar.
- Qin Jia (c. first century B.C. – first century A.D.) (秦嘉) was a Chinese poet of the Eastern Han dynasty.

=== Politics ===
- Li Jia (born 1961) (李佳) male Chinese politician, Deputy Communist Party Secretary of Inner Mongolia
- Li Jia (born 1964) (李嘉) male Chinese politician, former Communist Party Secretary of Zhuhai
- Li Jia (born 1966) (李佳) female Chinese politician, former Party Secretary of Ziyang, Sichuan
- Hu Jia (activist) (born 1973) (胡佳) Chinese pro-democracy and HIV/AIDS activist

=== Sports ===
- Li Jia (table tennis) (李佳) (born 1981), female table tennis player, peak of career from 2000 to 2003
- Liu Jia (刘佳) (born 1982), is a female Chinese-born table tennis player who now represents Austria.
- Hu Jia (diver) (胡佳) (born 1983), Chinese Olympic diver
- Qi Jia (齐佳) is a female Chinese ice dancer.
- Tian Jia (田佳), female Chinese professional beach volleyball player.
- Pan Jia (潘佳), Chinese footballer.

=== Cinema ===
- Li Jia (李柯竺), Chinese actress who appeared in The Park (2007 film)
- Liu Jia (Chinese: 刘佳; born 1982) is a female Chinese-born table tennis player who now represents Austria.
- Song Jia (actress, born 1962) (宋佳), Chinese actress
- Song Jia (actress, born 1980) (宋佳), Chinese actress and singer
- Jia Lissa, Russian actress

=== Other ===
- Meng Jia (孟佳) (born 1989), Chinese singer mostly active in South Korea and China.
- Jia Tolentino (born 1988), American staff writer for The New Yorker

== See also ==
- Jia Jing (Sprite), a Marvel Comics character
