= Zhang Rongkun =

Zhang Rongkun (simplified Chinese: 张荣坤; traditional Chinese: 張榮坤; pinyin: Zhāng Róngkūn; born 1973 in Suzhou, Jiangsu) is one of the richest men in China; he was listed as China's 16th richest man on Forbes's 2005 list of the richest people in China. Zhang was a member of the Chinese People's Political Consultative Conference and is currently the chairman of Fuxi Investment Holding Company and is a major shareholder in Shanghai Electric Group. He was a member of the board of directors on Shanghai Electric Group until his resignation in August 2006. In 2008 Zhang was convicted of giving government employees $4.1 million in bribes and was sentenced to 19 years in prison.

== See also ==
- Chen Liangyu
- Huang Ju
- Qin Yu
- Zhu Junyi
