= Xu Kuangdi =

Chinese politician and scientist

Xu Kuangdi KmstkNO FREng
- 徐匡迪
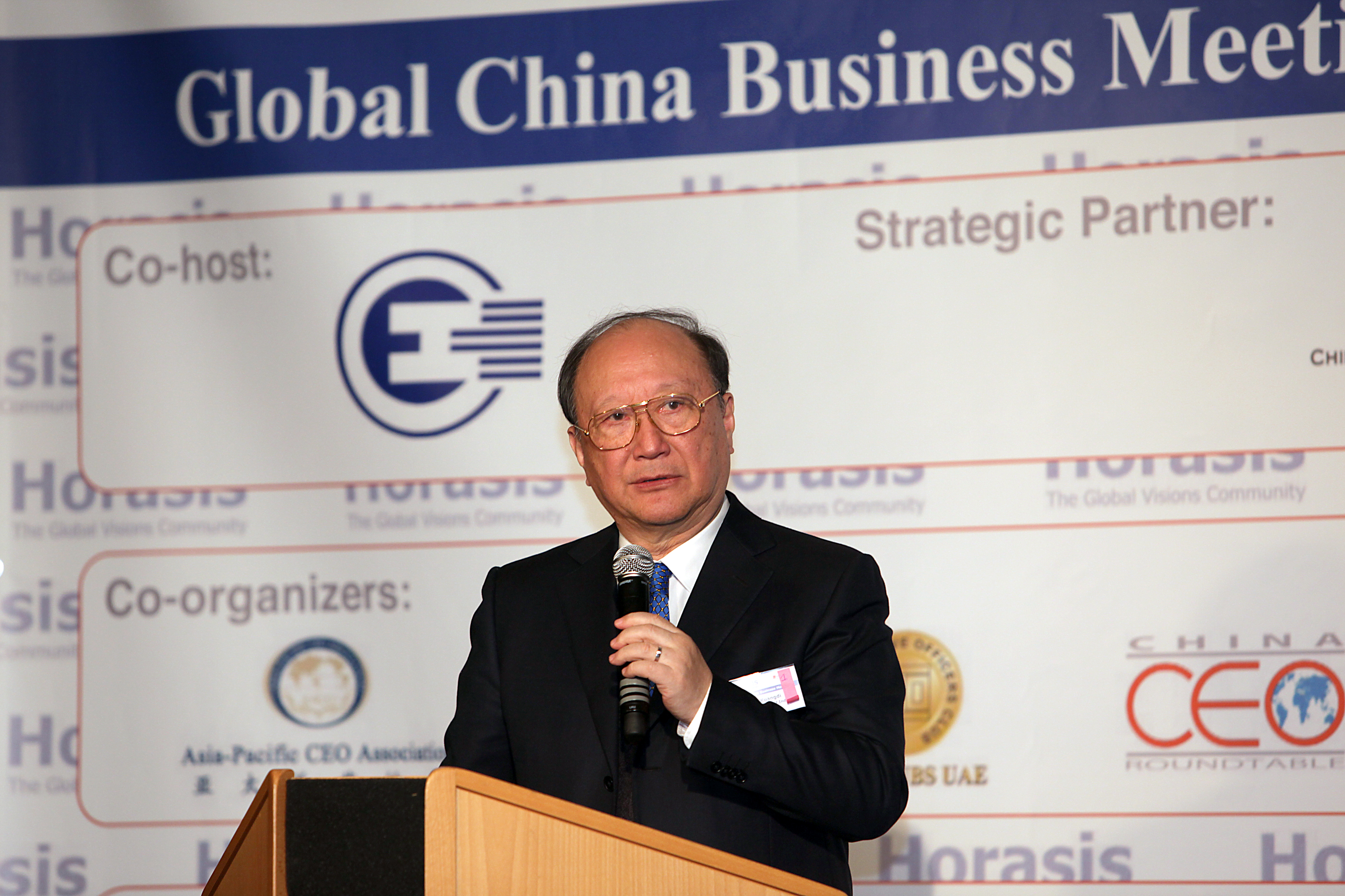
- Xu in 2010

Mayor of Shanghai
- In office February 1995 – December 2001
- Preceded by: Huang Ju
- Succeeded by: Chen Liangyu

Personal details
- Born: December 1936 (age 89) Tongxiang, Zhejiang, China
- Party: Chinese Communist Party

Xu Kuangdi (Chinese: 徐匡迪; pinyin: Xú Kuāngdí; born December 1936) is a Chinese politician and scientist, best known for his term as Mayor of Shanghai from 1995 to 2001. He supervised the transformation of Shanghai during his administration into a center for international investment and trade that helped lead the intensive development of China's economy. Between 2003 and 2008, Xu served as Vice-Chairman of the Chinese People's Political Consultative Conference.

== Biography ==
Xu was born in Tongxiang, Zhejiang province, near Shanghai. He graduated from Hangzhou High School. He graduated from the Beijing Institute of Iron and Steel Engineering in 1959, during the midst of the Great Leap Forward, and was a professor there from 1959 to 1963, then at the Shanghai Institute of Engineering from 1963 to 1971, through the height of the Cultural Revolution. He did not join the Chinese Communist Party until 1983. He studied in Britain in 1982 and 1983 and worked in Sweden from 1984 to 1985; he also won a national award for his design of a stainless steel pipe for use in aircraft production.

He held a number of other academic positions through 1991, when Zhu appointed him as director of the Shanghai Municipal Planning Commission, allegedly because he had remarked that he hated central planning.

Xu was Mayor of Shanghai from 1995-2001. During his tenure, Shanghai's Pudong New Area developed rapidly.

However, Xu was demoted in 2001, to a far more obscure position as party chief of the Academy of Engineering in Beijing, apparently as the result of an internal party power struggles. Xu was replaced by Executive Vice-Mayor Chen Liangyu, one of Jiang's associates who was later convicted on charges of corruption.

From 2003 to 2008 Xu was a Vice-Chairman of the Chinese People's Political Consultative Conference. He is a professor and doctoral supervisor at Shanghai University.

He retired on June 11, 2010 from his post as the Party Chief and President of the Chinese Academy of Engineering.

In 2014, he was appointed to lead the advisory panel for the coordinated development of the Beijing-Tianjin-Hebei region. Xu is Xi Xinping's lead advisor on the development of Xiong'an, as of at least 2023.

Xu was an alternate member of the 14th Central Committee of the Chinese Communist Party and a full member of the 15th and 16th Central Committees.

== Honours ==
In 2004 Xu was elected as an International Fellow of the UK Royal Academy of Engineering.

On June 28, 2011, Xu received an honorary Doctor of Engineering degree from the City University of Hong Kong.

Government offices
Preceded by Huang Ju	Mayor of Shanghai; 1995–2001	Succeeded by Chen Liangyu
