= This Song (disambiguation) =

This Song may refer to:

- "This Song", a song by George Harrison from Thirty Three & ⅓
- "This Song", a song by Badly Drawn Boy from The Hour of Bewilderbeast
- "This Song", a song by Ballin' Jack from Special Pride
- "This Song", a song by Cassius from 15 Again
- "This Song", a song by Conan Gray from Wishbone
- "This Song", a song by Daniel Johnston from Retired Boxer
- "This Song", a song by Evelyn "Champagne" King from The Girl Next Door
- "This Song", a song by Grizzly Bear from Horn of Plenty
- "This Song", a song by Marty Robbins from It's a Sin
- "This Song", a song by McFly from Above the Noise
- "This Song", a song by Meat Puppets from Rise to Your Knees
- "This Song", a song by Polyrock from Polyrock
- "This Song", a song by Quarashi from Guerilla Disco
- "This Song", a song by RAC from Ego
- "This Song", a song by Ron Sexsmith from Blue Boy
- "This Song", a song by The Enemy from We'll Live and Die in These Towns
- "This Song", a song by The Stranglers from Dark Matters
- "This Song", a song by T-Square / The Square from Midnight Lover
- "This Song", a song by Those Darn Accordions from Squeeze Machine
- "This Song (Has Probably Been Played Before)", a song by Spring Heeled Jack from Static World View
- "This Song: For the True and Passionate Lovers of Music", a song by Shai Hulud from That Within Blood Ill-Tempered

== See also ==
- Song (disambiguation)
