= Huang Ju =

Chinese politician (1938–2007)

- 黄菊
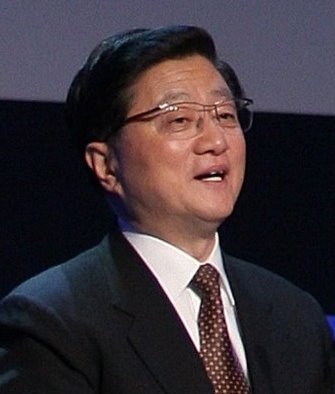
- Huang Ju in 2005

Vice Premier of China
- In office 17 March 2003 – 2 June 2007
- Premier: Wen Jiabao

Party Secretary of Shanghai
- In office 28 September 1994 – 22 October 2002
- Deputy: Xu Kuangdi (mayor)
- Preceded by: Wu Bangguo
- Succeeded by: Chen Liangyu

Mayor of Shanghai
- In office 29 April 1991 – 24 February 1994
- Leader: Wu Bangguo (party secretary)
- Preceded by: Zhu Rongji
- Succeeded by: Xu Kuangdi

Personal details
- Born: 28 September 1938 Shanghai French Concession, (modern-day Shanghai, China)
- Died: 2 June 2007 (aged 68) Beijing, China
- Party: Chinese Communist Party (1966–2007)
- Spouse: Yu Huiwen
- Children: 1 son, 1 daughter
- Education: Tsinghua University
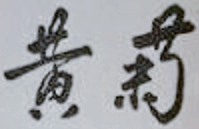
- Signature

Huang Ju
- Traditional Chinese: 黃菊
- Simplified Chinese: 黄菊
Transcriptions
Standard Mandarin
- Hanyu Pinyin: Huáng Jú

Huang Ju (28 September 1938 – 2 June 2007) was a Chinese politician and a high-ranking leader in the Chinese Communist Party (CCP). He was one of the nine members of the Politburo Standing Committee of the CCP, China's top decision-making body, between 2002 until his death in 2007, and also served as the first-ranked vice premier of China beginning in 2003. He died in office before he could complete his terms on the Standing Committee and as vice premier.

An electrical engineer by trade, Huang was a close confidante of party leader Jiang Zemin, to whom he owed his rise to power. He served as mayor of Shanghai between 1991 and 1994, then Communist Party secretary of the metropolis between 1994 and 2002. Huang's career in Shanghai and his family's alleged involvement in several corruption cases in the city generated controversy. After 2002, Huang emerged as one of the least popular and most partisan members of China's top leadership, and was named by observers as a "core member" of the Shanghai clique.

== Early life and career ==
Huang was born in Shanghai and he was the second of five children in the family. Huang spent a long time in Zhejiang when he was young. From 1944 to 1950, he studied at Zhejiang Jiashan Yishan Primary School (浙江嘉善益善小学) and Qidong Primary School (启东小学). He attended Jiashan No.2 Middle School (嘉善二中) and Jiaxing No.1 Middle School (嘉兴一中) for high school from 1950 to 1956. He attended Tsinghua University between 1956 and 1963 where he graduated in Electrical Engineering. In 1966, he joined the Chinese Communist Party.

Huang was employed as a technician in the foundry section of the Shanghai Artificial-board Machinery Factory (上海人造板机器厂) from 1963 to 1967. From 1967 to 1977, Huang worked as Technician in the power section of the Shanghai Zhonghua Metallurgical Factory (上海中华冶金厂), where he also served as deputy lead of the production party group. He became deputy director of the Revolutionary Committee (during the Cultural Revolution, the highest day-to-day authority), Deputy Plant Manager, while working as an engineer, from 1977 to 1980. He was Assistant Manager of the Shanghai Petrochemical General Machinery Company (上海市石化通用机械制造公司) from 1980 to 1982. From 1982 to 1983 he was Deputy Commissioner of the Shanghai First Mechanical and Electrical Industry Bureau (上海市第一机电工业局).

== Shanghai politics ==
From 1983 to 1984, Huang Ju served as a standing member of the Shanghai Municipal Party Committee and secretary of the industry affairs committee; he was the Shanghai Party Committee's secretary General from 1984 to 1985 and deputy party chief in charge of propaganda from 1985 to 1986.

In 1987, Huang was named as a candidate for the mayor of Shanghai, but received too few votes supporting his candidacy by the municipal People's Congress. Zhu Rongji was subsequently elected mayor instead. When Zhu ascended to Beijing to become Vice Premier and governor of China's central bank, Huang became mayor of Shanghai in 1991 and then the city's party chief in 1994 after Wu Bangguo became Vice Premier. Huang served as Party secretary of Shanghai until October 2002. In September 1994 he entered the Politburo of the Chinese Communist Party at the 4th Plenum of the 14th Central Committee.

Huang's rise in Shanghai politics was largely credited to the patronage of Jiang Zemin, who served as the Party Committee secretary in Shanghai until the latter's sudden appointment to become general secretary of the Communist Party following the 1989 Tiananmen Square protests and massacre. Huang was seen as one of Jiang's most trusted confidantes in Shanghai, and Jiang's elevation to become the party's top leader paved the way Huang to climb higher on the party's career ladder. Huang was said to be so thankful of Jiang's patronage that while on a working visit to New York during his term of Shanghai mayor, Huang and his entourage, immediately after leaving the airport, proceeded first thing to wine-and-dine Jiang's son Jiang Mianheng.

During Huang's term of party chief of Shanghai, he kept the city's party organization in line, and is remembered by some as having raised the income of Shanghai residents. The Pudong New Area also saw explosive growth under Huang. While Shanghai's economic growth continued during Huang Ju's time as the city's leader, most observers credit Shanghai's success to the work of Zhu Rongji and Xu Kuangdi. Among the mayors of Shanghai in the late 20th century, Huang was the least popular. During his term as Shanghai party chief, Huang often criticized mayor Xu Kuangdi, and opposed Xu's holding higher office. Because Xu was a popular figure in Shanghai, Huang's open suppression of Xu damaged his reputation among ordinary residents. In Shanghai political circles, Huang earned a reputation as being extremely adept at crafting relationships with his superiors. However, both Huang's successor Chen Liangyu and Jiang Zemin evaluated Huang's term in Shanghai with gushing praise, stating that Huang was instrumental in contributing to Shanghai's economic growth.

=== Controversies ===
In May 1994, after Huang's installation as the Shanghai party chief, his wife Yu Huiwen, along with Shanghai official Chen Tiedi began a charity organization allegedly for money laundering for Huang's wife and close colleagues, who received "donations" from the business elite. Although some of this money did indeed go to charity, there was a large amount of funds unaccounted for. It was unclear what Huang's involvement was in this process, but it was clear that his power in Shanghai gave license to his family.

Huang was also believed to be implicated in the Shanghai real estate scandals involving Zhou Zhengyi, one of Shanghai's business elite. Huang did little to curb monopolies in Shanghai's booming real estate sector. Public protests resulted from residents being evicted from their homes (with little or no compensation) to make way for new construction. Zhou was eventually charged with multiple counts of fraud, but only sentenced to three years in prison, which analysts speculated was due to Huang exerting his influence on the municipal courts. In addition, Huang's wife, Yu Huiwen, controlled the Shanghai pension fund, and was linked to Zhang Rongkun, who was at the centre of allegations of misappropriation of the fund's money. Huang's brother, who was made a high-ranking executive of a Pudong development firm, also moved funds for personal use.

== Ascension to Beijing ==
Huang's patron, general secretary Jiang Zemin, was due to leave his party leadership post in 2002, handing the reins of power to a new generation of leaders led by Hu Jintao. In the lead-up to the 16th Party Congress held in the autumn of 2002, Jiang worked to promote some of his former associates in Shanghai to the Politburo Standing Committee, the de facto top decision-making body of the country. Initially Huang was said to have been offered to replace Ding Guangen to take over the central Publicity Department, but Huang declined. Jiang also reportedly proposed that Huang lead the Chinese People's Political Consultative Conference, which entailed a seat on the Standing Committee. Eventually, it was settled that Huang would earn a seat on the Standing Committee as first-ranking vice premier assisting Wen Jiabao, replacing outgoing vice premier Li Lanqing.

Huang's appointment was controversial, not only because of his poor reputation in Shanghai, but also because he was seen as highly partisan, and that he was tapped for promotion solely due to his coziness with Jiang and not as a result of tangible achievements. Zhu Rongji, then the outgoing premier and who had worked with Huang in Shanghai, was reportedly opposed to Huang's elevation. Back in 1997, Huang's election to the 15th Central Committee received only 1,455 votes in favour, out of 2,074 votes cast, and some 300 votes against, unusually low in Chinese national politics. This meant that nearly one third of party delegates did not even approve of Huang's central committee membership. In 2002, of the full members of the Central Committee, Huang again received the lowest number of votes of anyone elected, meaning there was a real possibility that Huang would not have entered the Standing Committee at all, since Standing Committee members must be selected from the Central Committee.

Nevertheless, on 15 November 2002, Huang was officially named a member of the 9-man Politburo Standing Committee, joining other Jiang associates such as Jia Qinglin, Zeng Qinghong, and Li Changchun on the supreme body. In March 2003, he was confirmed by the National People's Congress as vice premier of the State Council, ranking first.

His position as first vice premier was considered a figurehead role with little power, especially when compared to previous first vice premiers Yao Yilin, Zhu Rongji and Li Lanqing. His official portfolios were to oversee finance and banking. Huang served as a member of the Leading Group for Financial and Economic Affairs.

Huang's political fate seemed to hang in the balance when his close former colleague Chen Liangyu was removed from the Politburo and put under investigation for corruption as part of the Shanghai pension scandal in 2006. By this time, Huang was already ill and cut back on public appearances. There was speculation that Huang would be implicated in the scandal.

== Illness ==
In February 2006, the South China Morning Post reported that Huang was seriously ill, and was expected to step down. Although some government officials said he had pancreatic cancer, the party did not, at the time, disclose the nature of his condition. On 17 March, sources reported he was near death. Huang attended a Science and Technology forum in Beijing on 5 June, temporarily reducing speculation that he was soon going to die.

After giving a keynote speech at the State-Owned Enterprise (SOE) executives' conference on 5 January 2007, he was notably absent at the Central Conference on Financial Affairs later on that month. Huang offered his condolences to late party elder Bo Yibo when Bo died, but did not attend the funeral as would have been expected of a Standing Committee member. Huang's absence prompted speculation that his critical condition was preventing him from carrying out his official duties. Hong Kong media speculated that Huang was undergoing medical treatment in Shanghai. Huang appeared, looking frail, during the National People's Congress in March 2007. The government denied Huang's request to resign effective March 2007, but thereafter his position became entirely ceremonial. He handed over his role of oversight of the Financial Affairs portfolio to premier Wen Jiabao in January. Huang disappeared from public view in March 2007. Huang left Shanghai in April and was admitted to the 301 Military Hospital in Beijing, after which his health situation deteriorated.

Some media sources reported Huang's death as early as May, though the initial reports turned out to be false. To reduce speculation, by 9 May, the authorities closed off the south-west wing of the 301 Military Hospital, and directed that all news related to Huang on television and on the internet follow official releases from official state news agency Xinhua. False reports of Huang's death surfaced twice thereafter; some suggest his illness was used as an opportunity by internet users to vent about social and political problems. Despite his being incapacitated, Huang was elected as one of Shanghai's local party representatives to the Party's 17th Party Congress on 29 May.

== Death ==
On 2 June 2007, Huang Ju died in Beijing. In unprecedented fashion, the English and Chinese versions of his obituary were relayed simultaneously to the country and the world only a few hours after his death, at around 6:30 am Beijing time. Official Chinese news agency Xinhua reported that Huang had died at 2:03 am, of an unnamed illness, at age 68. His death was the top story on the national news program Xinwen Lianbo, where news anchors in black suits read off a dry and sober 155-word news item. The screen simply displayed "Comrade Huang Ju has passed away."

In his concise official obituary, he was hailed as a "long-tested and faithful Communist fighter and an outstanding leader of the party and the state." This posthumous designation was used for most of Communist China's high-ranking leaders. The official state media called Huang an "important member of the Central Committee Leadership under General Secretary Hu Jintao who dedicated his heart to the development of the Party and the State, and offered all of his intellectual strength and power for the cause." Former Party general secretary Jiang Zemin, in official footage, was in tears as he shook the hands of Huang's widow Yu Huiwen.

Websites reporting Huang Ju's death forbade discussions, and internet forums censored all negative comments and speculation about Huang Ju's political life. In Shanghai, where Huang was one of the city's former Mayors, reception of his death was cold. Among the mayors of Shanghai, Huang received the lowest ratings, while his contemporaries, Zhu Rongji and Xu Kuangdi, were more popular. There were no public displays of mourning in Shanghai.

Huang was the first PSC member to die in office since Chairman Mao himself in September 1976, some thirty years earlier, and the highest-ranking communist leader to die in office since economic reforms began in 1978. He was the only first vice premier ever to die in office.

=== Funeral ===
Huang's funeral was notable as one of the highest-ranking ceremonies for the death of any Communist leader since Deng Xiaoping's state funeral in 1997. It was the top story on CCTV's Xinwen Lianbo national news broadcast at 7 pm on 5 June 2007, and occupied well over ten minutes of broadcast time in the half-hour program. Despite its priority and importance, however, Huang's funeral was noticeably simpler than that of previous leaders. The official "funeral" (zhuidaohui; 追悼会) designation for deceased leaders was not used; rather, it was termed a "send-off ceremony" (gaobie yishi; 告别仪式). Analysts suggested that Huang's funeral may open the precedent for simple funerals for other deceased leaders. In a break with normally-strict rules of protocol, the funeral news coverage began with Zeng Qinghong standing at the hospital awaiting Huang Ju's funeral procession, and not with Hu Jintao. All high-ranking Chinese leaders, including general secretary and president Hu Jintao, premier Wen Jiabao, former paramount leader and party leader Jiang Zemin, and former premier Zhu Rongji, attended the ceremony.

=== Political impact ===
Huang's death opened a vacancy on the Politburo Standing Committee, which signaled an opportunity for the consolidation of Hu Jintao's power during the 17th Party Congress held in October 2007. However, most observers believed Huang's death would have a limited effect on Chinese politics, because Huang was absent from public life for over a year prior to his death. Huang's seat on the PSC was left vacant until a newly minted PSC at 17th Party Congress, which saw Li Keqiang being slated to take over for the position of first-ranked vice premier; in the interim, Wu Yi took over some of Huang's former responsibilities at the State Council as its vice premier.

Huang's death was nevertheless seen as a major political blow to the Shanghai Clique, a loose grouping of senior officials with connections to Shanghai and rose to prominence in the footsteps of the political career of party leader Jiang Zemin. The Shanghai Clique reportedly often found themselves at odds with those officials more closely aligned with Hu Jintao. Huang, along with disgraced Shanghai Party secretary Chen Liangyu, who was convicted and sent to prison on charges of fraud and corruption, were both seen as staunch political opponents of Hu and premier Wen Jiabao. Some commentators suggested that the timing of Huang's death conveniently absolved himself of any responsibility in the Shanghai pension scandal and spared him and his family from political disgrace, thus avoiding any open splits in the Party's top leadership.

== Legacy ==
Huang Ju was officially eulogized with some of the highest honours given to deceased Communist Party officials, being called "an outstanding member of the Communist Party of China, a long-tested faithful fighter of the Communist cause, and an extraordinary leader of the Party and State." Huang's tenure in Shanghai was marked with high levels of economic growth and a dramatic transformation of the city's skyline and urban infrastructure. Some Shanghai residents and political commentators suggest that Huang contributed significantly to the development of the Pudong area.

Huang faced significant criticism as well. Chinese-language media speculated that Huang provided "political shelter" for real estate mogul Zhou Zhengyi, allowing the latter a free hand in the forced eviction of local residents to pave way for his company's construction projects. Zhou would eventually be sentenced to three years in prison on charges of securities fraud. The sentence, which was seen as extremely lenient by the standards of Chinese law, was allegedly due to pressure applied by Huang Ju on the city's courts. Of the 42 major construction projects in the city during Huang's tenure in Shanghai, seven was reportedly awarded to Zhou. In addition, according to Weiquan lawyer Zheng Enchong and a civil group representing those affected by forced evictions, Huang continued to unduly influence the proceedings of the Zhou case by impeding its further investigation.

Huang's legacy was the subject of a photo collection book published by the Shanghai People's Press in December 2012, entitled Huang Ju. The book's title was inscribed with the calligraphy of Jiang Zemin. The book contained photos of Huang from his early years to his days as vice premier. Shanghai party chief Han Zheng attended the book launch event. The event signalled that Huang continued to be regarded positively in an official capacity.

== Personal ==
Huang was married to Yu Huiwen (余慧文), who was an executive on a Shanghai Pensions board, and speculated to be involved in corruption cases in the city.

In February 1995, his daughter, Daphne Huang (黄凡), married James Fang (方以伟), the son of Florence Fang (方李邦琴).

== See also ==
- Politics of China

Government offices
Preceded by Li Lanqing	First-ranked Vice Premier of China; 2003–2007	Succeeded by Wu Yi; Acting
Preceded by Zhu Rongji	Mayor of Shanghai; 1991–1994	Succeeded by Xu Kuangdi
Party political offices
Preceded by Wu Bangguo	Communist Party Committee Secretary of Shanghai; 1994–2002	Succeeded by Chen Liangyu
Order of precedence
Preceded by Zeng Qinghong; Vice President	6th Rank of the Chinese Communist Party; 16th Politburo Standing Committee	Succeeded by Wu Guanzheng; Discipline Secretary
