= JIA =

JIA or Jia may refer to

== Arts and entertainment ==
- Jia (EP), by Jia, 2017
- Jia (film), 2023 Australian short film
- Family (Ba Jin novel) (家, pinyin: Jiā), a 1931–1932 novel by Ba Jin

== People ==
- Jia (name) (simplified Chinese: 佳; traditional Chinese: 嘉) a Chinese name
- Jia (surname) (simplified Chinese: 贾; traditional Chinese: 賈), a Chinese surname
- Jia (singer) (孟佳; Mèng Jia; born 1990), Chinese singer

== Places ==
- Jia County, Henan (郏县), of Pingdingshan, Henan, China
- Jia County, Shaanxi (佳县), of Yulin, Shaanxi, China
- Jia, Guan County (贾镇), a town in Guan County, Shandong, China
- Jia, Iran, a village in Zanjan Province, Iran

== Transportation ==
- Juína Airport, Brazil, IATA code JIA
- Jacksonville International Airport, Florida, United States
- Jetstream International Airlines, later PSA Airlines, ICAO code JIA

== Other uses ==
- Japan Institute of Architects (JIA)
- Juvenile idiopathic arthritis (JIA), a disease of joints in young people
- Jia (vessel), a type of ancient Chinese bronze or pottery vessel
- Jia (甲, Kah), a unit of land measurement used in Taiwan
- Jia (甲; jiǎ), the first of the ten Heavenly Stems

== See also ==
- Jiah Khan (1988–2013), Indian film actress
- Jiya (disambiguation)
