= Chen Liangyu =

Former member of the Politburo of the Chinese Communist Party

- 陈良宇

Party Secretary of Shanghai
- In office October 22, 2002 – September 24, 2006
- Preceded by: Huang Ju
- Succeeded by: Han Zheng (acting)

Mayor of Shanghai
- In office December 7, 2001 – February 20, 2003
- Preceded by: Xu Kuangdi
- Succeeded by: Han Zheng

Personal details
- Born: October 24, 1946 (age 79) Shanghai, Republic of China
- Party: Chinese Communist Party
- Spouse: Huang Yiling
- Children: 1

Chen Liangyu
- Simplified Chinese: 陈良宇
- Traditional Chinese: 陳良宇
Transcriptions
Standard Mandarin
- Hanyu Pinyin: Chén Liángyǔ
Wu
- Romanization: [zəŋ][liã][jy]

Chen Liangyu (Chinese: 陈良宇; born October 24, 1946, in Shanghai) is a Chinese politician best known for his tenure as the Party Secretary of Shanghai, the city's top office, and a member of the Politburo of the Chinese Communist Party, from 2002 to 2006.

Chen worked in Shanghai for his entire public life, serving as mayor from 2001 to 2003. Chen took on numerous mega-projects while he was mayor, including the mass expansion of the Shanghai Subway and the construction of the Yangshan Port. Chen contributed to the city's economic development and was instrumental in Shanghai's bid to host the 2010 World Expo. Chen, a prominent member of the Shanghai clique, was also known for his political partisanship and opposition to the macro-economic control policies of the Hu–Wen Administration.

In September 2006, Chen was removed from office after a scandal came to light about the misuse of money in Shanghai's social security fund (see Shanghai pension scandal). He became the second incumbent Politburo member since the 1989 Tiananmen Square protests and massacre to be expelled from the party. In April 2008, Chen was sentenced to 18 years in prison upon conviction on charges of financial fraud and bribery.

== Rise to power ==
Chen graduated from the PLA Institute of Logistics Engineering, majoring in architecture. He had two years of experience working in the military between 1968 and 1970 as part of the PLA 6716 Squadron. From September 1970 to March 1983, Chen worked at the Shanghai Pengpu Machinery Factory as a worker and estimator. He was eventually promoted to the capital construction branch vice-section chief. He also went on a year-long sabbatical to Tongji University. In March 1983 he was promoted to become deputy plant manager of the Shanghai Pengpu machine factory, as well as the party committee deputy secretary of the Shanghai Metallurgy Mining Machinery Company. He joined the Chinese Communist Party (CCP) in April 1980. By March 1984, Chen gained further promotion, becoming the CCP Secretary for Shanghai's Electronic Appliances Bureau. Between January 1985 and February 1987, he became bureau chief and assistant commissioner of the Shanghai Municipal Party Committee – Old cadre bureau. In February 1987, Chen gained a posting as the new magistrate for Huangpu District in Shanghai. He went on sabbatical studying public administration at the University of Birmingham from January to September 1992 through a UK government-funded Chevening Scholarship.

Chen was promoted to be Deputy Mayor of Shanghai in 1996, concurrently holding the CCP Vice-Secretary position. As then CCP General Secretary Jiang Zemin made his political manoeuvers before the 16th Party Congress in 2002 to strengthen the Shanghai power base with his loyalties, Chen became the beneficiary, replacing then-Mayor Xu Kuangdi, becoming Mayor of Shanghai in late 2002, and Secretary of the CCP Shanghai Municipal Committee in February 2003. He was therefore granted membership in the Politburo of the CCP Central Committee. As an ally of former general secretary Jiang Zemin, Chen was to keep Jiang's Shanghai base of power while CCP General Secretary Hu Jintao was given all official positions of power. Chen is believed to be linked to real estate magnate and banker Zhou Zhengyi in the Shanghai Real Estate scandals, where residents were forced to relocate for new housing developments where old-style apartments were being demolished to build modern-style condominiums.

== Mayor and party chief of Shanghai ==
Chen Liangyu became the CCP Committee Secretary for Shanghai in November 2002, the city's top office. As is customary for the occupants of this office, he was also given a seat on the Politburo of the 16th CCP Central Committee. During Chen's term in office, Shanghai's economy grew rapidly, which contributed to significant improvements in the living standards of the city's residents.

=== Economic growth ===
During Chen's term in office, Shanghai's average annual economic growth rate stood at about 13%, at the forefront of the country, had an average annual revenue growth of over 20%, and over the years turned over to the proportion of the central finance more than 15%. The annual import and export volume of the Port of Shanghai exceeded 400 billion U.S. dollars, at an average annual increase of over 30%. The cargo throughput of the port exceeded 500 million tons, ranking first in the world. Municipal infrastructure and large-scale industrial production construction projects proceeded at a rapid pace; prominent examples include the Yangshan Deepwater Port (Figure), the Shanghai World Financial Center, the Shanghai Metro, and Jiangnan Shipyard Changxing Island base, and the Shanghai Chemical Industrial Zone. These large scale projects cemented Shanghai's position as the economic heart of the country.

=== Improving the livelihood of the people and helping the poor ===
Urban traffic congestion and poor public transit had been a long-standing problem in Shanghai. Chen Liangyu was personally invested in the issue, and during his term in office Shanghai saw significant improvements to its transit system and transport infrastructure. As a result of the urban rail construction during Chen's term, the Metro overtook buses as the main transport tool for most Shanghai residents. Additionally, Mr. Chen oversaw the construction of bridges and tunnels on the Huangpu River, such as the Lupu Bridge. Opening several new arterial bridges relieved pressure from existing bridges and tunnels, thus easing traffic jams.

Due to historical reasons, the Shanghai area had large areas of shanty towns and old-fashioned neighborhoods, a large number of residents faced a housing shortage and poor living conditions. Chen Liangyu led the Shanghai municipal government in a vigorous urban transformation, in conjunction with the municipal engineering reasonable relocation and resettlement. This not only beautified the urban environment and improved the living conditions of the people, but it is also especially important due to the relocation and resettlement of the household population based on a per capita metric, which solved the housing problems of a large number of people, especially the impoverished, and reduced the burden of rising housing prices.

Under Chen Liangyu's leadership, pollution in the Suzhou River, which had long plagued Shanghai, came under management. The Suzhou River water pollution problem was greatly reduced. Additionally, the landscape around the Suzhou River underwent massive changes.

Chen Liangyu as the party secretary of Shanghai repeatedly stressed the need to protect low-income and vulnerable members of society. Mr. Chen started at the grassroots and personally visited people who were less well-off; he additionally supervised the implementation of policy measures combating poverty. Chen Liangyu also used a variety of tools to ensure the welfare of the people of Shanghai, including improving pensions and health insurance and other social security programs, developing measures to increase active employees and retirees income, and increasing employment opportunities. Average life expectancy exceeded 80 years of age, and residents of Shanghai reportedly felt a greater sense of belonging and pride with regard to their city.

=== Reform, innovation, and opening wider to world ===
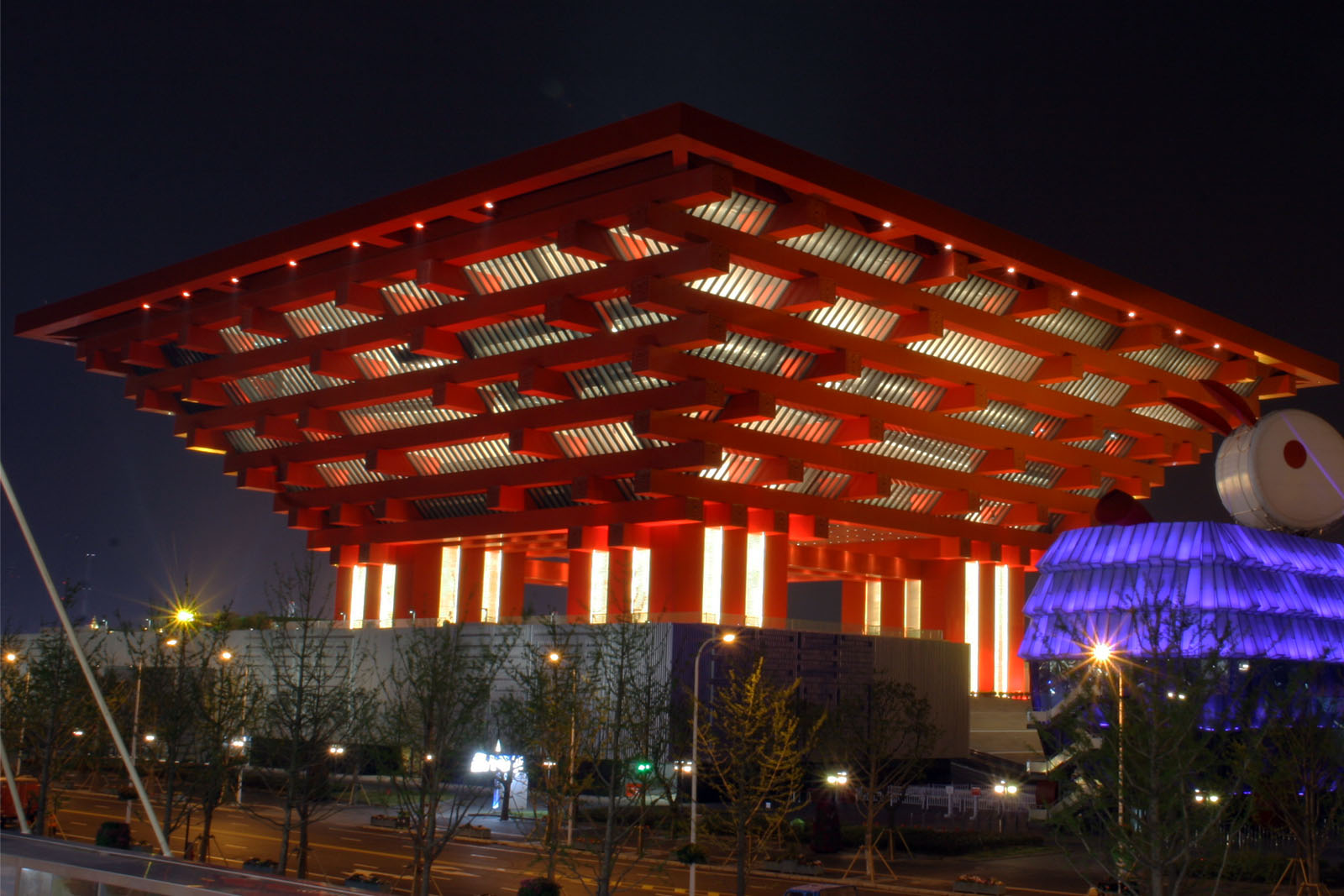
China pavilion at Expo 2010

One of the landmarks of the Shanghai World Expo China Pavilion Night Scene With Shanghai's economic development, the traditional model of development that relies on cheap labor and high energy consumption has become increasingly constrained further development. To this end, Chen Liangyu, Shanghai should improve the capability of independent innovation, economic growth by a "resource-dependent" to "innovation-driven". Meanwhile, Chen Liangyu to implement the "technological innovation" and the city through science and education strategy, to increase investment in education, the proportion of Shanghai education and research funding has increased year by year, gradually improving the system of lifelong education. In addition, Chen Liangyu, pioneering the development of a recycling economy in order to reduce the consumption of resources and strengthening environmental protection. These measures, so that the industrial structure of Shanghai's overall progress, and the formation and the gradual consolidation of the core competitiveness during Shanghai's economy has maintained double-digit growth, while energy consumption annual growth of only about 5%.

In opening up, Chen Liangyu presided over planning the 2010 Shanghai World Expo – the bid, construction and preparation work, to develop a number of measures to support the Shanghai bid to host the World Expo and then to attract countries to the stadium stationed in Shanghai World Expo of Governments, and during, exhibitors Affairs made significant progress, confirmed exhibitors for the number of countries and international organizations to create a historical record. Meanwhile, Chen Liangyu vigorously the introduction of foreign capital, and other means to expand the level of opening up in Shanghai, to improve Shanghai's international transparency, speed up Shanghai as an international metropolis, the pace of reconstruction.

=== Cultural heritage and dialect protection ===
Shanghai primary school in Professor Shanghai dialect Shanghai was known as the "lost culture Highland has a rich historical and cultural heritage, Chen Liangyu, that culture is the essence of a city, soul and lifeblood of focus on carrying forward the revival of Shanghai's specialty boutique culture and emphasis on the protection of historic buildings in Shanghai. In addition, from the beginning of the 1990s, Shanghai vigorously promote Mandarin, Shanghai dialect as the core of local culture (Shanghai culture) has become increasingly subject to compression, an increasingly grim situation. As the leadership of Shanghai, Chen Liangyu, on this issue to take a more flexible method is relatively effective protection of the local culture and the Shanghai dialect, the Shanghai public affirmation.

=== Counterpart support and regional cooperation ===
As the officials in charge of China's economic center Shanghai, Chen Liangyu advocate services nationwide, to support the economic construction of the other provinces and municipalities should be in the development of its own premise, in its term of office, the scale of foreign aid and economic cooperation expand personnel exchanges and mutual learning exchanges are becoming increasingly active.

=== Controversy ===
Along with Mayor Han Zheng, Chen continued the CCP's reformation, and during his leadership, Shanghai was selected as the host city for Expo 2010. Chen was officially credited with dramatically increasing the size and efficiency of Shanghai's public transportation. Shanghai's rising real estate prices have plagued the city since 2002, and rose over 200% during Chen's term in office as the city's Party Chief, as ordinary Shanghai citizens found it increasingly difficult to find a place to live. The real estate network had a history of being monopolized. The government had attempted to assert control, but because of the inevitable link between the government and private businesses, many deals were cut in which Chen was implicated. Chen also held major interests in the Shanghai Shenhua football squad, attending all of their home matches and even supervising some practices.

His image in the city during his tenure as mayor was divisive. He initiated a series of gigantic projects to be finished in time for Shanghai's hosting of the 2010 World Exposition, including shipping 128,000 tons of sand to create a beach in Shanghai's suburbs, building a $209 million world-class tennis complex and a $300 million Formula One circuit racetrack. His most controversial project was the proposed Shanghai-Hangzhou mag-lev train. Opponents of Chen painted him as corrupt, short-tempered, and despotic during Municipal Committee meetings which he chaired. Supporters of Chen credited him with openness and saw him as a progressive leader crucial to Shanghai's economic and social development on the international scene. Other observers saw Chen as an effective local administrator in Shanghai, but an impediment to nationwide equalization and macroeconomic controls (otherwise known as 宏观调控 Hongguan Tiaokong).

During his term, Chen sold massive amounts of land to his brother who resold the land for more than tenfold, becoming Shanghai's real estate magnate.

Chen's son, Chen Weili, was made an executive of the Shanghai Shenhua football club shortly after graduating from university.

== Pension scandal ==
In August 2006, Qin Yu, one of Chen's top aides, was abruptly dismissed from his position as Baoshan District governor and arrested, charged with the misappropriation of $400 million of the city's pension funds. The city's social security coffers managed more than 10 billion yuan (US$1.25 billion) in assets. Instead of investing the money in low-risk government bonds and bank deposits, it was invested in expensive real estate and toll road projects around the city. It was suspected that the city's top leadership figures, including Chen, could be implicated in the scandal.

During Chen's term as party chief, he routinely pursued policies that drew friction from the party's central leadership and the policies of the general secretary Hu Jintao. Hu's government favoured balanced regional economic development and feared social divisions resulting from a widening wealth gap, and thus attempted to rein in regional leaders who wanted to pursue rapid economic development which they viewed as overtly favoring regional economic interests. Chen reportedly clashed with Premier Wen Jiabao openly at a Politburo meeting in Beijing over the issue of economic development, indicating that Chen believed the Premier was standing in the way of China's economic development. Chen's statements at municipal meetings also charted a new independent course; Chen opposed the Communist Party's long-held convention that "Marxism serves as the guiding scientific principle." Rather, Chen claimed to rely upon "all forms of science" – signaling he was at odds with the Communist Party's orthodoxy.

On September 25, citing alleged involvement in the pension scandal, Chen was dismissed as Shanghai party chief and suspended from his membership in the party's Central Committee and its Politburo. A team composed of some one hundred investigators from central authorities in Beijing was sent to Shanghai to investigate. Two days before his dismissal, Chen and mayor Han Zheng went to Beijing to meet with Hu Jintao. There Chen was detained, and only Han returned to Shanghai. The authorities carefully managed the transfer of authority in Shanghai. On the day of Chen's dismissal, Han Zheng returned to Shanghai at 3 am and called an official meeting to deliver Beijing's decision that Chen was suspended because of the scandal and that Han himself was assuming the post of acting party chief. Chen was charged with "helping further the economic interests of illegal business people", "protecting staff who severely violated laws and discipline" and "furthering the interests of family members by taking advantage of his official posts."

There was also speculation that Chen's sacking occurred for political reasons. Chen was a protégé of former general secretary Jiang Zemin and considered a core member of the Shanghai Clique. In carving out a local fiefdom for himself and willing to boldly deviate from the party's official economic policies, Chen was seen as a serious rival to general secretary Hu Jintao, and his dismissal was interpreted as a political victory for Hu. Chen was the highest-ranking Chinese official to be sacked since former Beijing party secretary Chen Xitong (no relation) was removed from office in 1994 on charges of corruption. The Shanghai pension scandal also led to the dismissal of the chief of the Municipal Labour and Social Security Bureau Zhu Junyi, and the downfall of several prominent businessmen, the executives of Shanghai's biggest industrial conglomerate, and other city officials. For a period of time, it was also believed that the scandal would implicate the family and associates of then Vice-Premier and Politburo Standing Committee member Huang Ju. However, Huang died in 2007, and no case against him was ever pursued.

After Han Zheng served a few months as acting party chief, Zhejiang party chief Xi Jinping was transferred to Shanghai to take over the position of party secretary. Xi would go on to become a member of the Politburo Standing Committee in 2007 and General Secretary of the Chinese Communist Party in 2012.

== Expulsion and trial ==
In July 2007, Chen was expelled from the Communist Party, and his case was transferred to judicial authorities. In comparison to the judicial action against Chen Xitong, Chen's case proceeded at a much faster pace. During the investigation, Chen was placed under house arrest in Qinhuangdao, where he lived in a mansion and spent most of his time playing cards and reading, ordering his meals from menus. Thereafter, Chen was transferred to Qincheng Prison in the Changping District of Beijing.

Chen's trial began in late March 2008. He was represented by Beijing lawyers Gao Zicheng and Liu Limu. He faced three charges: embezzlement, abuse of power, and dereliction of duty. Chen acknowledged that he was "partially responsible" for the pension fund scandal, but pleaded 'not guilty' to the charges. However, he was found guilty by the court. Chen was largely cooperative during the court proceedings. At the end of the trial on March 25, Chen stated "I am sorry to the party, the people of Shanghai, and my family". On April 11, 2008, Chen, 61, was sentenced to 18 years in prison for accepting 2.39 million yuan (~$340,000) in bribes and abusing power, specifically, for stock manipulation, financial fraud and his role in the city pension fund scandal, at the No. 2 Intermediate People's Court, Tianjin. Chen Liangyu's 18 years imprisonment ended on July 25, 2025.

== See also ==
- Zhang Rongkun
- Politics of the People's Republic of China

Party political offices
Preceded by Huang Ju	Party Secretary of Shanghai; 2002–2006	Succeeded by Han Zheng (Acting)
Government offices
Preceded by Xu Kuangdi	Mayor of Shanghai; 2002–2003	Succeeded by Han Zheng
