= Song (disambiguation) =

A song is a musical composition for voice or voices.

Song(s) or The Song may also refer to:

== Arts and entertainment ==
=== Music ===
- Song, a music arrangement
- Song, a vocal performance

==== Albums ====
- Song (Lullaby for the Working Class album), 2012
- Song (It's Immaterial album)
- Song, an LP from the Classics IV, 1970
- A Song (Neil Sedaka album), 1977
- A Song, by Pablo Moses 1980
- Songs (Admiral Freebee album), 2005
- Songs (Luther Vandross album), 1994
- Songs (Regina Spektor album), 2002
- Songs (Rich Mullins album), 1996
- Songs (Kate Micucci EP), 2008
- Songs (Rusko album), 2012
- Songs (Fra Lippo Lippi album), 1985
- Songs (Rotary Connection album), 1969
- Songs (Spiers and Boden album), 2005
- Songs (Willie Nelson album), 2005
- Songs (Plácido Domingo album), 2012
- Songs (John Maus album), 2006
- Songs (Adrianne Lenker album), 2020

==== Songs ====
- "Song", by Avail from their album Dixie
- "Songs", by Helen Reddy from her album Love Song for Jeffrey
- "Song", by Theo Tams
- "Song", by the 3rd and the Mortal from their album Tears Laid in Earth

=== Films ===
- Song (film), a 1928 British-German film
- Geet or The Song, a 1944 Bollywood film
- The Song (2014 film), an American film
- Songs (Stan Brakhage cycle)

=== Literature ===
- "Song", a poem by English poet John Donne
- Song poem, song lyrics that have been set to music for a fee, in 20th Century North America
- Song poetry, poetry during the Chinese Song Dynasty (960–1279)

== Places ==
- Song, Nigeria, an area
- Song, Malaysia, the capital of the Song District, Malaysia
- Mount Song, in Henan, China
- Song County, in Henan, China
- Song district, in Phrae Province, Thailand

== People with the name ==
- Song (Chinese surname), a romanization of the Chinese surname 宋
- Song (Korean surname), romanization of the Korean surname 송 (宋, 松, or 訟)
- Song, a variant romanization of the Chinese surname Cháng 常
- Alex Song (born 1987), Cameroonian footballer and nephew of Rigobert Song
- Rigobert Song (born 1976), Cameroonian footballer and uncle of Alex Song
- Brenda Song (born 1988), Hmong American actress

== Science and technology ==
- Bird song, a type of bird vocalization
- Whale vocalization of some whales
- Song typeface, a category of typefaces

== Chinese history ==
- Song (state) (宋) (11th century–286 BC), a state during the Spring and Autumn period
- Liu Song dynasty (劉宋) (420–479), the first of the Southern dynasties during the Northern and Southern dynasties period
- Song (宋) (623–624), a short-lived state established by Fu Gongshi during the Sui–Tang transition
- Song dynasty (宋朝) (960–1279), an imperial dynasty of China
  - Northern Song (960–1127) (北宋) (960–1127)
  - Southern Song (南宋) (1127–1279)
- Song (宋) (1351–1360), also called "Tianwan" (天完), a state established by Xu Shouhui
- Song (宋) (1355–1366), a state established by Han Lin'er; see Red Turban Rebellions

== Transportation ==
- Song (airline), a former low-fare airline in the US
- Song-class submarine, a class of diesel-electric submarines of the People's Liberation Army Navy
- BYD Song, a Chinese car

== Other uses ==
- San Onofre Nuclear Generating Station, US

== See also ==
- Song cycle, a group of individually complete songs performed as a unit
- Song of Songs, a book of the Hebrew Bible, also referred to Song of Solomon
- This Song (disambiguation)
- Two Songs (disambiguation)
- 3 Songs (disambiguation)
- 4 Songs (disambiguation)
- 5 Songs (disambiguation)
- Song of Solomon (disambiguation)
