= Shanghai clique =

Political faction in China

- Leader: Jiang Zemin
- Members: Wu Bangguo; Huang Ju; Zeng Qinghong; Jia Qinglin; Chen Liangyu; Chen Zhili; Jia Ting'an
- Founded: 1989
- Dissolved: 2022
- Headquarters: Shanghai and Beijing
- Ideology: Socialism with Chinese characteristics; Three Represents; Neoauthoritarianism

Shanghai clique
- Simplified Chinese: 上海帮
- Traditional Chinese: 上海幫
Transcriptions
Standard Mandarin
- Hanyu Pinyin: Shànghǎi bāng

The Shanghai clique, also referred to as the Shanghai gang, Jiang clique, or Jiang faction, refers to an informal group of Chinese Communist Party (CCP) officials who rose to prominence under former CCP General Secretary Jiang Zemin while he served as the party secretary and mayor of Shanghai.

Chinese politics have long been defined by the competition between intra-party factions' ability to place key members and allies in positions of power within the CCP and Chinese government. In the 1990s when Jiang Zemin was the CCP General Secretary, Chinese politics was dominated by the Shanghai gang as Jiang attempted to place cultivated ideological followers in senior positions within the CCP. Under Hu Jintao, the Shanghai gang balanced Hu's Chinese Communist Youth League (CCYL) faction in the CCP and under Xi Jinping, the Shanghai gang continued to contend with Xi's faction wherein both factions attempt to obtain the political upper-hand through the nomination of chosen officials to senior roles. After the 20th Party Congress and Jiang Zemin's death in 2022, the Shanghai clique is no longer a visible faction within Chinese Communist Party.

== History ==
=== Origins ===
The Shanghai clique originated in June 1989, when Jiang Zemin, then Party secretary of Shanghai, was elevated as General Secretary of Communist Party after Tiananmen Square protests. However, in the first few years, Jiang was under heavy influence of party elders such as Deng Xiaoping and Chen Yun. During this time, Jiang only elevated Zeng Qinghong, then Deputy Party secretary of Shanghai, into Beijing to become deputy director of Central Office. After the 14th Party Congress in 1992, some of Jiang's close associates such as Li Lanqing and Wu Bangguo were able to earn a seat in the Politburo. In the following years, some of the Jiang's close associates were placed in important positions. Wu Bangguo became Vice Premier in 1994, and Huang Ju became Party Secretary of Shanghai as well as entered Politburo in the same year. Jia Qinglin, another close associate with Jiang Zemin, became Party secretary of Fujian in 1993. Zeng Qinghong also took over the Central Office in 1993, when he took over the position of director of the office from Wen Jiabao. Some of Jiang's political opponents were removed from key positions. Chen Xitong, then Party secretary of Beijing and a member of Politburo, was arrested due to the corruption charge in 1995, but many thought that Chen's downfall was mainly due to his bad relationship with Jiang Zemin and opposing some of Jiang's policies. Following the deterioration of Deng Xiaoping's health in late 1994, the Shanghai clique is becoming more powerful, and Shanghai clique eventually became the dominant force in Chinese politics after the death of Deng Xiaoping in 1997, where some of Jiang's close associates such as Li Lanqing gained a seat in the powerful CCP Politburo Standing Committee and others like Huang Ju, Zeng Qinghong, Li Changchun, and Jia Qinglin all entered politburo. Qiao Shi, the main political rival to Jiang Zemin, was retired in the same year after the Shanghai clique used Qiao's age as the reason to ask him to step down. However, Jiang could not choose his successor since Deng Xiaoping already handpicked Hu Jintao as Jiang's successor in 1992.

Jiang stepped down as General Secretary in November 2002 after the 16th Party Congress, and Hu Jintao became the new General Secretary. However, Jiang remained the position as Chairman of central military commission, and he successfully elevated several member of the Shanghai clique into the Politburo Standing Committee, including Chairman of National People's Congress Wu Bangguo, Chairman of CPPCC Jia Qinglin, Vice President Zeng Qinghong, Vice Premier Huang Ju, and propaganda chief Li Changchun. Hu Jintao's only ally in the Politburo Standing Committee was Premier Wen Jiabao, which put Hu in a relatively weak position as General Secretary.

After Hu Jintao became general secretary of the CCP Central Committee in 2002, many commentary books on the relationship between the Shanghai Gang and the central government headed by Hu were published outside mainland China, while on the mainland it was taboo to talk about this issue. In the Political Bureau of the CCP Central Committee elected by the 16th and 17th CCP National Congresses, the "Shanghai Gang" occupied several positions on the Standing Committee. On September 19, 2004, Jiang Zemin resigned as chairman of the Military Commission, but still retained his office of the Chairman of the Military Commission until the 18th National Congress of the Chinese Communist Party in 2012.

=== Under Hu Jintao ===
On September 24, 2006, Chen Liangyu, secretary of the CCP Shanghai Municipal Committee and an important member of the Shanghai Gang, was dismissed for his involvement in the Shanghai Social Security Fund case. Overseas media pointed out that this was the result of a Communist Youth League (headed by Hu Jintao) campaign against the Shanghai Gang and corruption. In March 2007, Xi Jinping, then secretary of the Zhejiang Provincial Party Committee of the Chinese Communist Party, was transferred to Shanghai to serve as the secretary of the Municipal Party Committee, becoming the first municipal Party secretary to be parachuted from other places since 1985.

On June 2, 2007, Huang Ju, then a member of the Standing Committee of the Political Bureau of the CCP Central Committee and Vice Premier of the State Council, passed away, which was another serious blow to the Shanghai Gang. Huang Ju's wife, Yu Huiwen, was accused ofhaving illegally appropriated billions of yuan from Shanghai social security funds. Less than two months after Huang Ju's death, Wang Weigong, deputy general manager of Shanghai Shenergy Group, who had served as Huang Ju's secretary, was also arrested for his involvement in the Shanghai Social Security Fund fraud case.

In 2011, Commonwealth magazine stated that the power struggle between the central government of the Chinese Communist Party, controlled by Hu Jintao and Wen Jiabao, and the local forces in Shanghai, led by Jiang Zemin, had worsened because the Shanghai Gang advocated that economic development in coastal areas should not be affected by the development of rural areas.

=== Under Xi Jinping ===
In November 2012, Xi Jinping took over as General Secretary of the CCP Central Committee, and Wu Bangguo, Jia Qinglin, Li Changchun and Zhou Yongkang, who were regarded as important members of the Shanghai Gang among the 17th Central Political Bureau Standing Committee, retired after the 18th CCP National Congress. Among the newly elected members of the Politburo Standing Committee of the 18th Central Committee, the Jiang faction was still considered to have the majority. However, after Xi Jinping and Wang Qishan launched an anti-corruption campaign after the 18th National Congress, many Jiang faction officials were sacked in this anti-corruption campaign, including Zhou Yongkang, the former secretary of the Political and Legal Committee of the Central Committee of the Chinese Communist Party, Guo Boxiong, the former vice chairman of the Central Military Commission of the Chinese Communist Party, also Xu Caihou and others loyal to the Shanghai Clique.

==== 2014 Investigations in Shanghai ====
According to a BBC report, on July 29, 2014, after Zhou Yongkang was announced to be under investigation, the Central Inspection Team was stationed in Shanghai. Zhou Yongkang, a former member of the Standing Committee of the Political Bureau of the CCP Central Committee, is regarded as Jiang Zemin's confidant, and Shanghai is Jiang Zemin's base. After the central inspection team arrived in Shanghai, Wang Zongnan, the former chairman of Shanghai Bright Food Group, was put on file. Wang Zongnan was one of Jiang Zemin's confidants. Zhou Yongkang was one of the first targets of Xi Jinping's anti-corruption campaign. On August 1, 2014, the Liberty Times quoted the Financial Times as saying that Jiang Zemin, who was 87 years old at the time, had stepped down as General Secretary of the CCP Central Committee after the 16th National Congress of the Chinese Communist Party in 2002 and resigned from the Political Bureau of the CCP Central Committee. The gang still retains huge influence within the party. Four or five of the seven standing members of the Political Bureau of the CCP Central Committee are members of the Jiang faction. The current general secretary Xi Jinping's anti-corruption campaign will turn to Jiang Zemin's stronghold, the Shanghai Gang. The inspection team of the Central Commission for Discipline Inspection was stationed in Shanghai, and people with knowledge of the matter told the Financial Times that Jiang Zemin's influence in the party and the military had angered Xi, and that the anti-corruption investigation had targeted many of Jiang Zemin's associates, including Xu Caihou, the former vice chairman of the Central Military Commission. Wang Zongnan, who served as chairman of Bright Food Group, was also investigated on suspicion of embezzling public funds and accepting bribes.

==== 2020 Investigations in Shanghai ====
From October to December 2020, the sixth round of inspections of the 19th Central Committee were officially launched, and the fourth inspection team of the Central Committee visited Shanghai again, after a lapse of six years. On February 3, 2021, Zhao Fengtong, the leader of the Fourth Inspection Team of the Central Committee, reported to Li Qiang, Secretary of the CCP Shanghai Municipal Committee, the problems existing in Shanghai's officialdom, and handed over the clues of some leading cadres, to the Central Commission, for Discipline Inspection and the Central Organization Department.

==== Further developments ====
The influence of the faction declined further following the 20th CCP National Congress. The 20th Politburo, elected immediately after the Congress, had no members affiliated with the Shanghai clique.

== Membership ==
Important people who have been identified as belonging to the clique include incumbent standing members of the powerful Politburo of the CCP Central Committee. Members of the Shanghai clique are marked by their tendency to represent urban business interests of the coastal regions, many of them princelings, the children of revolutionary veterans, and their expertise in commercial affairs.

=== Inner circle ===
The following individuals owe part of their career advancement to personal support from Jiang. They are listed in rough order of how often they are associated as being part of Jiang's inner circle:

- Li Changchun
- Zhou Yongkang
- Zhang Dejiang
- Liu Yunshan
- Zhang Gaoli
- Yang Xiong
- Han Zheng
- Zeng Peiyan
- Hui Liangyu
- Liu Qi
- Hua Jianmin
- Wu Guanzheng

=== Clique ===
These people have been commonly identified as members of the Shanghai clique:

- Jiang Zemin, former General Secretary of the Communist Party
- Wu Bangguo
- Huang Ju
- Zeng Qinghong
- Jia Qinglin
- Chen Liangyu
- Chen Zhili
- Jia Ting'an

Meng Jianzhu, successor of Zhou Yongkang, also served in prominent positions in Shanghai, however they are not closely associated with Jiang and thus are usually not named as part of the Shanghai clique. Likewise, Premier Zhu Rongji, while having climbed through the ranks in Shanghai, was not necessarily associated with Jiang personally.

== See also ==
- Politics of China
- Tuanpai
- Qinghua clique
