= Song of Solomon (disambiguation) =

The Song of Solomon, or Song of Songs, is a book of the Old Testament.

Song of Solomon may also refer to:

- Song of Solomon (novel), 1977, by Toni Morrison
- Song of Solomon, a 2001 extended play by Pantokrator
- "The Song of Solomon", a song on Kate Bush's 1993 album The Red Shoes
- "Song of Solomon", a song from the 2009 album Animals as Leaders by Animals as Leaders
- "Song of Solomon", a song from the 2012 album Return to Life by War of Ages
