= Edith Jiya =

Malawian corporate executive

- Born: 1972 (age 53–54); Malawi
- Citizenship: Malawian
- Education: University of Malawi (bachelor's degree); University of Derby (master's degree)
- Occupation: Business executive
- Years active: 2000–present
- Title: Group chief executive officer of Old Mutual Malawi Limited

Edith Jiya is a Malawian businesswoman and corporate executive who was the group chief executive officer of Old Mutual Malawi Limited. She also sat on the boards of approximately a dozen public and private Malawian companies and businesses.

== Background and education ==
She was born in Malawi and attended local elementary and secondary schools. She was admitted to the University of Malawi, where she graduated with a bachelor's degree. Later, she studied at the University of Derby, in the United Kingdom, where she obtained a master's degree. She is also a qualified Chartered Insurer, since 2013. Edith Jiya is an Associate Member of The Chartered Institute of Marketing and of the Chartered Insurance Institute.

== Career ==
She started out as an aviation fuels business manager at BP Malawi Limited, serving in that capacity for over six years, from 2001 until 2007.

In 2007, she joined Old Mutual Malawi Limited. From 2011 Edith Jiya was the general manager of Old Mutual Life Assurance Company Malawi Limited, a subsidiary of Old Mutual Malawi Limited, serving there until 2015. In 2015, she was appointed as Acting Group CEO at Old Mutual Malawi Limited.

On 1 March 2017, she was appointed as substantive group CEO at Old Mutual Malawi Limited, replacing Chris Kapanga, who retired.

== Other considerations ==
As of August 2020, in addition to her responsibilities as group CEO of Old Mutual Malawi Limited, Edith Jiya serves as the Chairperson of 1. Old Mutual Unit Trusts Company Malawi Limited 2. Old Mutual Investment Group Malawi and 3. Malawi Properties and Investments Company (Mpico)

In addition to all the above, she sits on the boards of the following Malawian companies and businesses: 1. FDH Bank 2. Malawi Telecommunications Limited 3. Ubuntu Limited 4. FDH Financial Holdings Limited 5. Holy Family College of Nursing & Midwifery 6. Insurance Institute of Malawi and 7. Open Connect Limited.

== See also ==
- List of banks in Malawi
- Old Mutual South Africa
