= Yang Xiong (politician) =

Chinese politician (1953–2021)

- 杨雄
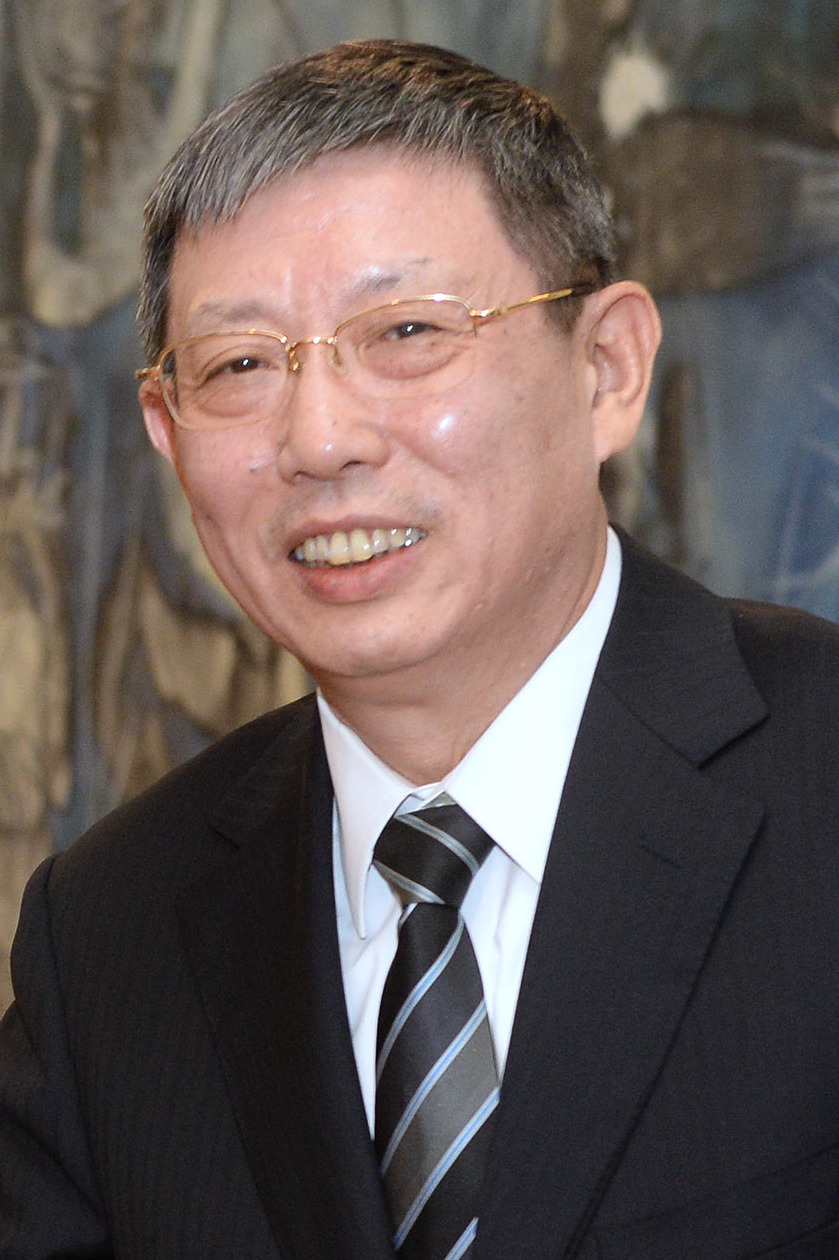
- Yang in 2016

Mayor of Shanghai
- In office 26 December 2012 – 17 January 2017; Acting until 1 February 2013
- Preceded by: Han Zheng
- Succeeded by: Ying Yong

Personal details
- Born: November 1953 Nanhui, Jiangsu (now Pudong, Shanghai), China
- Died: 12 April 2021 (aged 67) Huashan Hospital, Shanghai, China
- Party: Chinese Communist Party
- Education: Chinese Academy of Social Sciences

Yang Xiong (Chinese: 杨雄; November 1953 – 12 April 2021) was a Chinese politician and business executive who served as Mayor of Shanghai, and prior to that, Chairman of Shanghai Airlines. Yang was a graduate of the Chinese Academy of Social Sciences with a master's degree in economics.

== Career ==
Yang Xiong traced his ancestry to the Hangzhou area of Zhejiang province, but was born in Nanhui County, Jiangsu province (now part of Pudong, Shanghai). He completed a graduate degree from the Chinese Academy of Social Sciences in July 1985. He worked in a variety of positions including chairman of Shanghai Airlines. In February 2001 he was transferred to the municipal government of Shanghai. In February 2003 he became a vice mayor of Shanghai and in January 2008 was promoted to executive vice mayor.

On 26 December 2012 Yang's predecessor Han Zheng, who had been elevated to the position of Communist Party Secretary of Shanghai, resigned as mayor and Yang was appointed the acting mayor of Shanghai in place of Han. On 1 February 2013, he was elected Mayor of Shanghai by the Municipal People's Congress.

On 17 January 2017, Yang resigned as mayor. He was replaced by Ying Yong.

Unusual for an official of his rank, Yang was never a full nor alternate member of the Central Committee of the Chinese Communist Party.

Yang died surprisingly on 12 April 2021 at Huashan Hospital due to heart failure. He was 67.

Government offices
Preceded by Han Zheng	Mayor of Shanghai; 2012–2017	Succeeded by Ying Yong
