= Ch'in Chia =

Chinese poet

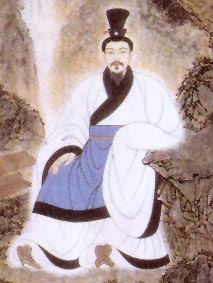
- Born: 1st century BC
- Died: 1st century AD
- Occupation: Poet
- Writing career
- Period: Eastern Han dynasty

Ch'in Chia (Chinese: 秦嘉; courtesy name: Shih-hui), also known as Qin Jia (c. first century BC – first century AD), was a Chinese poet of the Eastern Han dynasty.

== Name ==
The word "Ch'in Chia" means all relations who bear a different family name.

== Life ==
Ch'in Chia came from Lunghsi. He lived during the Eastern Han dynasty, and was a civil servant.

=== Separation from his wife ===
He was married to Hsu Shu, who was also a poet. They had a very harmonious relationship.

When Ch'in Chia was promoted to the post of commandery supervisor at the capital (Luoyang), and summoned to take up an appointment there, his wife fell ill and had to stay at home with her parents. He was therefore unable to say goodbye to her personally, and sent her a series of three poems instead, entitled "Poems for My Wife".

Hsu Shu, in her turn, responded by sending him poems of her own, maintaining a loving correspondence, of which the following is a sample:

"One separation breeds ten thousand regrets."

— Ch'in Chia (c.150 BC)

Alas! I wish I were your shadow and
Never to be separated from your dear self.
I still hope you will enjoy the capital
And do not feel too unhappy for my sake.

== Poetry ==
Ch'in Chia's first poem to his wife expresses his sorrow at their separation, and longing for reunion:

Mindful that I had soon to leave on service,
Farther and farther away from you every day,
I sent a carriage to bring you back;
But it went empty, and empty it returned.
I read your letter with feelings of distress;
At meals I cannot eat;
And I sit alone in this desolate chamber.
Who is there to solace and encourage me?
Through the long nights I cannot sleep,
And solitary I lie prostrate on my pillow, tossing and turning.
Sorrow comes as in a circle
And cannot be rolled up like a mat.

== Legacy and influence ==
A 1968 edition of China Today explains that "Ch'in Chia and his wife Hsui Shu are supposed to be a couple of constant and profound lovers and therefore have often been referred to as such in subsequent ages by people when they laud wedded bliss."

Anne Birrell, in Games Poets Play, stated: "Ch'in Chia's expression of helpless melancholy and graceful, gallant compliments influenced the development of poems on conjugal love."
