= Qin Yu =

Chinese politician (born 1964)

- Chinese: 秦裕
Transcriptions
Standard Mandarin
- Hanyu Pinyin: Qín Yù

Qin Yu (born June 1964) was briefly the chief of Baoshan District in Shanghai, China. He was removed from office on 29 August 2006 as part of a widening probe into corruption involving the mishandling of funds from Shanghai's municipal pension system. Qin had close ties to former Shanghai Party Chief Chen Liangyu, having once worked as Chen's personal secretary during Chen's mayorship of Shanghai.

== See also ==
- Chen Liangyu
- Zhang Rongkun
- Zhu Junyi
