= 16th Politburo =

16th Politburo may refer to:

- 16th Politburo of the Chinese Communist Party
- Politburo of the 16th Congress of the All-Union Communist Party (Bolsheviks)
- 16th Politburo of the Communist Party of Czechoslovakia
