= 15th Politburo =

15th Politburo may refer to:

- 15th Politburo of the Chinese Communist Party
- Politburo of the 15th Congress of the All-Union Communist Party (Bolsheviks)
- 15th Politburo of the Communist Party of Czechoslovakia
