= Wang Gang (politician) =

Chinese politician (born 1942)

- 王刚
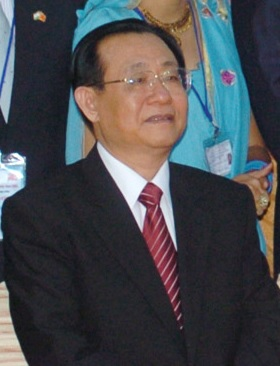
- Wang Gang

Director of the General Office of the Chinese Communist Party
- In office March 1999 – September 2007
- General Secretary: Jiang Zemin; Hu Jintao
- Preceded by: Zeng Qinghong
- Succeeded by: Ling Jihua

Personal details
- Born: October 1942 (age 83) Fuyu, Songyuan, Jilin, Republic of China
- Party: Chinese Communist Party (1971-2013)

Wang Gang (Chinese: 王刚; born October 1942) is a retired Chinese politician. He served in prominent leadership positions in the Chinese Communist Party (CCP) after 1999, including Director of the General Office of the CCP and Secretary of the Secretariat. He was a member of the Politburo from 2007 to 2012.

== Biography ==
Wang was born in Fuyu County, Jilin Province, and graduated from the department of philosophy of Jilin University in 1967. He joined the CCP in June 1971. Between 1977 and 1981 he served on the administrative staff of the Communist Party's regional committee in Xinjiang. Between 1981 and 1985, he was a secretary in the Communist Party's office on managing relations with Taiwan. He was later responsible for the State Bureau for Letters and Calls and the State Archives Administration. Between 1999 and 2001, he became the Director of the General Office of the CCP.

Wang was an alternate of the 15th Central Committee of the CCP, an alternate of the 16th Politburo of the CCP and a Secretary of the Secretariat of the CCP.

He became a full member of the 17th Politburo of the CCP in 2007, joining the inner sanctum of power in the CCP. Between 2008 and 2013, Wang served as one of the Vice Chairmen of the 11th Chinese People's Political Consultative Conference (CPPCC), and the secretary of a working committee of organs directly affiliated with the Central Committee of the CCP.

Wang retired from public life in 2013.

Party political offices
Preceded by Zeng Qinghong	Director of the General Office of the Chinese Communist Party; 1999–2007	Succeeded by Ling Jihua
