= Socialist Concept of Honor and Disgrace =

Chinese Communist Party moral code

Eight honors and eight shames
- Simplified Chinese: 八荣八耻
- Traditional Chinese: 八榮八恥
Transcriptions
Standard Mandarin
- Hanyu Pinyin: Bā róng bā chǐ

Socialist Concepts on honors and Disgraces
- Simplified Chinese: 社会主义荣辱观
- Traditional Chinese: 社會主義榮辱觀
Transcriptions
Standard Mandarin
- Hanyu Pinyin: Shèhuìzhǔyì róngrǔ guān

The Eight honors and Eight Shames or the Eight honors and Disgraces, officially called the Socialist Concept of Honor and Disgrace, is a set of moral concepts developed by former General Secretary Hu Jintao for the citizens of the People's Republic of China. It is also known as Eight Virtues and Shames, or Hu Jintao's Eight-Step Programme.

== History ==
On March 4, 2006, Hu released this list calling it the "new moral yardstick to measure the work, conduct and attitude of Communist Party officials." It is being promulgated as the moral code for all Chinese, especially Chinese Communist Party cadres.

== Translation ==
In October 2006, the Xinhua News Agency posted an English translation of the Socialist Concept of Honor and Disgrace:

| Chinese | English translation |
|---|---|
| 以热爱祖国为荣 以危害祖国为耻 | Honor to those who love the motherland, and shame on those who harm the motherland. |
| 以服务人民为荣 以背离人民为耻 | Honor to those who serve the people, and shame on those who betray the people. |
| 以崇尚科学为荣 以愚昧无知为耻 | Honor to those who quest for science, and shame on those who refuse to be educated. |
| 以辛勤劳动为荣 以好逸恶劳为耻 | Honor to those who are hardworking, and shame on those who indulge in comfort and hate work. |
| 以团结互助为荣 以损人利己为耻 | Honor to those who help each other, and shame on those who seek gains at the expense of others. |
| 以诚实守信为荣 以见利忘义为耻 | Honor to those who are trustworthy, and shame on those who trade integrity for profits. |
| 以遵纪守法为荣 以违法乱纪为耻 | Honor to those who abide by law and discipline, and shame on those who break laws and discipline. |
| 以艰苦奋斗为荣 以骄奢淫逸为耻 | Honor to those who uphold plain living and hard struggle, and shame on those who wallow in extravagance and pleasures. |

== See also ==
- Scientific Development Concept
- Eight Musts
- Honour
- Shame
