= Zou Jiahua =

Chinese politician (1926–2025)

- 邹家华

Vice Premier of China
- In office 8 April 1991 – 17 March 1998 Serving with Zhu Rongji, Qian Qichen, Li Lanqing
- Premier: Li Peng

Member of the 14th Politburo of the Chinese Communist Party
- In office 1992–1997
- General Secretary: Jiang Zemin

Personal details
- Born: 28 September 1926 Shanghai, China
- Died: 16 February 2025 (aged 98) Beijing, China
- Party: Chinese Communist Party
- Spouse: Ye Chumei
- Relations: Ye Jianying (father-in-law)
- Parent: Zou Taofen (father)
- Education: Harbin Institute of Technology; Bauman Moscow State Technical University

Chinese name
- Simplified Chinese: 邹家华
- Traditional Chinese: 鄒家華
Transcriptions
Standard Mandarin
- Hanyu Pinyin: Zōu Jiāhuá
- Wade–Giles: Tsou Chia-hua

Zou Jiahua (28 September 1926 – 16 February 2025) was a high-ranking politician of the People's Republic of China. He served as China's Vice Premier from 1991 to 1998, Vice-chairman of the 9th National People's Congress from 1998 to 2003, and was a member of the Politburo of the Chinese Communist Party from 1992 to 1997.

== Early life and career ==
In 1944, Zou Jiahua joined the New Fourth Army at the age of 18. In 1945, he joined the Chinese Communist Party.

From 1948 to 1955, Zou Jiahua studied first at the Harbin Institute of Technology, then later attended the Bauman Moscow State Technical University School of Mechanical Manufacturing, becoming proficient in Russian. His career, like many others in his generation, centred on industry. Upon his return to China in 1955, Zou worked as an engineer in Shenyang, Liaoning Province, where he worked as the chief engineer then director of the Second Machine Tool Plant. Eventually in 1973, Zou became the Director of the First Ministry of Machine-Building Industry.

== Later career ==
After 1973, Zou began serving in increasingly responsible positions in State Council bodies. In 1988, Zou became head of the State Planning Commission, where he made decisions to hold major conferences for the integration of Guangxi Province as well as for initiatives for the establishment of regional economic zones. Zou was widely considered a strong proponent of central planning, and was quoted saying that "market mechanisms must take a backseat to economic planning." However, beginning in early 1992 he publicly echoed Deng Xiaoping's efforts to revive reform; as seen in an early 1992 speech where he praised Guangdong Province's accomplishments in the reform and opening up and high economic growth.

From 1991 to 1998, Zou served as the vice premier of China, and was one of China's point men for negotiations with the west. In 1994, he travelled in Canada and the United States and with then American president Bill Clinton to discuss issues of trade and human rights. As Vice Premier, Zou also visited Japan, the United Kingdom, Italy, Spain, Netherlands, and Germany; and the United States in 1986. He also played an important role in China's early efforts to acquire foreign military technology.

From 1992 to 1997, Zou served as a member of the 14th Central Committee of the Chinese Communist Party and Politburo of China. He was an alternate member of the 11th Central Committee of the Chinese Communist Party and a member of the 12th, 13th, and 14th CCP Central Committees. He was a member of the Politburo of the 14th CCP Central Committee. In March 1998, Zou was elected vice-chairman of the 9th National People's Congress Standing Committee. Zou retired from politics in March 2003.

== Personal life ==
=== Family ===
- His father, Zou Taofen (邹韬奋; 1895–1944) was a well-known intellectual, journalist, and political commentator in Shanghai in the 1930s.
- His wife, Ye Chumei (叶楚梅) is the daughter of Ye Jianying.
- His brother, Zou Jingmeng (邹竞蒙; 1929–1999) was head of the China Meteorological Administration and president of the World Meteorological Organization. In 1999, Zou Jingmeng was murdered in Beijing during a robbery.

=== Death ===
Zou died in Beijing on 16 February 2025, at the age of 98.

== Career data ==
Year(s)	Information
1999	Member, Macao SAR Preparatory Committee, Government Delegation, Macao Hand-Over Ceremony
1998–2003	Vice-chairman, 9th NPC Standing Committee
1997–2002	Delegate, 15th CCP, National Congress
1996–????	Head, State Leading Group for Information
1993–1998	Member, 8th National People's Congress
1992–1997	Member, 14th CCP Central Committee, Politburo
1991–1998	Vice-Premier, State Council
1989–1993	Chairman, National Development and Reform Commission
1988–1989	Minister, Ministry of Machinery and Electronics Industry
1987–1992	Member, 13th CCP Central Committee
1986–1988	Minister-in-Charge, State Machine-Building Industry Commission
1982–1987	Member, 12th CCP Central Committee
1982–1985	Vice-Minister, State Administration for Science, Technology and Industry for National Defence (SASTIND)
1977–1982	Alternate Member, 11th CCP Central Committee
1973–1982	Director, First Ministry of Machine-Building Industry, Machine Tool Research Institute
1973–1982	Secretary, First Ministry of Machine-Building Industry, Machine Tool Research Institute CCP, Party Committee
1973–1982	Deputy Director, Office of National Defense Industry, Director, No.2 Machine Tool Plant Liaoning Province, Shenyang City
1955–????	Chief Engineer, No.2 Machine Tool Plant Liaoning Province, Shenyang City
1945	Joined, Chinese Communist Party
1944	Joined, People's Liberation Army (New Fourth Army)
