= 17th Politburo =

17th Politburo may refer to:

- 17th Politburo of the Chinese Communist Party
- Politburo of the 17th Congress of the All-Union Communist Party (Bolsheviks)
- 17th Politburo of the Communist Party of Czechoslovakia
