= 14th Politburo =

14th Politburo may refer to:

- 14th Politburo of the Chinese Communist Party
- Politburo of the 14th Congress of the All-Union Communist Party (Bolsheviks)
- 14th Politburo of the Communist Party of Czechoslovakia
- 14th Politburo of the Romanian Communist Party
- 14th Politburo of the Communist Party of Czechoslovakia
- 14th Politburo of the Hungarian Socialist Workers' Party
