= Xie Fei (politician) =

Chinese politician (1932–1999)

Xie Fei (Chinese: 谢非; pinyin: Xiè Fēi; Jyutping: Ze Fei; November 4, 1932 – October 27, 1999) was a Chinese politician. He was best known for his term as the Chinese Communist Party Committee Secretary of Guangdong between 1991 and 1998, as a member of the Politburo of the Chinese Communist Party, and as Vice Chairman of the Standing Committee of the National People's Congress.

== Biography ==
Xie, a Hakka, was born in Hekou Town, Lufeng County, Guangdong Province to Li Chun (1896-2009). He secretly participated in the Chinese Communist Party's activities in 1947, and joined Chinese Communist Party in July 1949. In 1955, he was appointed as a member of CCP's Lufeng County Standing Committee, and the director of its propaganda department. He was later promoted to party secretary of Lufeng. He was transferred to journal Shangyou as an editor in 1960. His following appointments included fellow in office of policy research in CCP's central south bureau, vice director of political office in Guangdong Revolutionary Committee, vice director in department of politics in scientific and educational province Guangdong, and vice director of office of culture and education province Guangdong.

In 1976, he became one of the three leaders of the journal Red Flag. He was appointed as vice secretary general as well as director of the general office of the Guangdong Provincial Committee of the Chinese Communist Party in 1979. He was promoted to secretary-general and president of party school in Guangdong in 1983. Xie became party chief of Guangzhou in 1986, and then promoted to Guangdong provincial party chief in 1991. He was a member of the Politburo of the Chinese Communist Party from 1992 to 1998. From March 1998, he became vice chairman of standing committee of National People's Congress as well as a politburo member.

He was an alternate member of 12th Central Committee of the Chinese Communist Party, and a full member of 13th-15th Central Committees, and a member of the 14th and 15th Politburo. He died while still in office as a Politburo member. He was the only member of the 15th Politburo to have died while still holding his seat. The next Politburo member to die before the end of his term was Huang Ju in 2007. Xie is also, as of 2016, the most recent Guangdong party chief to have been born in Guangdong province.

He died on October 27, 1999, in Guangzhou, at the age of 66.

Political offices
Preceded by Lin Ruo	Secretary of CCP Guangdong Committee; 1991–1998	Succeeded by Li Changchun
