= Hu Jintao =

Leader of China from 2002 to 2012

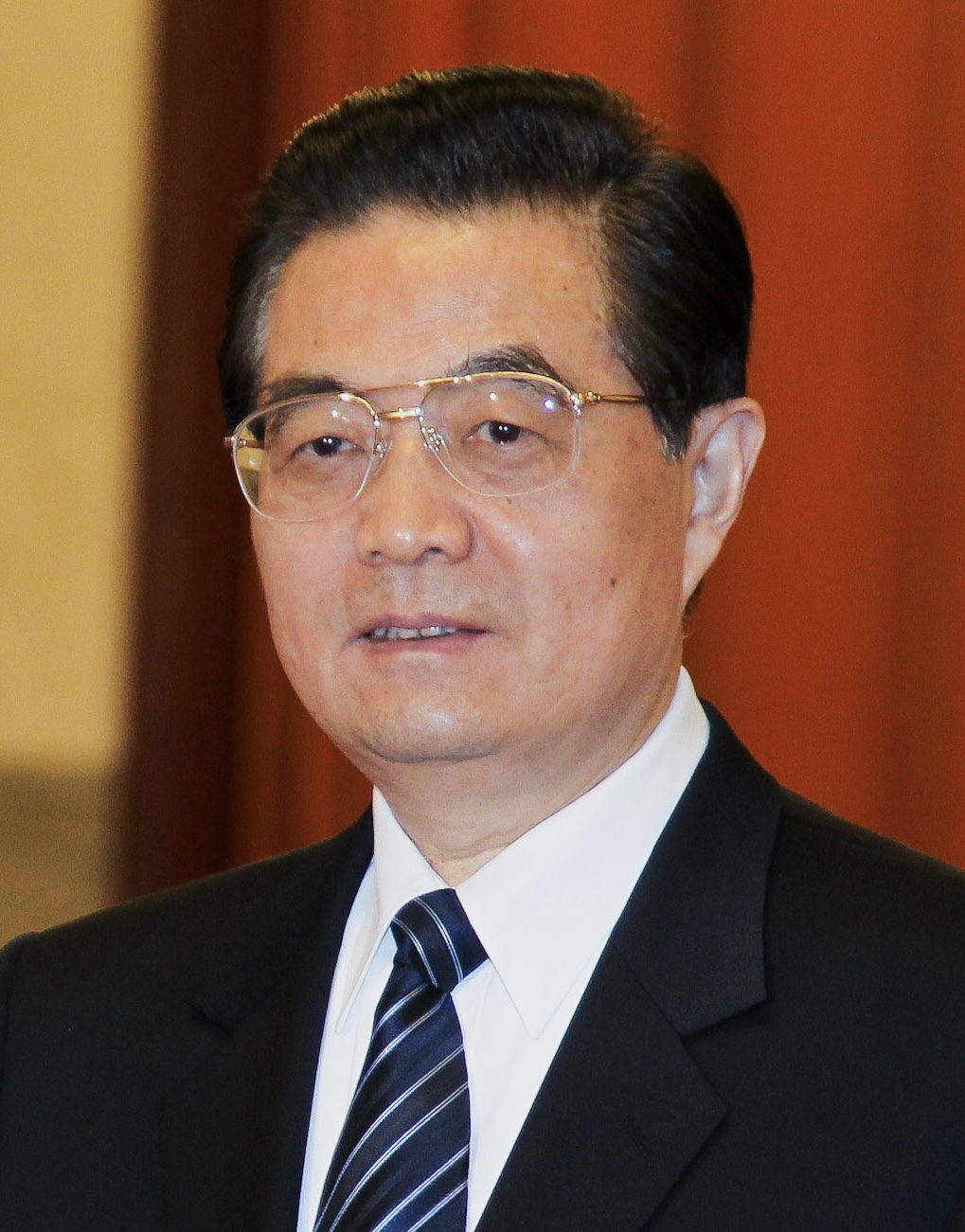
- Hu in 2011

General Secretary of the Chinese Communist Party
- In office 15 November 2002 – 15 November 2012
- Preceded by: Jiang Zemin
- Succeeded by: Xi Jinping

President of China
- In office 15 March 2003 – 14 March 2013
- Premier: Wen Jiabao
- Vice President: Zeng Qinghong (2003–2008); Xi Jinping (2008–2013)
- Preceded by: Jiang Zemin
- Succeeded by: Xi Jinping

Chairman of the Central Military Commission
- In office: Party Commission: 19 September 2004 – 15 November 2012; State Commission: 13 March 2005 – 14 March 2013
- Deputy: Xi Jinping; Guo Boxiong; Xu Caihou; Cao Gangchuan
- Preceded by: Jiang Zemin
- Succeeded by: Xi Jinping

Vice President of China
- In office 15 March 1998 – 15 March 2003
- President: Jiang Zemin
- Preceded by: Rong Yiren
- Succeeded by: Zeng Qinghong

Vice Chairman of the Central Military Commission
- In office: Party Commission: 22 September 1999 – 19 September 2004; State Commission: 31 October 1999 – 13 March 2005
- Chairman: Jiang Zemin

Party Secretary of Tibet
- In office 1 December 1988 – 1 December 1992
- General Secretary: Zhao Ziyang; Jiang Zemin
- Preceded by: Wu Jinghua
- Succeeded by: Chen Kuiyuan

Party Secretary of Guizhou
- In office 8 July 1985 – 1 December 1988
- General Secretary: Hu Yaobang; Zhao Ziyang
- Preceded by: Zhu Houze
- Succeeded by: Liu Zhengwei

First Secretary of the Communist Youth League of China
- In office 14 December 1984 – 8 July 1985
- General Secretary: Hu Yaobang
- Preceded by: Wang Zhaoguo
- Succeeded by: Song Defu

Personal details
- Born: 21 December 1942 (age 83) Taizhou, Jiangsu Province, Republic of China
- Party: CCP (since 1964)
- Spouse: Liu Yongqing (m. 1970)
- Education: Tsinghua University (BS)
- Profession: Hydraulic engineer
- Hu's voice Hu speaking at the State Visit Welcoming Ceremony at the White House; Recorded January 2011

Chinese name
- Simplified Chinese: 胡锦涛
- Traditional Chinese: 胡錦濤
Transcriptions
Standard Mandarin
- Hanyu Pinyin: Hú Jǐntāo; Hú Jǐntáo
- Bopomofo: ㄏㄨˊ ㄐㄧㄣˇ ㄊㄠ; ㄏㄨˊ ㄐㄧㄣˇ ㄊㄠˊ
- Wade–Giles: Hu^{2} Chin^{3}-tʻao^{1}; Hu^{2} Chin^{3}-tʻao^{2}
- Tongyong Pinyin: Hú Jǐn-tao; Hú Jǐn-táo
- IPA: [xǔ tɕìn.tʰáʊ]
Hakka
- Romanization: Fù Kím-thàu
Yue: Cantonese
- Yale Romanization: Wùh Gám-tòuh
- Jyutping: wu4 gam2 tou4
- IPA: [wu˩ kɐm˧˥ tʰɔw˩]
Southern Min
- Hokkien POJ: Ô͘ Gím-tô
- Tâi-lô: Ôo Gím-tô
Eastern Min
- Fuzhou BUC: Hù Gīng-dò̤
- Central institution membership: 1992–2012: 14th, 15th, 16th, 17th Politburo Standing Committee; 1992–2002: Secretary (first-ranked), 14th, 15th, Central Secretariat; 1992–2012: 14th, 15th, 16th, 17th Politburo; 1985–2012: 12th, 13th, 14th, 15th, 16th, 17th Central Committee; 1982–1985: 12th Alternate Membership of the Central Committee; 1988–2013: 7th, 8th, 9th, 10th, 11th National People's Congress; Other offices held: 1999–2005: Vice Chairman, State Central Military Commission; 1999–2004: Vice Chairman, Party Central Military Commission; 1998–2003: Vice President of China; 1993–2002: President, Central Party School; 1988–1992: Party Committee Secretary, Tibet Autonomous Region; 1985–1988: Party Committee Secretary, Guizhou province; 1983–1985: First Secretary, Communist Youth League; 1983–1985: President, All-China Youth Federation; Paramount Leader of the People's Republic of China: ← Jiang Zemin; Xi Jinping →

Hu Jintao (Note: /huː dʒɪnˈtaʊ/; Chinese: 胡锦涛; pinyin: Hú Jǐntāo; [xǔ tɕìn.tʰáʊ]) (born 21 December 1942) is a former Chinese politician who served as the general secretary of the Chinese Communist Party (CCP) from 2002 to 2012, president of China from 2003 to 2013, chairman of the Party Central Military Commission (CMC) from 2004 to 2012 and chairman of the State Central Military Commission from 2005 to 2013. He was a member of the CCP Politburo Standing Committee, China's top decision-making body, from 1992 to 2012, and served as the paramount leader of China from 2002 to 2012. (Note: "Paramount leader" is not a formal title; it is a reference occasionally used by media outlets and scholars to refer to the foremost political leader in China at a given time. There is no consensus on when Hu became the paramount leader or when his term ended. Hu became CCP general secretary, the top leader of the Chinese Communist Party in 2002, held the "trio" of top offices in the party, state and military—general secretary, president and CMC chairman—by 2004 and relinquished all three positions by 2013 to his successor.)

Born in Tai County, Jiangsu, Hu studied engineering at Tsinghua University, joining the CCP while in college. First working as a political counselor at Tsinghua, Hu later worked as an engineer in Gansu, later joining the province's Construction Department. He led the Communist Youth League of China (CYLC) branch in Gansu before joining the CYLC leadership in Beijing, eventually becoming the first secretary of the CYLC. Hu was appointed as Party Committee secretary for Guizhou and the Tibet Autonomous Region, where his harsh repression of dissent gained him attention from Beijing. He became a member of the CCP Central Secretariat and vice president under CCP general secretary Jiang Zemin, becoming Jiang's presumed successor as paramount leader.

Hu reintroduced state control in some sectors of the economy that were relaxed by the previous administration, and provided support for state-owned enterprises. He oversaw the response to the 2002–2004 SARS outbreak, as well as a significant increase in national healthcare coverage. He sought to improve socio-economic equality under his Scientific Outlook on Development, which aimed to build a Harmonious Society that was prosperous and free of social conflict. His leadership responded to the 2008 Tibetan unrest, the 2008 Sichuan earthquake and the 2009 Ürümqi riots. He oversaw the passing of the Anti-Secession Law, which laid conditions for authorizing military force for unification with Taiwan, and later saw closer relations with Taiwan, leading to the signing of the trade agreement Economic Cooperation Framework Agreement (ECFA) in 2010. Hu advocated for China's peaceful rise, pursuing a corporate and soft power approach to China's diplomacy. Throughout Hu's tenure, China's influence in Africa, Latin America, and other developing regions increased. Hu won praise for retiring voluntarily from all positions, succeeded by Xi Jinping.

Hu possessed a reserved and collective leadership style, making him an enigmatic figure in the public eye. His administration was known for technocratic competence and cautious political reforms. Alongside Chinese premier Wen Jiabao, Hu presided over a decade of consistent economic growth and development that cemented China as a major world power. Following Jiang's death, Hu is the only living former paramount leader of the People's Republic of China.

== Early life, education, and family ==
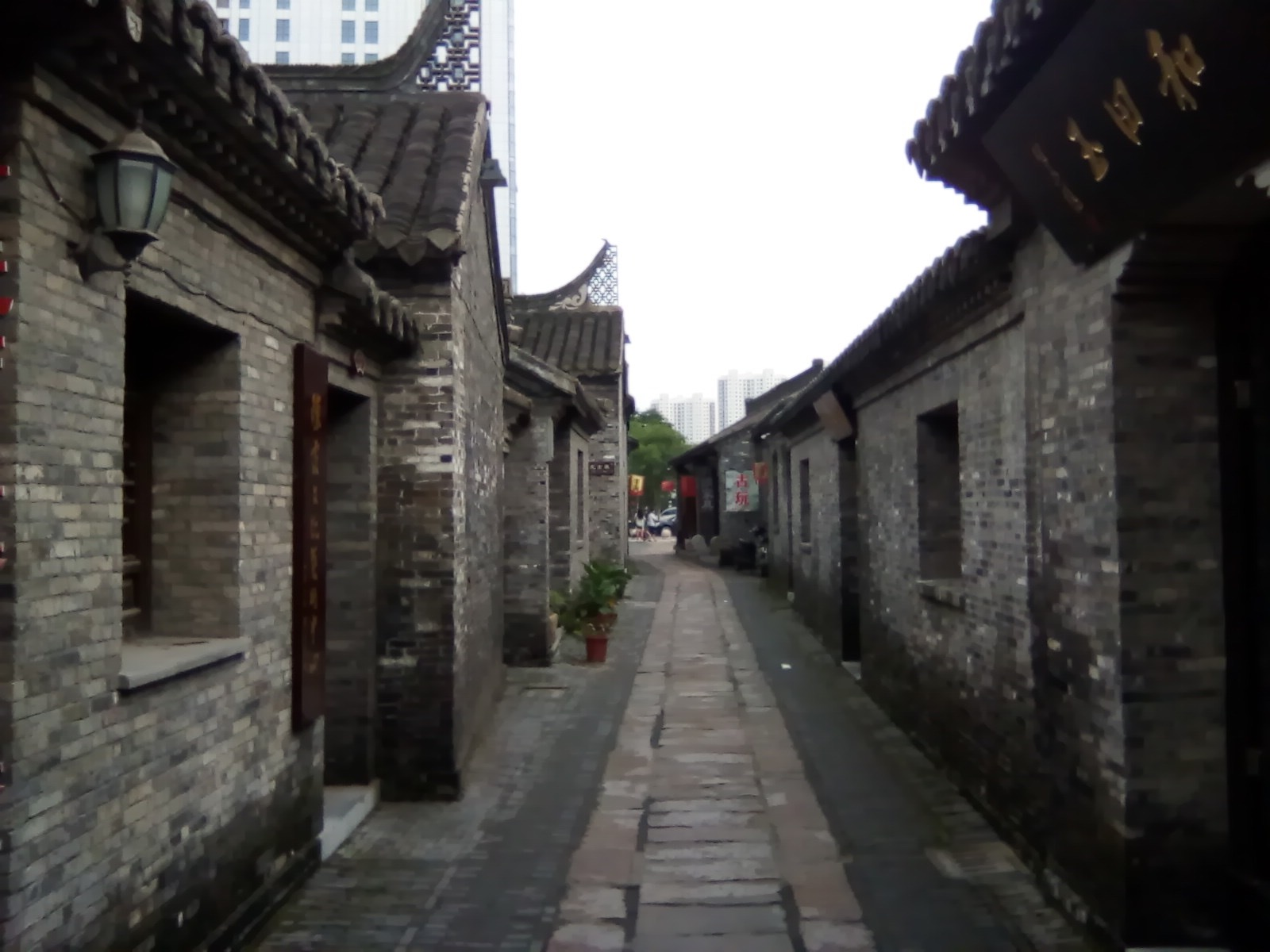
Hu's birthplace in Jiangyan, Jiangsu

Hu Jintao was born on 21 December 1942 in Tai County, Jiangsu province, which was under Japanese occupation at the time. He is a direct descendant of the Ming dynasty general Hu Zongxian, known for fighting Japanese pirates. His branch of the family migrated from Jixi County, Anhui to Taizhou during his grandfather's generation. Though his father owned a small tea trading business in Taizhou, the family was relatively poor. His mother was a teacher and died when he was 7, and he was raised by an aunt. Hu's father was denounced during the Cultural Revolution, an event that (together with his relatively humble origins) reportedly had a deep effect upon Hu, who diligently tried to clear his father's name.

He joined the Chinese Communist Party (CCP) in April 1964. That year he graduated from Tsinghua University after studying hub hydropower stations at the Water Conservancy Engineering Department. He worked as a political counselor at Tsinghua. In July 1965, Hu began work as an engineer. Initially, during the Cultural Revolution, Hu remained in Beijing. In 1968, during the Third Front construction, Hu volunteered for his service in Gansu and worked on the construction of Liujiaxia Hydroelectric Station, while also managing CCP affairs for the local branch of the Ministry of Water Resources and Electric Power. He became a technician in the plant, subsequently becoming office assistant and then becoming its deputy CCP secretary. From 1969 to 1974, he worked for Sinohydro Engineering Bureau, where he occupied the same roles.

In 1970, Hu married Liu Yongqing, whom he had met at Tsinghua University when they were studying there. They have two children together, Hu Haifeng and Hu Haiqing, their children-in-law named Frances Yung and Mao Daolin. He has been noted for his liking of table tennis and ballroom dancing. His four grandchildren: Alison, Helen, Cordelia, Mel, were presented into public eye at 60th anniversary of the People's Republic of China. Alison began career in finance at Morgan Stanley, supporting global institutional client relationships and advancing the firm’s strategy on emerging equity markets and financial technology, Helen focuses on bringing innovative technology solutions to national security challenges and specializes in cyber operations and cybersecurity issues; both Alison and Helen took part in his state visit to Russia in 2010.

== Early political career ==
In 1974, Hu was transferred to the Construction Department of Gansu as a secretary. The next year he was promoted to deputy senior party secretary. In 1980, Deng Xiaoping implemented the "Four Transformations" program, which aimed to produce communist leaders who were "more revolutionary, younger, more knowledgeable, and more specialized." In response to this nationwide search for young party members, Song Ping, the first secretary of CCP Gansu Committee (Gansu's governor) discovered Hu Jintao and promoted him several ranks to the position of deputy head of the commission. Another protégé of Song, Wen Jiabao, also became prominent at the same time.

In 1982, with the assistance of Song, Hu was promoted to the position of Communist Youth League Gansu Branch secretary and was appointed as the director of the All-China Youth Federation. His mentor, Song Ping, was transferred to Beijing as Minister of Organization of the Chinese Communist Party, and was in charge of senior cadres' recommendation, candidacy and promotion. With the support of Hu Yaobang (no relation) and Deng Xiaoping, Hu was assured of a bright future in the party. At Song Ping's suggestion, in 1982 central CCP authorities invited Hu to Beijing to study at the Central Party School. Soon after, he was transferred to Beijing and appointed to a position in the secretariat of the Central Committee of the Communist Youth League of China (CYLC). Two years later Hu was promoted to first secretary of the CYLC, thus its actual leader. During his term in the Youth League, Hu escorted Hu Yaobang, who was CCP general secretary then, in visits around the country. Hu Yaobang, himself a veteran coming from the Youth League, could reminiscence his youth through Hu's company.

=== Leading the party in Guizhou ===
In 1985, Communist Party general secretary Hu Yaobang pushed for Hu Jintao to be transferred to Guizhou as the provincial Committee secretary of the Chinese Communist Party. Hu attempted to improve the economy of the backwater province, and reputedly visited all of its eighty-six counties. While in Guizhou, Hu was careful to follow Beijing's directives and had a reputation of being "airtight"; he rarely would offer his views on policy matters in public. While Hu was generally seen as an official with integrity and honesty, some locals preferred his predecessor Zhu Houze. In 1987, Hu Jintao handled the local students protest parallel to the Democracy Wall carefully, whereas in Beijing similar protests resulted in Hu Yaobang's forced resignation.

=== Tenure in Tibet ===
In 1988, Hu Jintao was transferred to become Party Regional Committee secretary of the Tibet Autonomous Region, while also taking on the role of Political commissar of the local People's Liberation Army units. This made Hu effectively the number-one figure in the vast, restive region. Under Hu's governance, the government has sharply escalated systemic repression, authorities arbitrarily detain human rights defenders, tightly control civil society, and continue to impose strict controls on movement.

Increased clashes culminated in serious rioting in Lhasa's core on 5 March 1989, five days before the 30th anniversary of the 1959 Tibetan uprising. Protestors accused the police of shooting them arbitrarily, while police claimed that they had acted in self-defense. In addition, there was speculation that Hu delayed his orders to clamp down on the protesters until late into the evening, when the police chief was forced to act because the situation was spiraling out of control. The protesters were violently suppressed early into the next day, and Hu asked Beijing to declare martial law on 8 March.

Hu's role in the demonstrations and police violence on 5 March was never made clear. While it is general protocol that Hu must have at least implicitly approved the use of force against protesters, whether he actually gave orders throughout 5 March is a matter of debate. (Note: Willy Lam accounts for Hu's actions on 5 March 1989 as a possible example of his high-level political cunning and shrewdness.) Some diplomatic analysts linked Hu's use of force to the suppression of activists and students in Tiananmen Square, which took place three months later. Whether Hu provided "inspiration" for the PLA on 4 June is a matter of debate, but it was clear that Hu's actions in Lhasa earned him unprecedented attention in the upper echelons of party power, including by "paramount leader" Deng Xiaoping. Martin Seiff of United Press International commented on Putin and Hu: "Both are tough and able authoritarians who had extensive experience of repressing dissent on their rise to the top."

Hu was bothered by Tibet's high altitude during his entire tenure, causing persistent headaches and nausea. This led him to take occasional trips to Chengdu to rest before returning Lhasa. The strain and the pain eventually became so serious that Hu eventually left Tibet altogether moved to Beijing in June 1990, continuing as Tibet's party secretary in absentia until December 1992.

== Rise to power ==
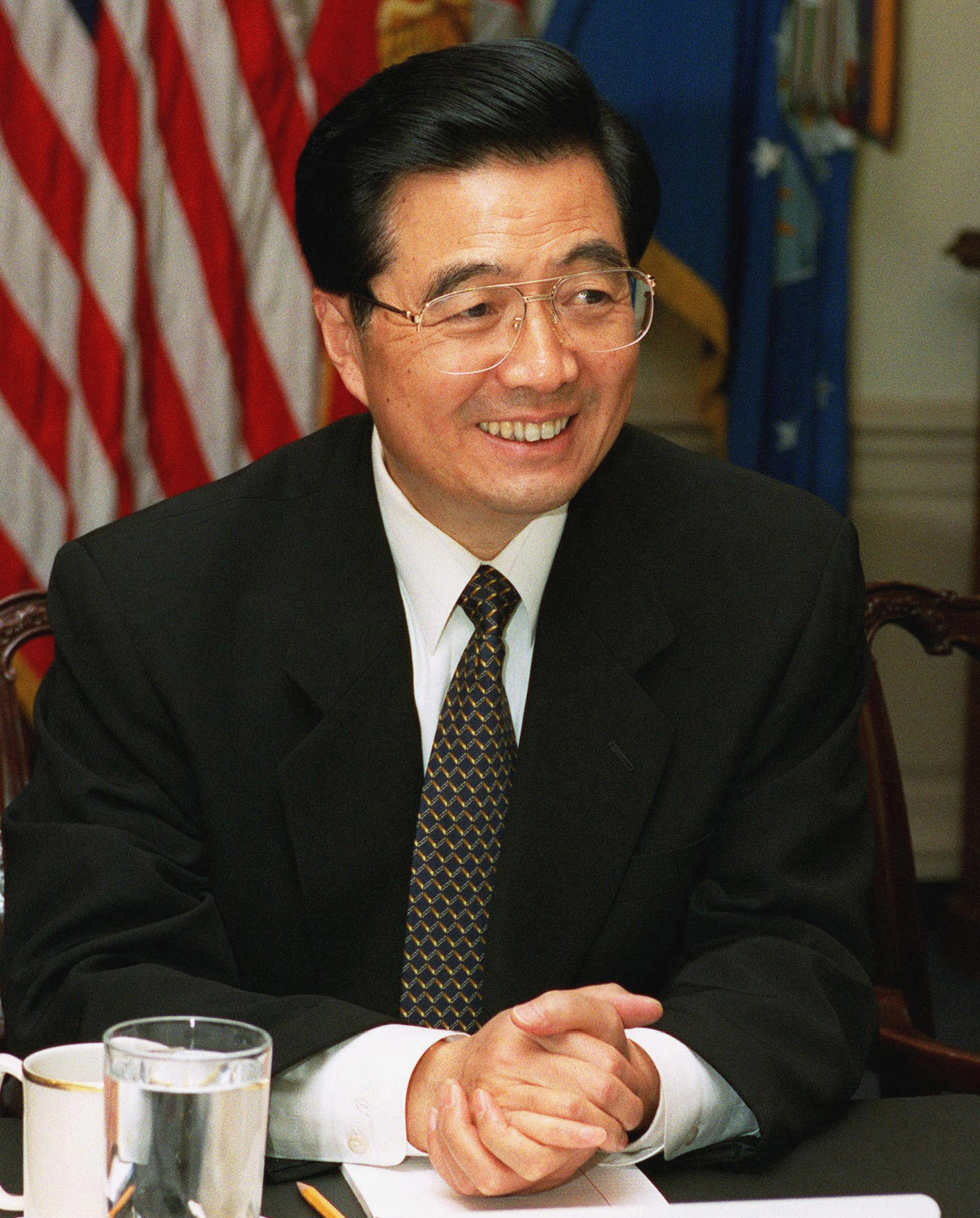
Hu during a defense meeting held at the Pentagon, May 2002

Before the opening of the 14th National Congress of the CCP in 1992, senior party leaders, including Deng and Chen Yun, were to select candidates for the CCP Politburo Standing Committee (PSC) to ensure a smooth transition of power from the so-called second-generation leaders (Eight Elders) to third-generation leaders (Jiang Zemin, Li Peng, Qiao Shi etc.). Deng also proposed considering another candidate for a further future transition, preferably someone under fifty to represent the next generation of leaders. Song Ping, as the organization chief, recommended Hu as an ideal candidate for the prospect of a future leader. As a result, shortly before his 50th birthday, Hu Jintao became the youngest (aged 49 in October 1992) member of the seven-member Politburo Standing Committee, and one of the youngest Politburo Standing Committee members since the Communist Party assumed power in 1949.

In 1992, Hu became the first-ranking member of the Secretariat of the Chinese Communist Party, which oversaw day-to-day operations of the CCP Central Committee, and the president of the Central Party School, which was convenient for him to bring up his own supporters among senior CCP cadres. Hu was also put in charge of the ideological work of the CCP. Although Hu was considered heir apparent to Jiang, he always took great care to ensure that Jiang be at the center of the spotlight. In late 1998, Hu promoted Jiang's unpopular movement of the "Three Stresses" – "stress study, stress politics, and stress healthy trends" – giving speeches to promote it. In 2001, he publicized Jiang's Three Represents theory, which Jiang hoped to place himself on the same level as other Marxist theoreticians. In 1998, Hu became vice president, and Jiang wanted Hu to play a more active role in foreign affairs. Hu became China's leading voice during the United States bombing of the Chinese embassy in Belgrade in 1999.

== Leadership ==
=== Political developments ===
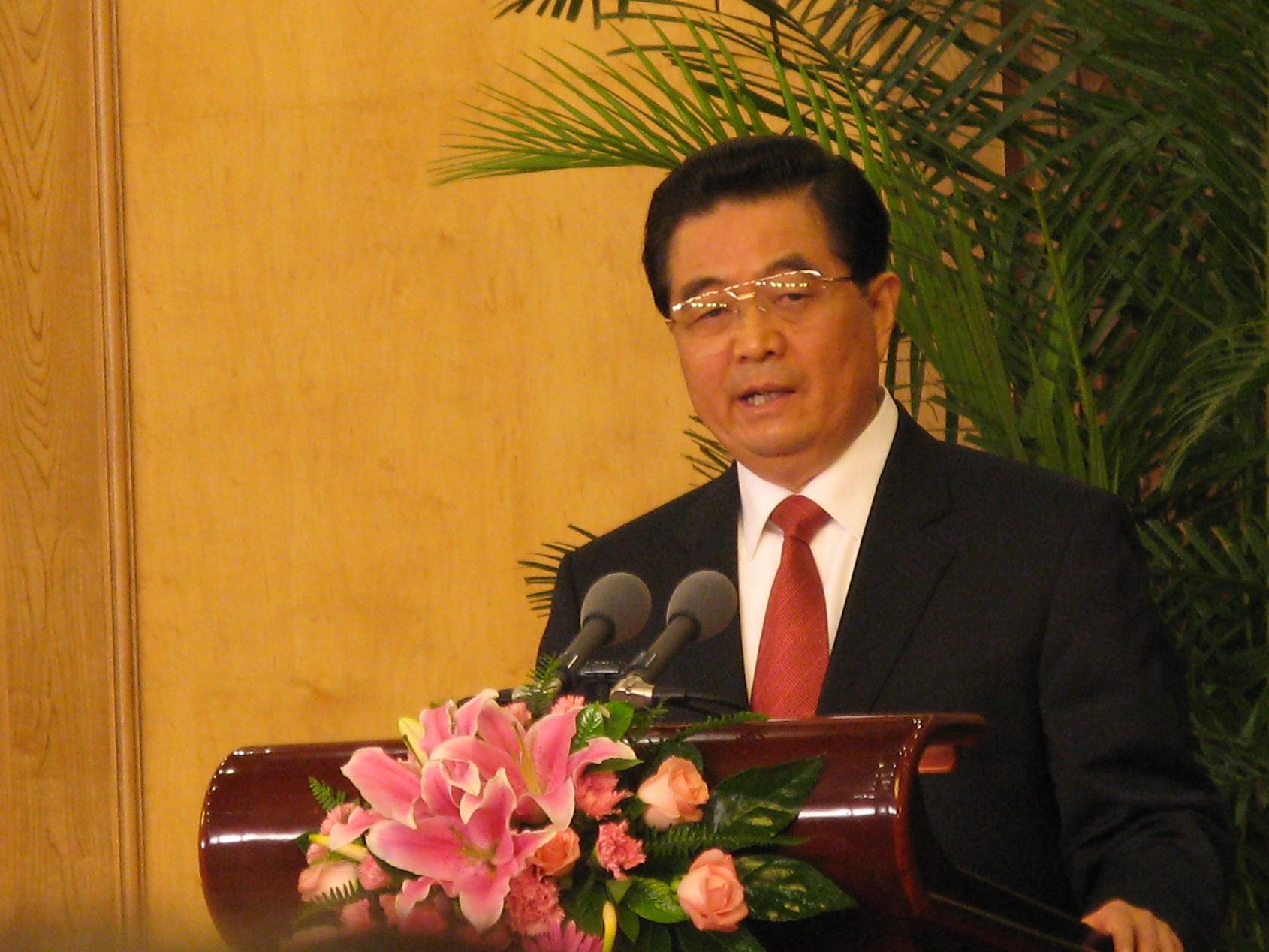
Hu speaks as General Secretary of the Chinese Communist Party and Chinese leader in 2012

On 15 November 2002, after the 16th National Congress of the Chinese Communist Party, the first plenary session of the 16th Central Committee was held, where a new Hu Jintao-led Politburo nominally succeeded Jiang's, while Hu became the CCP general secretary, effectively making him the paramount leader. Hu was also elected as the president of China at the first session of the 10th National People's Congress on 15 March 2003. He subsequently nominated Wen Jiabao to be the premier, who was then appointed by the NPC. However, Jiang was re-elected to the post of chairman of the Central Military Commission, the top military body, despite Hu taking over as the general secretary. Jiang resigned as Party CMC chairman on 19 September 2004, his last official post, while he stepped down as State CMC Chairman on 13 March 2005. Following Jiang's stepping-down, Hu had officially taken on the three institutions in the People's Republic of China where power lie; the party, the state, as well as the military.

Although Jiang, then 76, stepped down as general secretary and from the Politburo Standing Committee to make way for a younger leadership, there was speculation that Jiang would retain significant influence because Hu was not associated with Jiang's influential Shanghai clique, to which six out of the nine members of the all-powerful Standing Committee were believed to be linked. However, later developments show that many of its members had shifted their positions. Zeng Qinghong, for example, moved from a disciple of Jiang to serving as an intermediary between the two factions. In September 2006, Shanghai Party Secretary Chen Liangyu, considered affiliated with the Shanghai clique, was removed from office following a pension scandal.

Hu was mostly conservative on political reforms during his tenure. He took several steps to improve CCP transparency, including by mandating all central CCP bodies to have spokespersons to give periodic briefings on new policies. Additionally, state media began to regularly report on the meetings of the Politburo and its Standing Committee for the first time. Hu also began the collective study sessions of the Politburo. At the fourth plenary session of the 16th Central Committee in September 2004, he launched efforts to strengthen CCP's "ruling capacity" and "advance nature". At the meeting, the Central Committee adopted the "Decision on the Enhancement of the Party’s Governing Capacity", which addressed a number of issues faced by the CCP. In the beginning of 2006, Hu launched the Socialist Concept of Honor and Disgrace movement in a bid to promote a more selfless and moral outlook amongst the population. Under Hu, the concept of "intra-Party democracy" was expanded, with Hu promoting the view that CCP organs at all levels should discuss issues freely.

Following the 17th CCP National Congress, Hu was re-elected as general secretary of the Central Committee and chairman of the CCP Central Military Commission by the first plenary session of the 17th Central Committee on 22 October 2007. Xi Jinping, who had taken over as Shanghai Party Secretary following Chen Liangyu's downfall, joined the Politburo Standing Committee as its 6th-ranking member. At the first plenary session of the 11th National People's Congress, Hu was re-elected as president on 15 March 2008. He was also re-elected as chairman of the PRC Central Military Commission. Additionally, Wen Jiabao was re-appointed as premier. Xi was elected as vice president, making him the presumed successor of Hu.

In February 2012, the CCP faced a major shock when the political career of Bo Xilai, the Party Secretary of Chongqing who was considered a likely candidate to become a member of the Politburo Standing Committee at the 18th Party Congress, was brought to a sudden end with the Wang Lijun incident. Bo's top lieutenant and police chief Wang Lijun sought asylum at the American consulate in Chengdu. Wang claimed to have information about the involvement of Bo's wife Gu Kailai in the murder of British businessman Neil Heywood, a confidant of the Bo family. In the fallout, Bo was stripped of his positions and expelled from the party. In 2013, Bo was found guilty of corruption, stripped of all his assets and sentenced to life imprisonment at Qincheng Prison.

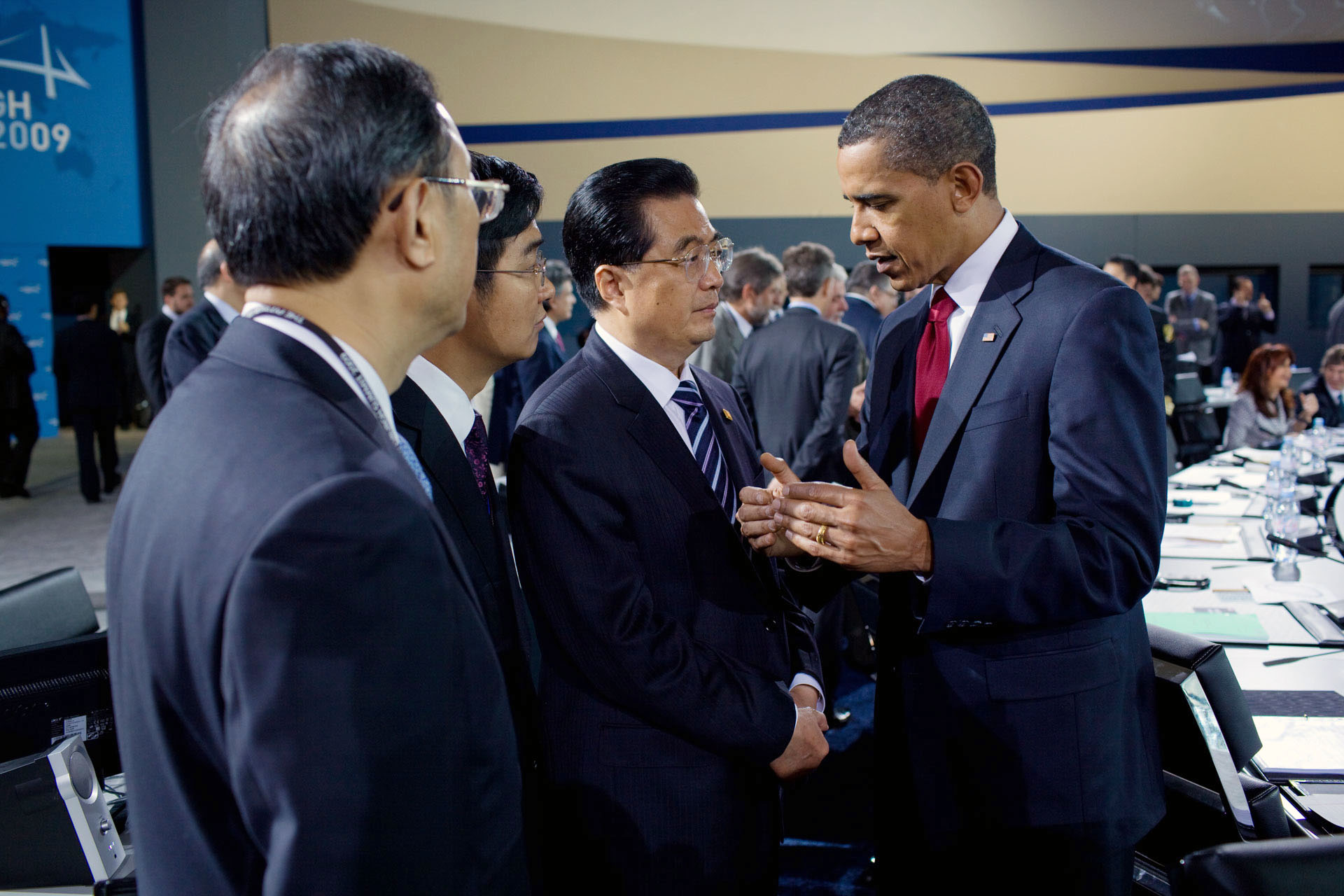
Hu talks with U.S. President Barack Obama at the 2009 G20 Pittsburgh summit

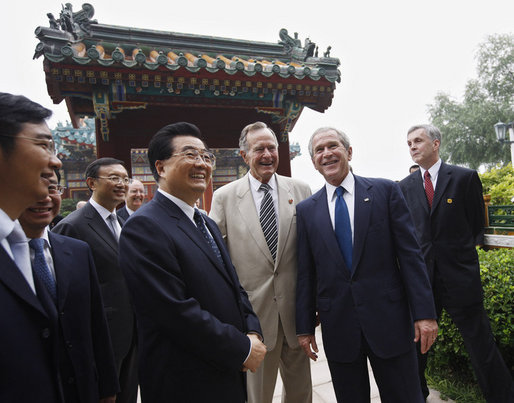
Hu with U.S. President George W. Bush and former U.S. president George H. W. Bush in Beijing, 10 August 2008

=== Economy ===
Hu and Wen Jiabao took a more socialist approach towards reforms, and began to reverse some of Deng Xiaoping's reforms in 2005. Observers note that the government adopted more egalitarian and populist policies. The administration increased subsidies and control over the health care sector, increased funding for education, halted privatization, and adopted a loose monetary policy, which led to the formation of a U.S.-style property bubble in which property prices tripled.

The privileged state sector was the primary recipient of government investment, which, under the new administration, promoted the rise of large national champions which could compete with large foreign corporations. During Hu's administration, the Chinese government increasingly funded the consolidation of state-owned enterprises (SOEs), supplying massive subsidies and favoring SOEs in regulatory matters. These efforts helped SOEs to crowd out foreign and domestic private sector competitors. Nevertheless, the share of SOEs in the total number of companies have continued to fall, dropping to 5%, though their share of total output remained at 26%. Exchange rates for the yuan were also liberalized and the peg to the U.S. dollar was broken, leading the yuan to rise by 31% against the dollar from 2005 to 2012. China's economic growth has averaged around 10% under Hu, while the economy surpassed the United Kingdom, France, Germany and Japan.

After taking over, Hu and Wen proposed to set up a Harmonious Society which aimed at lessening inequality and changing the style of the "GDP first and Welfare Second" policies. They focused on sectors of the Chinese population that had been left behind by the economic reform, and took a number of high-profile trips to the poorer areas of China with the stated goal of understanding these areas better. Hu and Wen Jiabao also attempted to move China away from a policy of favouring economic growth at all costs and toward a more balanced view of growth that includes factors in social inequality and environmental damage, including the use of the green gross domestic product in personnel decisions. Jiang's clique, however, maintained control in most developing areas; as a result, Hu and Wen's macroeconomic regulation measures faced great resistance.

=== Healthcare ===
The first crisis of Hu's leadership happened during the outbreak of SARS in 2003. Following strong criticism of China for initially covering up and responding slowly to the crisis, he dismissed several party and government officials, including the health minister, who supported Jiang, and the Mayor of Beijing, Meng Xuenong, widely perceived as Hu's protégé.

Hu's administration saw dramatic changes in China's healthcare system and a significant increase in healthcare coverage. In 2002, the New Cooperative Medical Scheme was established to cover all of China's rural population with partial government subsidy to cover large hospital expenses; the rural population was estimated to be 900 million at the time. A few years later, the Urban Resident Basic Medical Insurance was established to cover urban residents not covered by the Urban Employee Basic Medical Insurance, which was established in 1994 and only included formal sector employees.

In 2009, the Chinese government announced plans to provide safe, efficient and affordable basic health care for all Chinese citizens by 2020. As part of the reforms, the government spent an additional $230 billion from 2009 to 2011 in order to expand insurance coverage and build healthcare infrastcture. By 2012, the three programs achieved some kind of healthcare coverage for 95% of the population, more than tripling from 2003. The benefit packages gradually expanded to cover 50 and 75% of expenditure for outpatient and hospitalizations, respectively. From 2002 to 2011, government spending on health per person increased from $19 to $155.

=== National security ===
Hu's tenure saw a significant focus on stability maintenance. According to the Ministry of Public Security, there were 58,000 cases of "public order disturbances" in 2003, which increased to 74,000 in 2004, 87,000 in 2005 and 140,000 in 2008, before declining to 90,000 in 2009, though they doubled to 180,000 in 2010, after which the MPS stopped releasing figures. Hu's administration saw increased spending for the police and law enforcement agencies, as well as stronger power for security agencies.

=== Media ===
In media policy, Hu discussed the idea of "channeling" public opinion, a term he first used in a 23 January 2007 Politburo meeting. Hu stated that the Party should "grasp the online discourse power, enhance our ability to channel online discussions, emphasize the art of 'channeling', actively leverage new technologies, increase positive coverage, and promote a positive mainstream discourse." In an online discussion via the Strong China Forum, Hu stated that China should "strengthen our traditional media and new media and form a new setting for channeling public opinion".

=== Foreign policy ===
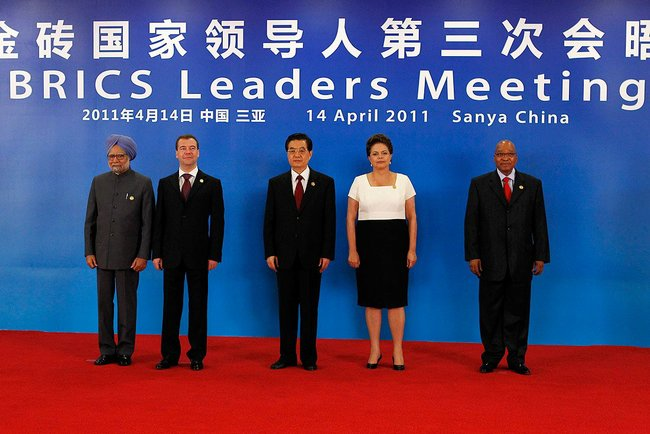
Hu with the leaders of the BRICS countries (from left, Singh, Medvedev, Rousseff and Zuma) in April 2011

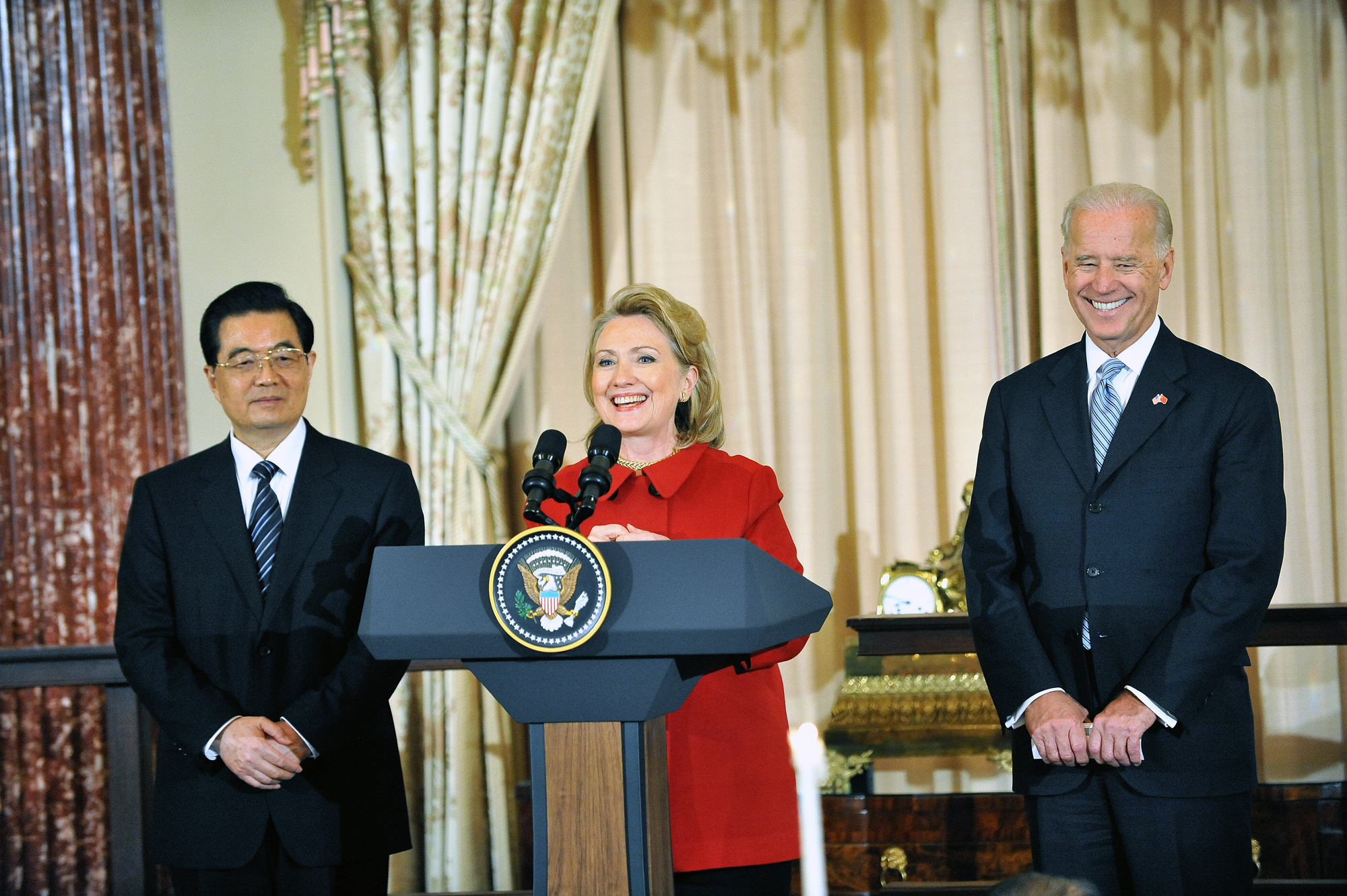
Hu at a 2011 luncheon with U.S. Vice President Joe Biden and Secretary of State Hillary Clinton

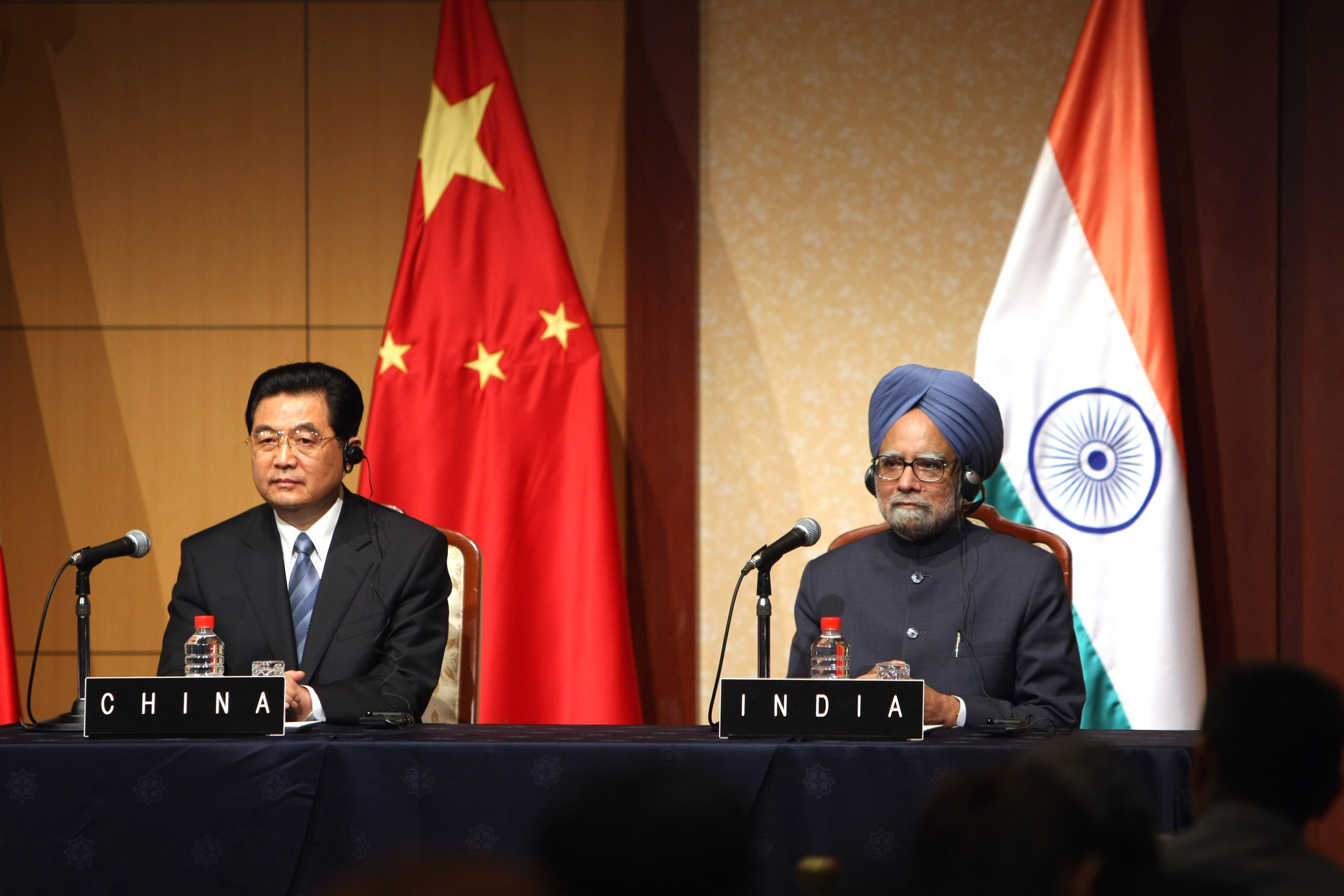
Hu with Indian Prime Minister Manmohan Singh during the 2008 G8 Summit, in Sapporo, Japan

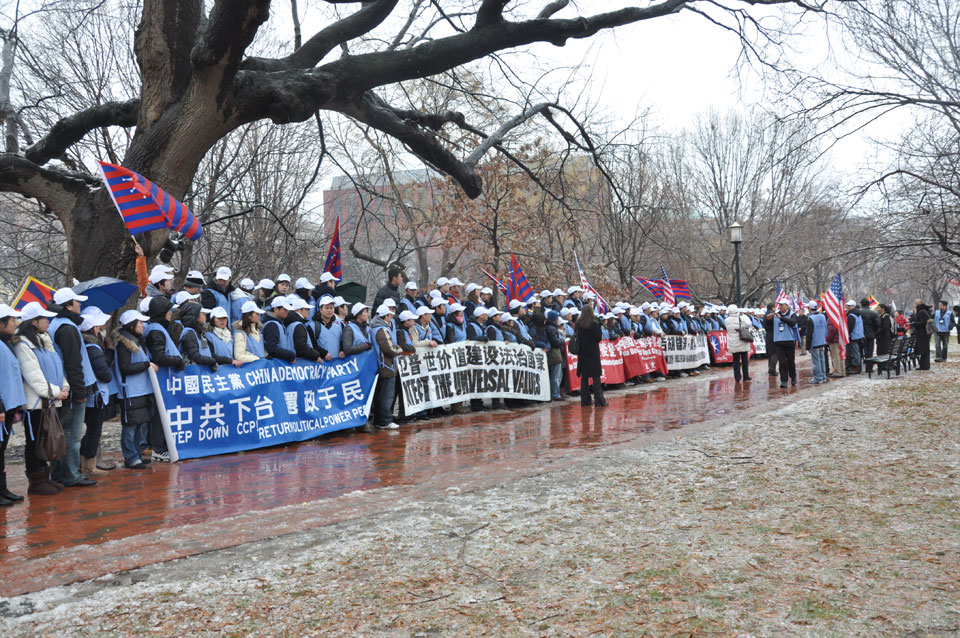
Protests against Hu during his 2011 U.S. visit

Throughout Hu's tenure, China's cooperation with global south countries increased. Under Hu's leadership, China continued its style of developmental diplomacy which had been adopted under Deng Xiaoping and continued by Jiang Zemin. China's international behavior continued to be generally pragmatic and predictable. Hu pledged that China would seek peaceful development in a harmonious world to assure the international community that China's economic growth offered opportunities and benefits rather than conflicts. The key attributes of a harmonious world view of foreign policy are building and accepting a world where countries diverge in their paths of national development and political systems, coexistence of diverse civilizations, and rejected unilateralism and hegemonic ambitions.

Hu emphasized an international relations premise of "shared responsibility": China would contribute to global common good, but it must not adversely affect its core interests in doing so, and its commitments must be conditional to those of other nations. In the analysis of academic Suisheng Zhao, under Hu's leadership, "China remained a reluctant rising power and selectively took on global and regional obligations. Chinese foreign policy became omnidirectional, multilevel, and multidimensional."

In 2006, Hu articulated the four phases of China's foreign policy developmental objectives: (1) big powers were the key, (2) periphery countries the priority, (3) developing countries the foundation, and (4) multilateralism the stage. In 2009, Chinese leader Hu Jintao called for a bolstered arms control agenda at the United Nations General Assembly, joining United States President Barack Obama's earlier calls for a nuclear-free world. In 2009, the first BRIC summit was held in Russia, including China, Brazil and India.

==== Asia ====
Hu sought to develop China's relationship with Japan, which he visited in 2008. Relations deteriorated significantly following the 2010 Senkaku boat collision incident. Relations deteriorated in 2012, triggered by the Japanese government's purchase of the disputed Senkaku Islands from their private owner, which led to anti-Japanese protests. During the 2000s, China participated in the six-party talks regarding North Korea's nuclear program and condemned North Korea's nuclear tests.

==== Europe ====
Hu and Russian President Vladimir Putin held their first meeting in December 2002. The two leaders met regularly, meeting face to face five or six times a year. Russian Prime Minister Dimitry Medvedev and Chinese Premier Wen Jiabao also met regularly, with Wen quipping in 2007 that "We didn't even use prepared speeches." China backed Russia in the Second Chechen War and regards to Russia's concerns of NATO expansion, while Russia backed China regarding the issues of Taiwan, Tibet and Xinjiang. The two countries also increasingly cooperated in the United Nations Security Council.

During the 2008 Russo-Georgian war, China opposed Russia's infringement on Georgia's sovereignty. Citing principles of sovereignty, territorial integrity, and global order, China used its influence in the SCO to prevent the organization from supporting Russia. Hu downgraded relations with Russia because of unfulfilled deals.

=== Taiwan ===
Early in his leadership, Hu faced a pro-independence counterpart in then Republic of China (ROC) president Chen Shui-bian of the Democratic Progressive Party (DPP). Chen called for talks without any preconditions, repudiating the 1992 Consensus. Chen and the DPP had continued to express an ultimate goal of Taiwan independence, and made statements on the political status of Taiwan that the PRC considers provocative. Hu's initial response was a combination of "soft" and "hard" approaches. On the one hand, Hu expressed a flexibility to negotiate on many issues of concern to Taiwan. On the other hand, he continued to refuse talks without preconditions and remained committed to Chinese unification as an ultimate goal. While Hu gave some signs of being more flexible with regard to political relationships with Taiwan as in his May 17 Statement, where he offered to address the issue of "international living space" for Taiwan, Hu's government remained firm in its position that the PRC would not tolerate any attempt by the Taiwanese government to declare de jure independence from China.

After Chen's re-election in the 2004 presidential election, Hu's government changed tactics, conducting a no-contact policy with Taiwan due to Chen and the DPP's independence leanings and repudiation of the 1992 consensus. The government maintained its military build-up against Taiwan, and pursued a vigorous policy of isolating Taiwan diplomatically. In March 2005, the Anti-Secession Law was passed by the National People's Congress, formalizing "non-peaceful means" as an option of response to a declaration of independence in Taiwan. Hu's government increased contacts with the Kuomintang, its former foe in the Chinese Civil War, and still a major party in Taiwan. The increased contacts culminated in the 2005 Pan-Blue visits to mainland China, including a historic meeting between Hu and then-Kuomintang chairman Lien Chan in April 2005. This was the first meeting between the leaders of the two parties since the conclusion of World War II.

On 20 March 2008, the Kuomintang under Ma Ying-jeou won the presidency in Taiwan, and a majority in the Legislative Yuan. Thereafter Hu immediately turned to a more 'soft' diplomatic approach and opened the way to a thaw in relations between the two sides. A series of historic meetings between the CCP and KMT have followed. On 12 April 2008, Hu Jintao met with Taiwan's vice president-elect Vincent Siew in the latter's role as chairman of the Cross-strait Common Market Foundation during the Boao Forum for Asia. On 28 May 2008, Hu met with Kuomintang chairman Wu Po-hsiung, the first meeting between the heads of the CCP and the KMT as ruling parties. During this meeting, Hu and Wu agreed that both sides should re-commence official dialogue under the 1992 consensus – that "both sides recognize there is only one China, but agree to differ on its definition." Wu committed the new government in Taiwan against Taiwanese independence; Hu committed his government to addressing the concerns of the Taiwanese people in regard to security, dignity, and "international living space", with a priority given to allowing Taiwan to participate in the World Health Organization.

In addition to the party-to-party dialogue, de facto governmental dialogue took place via the Straits Exchange Foundation and the Association for Relations Across the Taiwan Straits in June 2008 on the basis of the 1992 Consensus, with the first meeting held in Beijing. Both Hu and his new counterpart Ma Ying-jeou agreed that the 1992 Consensus is the basis for negotiations between the two sides of the Taiwan strait. On 26 March 2008, Hu Jintao held a telephone talk with then US president George W. Bush, in which he became the first Chinese leader to officially recognize the 1992 Consensus. After several months of negotiations, in December 2008, the two sides agreed on the resumption of the Three Links, i.e., a re-opening of mail, trade, and direct air links between the two sides. Relations continued to be cordial between the two sides during Hu's tenure, and trade increased immensely, culminating in the signing of the preferential trade agreement Economic Cooperation Framework Agreement (ECFA) in 2010.

=== Ethnic policies ===
==== Tibet ====
In 2008, numerous protests and demonstrations were held to commemorate the 49th anniversary of the 1959 Tibetan Uprising Day, when the 14th Dalai Lama escaped from Tibet. The protests and demonstrations spread spontaneously to a number of monasteries and throughout the Tibetan plateau, including into counties located outside the Tibet Autonomous Region.

==== Xinjiang ====
In June 2009, false accusations of rape of a Han woman by Uyghur men led to the Shaoguan incident, where a brawl between ethnic Han and Uyghur factory workers in Shaoguan resulted in the deaths of two Uyghurs who were both from Xinjiang. The deaths led to a series of violent riots on 5 July 2009 in Ürümqi, the capital city of Xinjiang. The first day's rioting, which involved at least 1,000 Uyghurs, began as a protest, but escalated into violent attacks that mainly targeted Han people. According to Chinese state media, a total of 197 people died, most of whom were Han people or non-Muslim minorities, with 1,721 others injured and many vehicles and buildings destroyed. Following the riots, Hu curtailed his attendance of the G8 summit in Italy, convened an emergency meeting of the Politburo, and dispatched Standing Committee member Zhou Yongkang to Xinjiang to "guid[e] stability-preservation work in Xinjiang".

=== Hong Kong ===
In February 2003, the National Security (Legislative Provisions) Bill was proposed by the Hong Kong government to fulfill the obligation imposed by Article 23 of the Hong Kong Basic Law. The bill led to strong opposition; on 1 July 2003, more than a half million Hong Kong residents took to the streets to protest the proceedings regarding the bill, as well as to air other grievances against the administration of Chief Executive Tung Chee-hwa, eventually leading to the bill's withdrawal. Afterwards, the CCP appointed Zeng Qinghong to oversee policy issues for Hong Kong. In December 2004, while visiting Macau, Hu criticized Hong Kong's leadership, saying "the officials must turn back and look over the past seven years and find out what has gone wrong".

=== Transition to Xi ===
On 15 November 2012, immediately after the 18th CCP National Congress, Xi was elected to the posts of general secretary of the CCP and chairman of the CMC by the first plenary session of the 18th Central Committee, succeeding Hu. Xi was recommended by Jiang Zemin (the protégé of Chen Yun, Xi Zhongxun's ally) and Wen Jiabao (protégé of Xi Zongxun). On 14 March 2013, he was succeeded by Xi as president.

== After retirement ==
Since his retirement, Hu has kept a low profile, rarely making public appearances. In September 2013, Hu visited an ancestral family home in Huangshan, Anhui, though the trip was not covered by state media. In April 2014, he made an appearance in Hunan, visiting Hunan University and other historical sites. He attended the 19th CCP National Congress in October 2017. He also attended the 70th anniversary of the People's Republic of China in October 2019, and the 100th anniversary of the Chinese Communist Party in July 2021.

=== 20th Communist Party Congress removal incident ===
At the closing ceremony of the 20th CCP National Congress on 22 October 2022, Hu, who had been sitting next to Xi Jinping and Li Zhanshu, was pulled from his seat and escorted out of the hall by two men of Central Guard Regiment. Hu opposed the candidates of Politburo Standing Committee, mainly because his protégé was not included as the standing committee members. This incident occurred before the votes that day, which Hu was absent from as a result. Foreign media speculated about whether this was a deliberate political signal by Xi. The incident was not broadcast in China and censored on the Chinese internet.

=== Jiang Zemin's funeral ===
Following the death of his predecessor Jiang Zemin, Hu was appointed to serve on the funeral committee, ranked 13th on the list out of over 700 names. Hu Jintao appeared in public alongside Xi Jinping on 5 December 2022, attending the farewell ceremony before Jiang's body was cremated in Babaoshan Revolutionary Cemetery.

== Legacy ==
Hu presided over a decade of consistent economic growth, led China through the 2008 financial crisis relatively unscathed, and increased China's international stature immensely. China's achievements under Hu included modernizing China's infrastructure, launching China's first crewed space probe, and sponsoring two successful international events: the 2008 Beijing Olympics and the 2010 Shanghai Expo. In addition, Hu's "soft approach" to Taiwan, coinciding with the election of a Kuomintang government in Taipei, improved the relationship between mainland China and Taiwan. Trade and contact between the two sides increased significantly during Hu's tenure. In addition, Hu and Premier Wen Jiabao's populist policies have resulted in the elimination of agricultural taxes for farmers, more flexible policies towards migrant workers living in cities, more balanced development between the coastal regions and the hinterlands, enforcing minimum wage in cities and the promotion of sustainable and affordable housing developments. The response to the SARS public health crisis and the massive expansion of health insurance coverage for middle- to low-income citizens earned Hu accolades domestically. These policies have been well received by the Chinese public.

In foreign policy, Hu's critics say that his government was overly aggressive in asserting its new power, overestimated its reach, and raised the ire and apprehension of various neighbours, including Southeast Asian countries, India, and Japan. Such policies are also said to be provocative towards the United States. Domestic critics, including the country's elites, intellectuals, and particularly dissidents, point to various shortcomings of the Hu administration and his failure in implementing his signature "Socialist Harmonious Society" policy. They cite, for example, that China's internal security budget exceeded its military budget during Hu's tenure as protests and other 'mass incidents' continued to increase across the country. China's Gini coefficient climbed to 0.47 by 2010, indicating a potentially unsustainable gap between the rich and the poor. The Hu administration's inability to rein in the wealth gap and its renewed emphasis on the role of state-owned enterprises (SOEs) in the economy led some economists to believe that Hu missed a critical opportunity for reform and structural adjustment. Hu's increased support for SOEs, including to merger and consolidate, is a trend that has continued during the administration of Xi Jinping.

Hu's tough-on-corruption policies saw mixed results. While there were some attempts to increase transparency in the expenditures of official organs and bureaucrats, deeply entrenched systemic issues that were contributing to the growth of corruption remained unresolved. In addition, the massive corruption scandal that ensnared the military shortly after Hu's departure from office showed that Hu was unable to tackle entrenched interests in the military. In his own departing speech at the 18th Party Congress, Hu emphasized the potentially devastating effects that unchecked corruption would have on the party and the country. Moreover, the Hu administration's insistence on censorship and the curtailing of freedom of speech drew extensive criticism from human rights organizations and Western governments, while artists and writers inside the country chided increased restrictions on cultural expressions during Hu's term. Although in the early years of his tenure Hu attempted to pioneer a form of "intraparty democracy" that called for greater participation from lower-ranked members to determine policy and select the leadership, there was little evidence of meaningful changes to the party's governing structure and decision-making process. His focus on intraparty democracy did result in the Politburo work report system and the invitation of approximately 200 members of the Central Committee to cast nonbinding votes for Politburo candidates.

Consensus-based decision-making became a hallmark of the Hu era. Hu was never a strongman, did not rule with an iron fist, and was often seen as first-among-equals with his Politburo Standing Committee colleagues. Some called China's political landscape during Hu's era one of "nine dragons taming the water", that is, nine PSC members each ruling over their own fief. In addition, Hu not only faced a profusion of special interest groups and political factions within the party, his ability to implement a cohesive program was also constrained by the influence of former leader Jiang Zemin. Consequently, there is debate on how much power Hu held personally to effect change. Nevertheless, within the context of the system he was placed in, Hu was credited for being an effective mediator and consensus-builder. Hu also won praise for stepping down as military chief in favour of his successor Xi Jinping, and at the same time relinquishing his position as general secretary. This was seen as a message to the establishment and Jiang Zemin that elders should retire according to protocol and avoid meddling in the affairs of their successors. His administration was known for its focus more on technocratic competence.

In 2021, the Resolution on the Major Achievements and Historical Experience of the Party over the Past Century evaluated Hu's tenure as:

After the 16th National Congress, Chinese communists, with Comrade Hu Jintao as their chief representative, united and led the whole Party and the entire nation in advancing practical, theoretical, and institutional innovation during the process of building a moderately prosperous society in all respects. They gained a deep understanding of major questions such as what kind of development to pursue and how to pursue it under new circumstances, and provided clear answers to these questions, thus forming the Scientific Outlook on Development. Taking advantage of an important period of strategic opportunity, they focused their energy on development, with emphasis on pursuing comprehensive, balanced, and sustainable development that put the people first. They worked hard to ensure and improve people's wellbeing, promote social fairness and justice, bolster the Party's governance capacity, and maintain its advanced nature. In doing so, they succeeded in upholding and developing socialism with Chinese characteristics under new circumstances.

== Political positions ==
=== Scientific Outlook on Development ===
Political observers indicate that Hu distinguished himself from his predecessor in both domestic and foreign policy. Hu's political philosophy during his leadership is summarized by three slogans — a "Harmonious Socialist Society" domestically and "Peaceful Development" internationally, the former aided by the Scientific Development Concept, which seeks integrated sets of solutions to arrays of economic, environmental and social problems, and recognizes, in inner circles, a need for cautious and gradual political reforms. The Scientific Outlook on Development was written into the CCP and State Constitutions in 2007 and 2008, respectively. The role of the Party has changed, as formulated by Deng Xiaoping and implemented by Jiang Zemin, from a revolutionary party to a ruling party. During his tenure he continued the Party's modernization, calling for both "Advancement" of the Party and its increasing transparency in governance.

What emerges from these philosophies, in Hu's view, is a country with a systematic approach to national structure and development that combines dynamic economic growth, a free market energized by a vigorous "nonpublic" (i.e., private) sector, heavy-handed political and media control, personal but not political freedoms, concern for the welfare of all citizens, cultural enlightenment, and a synergistic approach to diverse social issues (the Scientific Development Perspective) that lead, in Hu's vision, to a "Harmonious Socialist Society". In the view of the Chinese government, these philosophies, which have created a new "China Model" of governance, serve as a legitimate alternative to the West's "Democracy Model", particularly for developing countries. In Hu's words, "A Harmonious Socialist Society should feature democracy, the rule of law, equity, justice, sincerity, amity and vitality." Such a society, he says, will give full scope to people's talent and creativity, enable all the people to share the social wealth brought by reform and development, and forge an ever-closer relationship between the people and government. Hu even emphasized the potential of religious communities to contribute to economic and social development under the banner of "Building a Harmonious Socialist Society."

Some observers attribute the political origins of low-carbon development strategy to Hu's Scientific Outlook on Development, although some industrial support in this area had already begun before Hu's formulation of the Scientific Outlook on Development.

Western criticism of Hu, particularly regarding human rights, exposes his hypersensitivity to social stability but does not lay as much emphasis on his fresh commitment to address China's multi-faceted social problems. Hu's pragmatic, non-ideological agenda had two core values—maintaining social stability to further economic development and sustaining Chinese culture to enrich national sovereignty. In domestic policy, he seems to want more openness to the public on governmental functions and meetings. Recently, China's news agency published many Politburo Standing Committee meeting details. He also cancelled many events that are traditionally practiced, such as the lavish send-off and welcoming-back ceremonies of Chinese leaders when visiting foreign lands. Furthermore, the Chinese leadership under Hu also focused on such problems as the gap between rich and poor and uneven development between the interior and coastal regions. Both party and state seem to have moved away from a definition of development that focuses solely on GDP growth and toward a definition which includes social equality and environment effects.

In June 2007, Hu gave an important speech at the Central Party School that was indicative of his position of power and his guiding philosophies. In the speech Hu used a very populist tone to appeal to ordinary Chinese, making serious note of the recent challenges China was facing, especially with regards to income disparity. In addition, Hu noted the need for "increased democracy" in the country.

Hu sought to reduce urban-rural inequalities through the campaign to build a "New Socialist Countryside".

=== Moral guidance ===
In response to the great number of social problems in China, in March 2006, Hu Jintao released the "Eight Honors and Eight Shames" as a set of moral codes to be followed by the Chinese people, and emphasized the need to spread the message to the youth. Alternatively known as the "Eight Honors and Disgraces", it contained eight poetic lines which summarized what a good citizen should regard as an honor and what to regard as a shame. It has been widely regarded as one of Hu Jintao's ideological solutions to the perceived increasing lack of morality in China after the reform and opening up brought in a generation of Chinese predominantly concerned with earning money and power in an increasingly frail social fabric.

It has become a norm for Chinese communist leaders to make their own contributions to Marxist–Leninist theory. Whether this is Hu's contribution to Marxist–Leninist theory is debatable, but its general reception with the Chinese public has been moderate. Its promotion, however, is visible almost everywhere: in classroom posters, banners on the street, and electronic display boards for the preparation of the 2008 Olympics, and Expo 2010 in Shanghai. The codes differ from the ideologies of his predecessors, namely, Jiang's Three Represents, Deng Xiaoping Theory, and Mao Zedong Thought in that the focus, for the first time, has been shifted to codifying moral standards as opposed to setting social or economic goals.

== Public image ==
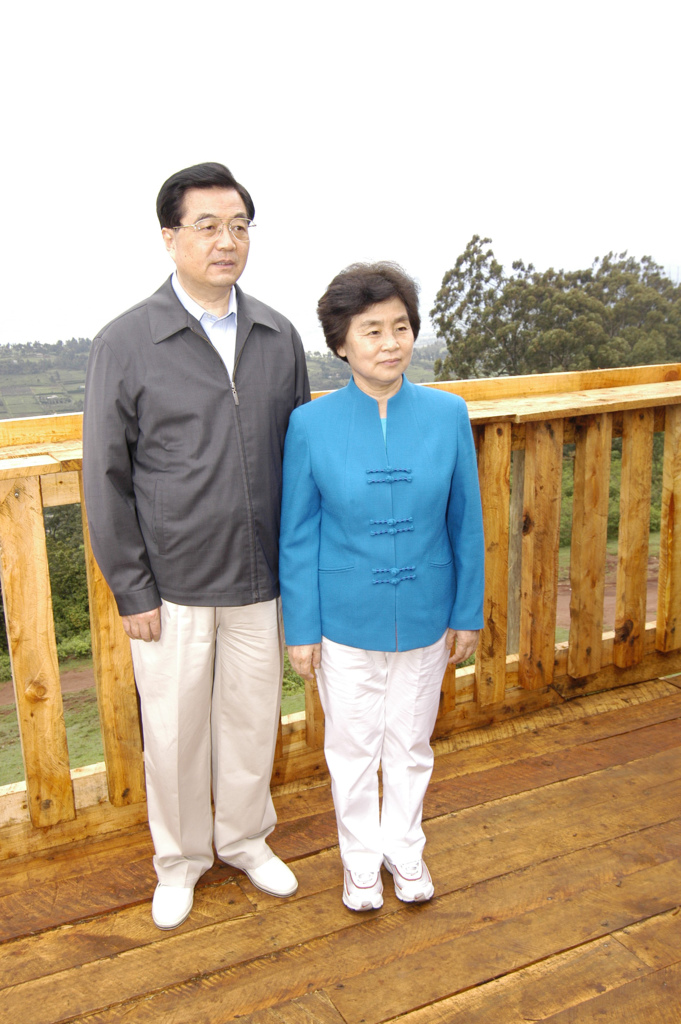
Hu Jintao and his wife Liu Yongqing posing for a photo in 2006.

Newsweek named Hu the second most powerful person in the world in 2009, referring to him as "the man behind the wheel of the world's most supercharged economy." Forbes also named him the second most powerful person in the world later that year. Hu was named the 2010 World's Most Powerful Person by Forbes Magazine. Hu was listed four times (2008, 2007, 2005 and 2004) on the Time 100 annual list of most influential people. In 2010, Reporters Without Borders, an international non-profit and non-governmental organization with the stated aim of safeguarding the right to freedom of information, included Hu among the list of press freedom predators.

== Awards and honors ==
- Colombia: Grand Cross of the National Order of Merit (21 January 1997)
- Cuba: Member of the Order of José Martí (23 November 2004)
- Jordan: Grand Cordon of the Supreme Order of the Renaissance (14 January 2001)
- Madagascar: Grand Cordon of the National Order of Madagascar (25 January 1999)
- Pakistan: Nishan-e-Pakistan (24 November 2006)
- Peru: Grand Cross of Order of the Sun of Peru (19 November 2008)
- Turkmenistan: Member of the Order of Saparmyrat Türkmenbaşy the Great (29 August 2008)
- Ukraine: Member 1st Class of the Order of Prince Yaroslav the Wise (31 August 2010)

== See also ==
- History of China (2002–2012)

== Notes ==
Party political offices
Preceded by Wang Zhaoguo	First Secretary of the Communist Youth League of China; 1984–1985	Succeeded by Song Defu
Preceded by Zhu Houze	Party Secretary of Guizhou; 1985–1988	Succeeded by Liu Zhengwei
Preceded by Wu Jinghua	Party Secretary of Tibet; 1988–1992	Succeeded by Chen Kuiyuan
Preceded by Jiang Zemin	General Secretary of the Chinese Communist Party; 2002–2012	Succeeded by Xi Jinping
Preceded by Jiang Zemin	Chairman of the Central Military Commission of the Chinese Communist Party; 2004–2012	Succeeded by Xi Jinping
Political offices
Preceded by Rong Yiren	Vice President of China; 1998–2003	Succeeded by Zeng Qinghong
Preceded by Jiang Zemin	President of China; 2003–2013	Succeeded by Xi Jinping
Preceded by Jiang Zemin	Chairman of the Central Military Commission of the People's Republic of China; 2005–2013	Succeeded by Xi Jinping
Academic offices
Preceded by Qiao Shi	President of the Central Party School of the Chinese Communist Party; 1993–2002	Succeeded by Zeng Qinghong
Order of precedence
Preceded by Zhang Shengmin as Member of the Politburo of the Chinese Communist Party	Order of precedence of China as Former General Secretary of the Chinese Communist Party	Succeeded by Hu Qili as Former Member of the Politburo Standing Committee of the Chinese Communist Party
