= 16th Politburo of the Chinese Communist Party =

The 16th Politburo of the Chinese Communist Party (CCP), formally the Political Bureau of the 16th Central Committee of the Communist Party of China, was elected at the 1st plenary session of the 16th Central Committee of the CCP on 15 November 2002 in the aftermath of the 16th National Congress. This electoral term was preceded by the 15th Politburo and succeeded by the 17th. Of the 24 members, nine served in the 16th Politburo Standing Committee.

== Composition ==
=== Members ===
Members of the Political Bureau of the 16th Central Committee of the Chinese Communist Party
Officeholder		15th	17th	Birth	PM	Death	Birthplace	Academic attainment	Ethnicity	Gender	Offices held	Ref.
Cao Gangchuan	曹刚川	New	Elected	1938	1956	Alive	Henan	Graduate: Master's degree in military engineering; A degree in Russian language	Han	Male	Two: State offices; State Councillor of the People's Republic of China; Minister of National Defence	
Chen Liangyu	陈良宇	New	Expelled	1946	1980	Alive	Hebei	Undergraduate: Undergraduate degree in architectural structure	Han	Male	Two: Party office; Secretary, Shanghai Municipal Committee; State office; Mayor of the Shanghai Municipal People's Government	
Guo Boxiong	郭伯雄	New	Elected	1942	1961	Alive	Shaanxi	Not public: Attained a degree in military science	Han	Male	One: Military office; Vice Chairman, Central Military Commission	
He Guoqiang	贺国强	New	Elected	1943	1966	Alive	Hunan	Graduate: Master's degree in chemical engineering	Han	Male	One: Party office; Head, Organisation Department, Central Committee	
Hu Jintao	胡锦涛	Old	Elected	1942	1964	Alive	Jiangsu	Graduate: Master's degree in hydraulic engineering	Han	Male	Five: Party offices; General Secretary, Central Committee; Head, Central Leading Group for Taiwan Affairs of the Central Committee; Head, Central Leading Group for Financial and Economic Work of the Central Committee; Head, Central Leading Group for Network Security and Information Technology of the Central Committee; Military offices; Chairman, Central Military Commission; President of the People's Republic of China	
Huang Ju	黄菊	Old	Died	1938	1966	2007	Shanghai	Graduate: Master's degree in electrical machinery manufacturing	Han	Male	One: State office; Vice Premier of the People's Republic of China	
Hui Liangyu	回良玉	New	Elected	1944	1969	Alive	Jilin	Undergraduate: Undergraduate degree in economics	Hui	Male	One: State office; Vice Premier of the People's Republic of China	
Jia Qinglin	贾庆林	Old	Elected	1940	1959	Alive	Hebei	Graduate: Master's degree in engineering of electric motor and appliance design and manufacture	Han	Male	One: Organisational office; Chairman, National Committee of the Chinese People's Political Consultative Conference	
Li Changchun	李长春	Old	Elected	1944	1965	Alive	Liaoning	Graduate: Master's degree in industrial enterprise automation engineering	Han	Male	Two: Party office; Chairman, Central Guidance Commission on Building Spiritual Civilization	
Liu Qi	刘淇	New	Elected	1942	1975	Alive	Jiangsu	Graduate: Graduate degree in iron-smelting	Han	Male	Two: Party office; Secretary, Beijing Municipal Party Committee; State office; Mayor of the Beijing Municipal People's Government	
Liu Yunshan	刘云山	New	Elected	1947	1971	Alive	Shanxi	Not public: Was given a university education at the Central Party School	Han	Male	One: Party office; Head, Publicity Department of the Central Committee	
Luo Gan	罗干	Old	Not	1935	1960	Alive	Shandong	Graduate: Master's degree in engineering	Han	Male	One: Party office; Secretary, Central Political and Legal Affairs Commission	
Wang Lequan	王乐泉	New	Elected	1944	1966	Alive	Shandong	Graduate: Doctoral degree, but unknown in which subject.	Han	Male	Two: Party offices; Deputy Secretary, Central Political and Legal Affairs Commission of the Central Committee; Secretary, Xinjiang Provincial Party Committee	
Wang Zhaoguo	王兆国	New	Elected	1941	1965	Alive	Hebei	Graduate: Master's degree in engineering.	Han	Male	Two: Organisational office; Chairman, Central Committee of the All-China Federation of Trade Unions; State office; Vice Chairman, Standing Committee of the National People's Congress	
Wen Jiabao	温家宝	Old	Elected	1942	1965	Alive	Tianjin	Graduate: Doctoral degree in geological survey; Bachelor's degree in structural geology	Han	Male	One: State office; Premier of the People's Republic of China	
Wu Bangguo	吴邦国	Old	Elected	1941	1964	2024	Anhui	Graduate: Master's degree in engineering	Han	Male	One: State office; Chairman, Standing Committee of the National People's Congress	
Wu Guanzheng	吴官正	Old	Not	1938	1963	Alive	Jiangxi	Graduate: Doctoral degree in engineering	Han	Male	One: Party office; Secretary, Standing Committee of the Central Commission for Discipline Inspection	
Wu Yi	吴仪	Alternate	Not	1938	1962	Alive	Wuhan	Undergraduate: Undergraduate degree in petroleum refinery engineering	Han	Female	One: State office; Vice Premier of the People's Republic of China	
Yu Zhengsheng	俞正声	New	Elected	1945	1964	Alive	Zhejiang	Graduate: Graduate programme in Missile engineering	Han	Male	One: Party office; Secretary, Hubei Provincial Party Committee	
Zeng Peiyan	曾培炎	New	Not	1939	1978	Alive	Zhejiang	Graduate: Master's degree in electrical engineering	Han	Male	One: Party office; Vice Premier of the People's Republic of China	
Zeng Qinghong	曾庆红	Alternate	Not	1939	1960	Alive	Jiangxi	Graduate: Master's degree in engineering	Han	Male	Two: Party office; President, Central Party School of the Central Committee; State office; Vice President of the People's Republic of China	
Zhang Dejiang	张德江	New	Elected	1946	1971	Alive	Liaoning	Graduate: Graduate programme in world economics; Undergraduate degree in Korean	Han	Male	Two: Party office; Secretary, Guangdong Provincial Party Committee	
Zhang Lichang	张立昌	New	Not	1939	1966	2008	Hebei	Undergraduate: Undergraduate degree in economic management	Han	Male	Two: Party office; Secretary, Tianjin Municipal Committee; State office; Chairman, Standing Committee of the Tianjin Municipal People's Congress	
Zhou Yongkang	周永康	New	Elected	1942	1964	Alive	Jiangsu	Graduate: Master's degree in geophysical survey and exploration	Han	Male	Two: State offices; State Councillor of the People's Republic of China; Minister of Public Security	

=== Alternate ===
Alternate of the Political Bureau of the 16th Central Committee of the Chinese Communist Party
Officeholder		15th	17th	Birth	PM	Birthplace	Academic attainment	Ethnicity	Gender	Offices held	Ref.
Wang Gang	王刚	New	Member	1942	1971	Jilin	Undergraduate: Undergraduate degree in philosophy	Han	Male	One: Party office; Head, General Office of the Central Committee	
