= Eight Musts =

Policy for the role of the Chinese Communist Party by Xi Jinping's administration

The Eight Musts (Chinese: 八个必须) are a policy set by the General Secretary Xi Jinping administration regarding the role of the Chinese Communist Party in Chinese society.

== Policy ==
The Eight Musts are:

- we must persist in the dominant role of the people; 必须坚持人民主体地位
- we must persist in liberating and developing social productive forces; 必须坚持解放和发展社会生产力;
- we must persist in moving reform and opening-up forward; 必须坚持推进改革开放
- we must persist in safeguarding social fairness and justice; 必须坚持维护社会公平正义
- we must persist in marching the path of common prosperity; 必须坚持走共同富裕道路
- we must persist in stimulating social harmony; 必须坚持促进社会和谐
- we must persist in peaceful development; 必须坚持和平发展
- we must persist in the leadership of the Party. 必须坚持党的领导

== See also ==
- Ideology of the Chinese Communist Party
