= Deng Xiaoping and the Making of Modern China =

1993 book by Richard Evans

- Title page for Deng Xiaoping and the Making of Modern China (1994)
- Author: Sir Richard Evans
- Language: English
- Genre: Non-fiction
- Publication date: 1993

Deng Xiaoping and the Making of Modern China is a book by Sir Richard Evans chronicling the rise of Deng Xiaoping as the leader of the People's Republic of China. The first British edition was published in 1993 by the Hamilton company. The first American edition was published by Viking Books in 1993. This was Evans's first book. Evans had served as the Ambassador of the United Kingdom to China, from 1984 to 1988. To conduct his research, with approval of PRC officials, Evans had interviewed several PRC governmental officials. At the time of publication, there were multiple books about Deng Xiaoping being published in Chinese and English.

== Content ==
Glen Jennings, author of a book review for the Australian Journal of Politics and History, wrote that the book is "a lucid account of Deng's life and an accessible general introduction to the CCP and the People's Republic of China." A.P. of Current History wrote that the book "follows" closely the career of Deng "almost entirely from the angle of party politics." The book uses Deng's official biography, interviews of CPC historians, secondary sources, and translations of works by Deng as sources. Ann Kent wrote in the Australian Outlook that the book is "[m]ore a narrative of the complicated ups and downs of Deng's career than a searching portrayal or character study". She argues that the main image of Deng in the book is the "'black cat, white cat' pragmatist, of no fixed ideological address, who ultimately succeeded in reasserting his power and changing China's entire political direction through sheer force of circumstance combined with political acumen." A.P. wrote that "Deng's private life remains remote" and therefore Evans produced "very little about" the childhood of Deng and that Evans "is constantly running into walls and left to cite with hushed attention some fairly banal details" when not discussing Deng's political career.

The book includes a history of the development of the Chinese Communist Party along with information about Deng himself. Peter R. Moody wrote in the Annals of the American Academy of Political and Social Science that "There are long stretches with much more Party history than information about Deng." Margaret Flanagan wrote in Booklist that "Since Deng Xiaoping's life literally parallels the course of modern Chinese history, this chronicle also provides a blueprint for comprehending the often arcane complexities of twentieth-century China." In Moody's words, the book concludes that Deng was "pragmatic in economics and repressive in politics". Kent wrote that the book's epilogue "provides a balance sheet of Deng's achievements and failures."

The individuals thanked for the book include Qian Qichen and other members of the Central Committee Research Department. This included the head of the Deng Xiaoping Study Group.

A.P. concluded that Evans's "respect" for Deng "is palpable." Jennings argued that the book is "appraising Deng's career in a generally positive manner". He argued that the author "supports Deng Xiaoping's emphasis on the primacy of economic reform", and also that he "tends to downplay negative issues which have the potential to tarnish Deng's overall reputation as a political pragmatist and determined economic reformer." Mirsky argued that the book has a "trusting quality" towards information given from Communist Party sources.

== Reception ==
Dick Wilson of The China Quarterly said in 1994 that "[f]or the time being, this is probably the best book to recommend about China's paramount leader." Mark Meng of the Library Journal said that the book "is well researched and full of insightful observations" and is "[h]ighly recommended for all libraries." Donald Zagoria of Foreign Affairs said that the book "will be a reliable and valued guide for years to come" and that it "is superbly researched, quite readable and extremely judicious in its assessments." Margaret Flanagan of Booklist said that the book is "Highly recommended for Asian studies collections."

Beth Duff-Brown of The New York Times Book Review said "Long on history and short on inside anecdote, this book will tell you everything you've ever wanted to know about Deng except who he really is." Simon Finch of New Statesman said that "this book could usefully replace Deng's state-approved biography for the time being. Yet it still requires "a great leap forward" before another account begins to gauge the full significance of this diminutive and influential old man." Peter R. Moody wrote in the Annals of the American Academy of Political and Social Science said that the author "writes clearly, accurately, and often insightfully but does not add much to what others have done." Moody concluded that "This well-written study is probably useful for the general reader, someone interested in history or public affairs who wants a balanced overview of contemporary China and its rulers."

Benjamin Yang of The China Journal said that the book "is of mediocre quality" and argues that "[t]o regard this as the 'best book on modern China in four decades (Asian Times) or to say it offers 'everything you ever wanted to know about Deng' (The New York Times) reflects less on the quality of the book than on the reviewers." Louise do Rosario of the Far Eastern Economic Review said that the book "pales by comparison with" The New Emperors and that Deng Xiaoping and the Making of Modern China "appears to have been written in haste." The Economist stated that there was a large amount of difficulty in writing a biography of Deng since he was still ruling China, and that despite the fact that the author "has a fluent style, and offers some usefully crisp summaries" he "contributes little to an understanding of his subject's complexities" and "adds little to what we already know."

Ann Kent wrote in the Australian Outlook that the book was "competent, readable but not heavily documented". She argued that while it was a "useful guide to Deng's activities" it is a "sanitised version of Deng's life, partly or perhaps" because of Evans's experiences in China. Kent wrote that the book does not explain why Deng became, after Mao's death, "the most important political figure in China"; reconcile the views of Deng being a "ruthless demagogue" and being "China's great liberal reformer"; use primary and secondary accounts regarding Deng's life during the Cultural Revolution and after the death of Zhou Enlai; or "elucidate the controversies" regarding Deng's career. Moody wrote that the lack of "personal detail" is the most disappointing aspect of the work, and that even though the author was not a professional scholar "and it may not be to the point to fault his book for lacking pedantry" Moody argued that the author did not make use of "his on-the-spot experience." Moody stated that Evans and Harrison Salisbury, the author of The New Emperors both "used similar sources" but that "Evans seems to lack Salisbury's nose for the salacious detail that inquiring minds want to know."

Tim Ward of The Globe and Mail argued that the book "embodies this quality of evenness - one of the highest virtues of classical China" and that despite the presence of criticism, the presence of "a dispassionate sense of balance" would cause Deng Xiaoping to approve the book.
