= 15th Politburo of the Chinese Communist Party =

The 15th Politburo of the Chinese Communist Party (CCP), formally the Political Bureau of the 15th Central Committee of the Communist Party of China, was elected at the 1st plenary session of the 15th Central Committee of the CCP on 19 September 1997 in the aftermath of the 15th National Congress. This electoral term was preceded by the 14th Politburo and succeeded by the 16th. Seven of the 22 members served in the 15th Politburo Standing Committee.

== Composition ==
=== Members ===
Members of the Political Bureau of the 15th Central Committee of the Chinese Communist Party
Officeholder		14th	16th	Birth	PM	Death	Birthplace	Offices held	Ref.
Chi Haotian	迟浩田	New	Not	1929	1946	Alive	Shandong	Two: Military office; Vice Chairman, Central Military Commission; State office; Minister of Defense	
Ding Guangen	丁关根	Old	Not	1929	1956	2012	Jiangsu	One: Party office; Head, Publicity Department of the Central Committee	
Hu Jintao	胡锦涛	Old	Elected	1942	1964	Alive	Jiangsu	Four: Party offices; First-ranked Secretary, Central Committee Secretariat; President, Central Party School of the Central Committee; Military offices; Vice Chairman, Central Military Commission; State offices; Vice President of the People's Republic of China	
Huang Ju	黄菊	Old	Elected	1938	1966	2007	Shanghai	Two: Party office; Secretary, Shanghai Municipal Committee; State office; Mayor of the Shanghai Municipal People's Government	
Jia Qinglin	贾庆林	New	Elected	1940	1959	Alive	Hebei	Two: Party office; Secretary, Beijing Municipal Committee; State office; Mayor of the Beijing Municipal People's Government	
Jiang Chunyun	姜春云	Old	Not	1930	1947	2021	Shandong	One: State office; Vice Chairman, Standing Committee of the National People's Congress	
Jiang Zemin	江泽民	Old	Not	1926	1946	2022	Jiangsu	Five: Party offices; General Secretary, Central Committee; Head, Central Leading Group for Taiwan Affairs of the Central Committee; Head, Central Leading Group for Financial and Economic Work of the Central Committee; Military office; Chairman, Central Military Commission; State office; President of the People's Republic of China	
Li Changchun	李长春	New	Elected	1944	1965	Alive	Liaoning	One: Party office; Secretary, Guangdong Provincial Party Committee	
Li Lanqing	李岚清	Old	Not	1932	1952	Alive	Jiangsu	One: State office; Vice Premier of the People's Republic of China	
Li Peng	李鹏	Old	Not	1928	1945	2019	Shanghai	One: State office; Chairman, Standing Committee of the National People's Congress	
Li Ruihuan	李瑞环	Old	Not	1934	1959	Alive	Tianjin	One: Organisational office; Chairman, National Committee of the Chinese People's Political Consultative Conference	
Li Tieying	李铁映	Old	Not	1936	1955	Alive	Shaanxi	One: State office; President, Chinese Academy of Social Sciences	
Luo Gan	罗干	New	Elected	1935	1960	Alive	Shandong	Two: Party office; Secretary, Central Political and Legal Affairs Commission; State office; State Councillor of the People's Republic of China	
Qian Qichen	钱其琛	Old	Not	1928	1942	2017	Tianjin	Two: State office; Vice Premier of the People's Republic of China; Minister of Foreign Affairs	
Tian Jiyun	田纪云	Old	Not	1929	1945	Alive	Shandong	One: State office; Vice Chairman, Standing Committee of the National People's Congress	
Wei Jianxing	尉健行	Old	Not	1931	1949	2015	Zhejiang	One: Party office; Secretary, Standing Committee of the Central Commission for Discipline Inspection	
Wen Jiabao	温家宝	Alternate	Elected	1942	1965	Alive	Tianjin	One: State office; Vice Premier of the People's Republic of China	
Wu Bangguo	吴邦国	Old	Elected	1941	1964	2024	Anhui	One: State office; Vice Premier of the People's Republic of China	
Wu Guanzheng	吴官正	New	Elected	1938	1963	Alive	Jiangxi	One: Party office; Secretary, Shandong Provincial Party Committee	
Xie Fei	谢非	Old	Died	1932	1949	1999	Guangdong	One: State office; Vice Chairman, Standing Committee of the National People's Congress	
Zhang Wannian	张万年	New	Not	1928	1945	2015	Shandong	One: Military office; Vice Chairman, Central Military Commission	
Zhu Rongji	朱镕基	Old	Not	1928	1949	2026	Shandong	One: State office; Premier of the People's Republic of China	

=== Alternates ===
Alternates of the Political Bureau of the 15th Central Committee of the Chinese Communist Party
Officeholder		14th	16th	Birth	PM	Death	Birthplace	Gender	Offices held	Ref.
Wu Yi	吴仪	New	Member	1938	1962	Alive	Wuhan	Female	One: State office; State Councillor of the People's Republic of China	
Zeng Qinghong	曾庆红	New	Member	1939	1960	Alive	Jiangxi	Male	Two: Party offices; Head, General Office of the Central Committee; Head, Organization Department of the Central Committee	
