= 17th Politburo of the Chinese Communist Party =

Chinese policy making body

The 17th Politburo of the Chinese Communist Party (CCP), formally the Political Bureau of the 17th Central Committee of the Communist Party of China, was elected at the 1st plenary session of the 17th Central Committee of the CCP on 22 October 2007 in the aftermath of the 17th National Congress. This electoral term was preceded by the 16th Politburo and succeeded by the 18th. Of the 25 members, nine served in the 17th Politburo Standing Committee.

Bo Xilai was expelled from the 17th Politburo and the CCP during this electoral term, while three others (Xu Caihou, Zhou Yongkang, and Guo Boxiong) were expelled from the CCP during the 18th tenure for charges of political corruption during this electoral term.

== Composition ==
Members of the Political Bureau of the 17th Central Committee of the Chinese Communist Party
Officeholder		16th	18th	Birth	PM	Birthplace	Academic attainment	Ethnicity	Gender	Offices held	Ref.
Bo Xilai	薄熙来	New	Expelled	1949	1980	Beijing	Graduate: Master's degree in journalism; Bachelor's degree in world history	Han	Male	One: Party office; Secretary, Chongqing Municipal Committee	
Guo Boxiong	郭伯雄	Old	Not	1942	1961	Shaanxi	Not public: Attained a degree in military science	Han	Male	One: Military office; Vice Chairman, Central Military Commission	
He Guoqiang	贺国强	Old	Not	1943	1966	Hunan	Graduate: Master's degree in chemical engineering	Han	Male	Two: Party offices; Secretary, Standing Committee of the Central Commission for Discipline Inspection; Head, Central Leading Group for Inspection Work	
Hu Jintao	胡锦涛	Old	Not	1942	1964	Jiangsu	Graduate: Master's degree in hydraulic engineering	Han	Male	Five: Party offices; General Secretary, Central Committee; Head, Central Leading Group for Taiwan Affairs of the Central Committee; Head, Central Leading Group for Financial and Economic Work of the Central Committee; Head, Central Leading Group for Network Security and Information Technology of the Central Committee; Military offices; Chairman, Central Military Commission; President of the People's Republic of China	
Hui Liangyu	回良玉	Old	Not	1944	1969	Jilin	Undergraduate: Undergraduate degree in economics	Hui	Male	One: State office; Vice Premier of the People's Republic of China	
Jia Qinglin	贾庆林	Old	Not	1940	1959	Hebei	Graduate: Master's degree in engineering of electric motor and appliance design and manufacture	Han	Male	One: Organisational office; Chairman, National Committee of the Chinese People's Political Consultative Conference	
Li Changchun	李长春	Old	Not	1944	1965	Liaoning	Graduate: Master's degree in industrial enterprise automation engineering	Han	Male	Two: Party office; Chairman, Central Guidance Commission on Building Spiritual Civilization	
Li Keqiang	李克强	New	Elected	1955	1974	Hefei	Graduate: Doctoral degree in Marxist legal studies; Undergraduate degree in chemical engineering	Han	Male	One: State office; First-ranked Vice Premier of the People's Republic of China	
Li Yuanchao	李源潮	New	Elected	1950	1978	Jiangsu	Graduate: Doctoral degree in Marxist legal studies; Master's degree in mathematics; Master's degree in management science; Graduate programme in scientific socialism	Han	Male	One: Party office; Head, Organization Department of the Central Committee	
Liu Qi	刘淇	Old	Not	1942	1975	Jiangsu	Graduate: Graduate degree in iron-smelting	Han	Male	One: State office; Vice Premier of the People's Republic of China	
Liu Yandong	刘延东	New	Elected	1945	1964	Jiangsu	Graduate: Master's degree in sociology	Han	Female	One: State office; State Councillor of the People's Republic of China	
Liu Yunshan	刘云山	Old	Elected	1947	1971	Shanxi	Not public: Was given a university education at the Central Party School	Han	Male	One: Party office; Head, Publicity Department of the Central Committee	
Wang Gang	王刚	Alternate	Not	1942	1971	Jilin	Undergraduate: Undergraduate degree in philosophy	Han	Male	One: Organisational office; Vice Chairman, National Committee of the Chinese People's Political Consultative Conference	
Wang Lequan	王乐泉	Old	Not	1944	1966	Shandong	Graduate: Doctoral degree, but unknown in which subject.	Han	Male	Two: Party offices; Deputy Secretary, Central Political and Legal Affairs Commission of the Central Committee; Secretary, Xinjiang Provincial Party Committee	
Wang Qishan	王岐山	New	Elected	1948	1983	Shanxi	Undergraduate: Undergraduate degree in history	Han	Male	One: State office; Vice Premier of the People's Republic of China	
Wang Yang	汪洋	New	Elected	1955	1975	Anhui	Graduate: Master's degree in management science; Bachelor's degree in public administration; Programme in political economy	Han	Male	One: Party office; Secretary, Guangdong Provincial Committee	
Wang Zhaoguo	王兆国	Old	Not	1941	1965	Hebei	Graduate: Master's degree in engineering.	Han	Male	Two: Organisational office; Chairman, Central Committee of the All-China Federation of Trade Unions; State office; Vice Chairman, Standing Committee of the National People's Congress	
Wen Jiabao	温家宝	Old	Not	1942	1965	Tianjin	Graduate: Doctoral degree in geological survey; Bachelor's degree in structural geology	Han	Male	One: State office; Premier of the People's Republic of China	
Wu Bangguo	吴邦国	Old	Not	1941	1964	Anhui	Graduate: Master's degree in engineering	Han	Male	One: State office; Chairman, Standing Committee of the National People's Congress	
Xi Jinping	习近平	New	Elected	1953	1974	Beijing	Graduate: Doctoral degree in Marxist legal studies; Undergraduate degree in chemical engineering	Han	Male	Four: Party offices; First-ranked secretary, Central Committee Secretariat; President, Central Party School of the Central Committee; Military office; Vice Chairman, Central Military Commission; State offices; Vice President of the People's Republic of China	
Xu Caihou	徐才厚	New	Not	1943	1971	Hebei	Not public: Attained a degree in military engineering	Han	Male	One: Military office; Vice Chairman, Central Military Commission	
Yu Zhengsheng	俞正声	Old	Elected	1945	1964	Zhejiang	Graduate: Graduate programme in Missile engineering	Han	Male	Two: Organisational office; Chairman, National Committee of the Chinese People's Political Consultative Conference; Chairman, China Council for the Promotion of Peaceful Reunification	
Zhang Dejiang	张德江	Old	Elected	1946	1971	Liaoning	Graduate: Graduate programme in world economics; Undergraduate degree in Korean	Han	Male	Two: Party office; Secretary, Chongqing Municipal Committee; State office; Vice Premier of the People's Republic of China	
Zhang Gaoli	张高丽	New	Elected	1946	1973	Fujian	Graduate: Graduate programme in economics	Han	Male	One: Party office; Secretary, Tianjin Municipal Committee	
Zhou Yongkang	周永康	Old	Not	1942	1964	Jiangsu	Graduate: Master's degree in geophysical survey and exploration	Han	Male	One: Party office; Secretary, Central Political and Legal Affairs Commission	
