= 14th Politburo of the Chinese Communist Party =

The 14th Politburo of the Chinese Communist Party (CCP), formally the Political Bureau of the 14th Central Committee of the Communist Party of China, was elected at the 1st plenary session of the 14th Central Committee of the CCP on 19 October 1992 in the aftermath of the 14th National Congress. This electoral term was preceded by the 13th Politburo and succeeded by the 15th. Seven of the 21 members served concurrently in the 14th Politburo Standing Committee.

== Composition ==
=== Members ===
Members of the Political Bureau of the 14th Central Committee of the Chinese Communist Party
Officeholder		13th	15th	Birth	PM	Death	Birthplace	Offices held	Ref.
Chen Xitong	陈希同	New	Expelled	1930	1949	2013	Shanghai	Two: Party office; Secretary, Beijing Municipal Committee; State office; Mayor of the Beijing Municipal People's Government	
Ding Guangen	丁关根	Alternate	Elected	1929	1956	2012	Jiangsu	One: Party office; Head, Publicity Department of the Central Committee	
Hu Jintao	胡锦涛	New	Elected	1942	1964	Alive	Jiangsu	Two: Party offices; First-ranked Secretary, Central Committee Secretariat; President, Central Party School of the Central Committee; Military offices	
Huang Ju	黄菊	4th PLE	Elected	1938	1966	2007	Shanghai	Two: Party office; Secretary, Shanghai Municipal Committee; State office; Mayor of the Shanghai Municipal People's Government	
Jiang Chunyun	姜春云	New	Elected	1930	1947	2021	Shandong	One: Party office; Secretary, Shandong Provincial Party Committee	
Jiang Zemin	江泽民	Old	Elected	1926	1946	2022	Jiangsu	Five: Party offices; General Secretary, Central Committee; Head, Central Leading Group for Taiwan Affairs of the Central Committee; Head, Central Leading Group for Financial and Economic Work of the Central Committee; Military office; Chairman, Central Military Commission; State office; President of the People's Republic of China	
Li Lanqing	李岚清	New	Elected	1932	1952	Alive	Jiangsu	One: State office; Vice Premier of the People's Republic of China	
Li Peng	李鹏	Old	Elected	1928	1945	2019	Shanghai	One: State office; Premier of the People's Republic of China	
Li Ruihuan	李瑞环	Old	Elected	1934	1959	Alive	Tianjin	One: Organisational office; Chairman, National Committee of the Chinese People's Political Consultative Conference	
Li Tieying	李铁映	Old	Elected	1936	1955	Alive	Shaanxi	One: State office; State Councillor of the People's Republic of China	
Liu Huaqing	刘华清	New	Not	1916	1929	2011	Hubei	One: Military office; First-ranked Vice Chairman, Central Military Commission	
Qian Qichen	钱其琛	New	Elected	1928	1942	2017	Tianjin	Two: State office; Vice Premier of the People's Republic of China; Minister of Foreign Affairs	
Qiao Shi	乔石	Old	Not	1924	1940	2015	Shanghai	One: State office; Chairman, Standing Committee of the National People's Congress	
Tan Shaowen	谭绍文	New	Died	1929	1953	1993	Sichuan	One: Party office; Secretary, TianjinMunicipal Committee	
Tian Jiyun	田纪云	Old	Elected	1929	1945	Alive	Shandong	One: State office; Vice Chairman, Standing Committee of the National People's Congress	
Wei Jianxing	尉健行	New	Elected	1931	1949	2015	Zhejiang	Two: Party office; Secretary, Beijing Municipal Committee; State office; Mayor of the Beijing Municipal People's Government	
Wu Bangguo	吴邦国	New	Elected	1941	1964	2024	Anhui	Three: Party office; Secretary, Shanghai Municipal Committee; State office; Vice Premier of the People's Republic of China; Mayor of the Shanghai Municipal People's Government	
Xie Fei	谢非	New	Elected	1932	1949	1999	Guangdong	One: Party office; Secretary, Guangdong Provincial Party Committee	
Yang Baibing	杨白冰	New	Not	1920	1938	2013	Chongqing	None: Held no other positions than membership of this electoral term.	
Zhu Rongji	朱镕基	New	Elected	1928	1949	2026	Shandong	Two: State office; Vice Premier of the People's Republic of China; Governor, People's Bank of China	
Zou Jiahua	邹家华	New	Not	1926	1945	2025	Shanghai	One: State office; Vice Premier of the People's Republic of China	

=== Alternates ===
Alternates of the Political Bureau of the 14th Central Committee of the Chinese Communist Party
Officeholder		13th	15th	Birth	PM	Death	Birthplace	Offices held	Ref.
Wang Hanbin	王汉斌	New	Not	1925	1941	Alive	Jiangxi	One: State office; Vice Chairman, Standing Committee of the National People's Congress	
Wen Jiabao	温家宝	New	Member	1942	1965	Alive	Tianjin	One: Party office; Head, General Office of the Central Committee	
