= Press Conference of the Premier of the State Council =

Press conference by the government of the People's Republic of China

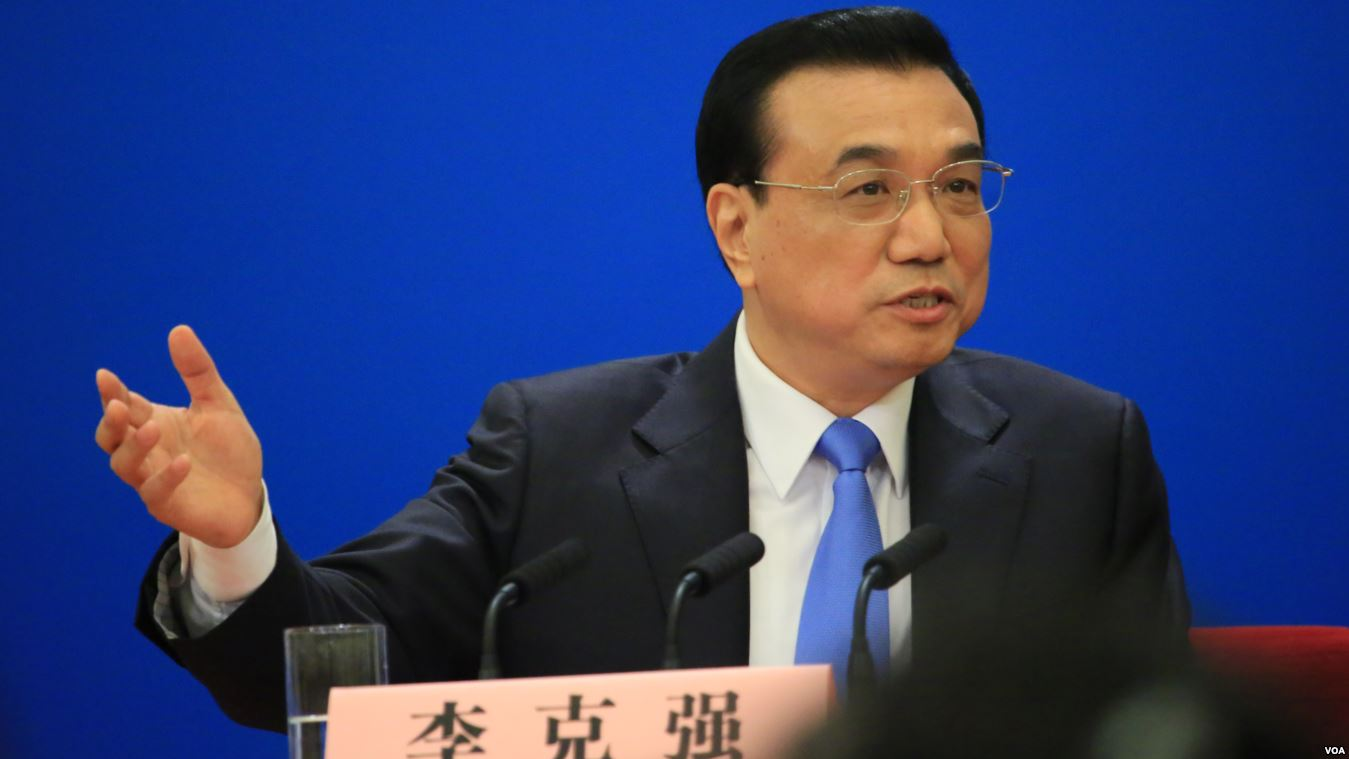
March 2015, Premier Li Keqiang of the State Council attended the press conference

The Press Conference of the Premier of the State Council, also known as the "Premier's Q&A with Journalists", is a meeting held by the Premier of the State Council, who serves as the head of government of China, with both domestic and foreign journalists. The Premier's press conference started in 1988 when Premier Li Peng accepted an invitation from the spokesperson of the 7th National People's Congress, Zeng Tao, to meet with journalists from mainland China, Hong Kong, Macau, Taiwan, and foreign countries.

After 1993, the Premier's press conferences tended toward normalization. When Zhu Rongji became Premier in 1998, the press conference became a focal point of the National People's Congress sessions, and its duration extended to two and a half hours. During the tenures of Wen Jiabao and Li Keqiang as Premier of the State Council, a press conference was held each year after the closing of the National People's Congress sessions. When Li Qiang became Premier in 2023, only one press conference has been held since. Starting in 2024, it was officially announced that, barring special circumstances, there would no longer be Premier's press conferences in the years following the current National People's Congress session.

== History ==
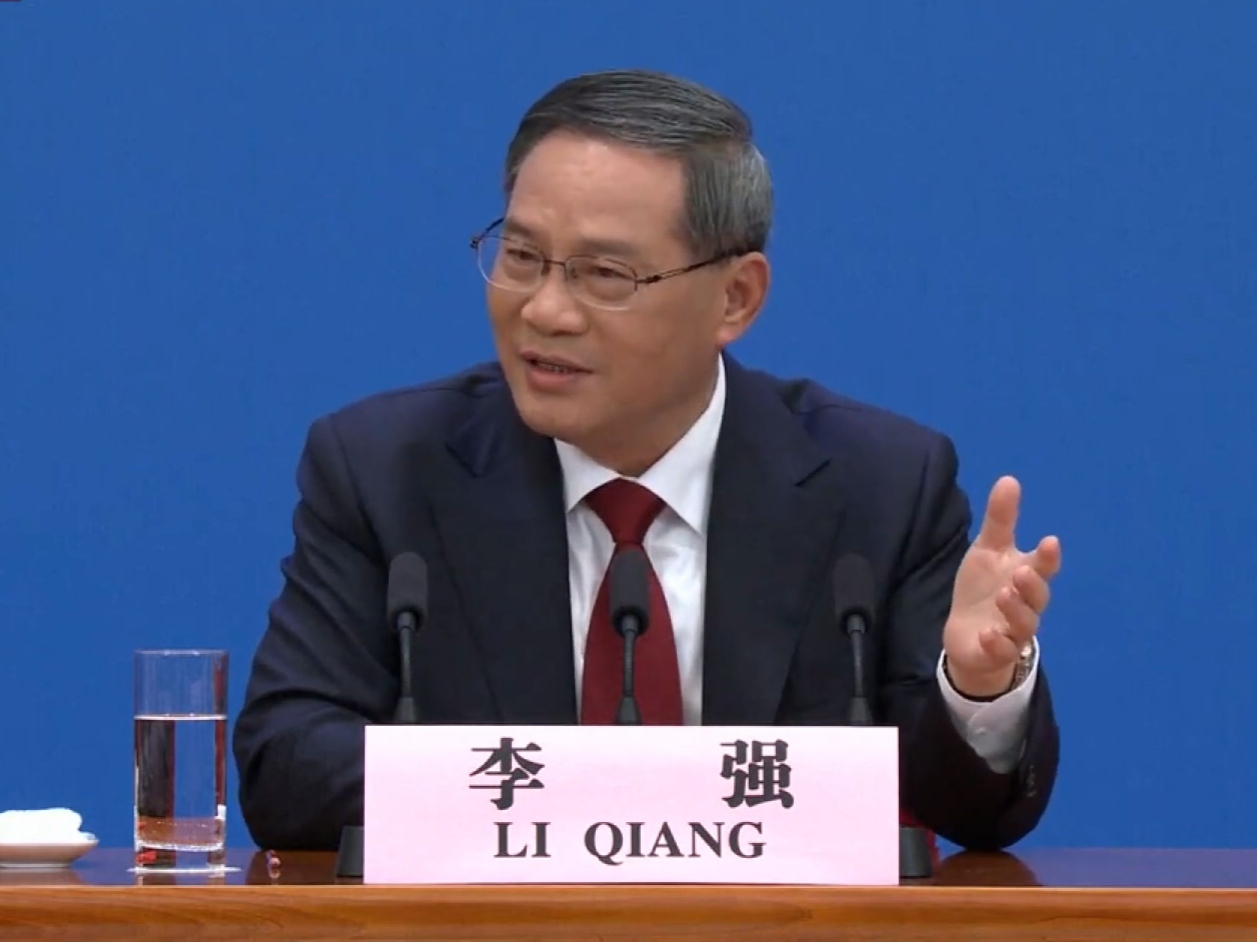
Premier Li Qiang meets the press after the closing of the first session of the 14th National People's Congress at the Great Hall of the People in Beijing, March 13, 2023

The tradition of holding a press conference with the premier traced back to 1988, after the first session of 7th National People's Congress, when Li Peng was invited to meet the press. It was also from that time onwards that China Central Television began to broadcast the press conference live.

In April 1989, the Rules of Procedure of the National People's Congress, passed during the Second Session of the 7th National People's Congress, stipulated that the National People's Congress should be "openly held". It also specifically included "holding press conferences and receptions for journalists" as part of the proceedings of the National People's Congress.

In March 2012, Premier Wen Jiabao, in his final major press conference, emphasized the need for political openness and warned against the potential reoccurrence of historic tragedies like the Cultural Revolution after the fifth session of the 11th National People's Congress. His remarks were seen as an rebuke to Bo Xilai, known for his "red revival" campaign promoting Mao Zedong-era themes. Bo was fired as the Chinese Communist Party Committee Secretary of Chongqing a day after the press conference.

On May 28, 2020, Premier Li Keqiang attended the press conference following the conclusion of the Third Session of the 13th National People's Congress. During the conference, he disclosed that currently in China, around 600 million people have a monthly income of only about 1000 yuan. This statement sparked widespread controversy, especially considering that 2020 was designated by the General Secretary of the Chinese Communist Party, Xi Jinping, as the year to eradicate absolute poverty.

On March 4, 2024, a spokesperson said China's Premier Li Qiang will not brief the media at the close of the Second Session of the 14th National People's Congress. After the cancellation of the premier's press conference was announced, some media outlets analyzed that this signaled the country's increasingly inward focus and centralized control, indicating Xi's gradual downgrading of the premier's role, thus bringing an end to the tradition of the premier's press conference at the Two Sessions that had been maintained for 30 years.

== List of conferences ==
Date	Venue	Meeting	Attending Premier	Relevant reports
13 April 1988	Great Hall of the People	7th National People's Congress, First Session	Li Peng	
9 April 1991	Great Hall of the People	7th National People's Congress, Fourth Session	Li Peng	
13 March 1993	Great Hall of the People	8th National People's Congress, First Session	Li Peng	
22 March 1994	Great Hall of the People	8th National People's Congress, Second Session	Li Peng	
18 March 1995	Great Hall of the People	8th National People's Congress, Third Session	Li Peng	
17 March 1996	Great Hall of the People	8th National People's Congress, Fourth Session	Li Peng	
14 March 1997	Great Hall of the People	8th National People's Congress, Fifth Session	Li Peng	
19 March 1998	Great Hall of the People	9th National People's Congress, First Session	Zhu Rongji	
15 March 1999	Great Hall of the People	9th National People's Congress, Second Session	Zhu Rongji	
15 March 2000	Great Hall of the People	9th National People's Congress, Third Session	Zhu Rongji	
15 March 2001	Great Hall of the People	9th National People's Congress, Fourth Session	Zhu Rongji	
15 March 2002	Great Hall of the People	9th National People's Congress, Fifth Session	Zhu Rongji	
18 March 2003	Great Hall of the People	10th National People's Congress, First Session	Wen Jiabao	
14 March 2004	Great Hall of the People	10th National People's Congress, Second Session	Wen Jiabao	
14 March 2005	Great Hall of the People	10th National People's Congress, Third Session	Wen Jiabao	
14 March 2006	Great Hall of the People	10th National People's Congress, Fourth Session	Wen Jiabao	
16 March 2007	Great Hall of the People	10th National People's Congress, Fifth Session	Wen Jiabao	
18 March 2008	Great Hall of the People	11th National People's Congress, First Session	Wen Jiabao	
13 March 2009	Great Hall of the People	11th National People's Congress, Second Session	Wen Jiabao	
14 March 2010	Great Hall of the People	11th National People's Congress, Third Session	Wen Jiabao	
14 March 2011	Great Hall of the People	11th National People's Congress, Fourth Session	Wen Jiabao	
14 March 2012	Great Hall of the People	11th National People's Congress, Fifth Session	Wen Jiabao	
17 March 2013	Great Hall of the People	12th National People's Congress, First Session	Li Keqiang	
13 March 2014	Great Hall of the People	12th National People's Congress, Second Session	Li Keqiang	
15 March 2015	Great Hall of the People	12th National People's Congress, Third Session	Li Keqiang	
16 March 2016	Great Hall of the People	12th National People's Congress, Fourth Session	Li Keqiang	
15 March 2017	Great Hall of the People	12th National People's Congress, Fifth Session	Li Keqiang	
20 March 2018	Great Hall of the People	13th National People's Congress, First Session	Li Keqiang	
15 March 2019	Great Hall of the People	13th National People's Congress, Second Session	Li Keqiang	
28 May 2020	Great Hall of the People (Premier) Media Center (China) (Press)	13th National People's Congress, Third Session	Li Keqiang	
11 March 2021	Great Hall of the People (Premier) Media Center (China) (Press)	13th National People's Congress, Fourth Session	Li Keqiang	
11 March 2022	Great Hall of the People (Premier) Media Center (China) (Press)	13th National People's Congress, Fifth Session	Li Keqiang	
13 March 2023	Great Hall of the People	14th National People's Congress, First Session	Li Qiang	

== See also ==
- Politics of China
