= Medal of the Republic (TV series) =

Chinese television series in 2021

Chinese name
- Traditional Chinese: 功勋
- Simplified Chinese: 功勛
Transcriptions
Standard Mandarin
- Hanyu Pinyin: Gōngxūn
- Genre: Biographical, historical
- Written by: Wang Xiaoqiang, Gong Xiangdong, Xu Su, Liu Gejian, Li Xiuwen, Chen Ping, Song Fangjin, Shen Jie, Wang Xiaoping
- Directed by: Zheng Xiaolong (chief director); Shen Yan, Lin Nan, Yang Wenjun, Mao Weining, Kang Honglei, Yan Jiangang, Yang Yang
- Starring: Lei Jiayin; Jiang Xin; Tong Dawei; Guo Tao; Huang Zhizhong; Huang Xiaoming; Zhou Xun
- Country of origin: China
- Original language: Mandarin
- No. of seasons: 1
- No. of episodes: 48

Production
- Executive producers: Cao Ping; Dun Yong
- Production companies: Shanghai Media Group; Dongyang Chunyu Film and Television Culture Co., Ltd. Dongyang LETV Huaer Film and Television Culture Co., Ltd. Rongchuang Future Film and Television Cultural Media (Beijing) Co., Ltd. Alibaba Pictures; Tencent Pictures iQIYI; Zhejiang Radio and Television Group; Jiangsu Broadcasting Corporation

Original release
- Network: Zhejiang Television; Dragon Television; Beijing Television; Jiangsu Television
- Release: September 26, 2021

Medal of the Republic (Chinese: 功勋) is a 2021 Chinese eight-part anthology biographical television series, narrating the deeds of eight people who were awarded the Medals of the Republic.

It consists of eight segments directed by eight directors, Zheng Xiaolong (also chief director), Shen Yan, Lin Nan, Yang Wenjun, Mao Weining, Kang Honglei, Yan Jiangang, and Yang Yang. It stars many of China's top actors, many in supporting roles and cameos. The series follows the stories of the first group of eight recipients (Li Yannian, Yu Min, Zhang Fuqing, Huang Xuhua, Shen Jilan, Sun Jiadong, Tu Youyou and Yuan Longping) of the Medal of the Republic, China's highest honor for those who have made great contributions to the development of the People's Republic of China. Medal of the Republic is also a production to celebrate the 100th Anniversary of the Chinese Communist Party. The series was aired on Zhejiang Television, Dragon Television, Beijing Television and Jiangsu Television on 26 September 2021.

== Synopsis ==
=== Li Yannian ===
The episode about Li Yannian, a soldier of the People's Volunteer Army, centers on the battlefield during the Korean War, he and his fellow soldiers retake a strategic highland and fulfill the mission.

=== Yu Min ===
The episode about Yu Min, a nuclear physicist, is about how he overcome obstacles and make breakthroughs in hydrogen bomb research after several months of undertaking complex calculations.

=== Zhang Fuqing ===
The episode about Zhang Fuqing, a soldier of the People's Liberation Army, is about his distinguished service in the Chinese Civil War and his efficiency in Laifeng County after he retired from active duty.

=== Huang Xuhua ===
The episode about Huang Xuhua, picks up his efforts to develop China's first nuclear submarine between 1952 and 1988.

=== Shen Jilan ===
The episode about Shen Jilan, a delegate to the National People's Congress, highlights her efforts to defend women's labor rights and advocate for the inclusion of "equal pay for equal work" between men and women in the Constitution.

=== Sun Jiadong ===
The episode about Sun Jiadong, sees his efforts to develop China's first space satellite, Dong Fang Hong I, in the 1960s.

=== Tu Youyou ===
The episode about Tu Youyou, a Nobel Prize winner, focuses on her efforts to develop artemisinin in the 1970s, which is used to treat malaria.

=== Yuan Longping ===
The episode about Yuan Longping, an agronomist, is about how he develops the first hybrid rice varieties

== Cast ==
=== Li Yannian (directed by Mao Weining) ===
- Wang Lei as Li Yannian, a soldier of the People's Volunteer Army.

=== Yu Min (directed by Shen Yan) ===
- Lei Jiayin as Yu Min, a nuclear physicist, recipient of Two Bombs, One Satellite Achievement Medal, known as the "Father of Chinese Hydrogen Bomb".
- Ni Ni as Sun Yuqin, wife of Yu Min.
- Yang Shuo as Lao Ma
- Wang Xiao as Lu Jie
- Tian Xiaojie as Lao Hao
- Shi An as Yuan Jinhong
- Bai Fan as Doctor Sun
- You Yong as Deputy Minister
- Hu Ke as Yu Su

=== Zhang Fuqing (directed by Kang Honglei) ===
- Guo Tao as Zhang Fuqing, a soldier of the People's Liberation Army.
- Sun Qian as Sun Yulan, wife of Zhang Fuqing.
- Ding Yongdai as Peng Dehuai

=== Huang Xuhua (directed by Yang Yang) ===
- Huang Xiaoming as Huang Xuhua, chief designers for China's first generation of nuclear submarines (Type 091 and Type 092).
- Chen Hao as Li Shiying, wife of Huang Xuhua.
- Huang Xiaolei as Chun Ling
- Ai Liya as Director Liu

=== Shen Jilan (directed by Lin Nan) ===
- Jiang Xin as Shen Jilan, delegate to the National People's Congress.
- Chen He as Li Chengying, husband of Shen Jilan.
- Zuo Xiaoqing as Li Hua
- Li Guangjie as Zhang Hailiang
- Liu Yuning as a correspondent
- Chi Shuai as a journalist
- Wang Jinghua as mother of Xiu Zhi
- Xing Minshan as battalion commander
- Jian Renzi as Xiu Zhi
- Lin Siyi as Lai Di
- Sun Yining as Li Guiying
- Meng Asai as Shitou

=== Sun Jiadong (directed by Yang Wenjun) ===
- Tong Dawei as Sun Jiadong, father of China's carrier rocket and satellite technology.
- Sun Li as Wei Suping, wife of Sun Jiadong.
- Liu Yijun as Qian Xuesen
- Liu Huan as Chen Xiyuan
- Wang Zijian as Huang Zhiming
- Lin Yongjian as Nie Rongzhen
- Liu Jing as Zhou Enlai
- Wang Yanan as Chen Qian
- Zhugang Riyao as Li Donghai

=== Tu Youyou (directed by Zheng Xiaolong) ===
- Zhou Xun as Tu Youyou, pharmaceutical chemist and malariologist who discovered artemisinin and dihydroartemisinin, used to treat malaria, a breakthrough in twentieth-century tropical medicine, saving millions of lives in South China, Southeast Asia, Africa, and South America.
- Zhang Songwen as Li Tingzhao, husband of Tu Youyou.
- Chen Baoguo as Doctor Liao
- Xi Meijuan as mother of Tu Youyou
- Yu Rongguang as Zhang Jianguang
- Huo Qing as Lü Chuanzhi
- Cao Xinyue
- Bi Yanjun

=== Yuan Longping (directed by Yan Jiangang) ===
- Huang Zhizhong as Yuan Longping, agronomist, known for developing the first hybrid rice varieties.
- Dong Jie as Deng Zhe, wife of Yuan Longping.
- Ren Zhong (actor) as Tan Panggong
- Jiang Mengjie as Tian Hehua

== Reception ==
Douban, a major Chinese media rating site, gave the drama 9.1 out of 10.
