= Shen Jilan =

Chinese politician (1929–2020)

- 申纪兰
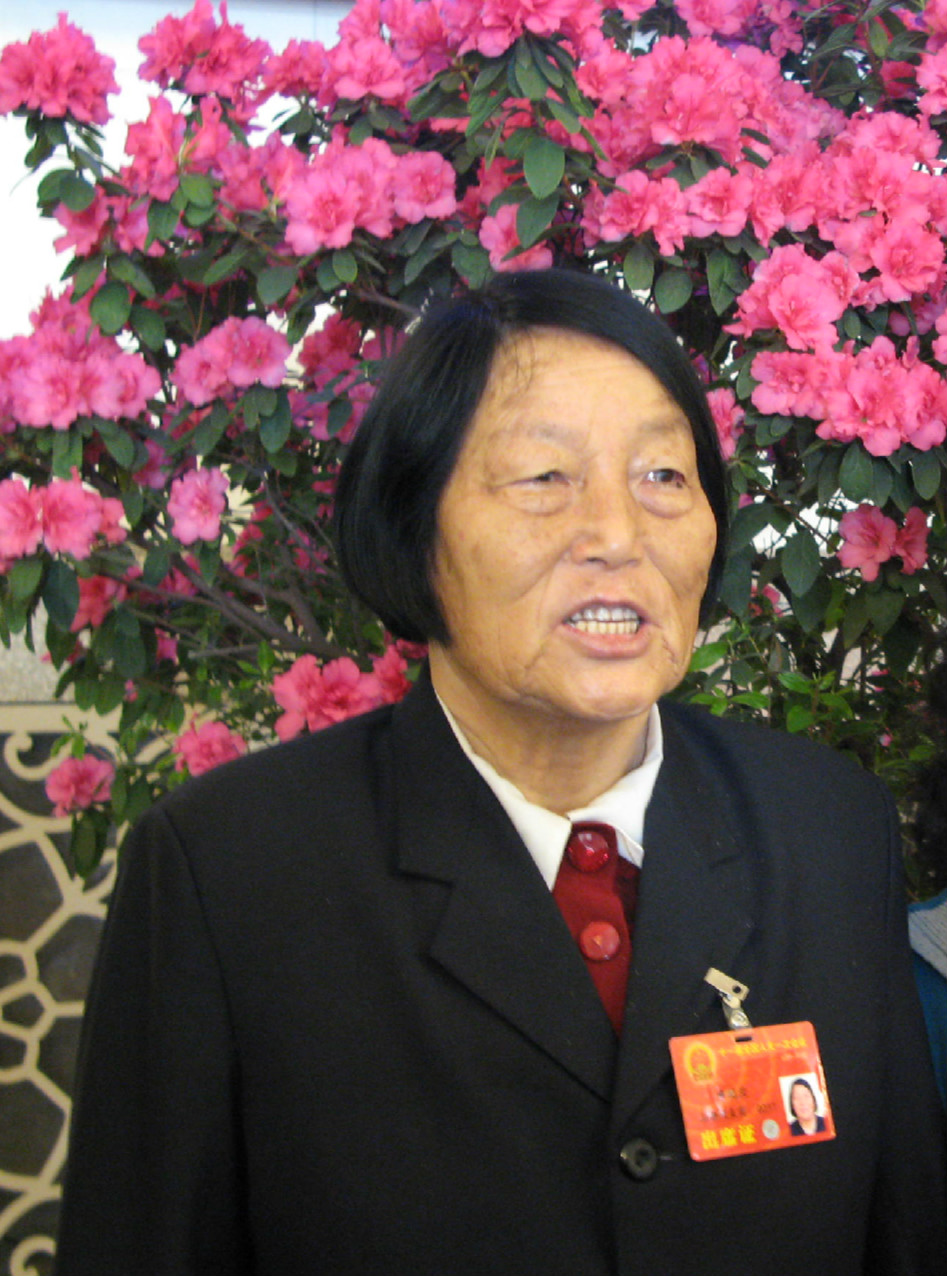
- Shen in 2012

Delegate to the National People's Congress
- In office 15 September 1954 – 28 June 2020
- Chairman: Liu Shaoqi→Zhu De→Song Qingling (acting)→Ye Jianying→Peng Zhen→Wan Li→Qiao Shi→Li Peng→Wu Bangguo→Zhang Dejiang→Li Zhanshu

Vice Chairwoman of the Standing Committee of the Changzhi People's Congress
- In office 1983–1993

Director of the Shanxi Women's Federation
- In office 1973–1983

Personal details
- Born: 29 December 1929 Pingshun County, Shanxi, China
- Died: 28 June 2020 (aged 90) Changzhi, Shanxi, China
- Party: Chinese Communist Party
- Children: 3
- Parent(s): Song Jinshui (father); Wu Quanxiang (mother); Shen Hengtai (stepfather)
- Occupation: Politician
- Awards: Order of the Republic (2019)

Chinese name
- Traditional Chinese: 申紀蘭
- Simplified Chinese: 申纪兰
Transcriptions
Standard Mandarin
- Hanyu Pinyin: Shēn Jìlán
- Wade–Giles: Shên^{1} Chi^{4}-lan^{2}

Shen Jilan (Chinese: 申纪兰; pinyin: Shēn Jìlán; 29 December 1929 – 28 June 2020) was a Chinese politician affiliated with the Chinese Communist Party and was a former farmer. She held numerous governance positions and was elected to the 1st National People's Congress in 1954, and went on to be re-elected for all subsequent sittings of the National People's Congress over the next 65 years, the only person with this distinction. This has led to some commentators calling her the world's longest-serving congresswoman.

Shen was bestowed the Medal of the Republic, the highest honorary medal of the People's Republic of China, in September 2019.

== Biography ==
Shen was born in Pingshun County, Shanxi, on 29 December 1929. Her father, Song Jinshui (宋进水), died early. In 1934, her mother, Wu Quanxiang (武全香), remarried to Shen Hengtai (申恒泰), a doctor in Pingshun County. Shen Jilan grew up in Pingshun County. In 1943, she responded to a call by Mao Zedong and the Central Committee of the Chinese Communist Party to establish party organisation in Xigou village alongside Li Shunda. Together with other farming families, she established a local agricultural labour mutual aid group and defence force. The success of this local cooperative allowed Shen to rise to prominence within the Party in the 1950s.

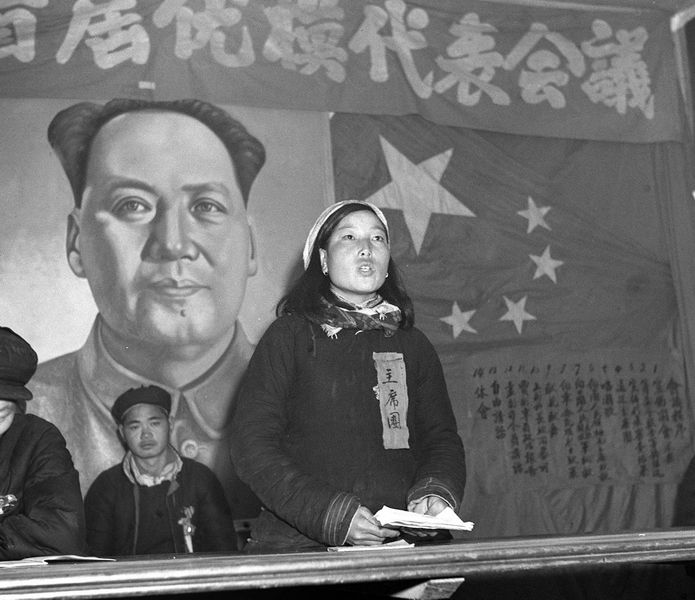
Shen Jilan in 1953

In 1952, she was encouraged by higher powers in the Communist Party to widen the cooperative to cover 26 individual farms – the first production cooperative to be established in the People's Republic of China. On the establishment of this wider cooperative Jilan was elected deputy president. She established a working women's group to carry out agricultural work.

In 1954, she proposed the addition of the equal pay for equal work clause in the first constitution of China to reduce the gender pay gap, and her proposal was adopted. She commented in a 2018 interview: "Men got 10 work points a day, but we only got a maximum of five points no matter how much work we did." To highlight the unfairness in this approach, she organised a manuring contest between the male and female workers, which the female workers won.

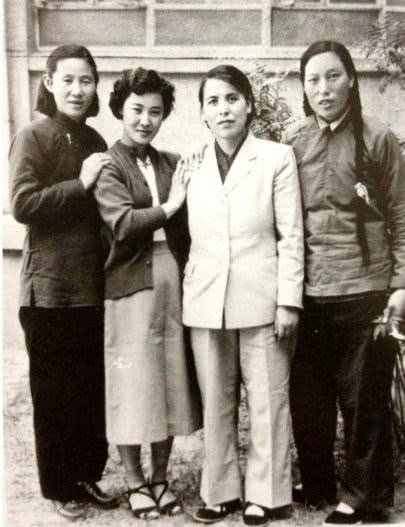
Four female representatives from Shanxi attended the first National People's Congress in 1954 (Shen at far right)

In 1953, Shen joined the Chinese Communist Party and gained widespread media attention due to the success of the farming cooperative. She was elected to the 1st National People's Congress in 1954 as one of four female representatives from Shanxi province. Of the 1,226 deputies to attend the first congress, only 147 were women. She was the only person to have been elected to every session of the National People's Congress, having been returned to the 13th National People's Congress in 2018.

In 1973, Shen became director of the Shanxi Women's Federation, a position she held for ten years, before returning to her home village of Xigou in 1983. During this period, China was establishing a market economy and Shen established herself as an entrepreneur in the local economy. She helped establish a ferroalloy plant, walnut oil factory, and cannery in the local area. She was also an integral part of a reforestation plan in Xigou.

In 2008, she was chosen as an Olympic torch carrier as part of the buildup to the 2008 Summer Olympics. It was reported by local media that she donated 10,000 Chinese yuan to the 2008 Sichuan earthquake relief efforts. When her calls for widespread internet regulation in 2013 met with controversy, Shen suggested that she did not "follow the trends among the young", but argued that displaying different points of view are a benefit of the National People's Congress system. In 2019, she was awarded the highest order of honour in China, the Medal of the Republic. There is a museum dedicated to Jilan's life in Xigou.

She was considered a somewhat controversial figure by democracy activists given the fact she never voted against the party. These activists criticised her voting in favour of the Hong Kong national security law in 2020.

She died on 28 June 2020, at the age of 90, from stomach cancer.

== Personal life ==
Shen was married to Zhang Hailiang (张海亮), a veteran of the Korean War who later became director of Changzhi Municipal Urban Construction Bureau. The couple had one son and two daughters. In order of birth: Zhang Lizhen (张李珍; director of a military hospital in Handan), Zhang Jiangping (张江平; Party chief of Changzhi Municipal Food Bureau), and Zhang Jiang'e (张江娥; staff member of Changzhi Municipal Engineering Division).

== Political Positions ==
=== Loyalty to the Party ===
In 2009 during the 2nd Session of the 11th National People's Congress, Shen was interviewed by Henan Business Daily, and she said

I strongly support the Communist Party. To be a Representative is to be obedient to the Party. I have never voted no.

Her statement drew wide attention. Some media pointed out that Shen supported struggle sessions against Liu Shaoqi during the Cultural Revolution, while she supported rehabilitation for him after the Cultural Revolution ended.

In 2011, Shen said that

As a witness to the system of People's Congress, I would vote yes for whatever I support from heart, and would abstain otherwise.

=== Internet control ===
During 2012 National People's Congress, Shen said

I have an opinion that the internet should be managed [by the authority], and not everyone should be allowed to do [writing on the internet], just like People's Daily. [Authorities in] foreign countries messed it up, we can't be like them. We should do it in accordance with the principles, and should not make good things bad, [allowing people] saying whatever they want. We are a socialist country led by the Communist Party.... For the internet, whoever wants to go online could go online? Or should it require approval by the [authority] organization?

The Southern Metropolis Daily further reported her opinion that some people browsed inappropriate contents online, toxicating the youth.

=== No contact with voters ===
During 2012 National People's Congress, Shen stated that it would be inappropriate for the Representatives of the People's Congress to communicate with voters in elections.

Here we rely on democratic elections. It's inappropriate to communicate [with voters in elections]. If you're not elected, you should not seek help from others.

=== Superiority of socialist states ===
In 2011, China expanded the trial target population of the new rural social pension insurance, and many farmers older than 60 enjoyed pension for the first time. In 2013, Shen said

[I] am able to receive pension. Only socialist countries are able to do this. I feel very happy.
