= Third session of the 11th National People's Congress =

2010 session of the Chinese legislature

2010 National People's Congress; 第十一届全国人民代表大会第三次会议; _{3rd plenary session of the}; _{11th National People's Congress}; 5 March – 14 March
President	Premier	Congress Chairman
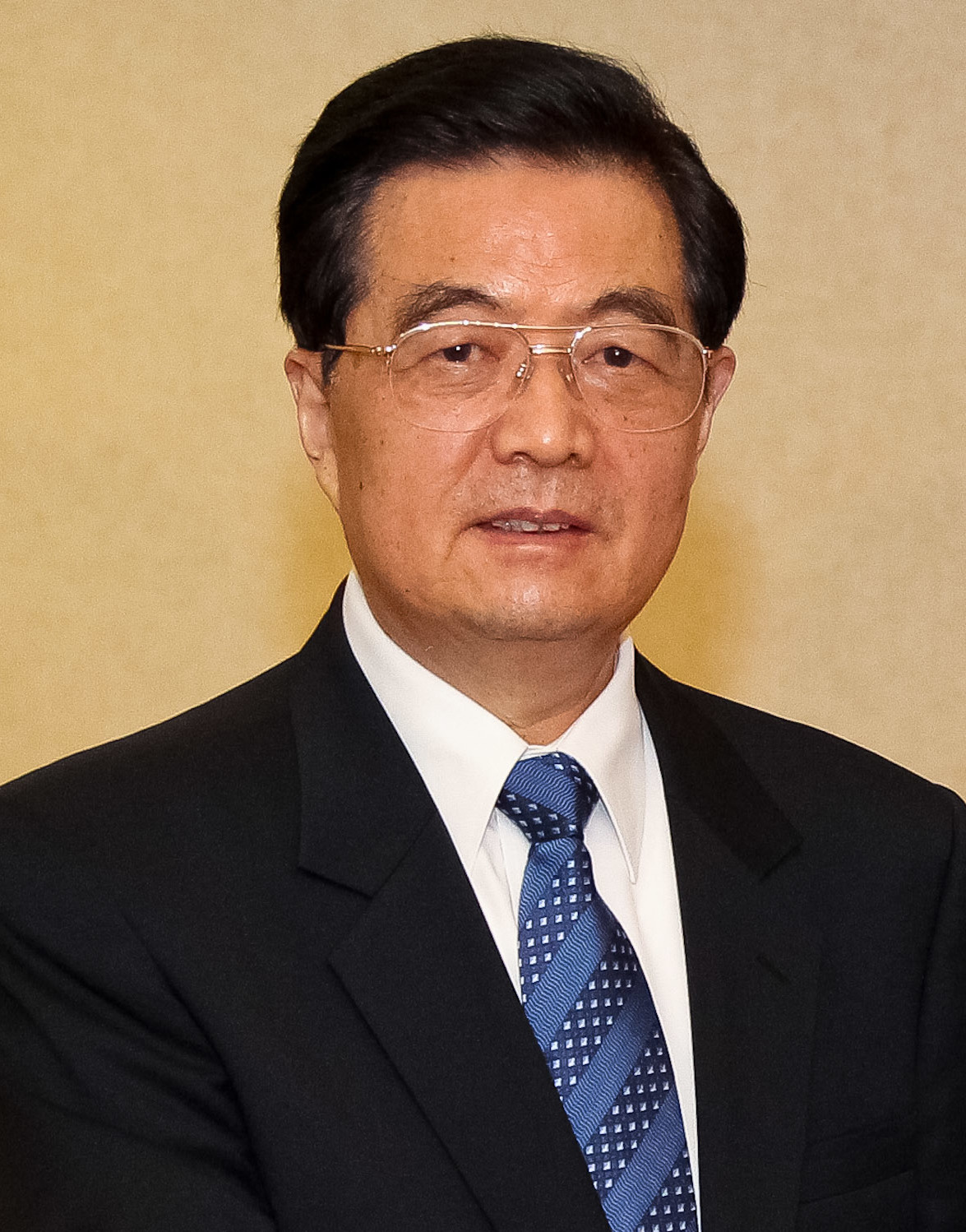
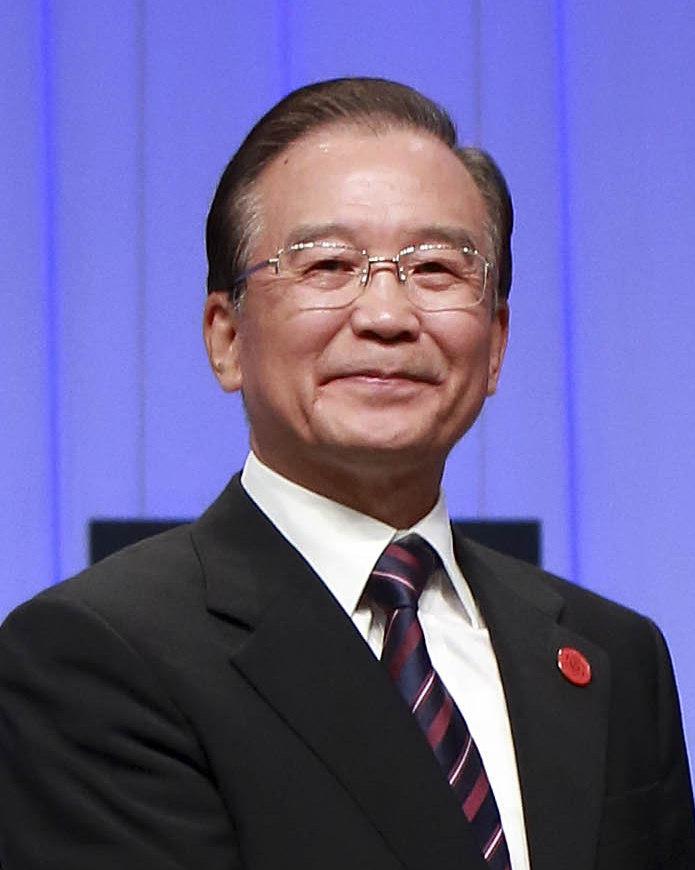
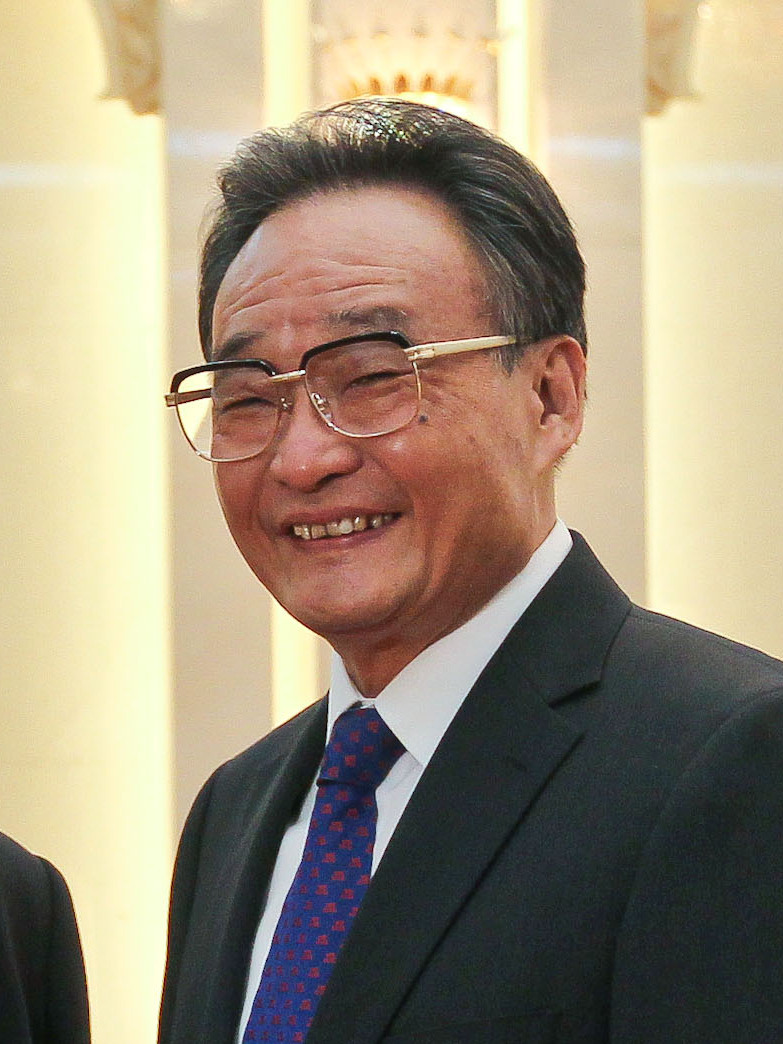
Hu Jintao	Wen Jiabao	Wu Bangguo
since 15 March 2003	since 16 March 2003	since 15 March 2003

Website
- 2010 NPC official website

The third session of the 11th National People's Congress held its annual meeting in March 2010 at the Great Hall of the People in Beijing, China. The event opened on March 5, 2010 and concluded on March 14, 2010.

== Background ==
As usual the 2010 NPC commenced in tandem with the 2010 session of the Chinese People's Political Consultative Conference (CPPCC), a political advisory body with a broader representation from the population, government, industry, and special interest groups.

The meeting was focused on the economic recovery since the Great Recession, combating inflation and tightening of banking industry. There are items introduced such as reforming the electoral laws, poverty reduction and balanced economic development.

== The session ==
=== Agenda ===
The agenda for this year's NPC consisted of:

- State council work report delivered by Premier Wen Jiabao
- Work report of the NPC Standing Committee delivered by chairman of NPC Standing Committee Wu Bangguo
- Work report of the Supreme People's Court delivered by President of the Supreme People's Court Wang Shengjun
- Work report of the Supreme People's Procuratorate delivered by Procurator-General Cao Jianming

=== Government Work Report ===
Premier Wen issued his government's work report on Sunday, March 14, 2010. The report emphasized the need to maintain economic stability, growth and social stability. It is an important year to focus on economic growth which stood at around 8 percent, maintain unemployment at 4.6 percent and created 9 million jobs for urban residents.

The premier also rebuffed calls from the United States to revalue the Renminbi against the US dollar. He indicated his priorities was to maintain China's economic growth, exports and reduce unemployment. Wen claims the US was using foreign policy for its own protectionist measures such as depreciating its own currency to increase exports and asking others to appreciate their currencies.

=== NPC Standing Committee Work Report ===
Wu Bangguo the chairman of the NPC Standing Committee has reported the government has enacted Electoral Law, which grants equal representation in legislative bodies to rural and urban people. The government also has checked compliance with the 2009 Law on Food Safety and combating corruption on all levels.

=== Supreme People's Court Work Report ===
The President of the Supreme People's Court has reported in the annual session they have handled with 13,318 cases and concluded 11,749 cases. This is up 26.2 percent and 52.1 percent year on year. Local courts processed 11.37 million cases, up by 6.3 percent from last year.

=== Supreme People's Procuratorate Work Report ===
Prosecutor-General Cao Jianming reported to congress, 2009 saw reduction in official corruption. Cao Jianming stated 2,670 officials above county level last year, including eight at the provincial or ministerial level, were investigated for corruption last year. There were 41,000 officials investigated in total. This was down 3.3 percent from last year. 32,000 cases were related to embezzlement, bribery, dereliction of duty and other work-related crimes, this is up 0.9 percent from last year.

Around 4,000 corrupt officials have escaped to Canada, the United States, Australia and other countries with over $50 billion of public funds in the last three decades, according to statistics from the Ministry of Commerce.

Cao also indicated the prosecutors need to be self-disciplined and avoid being seen as part of the graft affecting all levels of government.

== Voting results ==
=== Resolutions ===
Topic	For	Against	Abstain	Rate
Premier Wen Jiabao's Government Work Report	2,836	36	25	97.89%
Election Law Amendment	2,747	108	47	94.66%
Report on the Implementation of the 2009 National Economic and Social Development Plan and the 2010 Draft Plan	2,704	138	59	93.21%
Report on the Execution of the Central and Local Budgets for 2009 and on the Draft Central and Local Budgets for 2010	2,458	317	116	85.02%
Chairman Wu Bangguo's NPCSC Work Report	2,828	43	31	95.86%
Chief Justice Wang Shengjun's Supreme People's Court Work Report	2,289	479	128	79.04%
Procurator-General Cao Jianming's Supreme People's Procuratorate Work Report	2,341	411	147	80.75%
Resignation of Li Dongsheng from the NPCSC	2,632	58	191	91.36%

== See also ==
- National People's Congress

Preceded by 2009 NPC	Annual National People's Congress Sessions of the People's Republic of China; March, 2010	Succeeded by 2011 NPC
