= Fifth session of the 11th National People's Congress =

Meeting in Beijing, China

2012 National People's Congress; 第十一届全国人民代表大会第五次会议; _{5th plenary session of the}; _{11th National People's Congress}; 5 March – 14 March
| President | Premier | Congress Chairman |
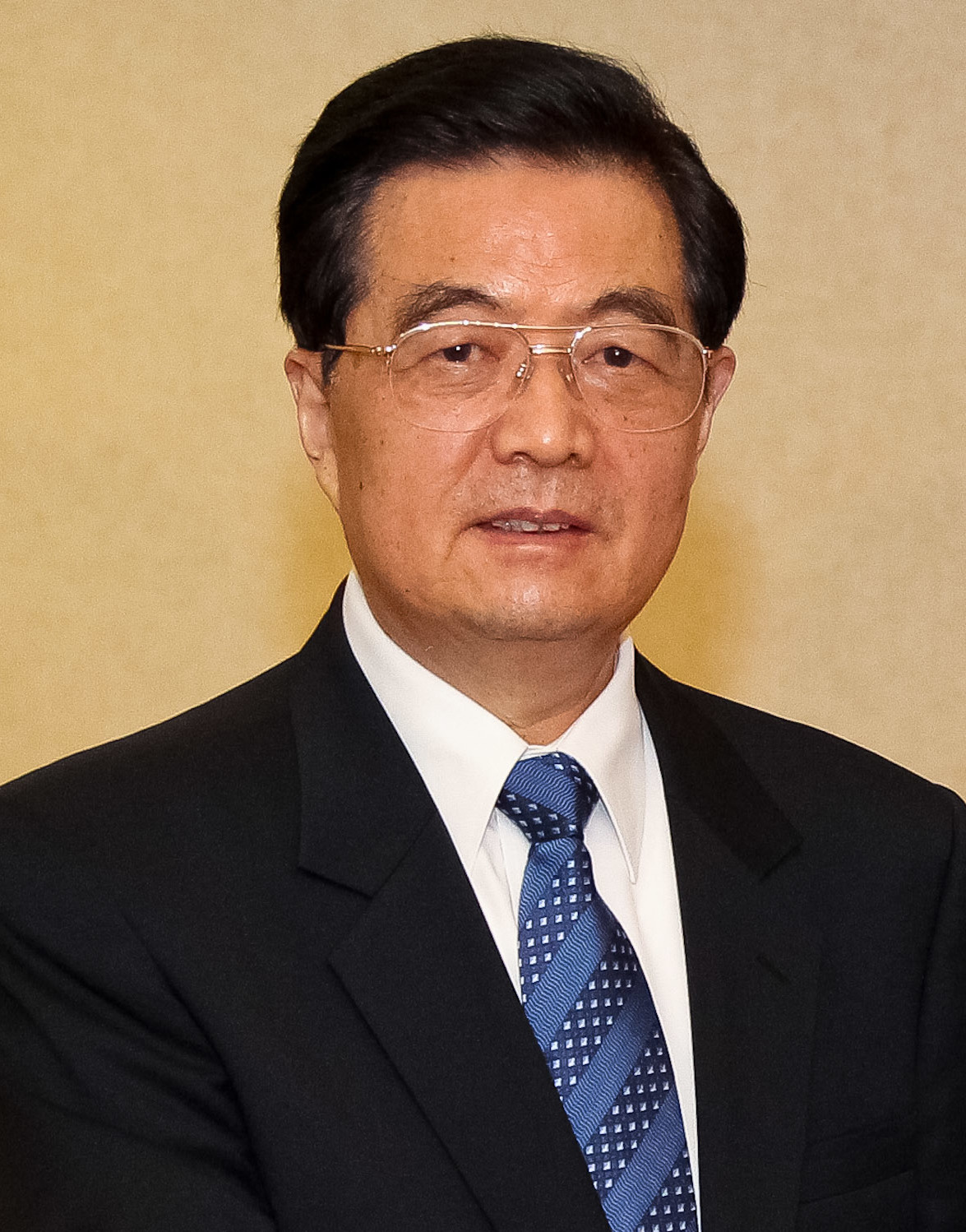
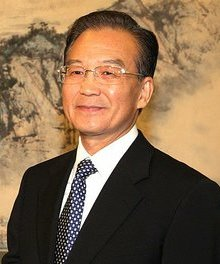
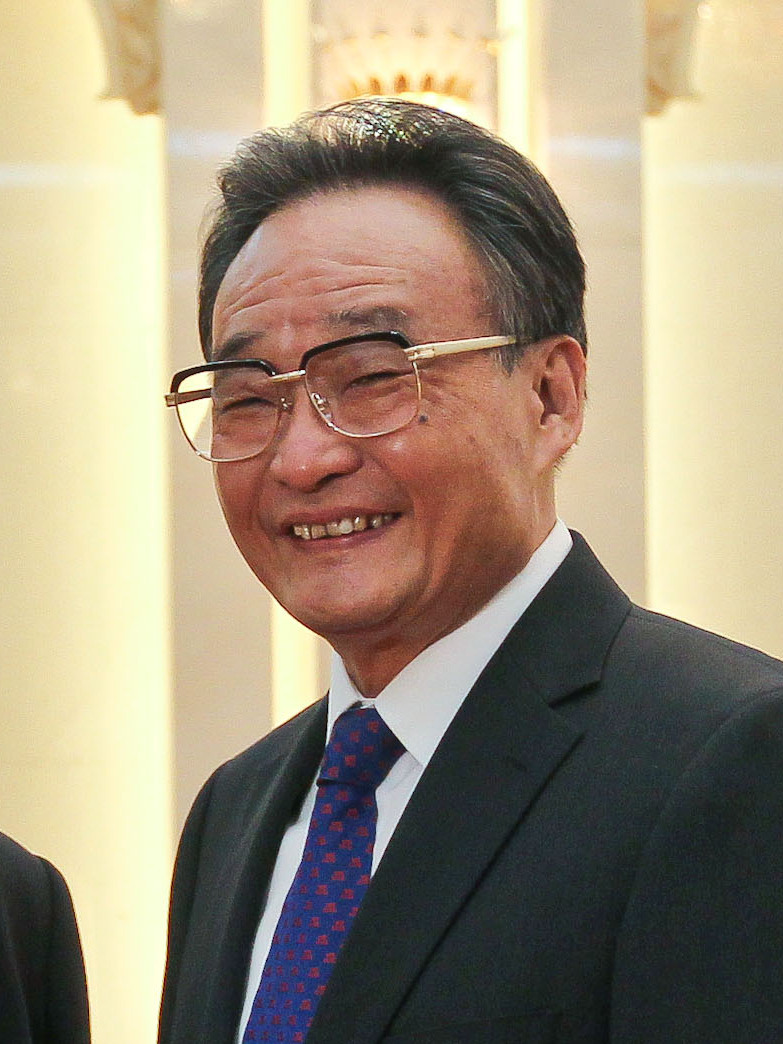
| Hu Jintao | Wen Jiabao | Wu Bangguo |
| since 15 March 2003 | since 16 March 2003 | since 15 March 2003 |

Website
- 2012 NPC official website

The fifth session of the 11th National People's Congress held its annual meeting in March 2012 at the Great Hall of the People in Beijing, China. The event opened on 5 March and concluded on 14 March. Premier Wen Jiabao delivered his work report as Premier.

== The session ==
=== Government work report ===
Premier Wen delivered the central government's work report on 5 March, stating GDP growth would be at 7.5 percent. This was slower than the 8 to 10 percent of preceding years and decades. The government was targeting inflation to be around 4 percent. Wen also indicated about 9 million new jobs would be created in towns and cities. The official urban unemployment rate was expected to be 4.6 percent or lower. He mentioned China's volume of total exports and imports had been projected to be about 10 percent. The central government would need to make further reforms in industrial restructuring, innovation, energy conservation, and emissions reduction, and real income increases for the people that are in line with economic growth.

The work report reflected the growing challenges of managing growth and subduing inflation while the Communist Party mapped out a leadership transition and at the same time maintaining high employment and a high emphasis on safeguarding stability.

=== Premier Wen's press conference ===
In that year's National People's Congress convention, there were intense domestic and international media interest on Premier Wen and his views as this was his last year in office, home stretch to retirement. The media also wanted to hear Premier Wen's assessment of his term in office, insights to the challenges to the future, and the legacy he would be leaving behind.

In the premier's last official press conference for his work report, he emphasized China required further economic and political reforms to keep the gains from over the years and keep on improving people's livelihoods. Wen alluded to the Cultural Revolution which was a travesty for the Chinese people and political reforms should still continue. He reflected there was a lot of unfinished business and regrets in his nine-year stint as premier. Wen was apologetic for the social and economic problems over the last decade and conceded there was room for improvements and took responsibility for it.

Wen also reiterated poignantly the investigation into the Wang Lijun incident in Chongqing had yielded significant progress and local authorities should ponder and learn from the incident. On 15 March 2012, Bo Xilai, the Chongqing party chief, had been replaced.

The premier stressed the new leadership will need to press on with political structural reform which are necessary to implement successful structural economic reforms.

== Voting results ==
=== Resolutions ===
| Topic | | For | Against | Abstain | Rate |
|---|---|---|---|---|---|
| Premier Wen Jiabao's Government Work Report | | 2,725 | 90 | 49 | 95.15% |
| 9th Criminal Procedure Law Amendment | | 2,639 | 160 | 57 | 92.40% |
| Report on the Implementation of the 2011 National Economic and Social Development Plan and the 2012 Draft Plan | | 2,591 | 185 | 81 | 90.69% |
| Report on the Execution of the Central and Local Budgets for 2011 and on the Draft Central and Local Budgets for 2012 | | 2,291 | 438 | 131 | 80.10% |
| Drafts of electing delegates for the next term | All | 2,712 | 109 | 35 | 94.96% |
| Drafts of electing delegates for the next term | Hong Kong | 2,804 | 37 | 17 | 98.21% |
| Drafts of electing delegates for the next term | Macau | 2,820 | 18 | 16 | 98.81% |
| Chairman Wu Bangguo's NPCSC Work Report | | 2,737 | 77 | 44 | 95.77% |
| Chief Justice Wang Shengjun's Supreme People's Court Work Report | | 2,311 | 429 | 115 | 80.95% |
| Procurator-General Cao Jianming's Supreme People's Procuratorate Work Report | | 2,349 | 393 | 112 | 82.31% |

| Preceded by 2011 NPC | Annual National People's Congress Sessions of the People's Republic of China; March 2011 | Succeeded by 2013 NPC |
