= Fourth session of the 11th National People's Congress =

2011 National People's Congress; 第十一届全国人民代表大会第四次会议; _{4th plenary session of the}; _{11th National People's Congress}; 5 March – 14 March
President	Premier	Congress Chairman
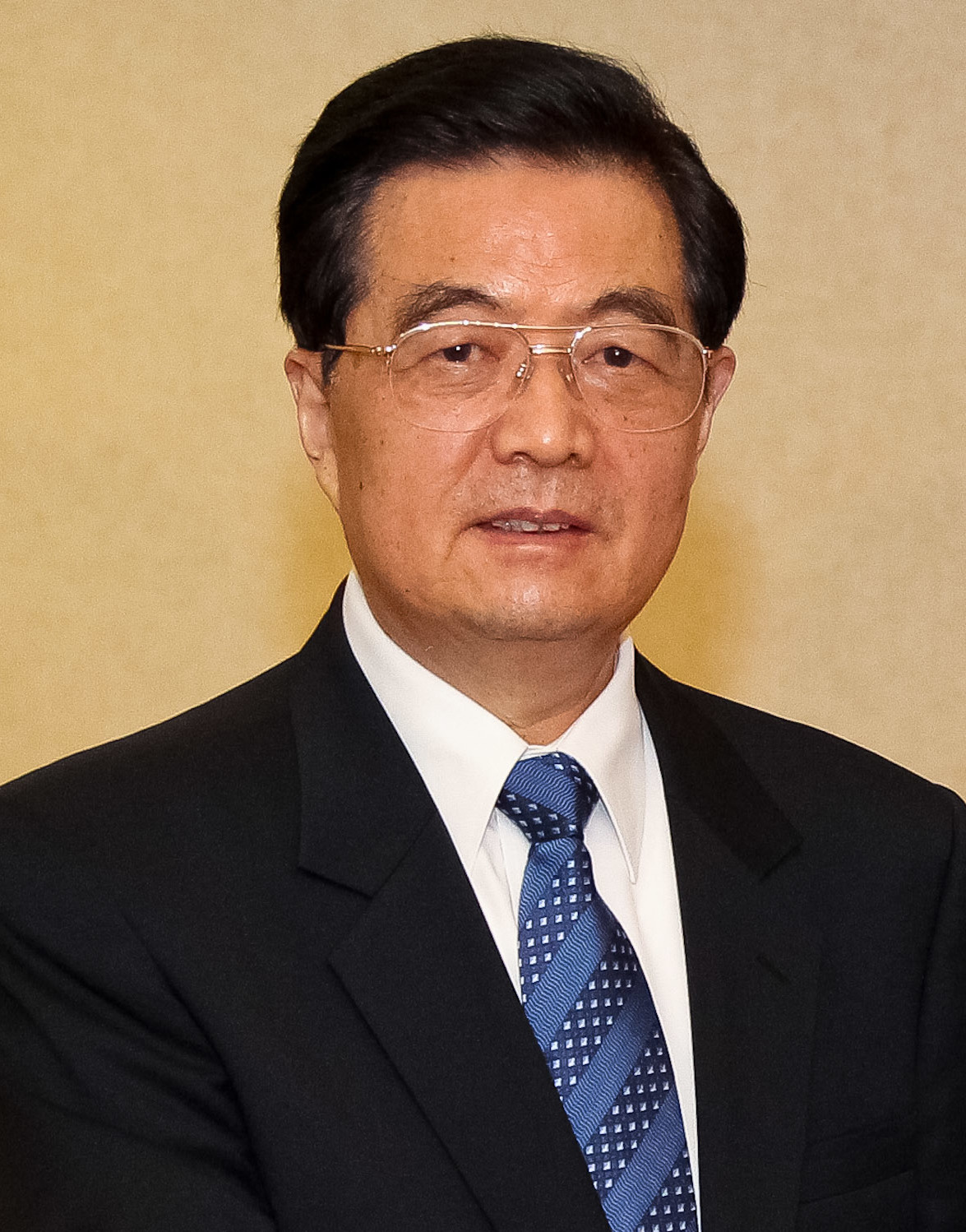
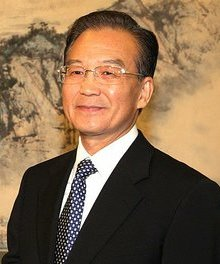
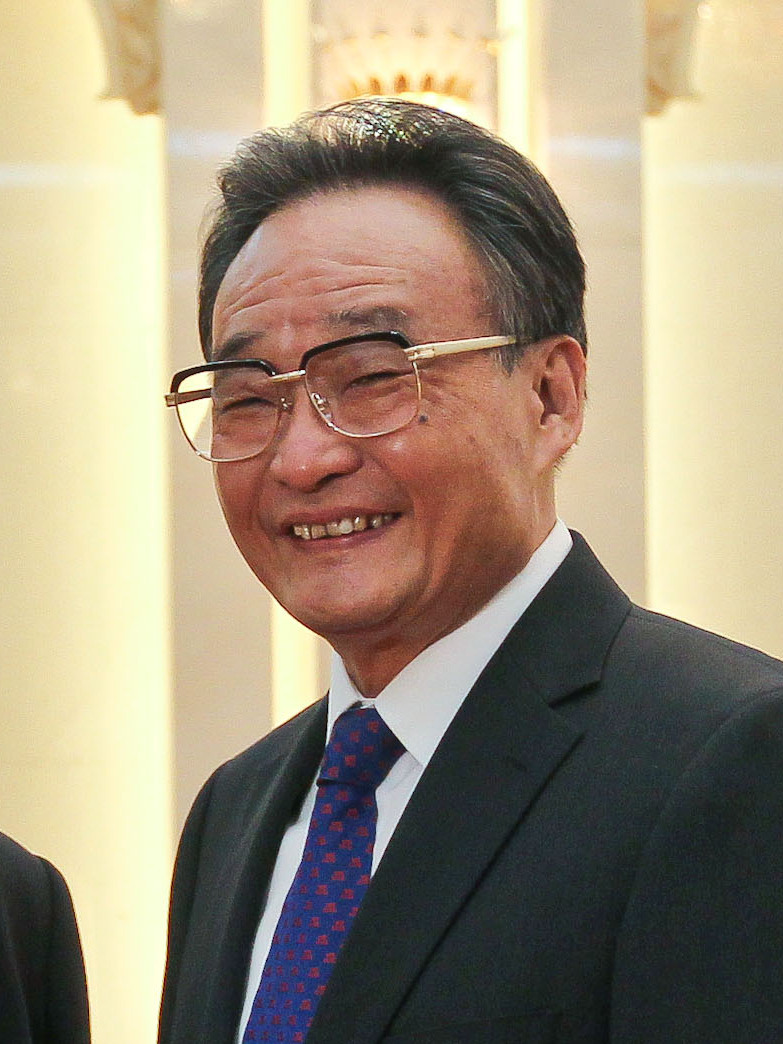
Hu Jintao	Wen Jiabao	Wu Bangguo
since 15 March 2003	since 16 March 2003	since 15 March 2003

Website
- 2011 NPC official website

The fourth session of the 11th National People's Congress held its annual meeting in March 2011 at the Great Hall of the People in Beijing, China. The event opened on 5 March and concluded on 14 March. The meeting was expected to approve the country's 12th Five Year Plan.

== The session ==
=== Premier's work report ===
Chinese premier Wen Jiabao delivered the central government's work report earlier in the meeting. Wen emphasised the need to maintain economic growth and challenges such as reducing the rich poor divide, reduced environmental degradation and boost domestic consumption.

The premier indicated China will reduce carbon emissions over the next five years in a response to climate change and improving environmental protection.

At the close of the session, Premier Wen stated the government will maintain a 7 percent economic growth over the next period between 2011 and 2015 The government will focus on addressing widening rural and urban disparity, investment and consumption issues, reining in property prices and curbing inflation. Wen also striking a good balance in the economy between growth, employment and inflation so the economy can track along economic prosperity and avoid recession

The premier also mentioned about the fight against corruption. The areas focused will be in construction, sale of land use rights, mineral resources exploration, stated-owed property management and government procurement. The government will established a system for officials to regularly declare their income, investment, property and resident status of their family members.

=== Procurator-General's report ===
Procurator-General Cao Jianming reported 2,723 corrupt officials were investigated in 2010. These officials were at the county levels and higher. The prosecutors charged 1,282 fugitives with work-related crimes in 2010. It also recovered money and goods to the value of 7.4 billion yuan.

== Voting results ==
=== Resolutions ===
Topic	For	Against	Abstain	Rate
Premier Wen Jiabao's Government Work Report	2,793	47	36	97.11%
Draft Outline of the 13th Five-Year Plan for National Economic and Social Development	2,778	59	38	96.63%
Report on the Implementation of the 2010 National Economic and Social Development Plan and the 2011 Draft Plan	2,709	119	45	94.29%
Report on the Execution of the Central and Local Budgets for 2010 and on the Draft Central and Local Budgets for 2011	2,391	362	118	83.28%
Chairman Wu Bangguo's NPCSC Work Report	2,756	82	37	95.86%
Chief Justice Wang Shengjun's Supreme People's Court Work Report	2,242	475	11	78.06%
Procurator-General Cao Jianming's Supreme People's Procuratorate Work Report	2,306	434	130	80.35%
Resignation of Ni Yuefeng from the NPCSC	2,635	81	14	92.10%

Preceded by 2010 NPC	Annual National People's Congress Sessions of the People's Republic of China; March 2011	Succeeded by 2012 NPC
