= First session of the 11th National People's Congress =

People's Republic of China National People's Congress meeting

2008 National People's Congress; 第十一届全国人民代表大会第一次会议; _{1st plenary session of the}; _{11th National People's Congress}; 5 March – 18 March
| President | Premier | Congress Chairman |
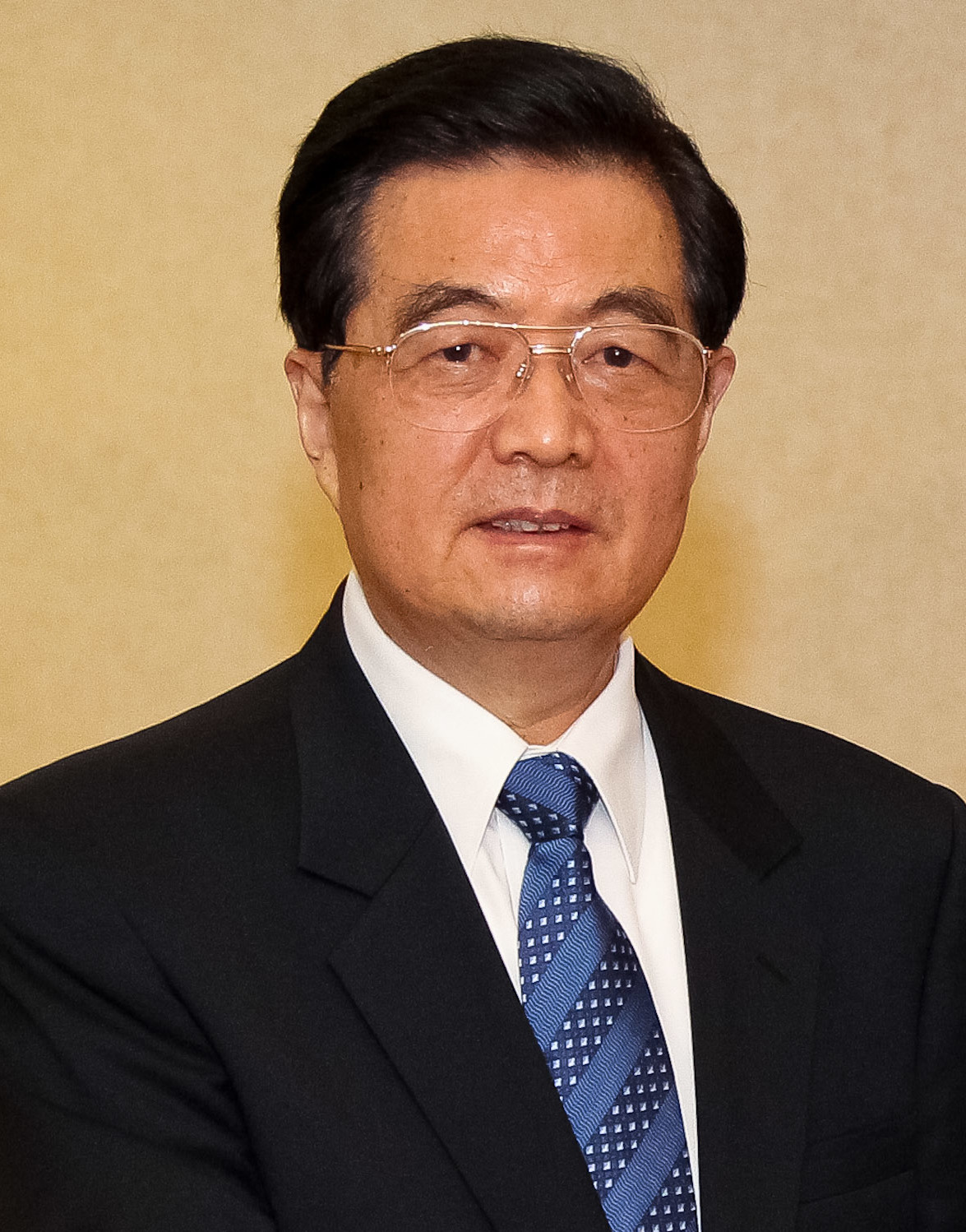
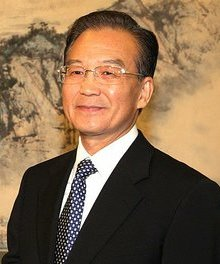
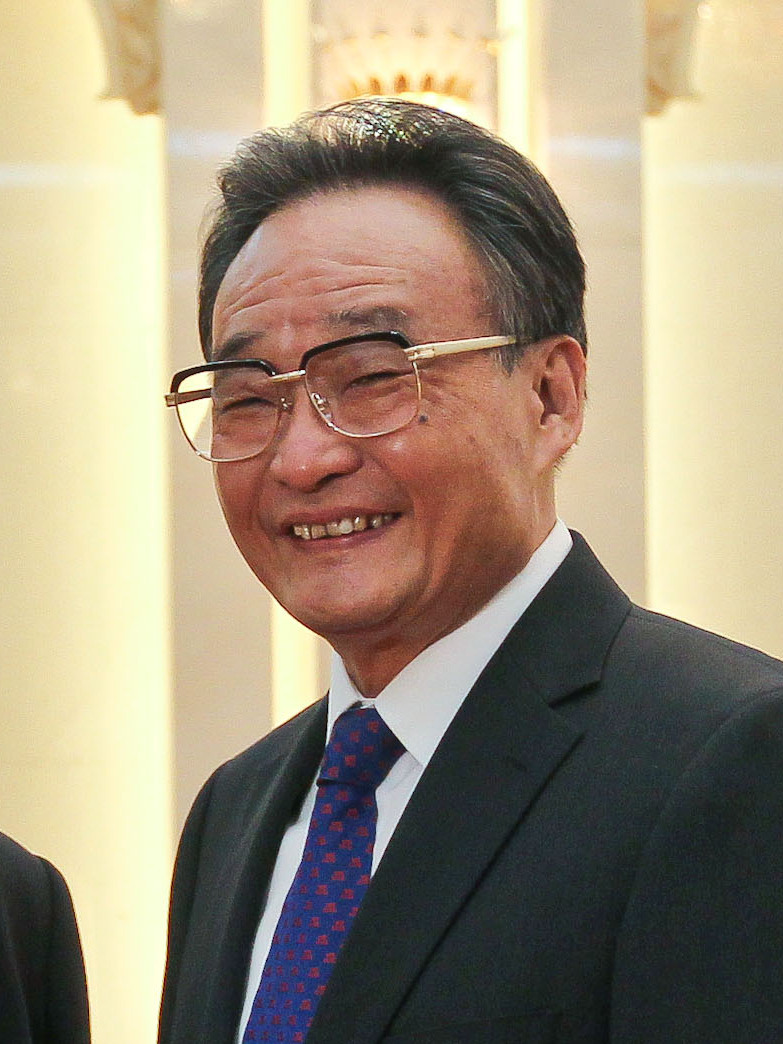
| Hu Jintao | Wen Jiabao | Wu Bangguo |
| since 15 March 2003 | since 16 March 2003 | since 15 March 2003 |
| President-elect | Premier-elect | Congress Chairman-elect |
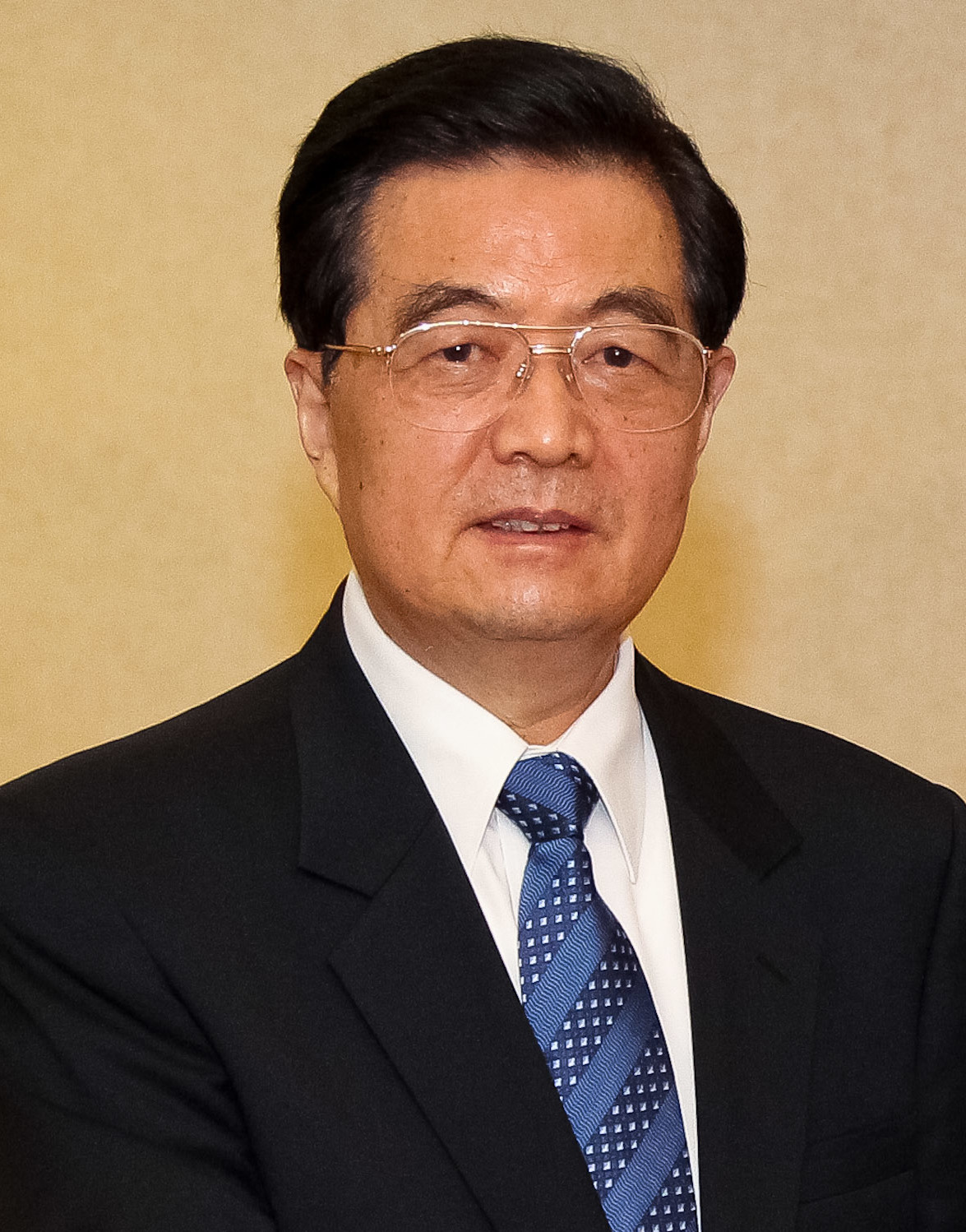
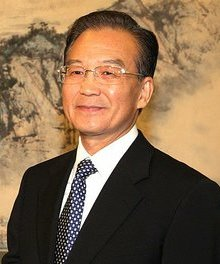
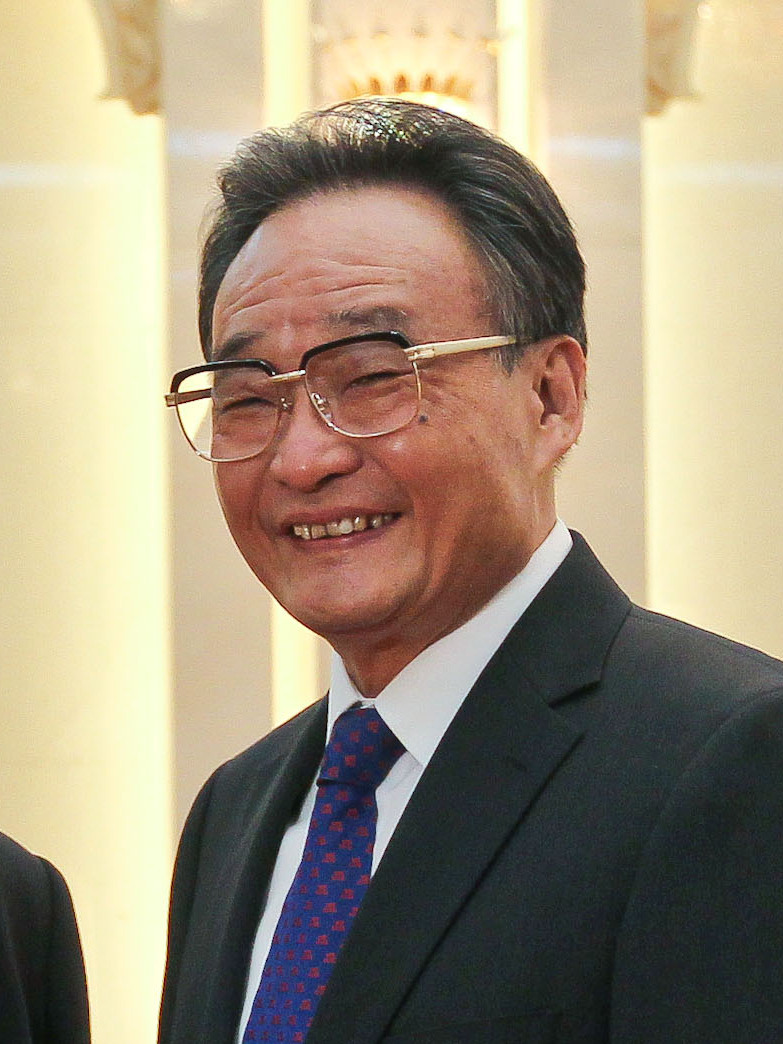
| Hu Jintao | Wen Jiabao | Wu Bangguo |

Website
- 2008 NPC official website

The first session of the 11th National People's Congress held its annual meeting from March 5 to March 18, 2008 in the Great Hall of the People in Beijing, China, in conjunction with the 2008 Chinese People's Political Consultative Conference.

The 10-day plenum elected China's new government leaders. Up for confirmation for a second term were President Hu Jintao and Premier Wen Jiabao. The State Council went through important personnel and structural changes following the 17th Party Congress. Zeng Qinghong's Vice-Presidency came to an end and the position was taken by Xi Jinping. Three new Vice-Premiers were confirmed and took office, with rising star Li Keqiang ranking first in this group.

== The session ==
=== Government Report ===
Premier Wen Jiabao delivered the government report on March 5, 2008, reviewing the work from the past five years. The main points that come out of the report were

- Rebuilding of snowstorm hit areas in Southern China. Rebuild power, communications and water infrastructure in Hunan, Anhui, Guangdong, Sichuan and Hebei.
- Control of inflation and maintain price stability for basic necessities, food and essential commodities.
- Regulation of excessive investments in fixed assets.
- Education reforms which include free nine years of education and education initiatives to assist with the rural regions.
- Increase resources towards energy conservation, more efficient technologies and reduction of emissions.

=== State Council reform ===
A massive reform took place in China's cabinet, the State Council of the People's Republic of China. Several ministries were consolidated to form super ministries. The several "superministries"

| New Ministry | Legacy depts | Areas of Responsibility | New sub agencies reporting |
|---|---|---|---|
| Ministry of Industry and Information | National Development and Research Commission (NDRC) the Commission of Science Technology and Industry for National Defense; Ministry of Information Industry; State Council Information Office; State Tobacco Monopoly Bureau | Internet; Mobile Telecom; Landline Telecom; Postal Services; Internet Security | State Postal Bureau |
| Ministry of Human Resources and Social Security | Ministry of Personnel; Ministry of Labour and Social Security | Employment; Social Services | State Bureau of Civil Servants |
| Ministry of Environmental Protection | State Environmental Protection Administration | Environmental Protection; Enforcement | n/a |
| Ministry of Housing and Urban-Rural Construction | Ministry of Construction | Housing; Rural; Urban | n/a |
| Ministry of Transport | Ministry of Communications; Civil Aviation Administration of China | Road Transport; Air Transport; Water safety and Shipping | State Civil Aviation Bureau |

The State Council also created the National Energy Commission which oversaw national energy strategy, security and development. While the National Development and Reform Commission continued to control the administration and regulation of the energy sector. The State Food and Drug Administration was incorporated and came under the jurisdiction of the Ministry of Health. Therefore, the Health ministry took over the responsibility for food and drug safety. The People's Bank of China increased its coordination role between all the financial executive agencies, namely the National Development and Reform Commission and the Finance ministry.

=== Premier's Press Conference ===
Premier Wen Jiabao held a press conference on March 18, 2008. He introduced the new Vice-Premiers, Li Keqiang, Hui Liangyu, Zhang Dejiang and Wang Qishan. Wen addressed the direction of the government in the next five years. He also addressed the ongoing Tibetan protests. Wen asserted that the Dalai Lama was "masterminding" the protests in Tibet. Wen said that 2008 could be a very difficult year for the Chinese economy because of both international and domestic reasons.

== Voting results ==
=== State positions ===
| NPCSC Chairman Election | | | | NPCSC Secretary-general Election | | | |
| Candidates | For | Against | Abstain | Candidates | For | Against | Abstain |
|---|---|---|---|---|---|---|---|
| Wu Bangguo | 2,948 | 9 | 9 | Li Jianguo | 2,932 | 25 | 8 |
| Presidential Election | | | | Vice-Presidential Election | | | |
| Candidates | For | Against | Abstain | Candidates | For | Against | Abstain |
| Hu Jintao | 2,956 | 3 | 5 | Xi Jinping | 2,919 | 28 | 17 |
| CMC Chairmanship Election | | | | Premiership Nomination | | | |
| Candidates | For | Against | Abstain | Candidates | For | Against | Abstain |
| Hu Jintao | 2,959 | 4 | 4 | Wen Jiabao | 2,926 | 21 | 12 |
| Supreme Court President Election | | | | Procurator-general Election | | | |
| Candidates | For | Against | Abstain | Candidates | For | Against | Abstain |
| Wang Shengjun | 2,885 | 36 | 44 | Cao Jianming | 2,933 | 16 | 17 |

- No other candidates formally stood for these positions, although votes were cast for other write-in candidates.

=== Resolutions ===
| Topic | For | Against | Abstain | Rate |
|---|---|---|---|---|
| Premier Wen Jiabao's Government Work Report | 2,885 | 32 | 12 | 98.50% |
| State Council Institutional Reform Plan | 2,744 | 117 | 99 | 92.70% |
| Report on the Implementation of the 2007 National Economic and Social Development Plan and the 2008 Draft Plan | 2,747 | 125 | 55 | 93.85% |
| Report on the Execution of the Central and Local Budgets for 2007 and on the Draft Central and Local Budgets for 2008 | 2,462 | 362 | 102 | 84.14% |
| Chairman Wu Bangguo's NPCSC Work Report | 2,846 | 57 | 23 | 97.27% |
| Chief Justice Wang Shengjun's Supreme People's Court Work Report | 2,287 | 521 | 120 | 78.11% |
| Procurator-General Jia Chunwang's Supreme People's Procuratorate Work Report | 2,270 | 514 | 142 | 77.58% |

== Notes ==
| Preceded by 2007 NPC | Annual National People's Congress Sessions of the People's Republic of China; March 5—18, 2008 | Succeeded by 2009 NPC |
