= Second session of the 11th National People's Congress =

2009 National People's Congress; 第十一届全国人民代表大会第二次会议; _{2nd plenary session of the}; _{11th National People's Congress}; 5 March – 13 March
| President | Premier | Congress Chairman |
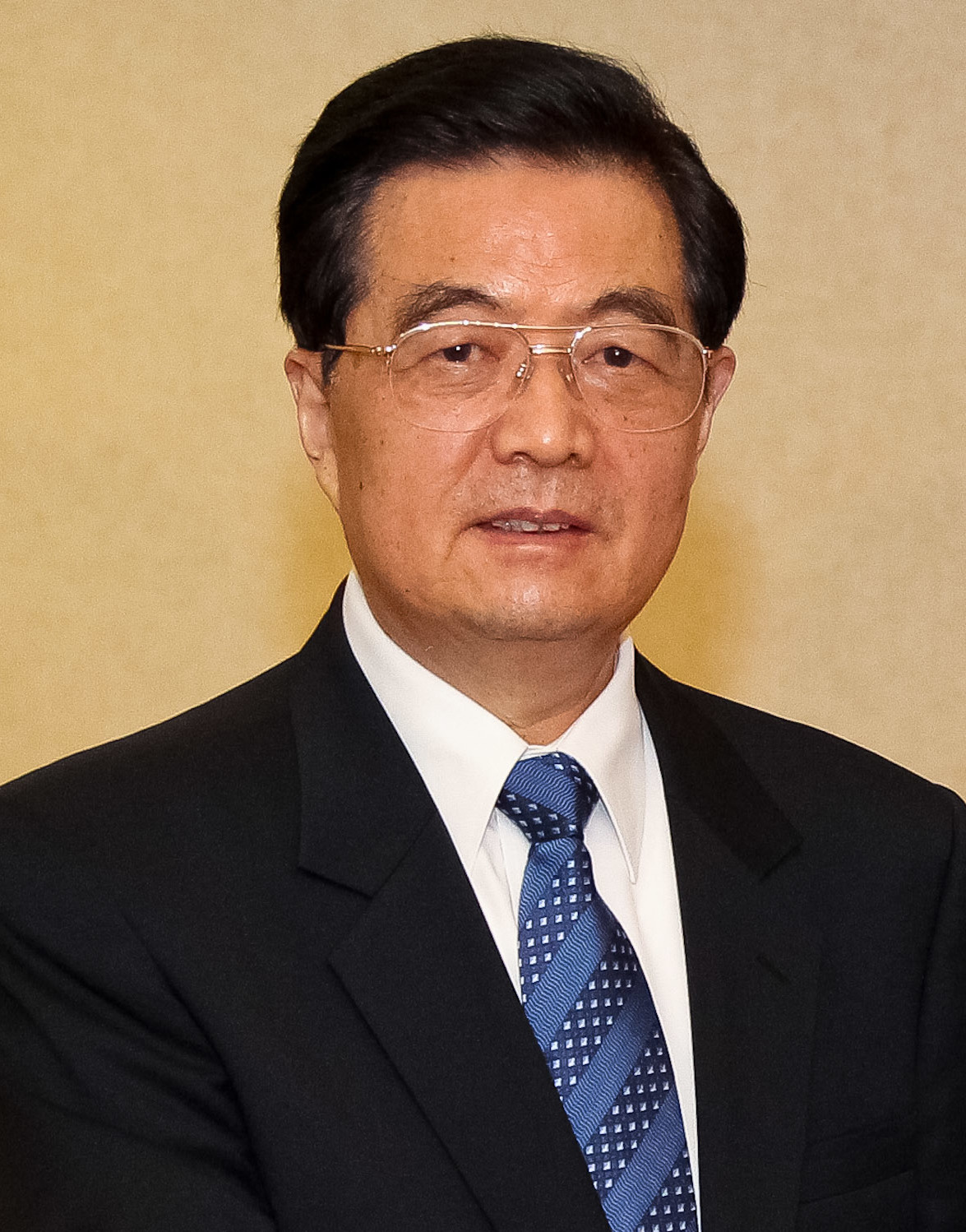
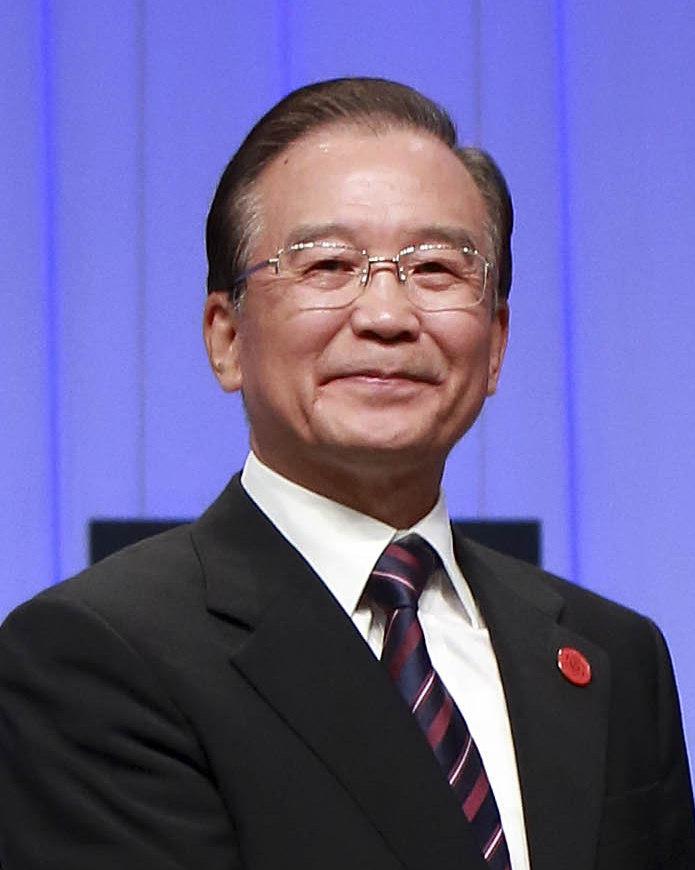
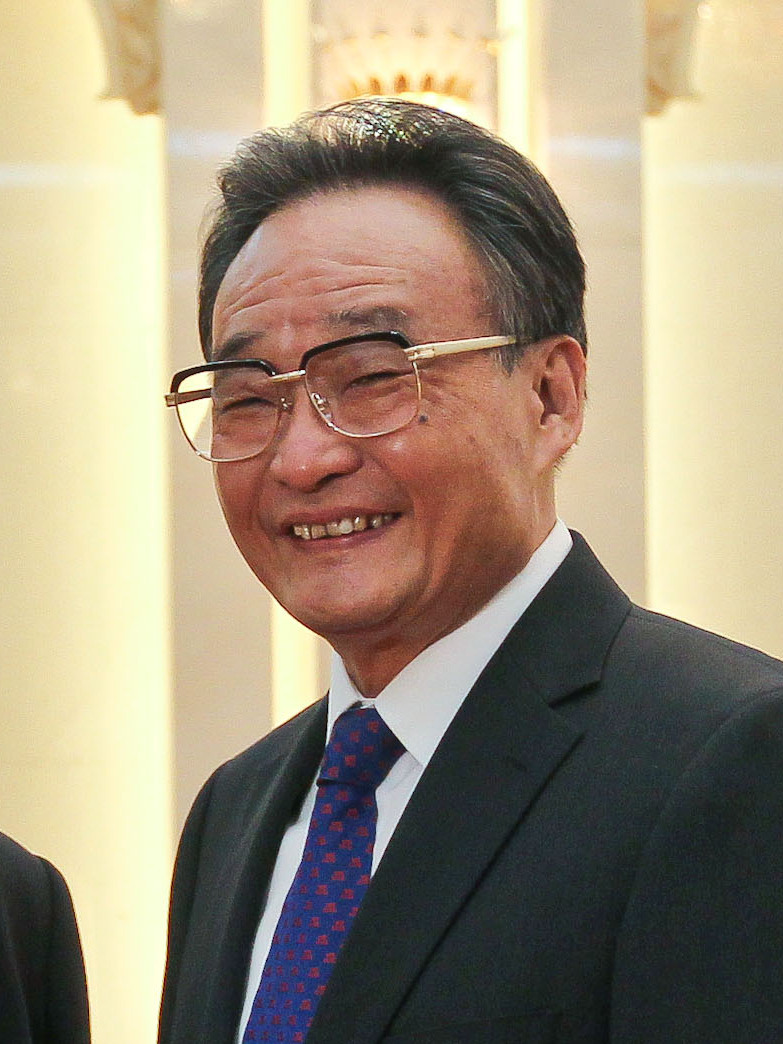
| Hu Jintao | Wen Jiabao | Wu Bangguo |
| since 15 March 2003 | since 16 March 2003 | since 15 March 2003 |

Website
- 2009 NPC official website

The second session of the 11th National People's Congress was the annual meeting of the highest legislative body of the People's Republic of China, which was held in March 2009 at the Great Hall of the People in Beijing. The event began on March 5 and lasted until March 13. The 11th National People's Congress was followed closely because of the possible impact any policy changes would have on the Chinese and world economy. Major issues discussed at the Congress include the 2008 financial crisis, economy of China, curbing unemployment, and social welfare.

Highlights of the Congress included Premier Wen Jiabao's expression of confidence in the growth of China's economy in 2009, conciliatory remarks towards Taiwan from Beijing, NPC Standing Committee Chairman Wu Bangguo's reiteration that China will not adopt Western-style democracy, and Wen's expressed doubts about U.S. treasury securities. The main issues raised by delegates included a strategy to adopt to face the current economic slowdown, the ways to continue to improve population's life standards (jobs, health), and continue efforts against corruption.

== Background ==
The 2009 NPC took place alongside the 2009 session of the Chinese People's Political Consultative Conference (CPPCC), a political advisory body with little practical power. In recent years, however, there has been a marked rise in the amount of debate within both bodies. It took place during the Great Recession, the first such crisis of this proportion China has faced since economic liberalization under Deng Xiaoping in 1978. A day prior to the Congress, the government announced a 14.9% increase in the Chinese defense budget, 3% less than the previous year. There was also speculation of the unveiling of another stimulus package, which affected trading on global stock markets on March 4. The timeline was shortened due to the 2008 financial crisis.

== The session ==
=== Agenda ===
The agenda for this year's NPC consisted of:

- State council work report delivered by Premier Wen Jiabao
- Report on the Implementation of the 2008 Plan for National Economic and Social Development and the Report on the draft 2009 Plan for National Economic and Social Development; and voting on the 2009 plan
- Report on the Implementation of the Central and Local Budgets for 2008 and on the Draft Central and Local Budgets for 2009; and voting on the 2009 central budget
- Work report of the NPC Standing Committee delivered by chairman of NPC Standing Committee Wu Bangguo
- Work report of the Supreme People's Court delivered by President of the Supreme People's Court Wang Shengjun
- Work report of the Supreme People's Procuratorate delivered by Procurator-General Cao Jianming

=== Premier's Work Report ===
The Premier, Wen Jiabao, delivered the annual Government Work Report on March 5, 2009. This annual speech details the government's policy and legislative agenda for the past and coming year (roughly analogous to the State of the Union address and Throne Speeches in some other countries). While acknowledging the Great Recession, Wen declared that China would aim for a GDP growth of 8% in the coming year. Wen revealed that the central government deficit hovers around 750 billion yuan ($US109.63 billion), 570 billion yuan more than last year. The total deficit will amount to 950 billion yuan ($US139 billion) as local governments plan to issue 200 billion yuan worth of government bonds. Although this is a relatively large deficit by Chinese standards, it only accounts for less than 3% of the GDP.

Wen pointed to improvements in cross-strait relations between mainland China and Taiwan, and declared that the two sides have entered a "peaceful period". He remarked that new agreements on economic cooperation will be signed in the coming year. To address reconstruction after the deadly Sichuan earthquake in May 2008, the central government will allocate 130 billion yuan to accelerate recovery in hard-hit areas in Sichuan province. In health care reform, Wen stressed that governments at all levels will allocate an additional 850 billion yuan in the next three years, including 331.8 billion yuan directly from the central government.

=== NPC Standing Committee Work Report ===
The Chair of the NPC, Wu Bangguo, delivered his report on the work of the National People's Congress over the past year. He spoke on the continuing reconstruction of the Sichuan earthquake and progress of relief work, and empathized with the victims. On the economy, he touched on the slowing economy due to the Great Recession, increased unemployment and risk to social stability if proper oversight is not increased in areas of food safety, standards and reporting.

The NPC standing committee chairman also stressed oversight of the economic stimulus package through the legislature, increased domestic consumption, and upgrading industry and competitiveness in this difficult economic period.

Wu also stated China cannot indiscriminately copy western political concepts such as multi-party governance, separation of powers namely the executive, legislative and judicial branch, or turning the NPC into a bicameral system. China's political reforms rest with improving and developing the socialist political system which includes the NPC.

=== President of the Supreme People's Court Work Report ===
China's top judicial official, Wang Shengjun reported the continuing efforts to educate judges on judicial work ethic and root out corruption. Wang mentioned judicial corruption severely undermined the credibility of the judicial system and led to social repercussions.

A total of 712 judicial officials from courts throughout China were prosecuted for violations of the laws in 2008, Wang said. Out of the 712, 105 faced criminal prosecutions. He indicated, in 2008, the Supreme People's Court dealt with over 10,000 cases, up nearly 30 percent from 2007. Local courts processed over 10 million cases, up nearly 11 percent.

=== Prosecutor General's Work Report ===
China's Prosecutor-General Cao Jianming stated the central government will step up the inspection of prisons, with more resources and surprise checks, to prevent inmates from being bullied or tortured. The main points that came up from Cao's work report are:

- Increase efforts to provide judicial support to maintain the steady growth of the national economy by actively pursuing criminal cases by the public prosecutor's office.
- Step up efforts to maintain social harmony and stability through strict law enforcement.
- Give importance to public safety and their livelihood through better legal oversight of the food industry. This includes the production and sale of poisonous and harmful food and medicine. In addition, investigate negligence and accountability in cases where there is a breach of workplace safety and food security.
- Strengthen legal oversight over litigation for maintaining and promoting judicial justice.
- Improve the transparency and credibility of law enforcement by procuratorial organs.
- Improve the competence of procurators.

Cai acknowledge in 2008, the total number of arrest came up to 952,583 suspects for numerous crimes and 1,143,897 were prosecuted. This was an increase of 3.5 percent and 5.7 percent from the last year.

==== Efforts against corruption ====
There were 33,546 cases relating to corruption, misconduct and violation on people's human rights investigated. This involved 41,179 people. The total prosecuted were 33,953 people involved in 26,684 such cases. Out of the total there were 17,594 serious corruption cases, 3,211 major cases of misconduct and violations on people's human rights, and 2,687 officials at all levels of public office.

The prosecutor general also indicated 10,315 cases of commercial bribery committed by government officials were investigated. This involved a total sum of more than 2.1 billion yuan.

=== Premier's press conference ===
On March 13 Premier Wen Jiabao held the annual NPC press conference to a gallery of domestic and international reporters. Wen remarked that the 2008 financial crisis was an extraordinary situation. China has over half of its estimated $2 trillion of foreign exchange holdings in United States Treasury securities and other U.S. government debt and Wen remarked, "We have lent a huge amount of money to the U.S. Of course we are concerned about the safety of our assets. To be honest, I am definitely a little worried." Wen asked the U.S. to "maintain its good credit, to honor its promises and to guarantee the safety of China's assets". In particular, Wen was confident that China's economy would continue to grow at a rate of 8% in 2009. Wen played down speculation that the 1.18 trillion Yuan of central government stimulus is not completely directed to new investments, and that the government was ready to make new stimulus plans if need be in the future. Wen also mentioned his aspiration to visit Taiwan.

== Voting results ==
=== Resolutions ===
| Topic | For | Against | Abstain | Rate |
|---|---|---|---|---|
| Premier Wen Jiabao's Government Work Report | 2,824 | 42 | 22 | 97.78% |
| Report on the Implementation of the 2008 National Economic and Social Development Plan and the 2009 Draft Plan | 2,669 | 145 | 71 | 91.56% |
| Report on the Execution of the Central and Local Budgets for 2008 and on the Draft Central and Local Budgets for 2009 | 2,440 | 315 | 124 | 84.75% |
| Chairman Wu Bangguo's NPCSC Work Report | 2,721 | 99 | 68 | 94.22% |
| Chief Justice Wang Shengjun's Supreme People's Court Work Report | 2,172 | 519 | 192 | 75.34% |
| Procurator-General Cao Jianming's Supreme People's Procuratorate Work Report | 2,210 | 505 | 162 | 76.82% |

| Preceded by 2008 NPC | Annual National People's Congress Sessions of the People's Republic of China; March, 2009 | Succeeded by 2010 NPC |
