= First session of the 10th National People's Congress =

Session of China's National People's Congress

2003 National People's Congress; 第十届全国人民代表大会第一次会议; _{1st plenary session of the}; _{10th National People's Congress}; 5 March – 18 March
President	Premier	Congress Chairman
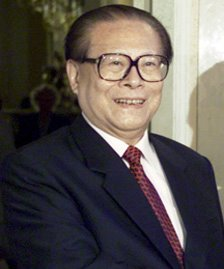
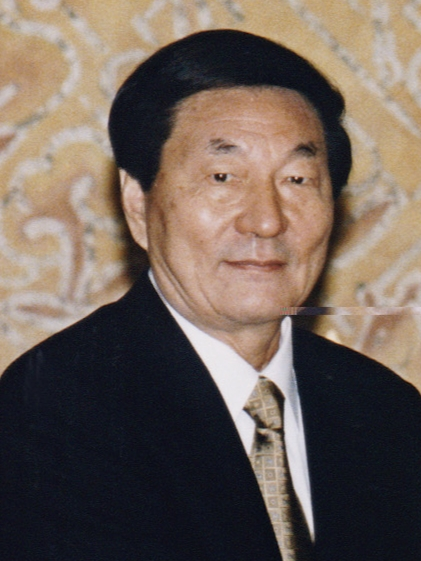
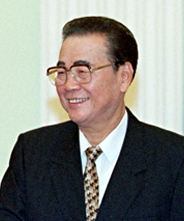
Jiang Zemin	Zhu Rongji	Li Peng
since 27 March 1993	since 17 March 1998	since 15 March 1998
President-elect	Premier-elect	Congress Chairman-elect
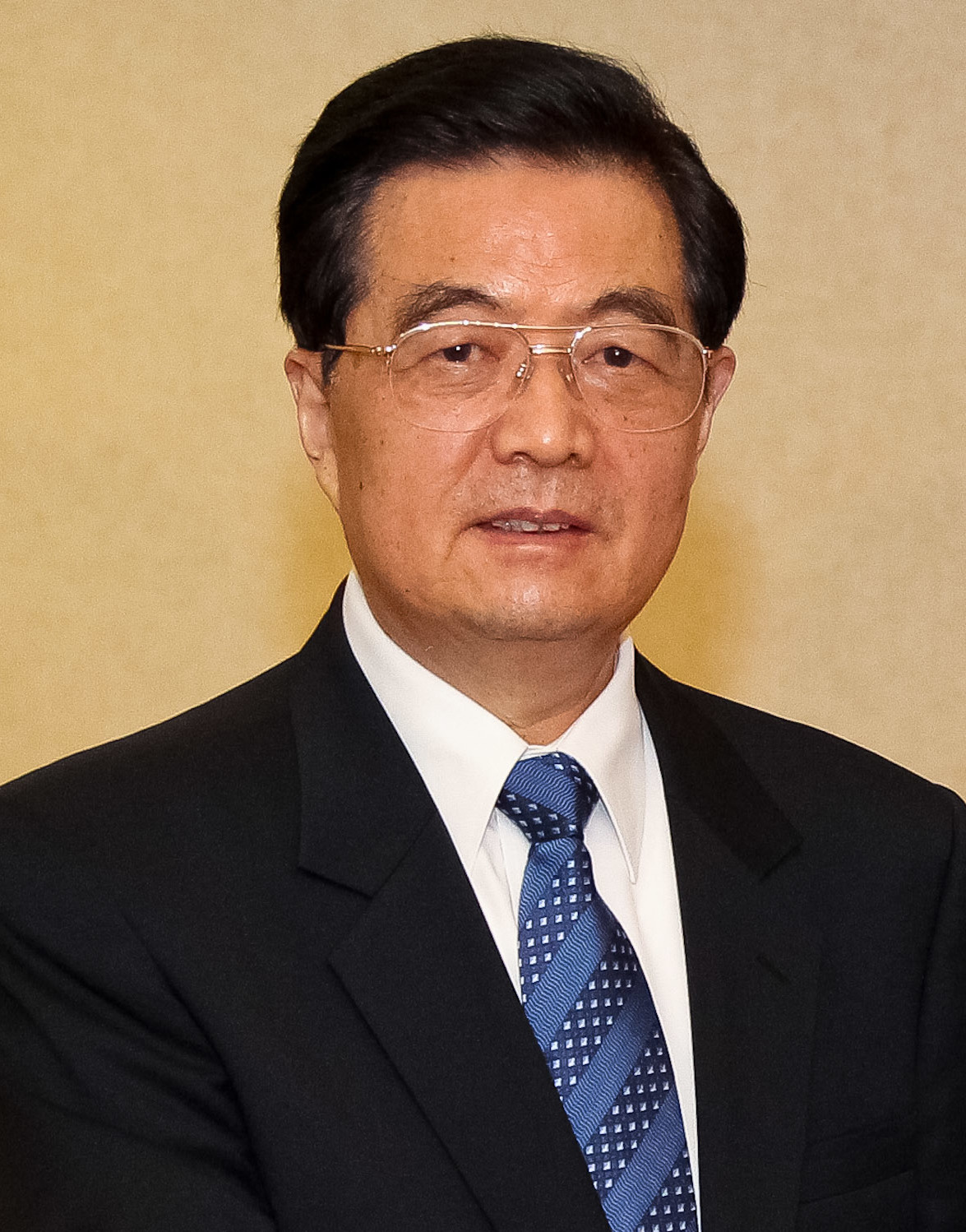
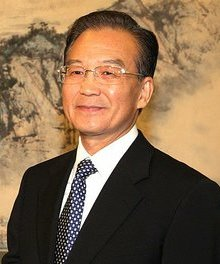
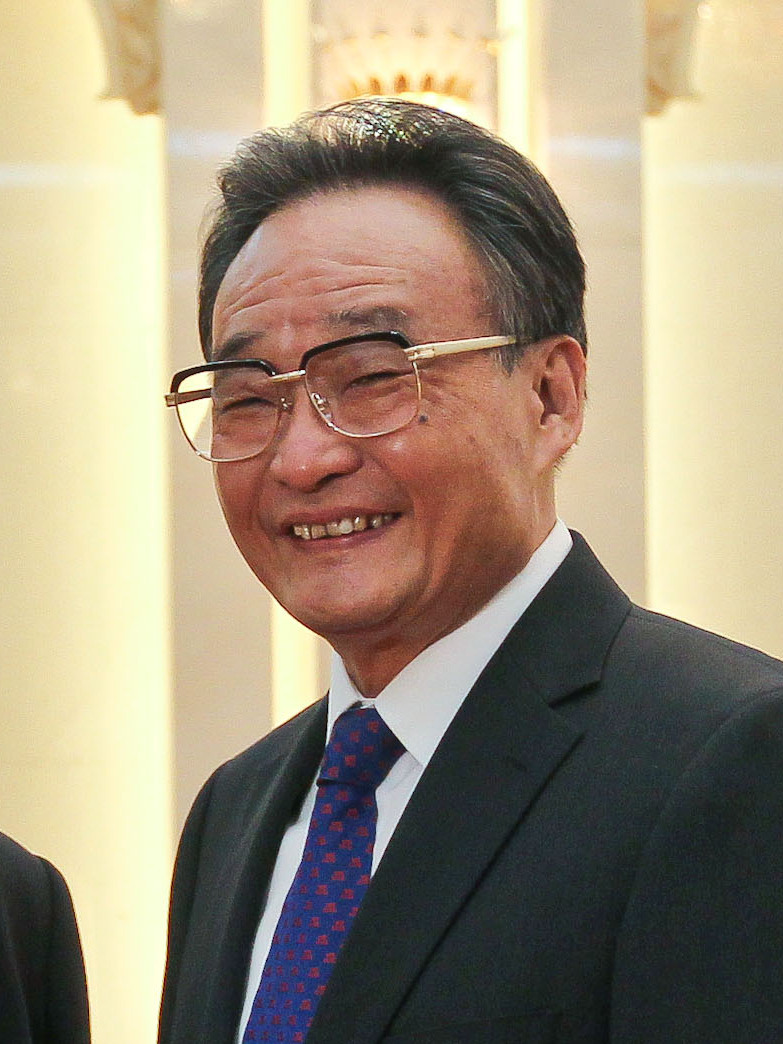
Hu Jintao	Wen Jiabao	Wu Bangguo

The first session of the 10th National People's Congress was held from March 5 to March 18 in Beijing, China, in conjunction with the 2003 session of the Chinese People's Political Consultative Conference.

== Appointments ==
The 2953 delegates of the Congress elected the following state leaders:

- President of China: Hu Jintao
- Vice-President of China: Zeng Qinghong
- Chairman of the Standing Committee of the National People's Congress: Wu Bangguo
- Chairman of the Central Military Commission: Jiang Zemin
- President of the Supreme People's Court: Xiao Yang
- Procurator-General of the Supreme People's Procuratorate: Jia Chunwang (贾春旺)

The delegates appointed the following state officers:

- Premier of China: Wen Jiabao
- Vice Premiers: Huang Ju, Wu Yi, Zeng Peiyan, Hui Liangyu
- State Councilors: Zhou Yongkang, Cao Gangchuan, Tang Jiaxuan, Hua Jianmin, Chen Zhili
- Secretary General of the State Council: Hua Jianmin (华建敏)

The delegates also approved the following nominations by the new Premier:

- Minister of Foreign Affairs: Li Zhaoxing (李肇星)
- Minister of National Defence: Cao Gangchuan
- Director of National Development and Reform Commission: Ma Kai
- Minister of Education: Zhou Ji (周济)
- Minister of Science and Technology: Xu Guanhua
- Director of State Commission of Science, Technology and Industry for National Defense: Zhang Yunchuan (张云川)
- Director of State Ethnic Affairs Commission: Li Dezhu (李德洙)
- Minister of Public Security: Zhou Yongkang
- Minister of State Security: Xu Yongyue
- Minister of Supervision: Li Zhilun (李至伦)
- Minister of Civil Affairs: Li Xueju (李学举)
- Minister of Justice: Zhang Fusen
- Minister of Finance: Jin Renqing (金人庆)
- Minister of Personnel: Zhang Bolin (张柏林)
- Minister of Labor and Social Security: Zheng Silin (郑斯林)
- Minister of Land and Resources: Tian Fengshan (田凤山)
- Minister of Construction: Wang Guotao (汪光焘)
- Minister of Railway: Liu Zhijun
- Minister of Communications: Zhang Chunxian (张春贤)
- Minister of Information Industry: Wang Xudong (王旭东)
- Minister of Water Resources: Wang Shucheng (汪恕诚)
- Minister of Agriculture: Du Qinglin (杜青林)
- Minister of Commerce: Lu Fuyuan (吕福源)
- Minister of Culture: Sun Jiazheng (孙家正)
- Minister of Health: Zhang Wenkang (张文康)
- Director of National Population and Family Planning Commission: Zhang Weiqing (张维庆)
- President of the People's Bank of China: Zhou Xiaochuan
- Auditor General of the National Audit Office: Li Jinhua

Preceded by 2002 NPC	Annual National People's Congress Sessions of the People's Republic of China; March 5—18, 2003	Succeeded by 2004 NPC
