= Sun Jiadong =

Chinese aerospace engineer

- 孙家栋
- Born: 8 April 1929 (age 97); Wafangdian, Liaoning, Republic of China
- Education: Harbin Institute of Technology; Zhukovsky Air Force Engineering Academy
- Awards: Highest Science and Technology Award (2009); Medal of the Republic (2019)
- Scientific career
- Fields: Satellite

Chinese name
- Simplified Chinese: 孙家栋
- Traditional Chinese: 孫家棟
Transcriptions
Standard Mandarin
- Hanyu Pinyin: Sūn Jiādòng

Sun Jiadong (Chinese: 孙家栋; born 8 April 1929) is a Chinese aerospace engineer who is an expert in carrier rocket and satellite technology. He has long served as a leader of Chinese satellite projects, and is currently the chief designer for the Chinese Lunar Exploration Program. Sun is a member of the Chinese Academy of Sciences and of the International Academy of Astronautics. Jiadong is also known as the " Father of Chinese Satellites".

Sun was bestowed the Medal of the Republic, the highest honorary medal of the People's Republic of China, in September 2019.

== Early life ==
Sun was born in Fu County, Liaoning on 8 April 1929. He enrolled in the Harbin Institute of Technology to begin preparatory courses in Russian when he was 18. Later he transferred to the automotive department. Around the time of the Chinese air force formation, he was chosen to join the army as a Russian translator. In 1951, Sun and 29 other soldiers were sent to study aircraft engines at the Zhukovsky Air Force Academy in the Soviet Union. In 1958, Sun graduated "with highest honor" and returned to China.

== Career ==
After returning to China, Sun served in the Fifth Research Institute of the Ministry of National Defense, conducting missile research. In 1967, he was appointed by Qian Xuesen to restructure the staff for satellite research. In addition to being in charge of the general design project for China's first satellite, he also worked as the technical superintendent and general designer for both China's first remote sensing satellite and recoverable satellite. He was also the chief designer of a second generation of special application satellites, such as communication, meteorological, and earth resource detecting satellites, as well as the Beidou-2 navigation system.

During the Cultural Revolution, Sun was appointed as the chief scientist of the Chinese satellite project. On April 24, 1970, the first Chinese space satellite, Dong Fang Hong I, was successfully launched. On March 3, 1971, the satellite "Shi Jian I" was launched. In 1975, China's first returning satellite was successfully launched. In 1984, China's first synchronized experimental communication satellite, Dong Fang Hong II was launched. Sun was the chief designer of all of them.

He was elected Member of the Chinese Academy of Sciences in 1991.

Since 2003, he has been the chief designer for the Chinese Lunar Exploration Program (CLEP).

== Awards and honours ==
- 1980 the honorary title of a working model in No 7 Engineering Industry Department
- 1984 the First-Class Merit Citation by the Ministry Of Aeronautics And Astronautics
- 1985 two special awards, among them the National Prize for Progress in Science and Technology
- 1999 "Two Bombs, One Satellite" Meritorious Award
- 2009 National Science and Technology Award
- 2019 Order of the Republic
