= Fifth session of the 13th National People's Congress =

Election session in China

2022 National People's Congress; 第十三届全国人民代表大会第五次会议; _{5th plenary session of the}; _{13th National People's Congress}; 5 March – 11 March
President	Premier	Congress Chairman
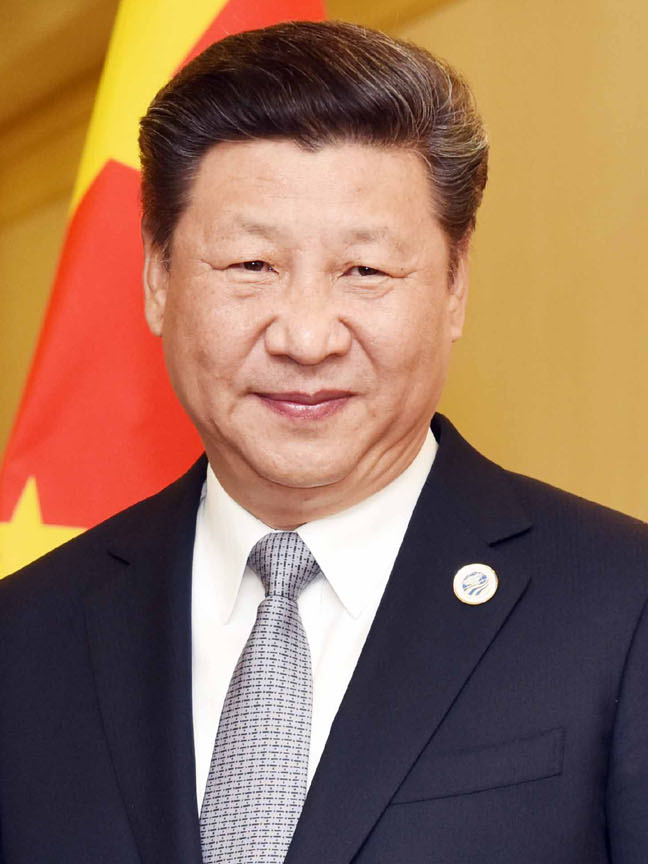
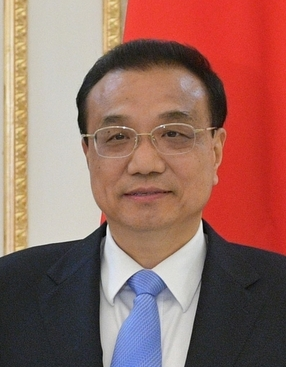
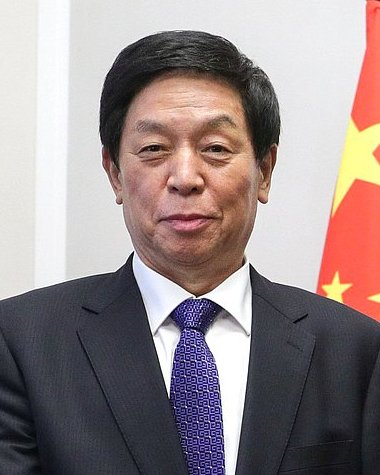
Xi Jinping	Li Keqiang	Li Zhanshu
since 14 March 2013	since 15 March 2013	since 17 March 2018

The fifth session of the 13th National People's Congress of the People's Republic of China (PRC) was held from 5 March to 11 March 2022, concurrently with the Chinese People's Political Consultative Conference (CPPCC) as part of the annual Two Sessions. The 13th National People's Congress was held at the Great Hall of the People in Beijing.

== Voting results ==
=== Resolutions ===
Topic		For	Against	Abstain	Rate
Premier Li Keqiang's Government Work Report		2,752	3	3	99.78%
Draft Outline of the 14th Five-Year Plan for National Economic and Social Development and the Long-Term Objectives for 2035		2,873	1	0	99.20%
Report on the Implementation of the 2021 National Economic and Social Development Plan and the 2022 Draft Plan		2,730	19	9	98.98%
Report on the Execution of the Central and Local Budgets for 2021 and on the Draft Central and Local Budgets for 2022		2,701	41	15	97.93%
National People's Congress Organic Law Amendment		2,749	4	5	99.67%
Decision on improving the electoral system of Hong Kong		2,895	0	1	99.97%
Drafts of electing delegates for the next term	All	2,750	3	4	99.71%
Drafts of electing delegates for the next term	Hong Kong	2,751	3	3	99.75%
Drafts of electing delegates for the next term	Macau	2,756	1	0	99.93%
Chairman Li Zhanshu's NPCSC Work Report		2,747	9	1	99.60%
Chief Justice Zhou Qiang's Supreme People's Court Work Report		2,652	76	29	96.16%
Procurator-General Zhang Jun's Supreme People's Procuratorate Work Report		2,687	47	23	97.43%
