= Third session of the 13th National People's Congress =

2020 National People's Congress; 第十三届全国人民代表大会第三次会议; _{3rd plenary session of the}; _{13th National People's Congress}; 22 May – 28 May
President	Premier	Congress Chairman
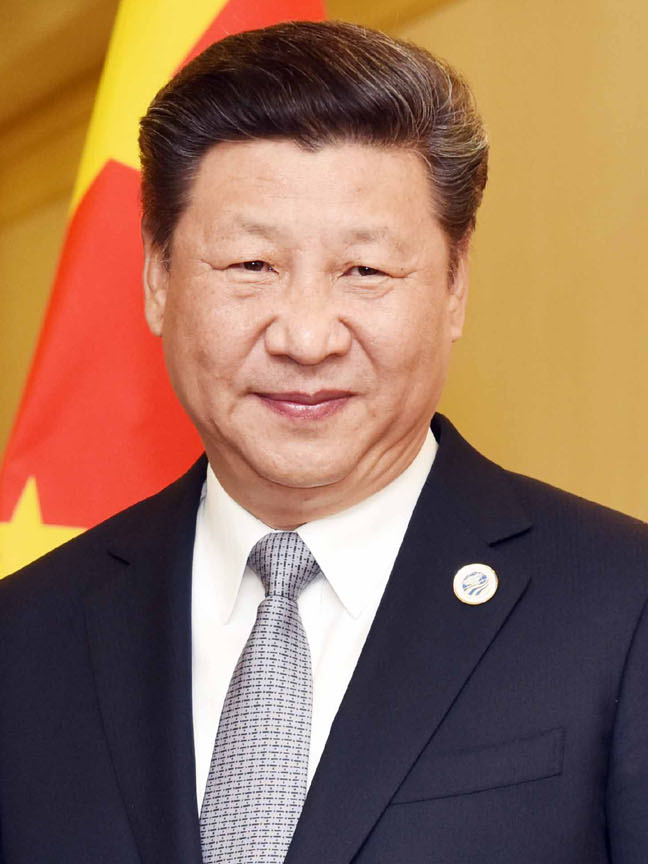
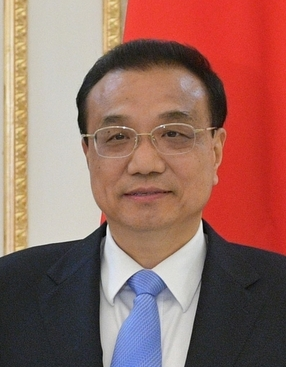
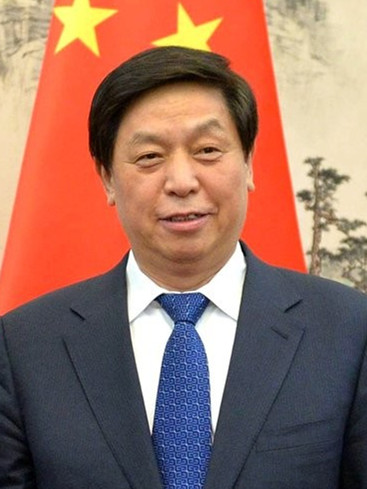
Xi Jinping	Li Keqiang	Li Zhanshu
since 14 March 2013	since 15 March 2013	since 17 March 2018

The third session of the 13th National People's Congress was held from Friday 22 to 28 May, concurrently with the Chinese People's Political Consultative Conference (CPPCC) as part of the annual Two Sessions. It was originally scheduled to be held in March 2020 at the Great Hall of the People in Beijing, China, however due to the global COVID-19 pandemic, it had been delayed until May.

== The session ==
Due to the ongoing health crisis, the session of the 13th National People's Congress was shorter than the usual weeklong affair. The thousands of deputies in attendance were all tested for the coronavirus and isolated ahead of the event, and most events involving reporters took place through online conferencing.

Premier Li Keqiang did not announce a growth target for the Chinese economy for the year when he delivered the Standing Committee's work report to the NPC delegates on Friday morning.

The NPC announced an increase of 6.6 per cent in its military spending.

The Congress voted on an anti-sedition law in response to the 2019–20 Hong Kong protests, thereby bypassing the Legislative Council of Hong Kong. The law banned sedition, secession and subversion of the government in Beijing. In response, United States Department of State spokeswoman Morgan Ortagus warned that "any effort to impose national security legislation that does not reflect the will of the people of Hong Kong" would be met with international condemnation. The US State Department' comments were countered by China, who decried any attempt by the US to interfere with internal Chinese affairs.

== Voting results ==
=== Resolutions ===
Topic	For	Against	Abstain	Rate
Premier Li Keqiang's Government Work Report	2,882	3	1	99.86%
Civil Code	2,879	2	5	99.76%
Decision on Hong Kong national security legislation	2,878	1	6	99.76%
Report on the Implementation of the 2019 National Economic and Social Development Plan and the 2020 Draft Plan	2,855	20	11	98.93%
Report on the Execution of the Central and Local Budgets for 2019 and on the Draft Central and Local Budgets for 2020	2,831	39	15	98.13%
Chairman Li Zhanshu's NPCSC Work Report	2,875	9	2	99.62%
Chief Justice Zhou Qiang's Supreme People's Court Work Report	2,794	76	16	96.81%
Procurator-General Zhang Jun's Supreme People's Procuratorate Work Report	2,811	5	22	97.43%
Resignation of Feng Zhonghua from the NPCSC	2,853	0	1	98.89%
