= Medal of the Republic =

Highest honorary medal of the People's Republic of China

Medal of the Republic 共和国勋章

Awarded by China
- Type: Order
- Established: 1 January 2016
- Country: China
- Eligibility: Citizens of China
- Awarded for: "Outstanding individuals who have made great contributions and established outstanding merits in the construction of socialism with Chinese characteristics and defense of the country."
- Status: Active
- Decided by: Standing Committee of the National People's Congress
- Presented by: President of China

Statistics
- First induction: 17 September 2019
- Total inductees: 13

Precedence
- Next (lower): July 1 Medal; August 1 Medal
- Equivalent: Friendship Medal

The Medal of the Republic is the highest honorary medal of the People's Republic of China. The bestowal is decided by the Standing Committee of the National People's Congress and presented by the President of China. According to law, this medal is bestowed on "outstanding individuals who have made great contributions and established outstanding merits in the construction of socialism with Chinese characteristics and defense of the country."

On 27 December 2015, the Standing Committee of the National People's Congress passed a law establishing three national orders of merit: the Medal of the Republic, the National Honorary Titles, and the Friendship Medal, effective on 1 January 2016.

== Description ==
The Medal of the Republic adopts an overall color scheme of red and gold. The badge features the National Emblem and the five-pointed star, as well as symbolic representations of the Yellow River, the Yangtze, mountain peaks, and peonies (specifically the mǔdān 牡丹, or Paeonia × suffruticosa). The chain incorporates motifs inspired by the Chinese knot (中国结), the ruyi (如意), and orchid. Various metalworking techniques, including cold-press forging, filigree inlay, and enamelling, are involved in the process of its production.

== Recipients ==
| Year | Name | Native name | Main identity | Notes |
|---|---|---|---|---|
| 2019 | Yu Min | 于敏 | Nuclear physicist | Medal bestowed posthumously |
| 2019 | Shen Jilan | 申纪兰 | Former congresswoman | |
| 2019 | Sun Jiadong | 孙家栋 | Aerospace engineer | |
| 2019 | Li Yannian | 李延年 | Army veteran | |
| 2019 | Zhang Fuqing | 张富清 | Army veteran | |
| 2019 | Yuan Longping | 袁隆平 | Agronomist | |
| 2019 | Huang Xuhua | 黄旭华 | Nuclear submarine designer | |
| 2019 | Tu Youyou | 屠呦呦 | Pharmaceutical chemist | |
| 2020 | Zhong Nanshan | 钟南山 | Public health scholar | |
| 2024 | Wang Yongzhi | 王永志 | Aerospace scientist | Medal bestowed posthumously |
| 2024 | Wang Zhenyi | 王振义 | Medical scientist | |
| 2024 | Li Zhensheng | 李振声 | Geneticist | |
| 2024 | Huang Zongde | 黄宗德 | Army veteran | |
