= Wang Shengjun =

Chinese politician

- 王胜俊
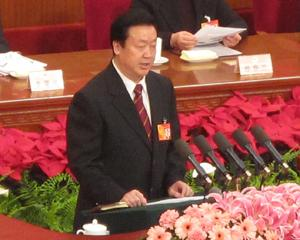
- Wang in 2010

Vice Chairman of the Standing Committee of the National People's Congress
- In office 14 March 2013 – 17 March 2018
- Chairman: Zhang Dejiang

President of the Supreme People's Court
- In office 16 March 2008 – 15 March 2013
- Deputy: Shen Deyong
- Preceded by: Xiao Yang
- Succeeded by: Zhou Qiang

Secretary-General of Central Political and Legal Affairs Commission
- In office March 1998 – April 2008
- Secretary: Luo Gan; Zhou Yongkang
- Preceded by: Shu Huaide
- Succeeded by: Zhou Benshun

Personal details
- Born: October 15, 1946 (age 79) Suzhou, Anhui
- Party: Chinese Communist Party (1972–present)

Wang Shengjun (simplified Chinese: 王胜俊; traditional Chinese: 王勝俊; pinyin: Wáng Shèngjùn; born October 15, 1946, in Suzhou, Anhui) is a retired Chinese politician who was the president of the Supreme People's Court of China from March 2008 to March 2013.

== Biography ==
He joined the Chinese Communist Party (CCP) in 1972.

Wang was appointed as the Secretary General of the Central Political and Legislative Committee in 1998. He was the member of the 16th, 17th and 18th CCP Central Committees. Wang has no formal legal training. During his presidency, he emphasized the "Three Supremes" doctrine articulated by CCP general secretary Hu Jintao.

He was a vice chairman of the Standing Committee of the National People's Congress between 2013 and 2018.

Legal offices
Preceded by Xiao Yang	President of the Supreme People's Court; 2008–2013	Succeeded by Zhou Qiang
