= Wu Bangguo =

Chinese politician (1941–2024)

- 吴邦国
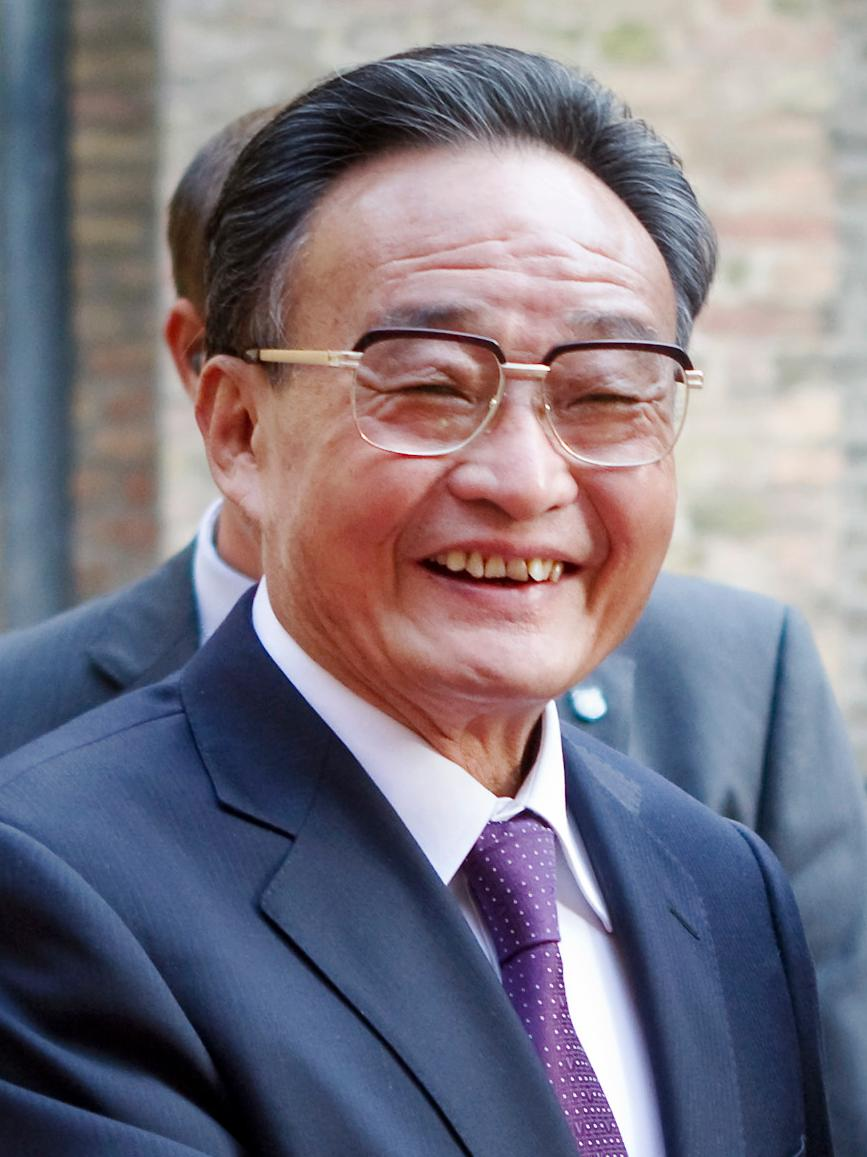
- Wu in 2012

8th Chairman of the Standing Committee of the National People's Congress
- In office 15 March 2003 – 14 March 2013
- Deputy: Wang Zhaoguo
- Preceded by: Li Peng
- Succeeded by: Zhang Dejiang

Vice Premier of China
- In office 18 March 1995 – 16 March 2003
- Premier: Li Peng; Zhu Rongji

Party Secretary of Shanghai
- In office 13 April 1991 – 28 September 1994
- Deputy: Huang Ju (Mayor)
- Preceded by: Zhu Rongji
- Succeeded by: Huang Ju

Personal details
- Born: 22 July 1941 Pingba, Guizhou, China
- Died: 8 October 2024 (aged 83) Beijing, China
- Party: Chinese Communist Party
- Spouse: Zhang Ruizhen
- Education: Tsinghua University
- Occupation: Politician, Electrical engineer

Chinese name
- Simplified Chinese: 吴邦国
- Traditional Chinese: 吳邦國
Transcriptions
Standard Mandarin
- Hanyu Pinyin: Wú Bāngguó

Wu Bangguo (22 July 1941 – 8 October 2024) was a Chinese politician who served as the second-ranking member of the Politburo Standing Committee of the Chinese Communist Party from 2002 to 2012, and as Chairman of the Standing Committee of the National People's Congress from 2003 to 2013.

Wu was an electrical engineer by profession, and rose to political prominence during his work in Shanghai. During the early 1980s, he was in charge of science and technology related work in Shanghai, where he worked with Jiang Zemin, then mayor and later Party secretary of the city, leading Wu to be affiliated with Jiang's political faction. He became Shanghai's party secretary in 1991, succeeding Zhu Rongji, leading him to assume a seat in the CCP Politburo in 1992. He became the country's Vice Premier of the State Council in 1995, with a portfolio including state-owned enterprises and the construction of the Three Gorges Dam.

He joined the Politburo Standing Committee in 2002, and was appointed the Chairman of the Standing Committee of the National People's Congress in 2003. Serving as one of the highest-ranking officials under Party general secretary Hu Jintao, Wu is generally regarded to have taken more conservative positions towards political reforms during his tenure. During his efforts, the NPCSC passed numerous administrative, social and economic laws to form a "socialist system of laws with Chinese characteristics". Notable laws passed during his tenure include the 2004 amendment to the Constitution, the Anti-Secession Law, the Oversight Law and the Property Law. He stepped down from the Politburo Standing Committee in 2012, and was succeeded by Zhang Dejiang as Chairman of the Standing Committee of the National People's Congress in 2013.

== Early life ==
Wu was born on 22 July 1941, in Pingba, Guizhou, with ancestral roots in Feidong, Anhui. His father Wu Zhongxing was a cartographer working on map projection. He entered Tsinghua University in 1960, majoring in electron tube engineering at the Department of Radio Electronics, where he graduated in 1967. He joined the Chinese Communist Party (CCP) in 1964. After graduation, he was employed as a worker and technician at Shanghai's No. 3 Electronic Tube Factory, and then deputy chief and chief of the technical section from 1976 to 1978. He would eventually go on to lead the factory as its party secretary. In 1978 he was assigned to become the deputy manager of Shanghai Electronic Elements Company, and between 1979 and 1981 the deputy manager of Shanghai Electron Tube Company. Between 1981 and 1983 he worked as the deputy secretary of Shanghai Meters, Instruments and Telecommunications Bureau.

== Political career ==
Wu's work in electronics companies earned him a tenure in the city's upper echelons of power. He became part of the Standing Committee of the Shanghai party committee in 1983, effectively becoming part of Shanghai's political inner circle, and was put in charge of work related to science and technology. During this time, he worked with Jiang Zemin, who was mayor and later the CCP secretary of the city. Between 1985 and 1991, Wu was elevated to CCP deputy secretary of Shanghai, and subsequently as CCP secretary of Shanghai, succeeding Jiang. During his tenure in Shanghai, he was seen as the official most responsible for developing the Pudong New Area.

As Shanghai's political and economic stature grew due to economic reforms, Wu gained a seat on the Politburo of the Chinese Communist Party, China's ruling council, in 1992. He was subsequently appointed the third-ranking vice premier in 1995 under premier Li Peng. During this period, he served in a portfolio dealing with industry and reforming state-owned enterprises, and also oversaw the Three Gorges Dam. He continued as vice premier under Zhu Rongji, and served as the role until 2003.

== Chairman of the Standing Committee of the National People's Congress ==
=== First term (2003–2008) ===
Following the 16th Party Congress in November 2002, Wu entered the highest power elite in the country, ranking second in the Politburo Standing Committee of the Chinese Communist Party, only under General Secretary Hu Jintao. In 2003, at the first session of the 10th National People's Congress, he was elected as the chairman of the Standing Committee of the National People's Congress, succeeding Li Peng. During his tenure, Wu was generally regarded as a member of the Shanghai clique and an associate of Jiang Zemin, generally taking a conservative approach towards reform. He was also described as having a low-key profile during his time in office.

Wu oversaw efforts in "forming a socialist system of laws with Chinese characteristics". Under his leadership, the NPCSC passed the Property Law (2007) and Tort Liability Law (2009), laying the groundwork for the Civil Code passed in 2020. Regarding administration, it passed the Administrative Licensing Law (2003) and the Administrative Compulsion Law (2011), as well as the Road Traffic Safety Law (2003), the Public Security Administration Punishments Law (2006) and the Food Safety Law (2009). Regarding social issues, it passed the Labor Contract Law (2007), Law on the Mediation and Arbitration of Labor Disputes (2007), and Social Insurance Law (2010), while regarding economics, it passed the Banking Supervision and Administration Law (2003), Enterprise Bankruptcy Law (2006), and Anti-Monopoly Law (2007).

In March 2003, after the Sun Zhigang incident, where migrant worker in Guangzhou died as a result of physical abuse he suffered while being detained under China's custody and repatriation (C&R) system, there were public debates about whether to abolish the C&R system. On 4 June 2003, when forwarding some unspecified materials to Premier Wen Jiabao, Wu included a note which said that "the "remedial" nature of [C&R] has shifted into "coercive management" of migrant populations (primarily migrant workers). The expanded scope of detention, coupled with interests-driven motives and heavy-handed enforcement, has led to violations of migrants' freedom and bodily integrity". He continued by saying that "while there are problems" with the C&R system, "the main problems lie in its enforcement", and recommended the State Council to "effectively correct the current issues in urban C&R efforts". At the end, the State Council abolished the C&R system outright.

On 27 March, Wu became the head of a special task force to draft the amendment to the Chinese constitution, which was adopted by the NPC on 12 March 2004. The amendment incorporated the Three Represents to the constitution and declared lawful private property of citizens to be "inviolable". In December 2003, General Secretary Hu Jintao instructed the NPC to create a "special legislation on Taiwan". At an internal meeting of the NPCSC's Party members Wu said that the legislature must expedite Taiwan legislation because "[t]he possibility of major 'Taiwan independence' incidents during [Taiwan's] 'constitutional reform' process cannot be ruled out." The Anti-Secession Law was ratified by the NPC on 14 March 2005.

On 6 April 2004, the NPCSC issued a legislative interpretation of two provisions in Annexes I and II to the Hong Kong Basic Law which handled the procedures for changing the selection processes for the Chief Executive and Legislative Council, respectively, which stated that no electoral reform may be initiated in Hong Kong unless the Chief Executive first submits a report to the NPCSC on the need for reform and until the NPCSC decides it may proceed. Wu explained the decision by saying that the "central leadership believes that it is imperative to make clear that the authority to decide on the development of Hong Kong's political system rests with the central leadership, and that the Legislative Council does not have the power to propose bills concerning the political system. To have the central leadership maintain firm control over the development of Hong Kong's political system, we must ensure that, even when the situation in Hong Kong is at its worst, the central leadership can still steer the direction of Hong Kong's political system".

On 25 February 2005, the NPC launched its own website. In July 2005 the NPCSC released the third draft of the Property Law) on its website for public comment, the for the first time in its history it published a law for public comment; previously, it had only published few draft laws in newspapers, requiring citizens to submit feedback by mail. For the remainder of the 10th NPC, the Standing Committee. released three other draft laws for public comment and, to better inform the public, posted their official explanations. In December 2006, Li told NPCSC's Party members that Li Peng left him with two legislative "challenges"; the Oversight Law and the Property Law. The Oversight Law was approved by the National People's Congress Standing Committee on 27 August 2006, four years after it was submitted for review and fifteen years after drafting first began. The Property Law was submitted in December 2002, and went through unprecedented eight rounds of review. After it was released for public comments in July 2005, it was accused of "departing from basic socialist principles" by granting equal protection to public and private property. After the seventh review, Wu spoke extensively in defense of the constitutionality of the bill at a meeting of NPCSC's Party members, including the provision affording equal protection to private property. The law approved by the NPC on 16 March 2007.

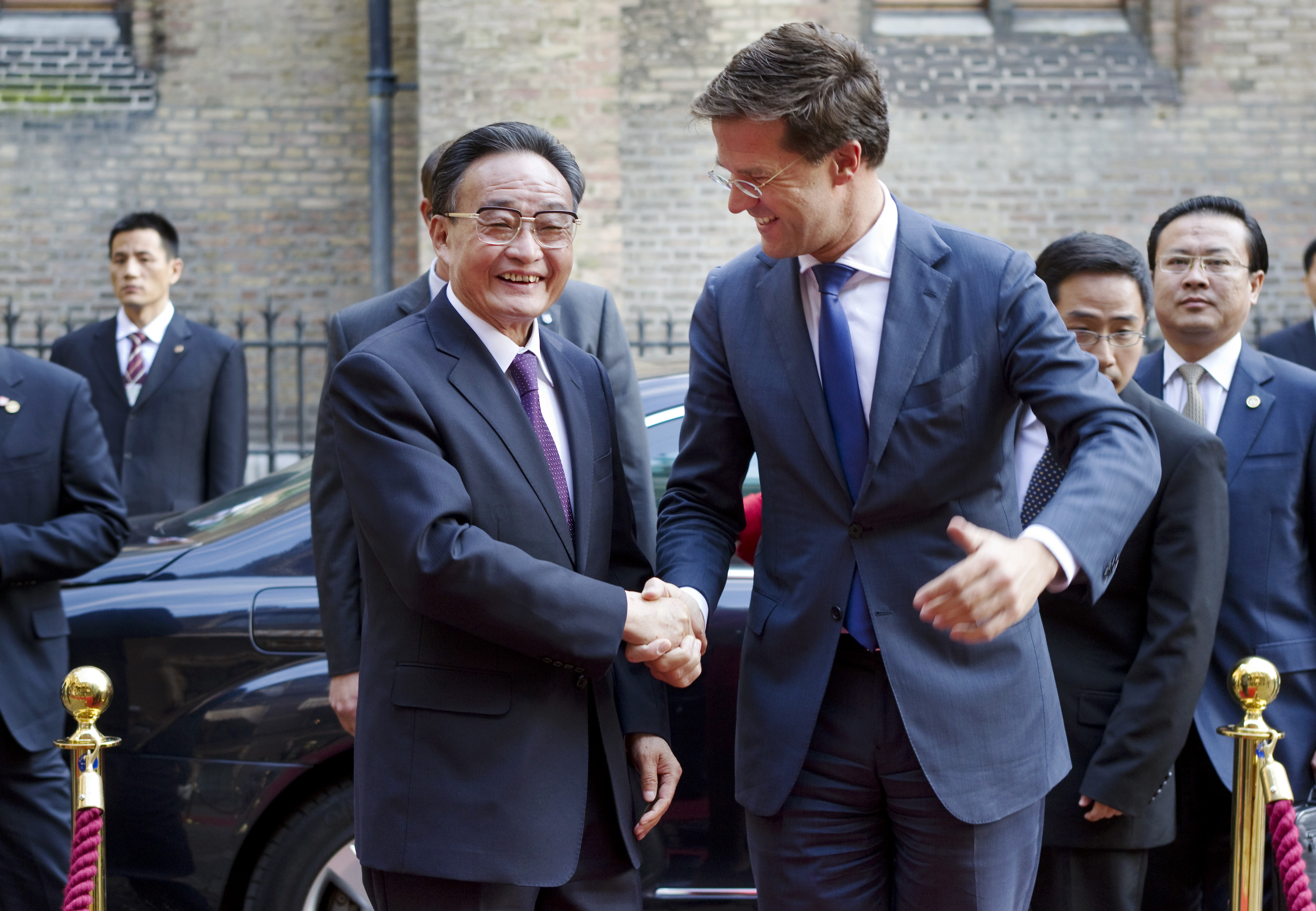
Wu meeting with Dutch Prime Minister Mark Rutte in Amsterdam, 2012

During a speech about the Hong Kong Basic Law in the territory in June 2007, Wu warned that Hong Kong will only have as much authority as granted from Beijing, and that the Special Administrative Region's government is an executive-led model and should not blindly follow Western systems. He also stated that the Central Government supported Hong Kong's development of democracy, so long as it is within the boundaries of the Hong Kong Basic Law. Although the remarks were left open to interpretation, they generated significant controversy in Hong Kong, with pro-democracy politicians calling it a challenge on the autonomy of the territory.

=== Second term (2008–2013) ===
At the first session of the 11th National People's Congress, he was re-elected as Chairman of the NPC Standing Committee on 15 March 2008, becoming the first person to serve as the NPCSC Chair for more than two terms since Zhu De. In April 2008, Wu and other legislative leaders decided, as a general rule, to seek public comment on the first draft of each major bill going forward through online methods. In his capacity as NPCSC chair, Wu delivered an annual address each year at the National People's Congress sessions in March. These speeches have always noted that China will not adopt multiparty democracy, separation of powers, or a federal system. In 2011, Wu proposed the "five don'ts (五不搞) by declaring that "[w]e have made a solemn declaration that we will not employ a system of multiple parties holding office in rotation, diversification of guiding ideology, separation of powers and bicameralism, federalism or privatization".

On 24 January 2011, Wu told a seminar that, with 236 laws and many more administrative and local legislation, China had accomplished its goal of forming a "socialist system of laws with Chinese characteristics" and that the NPC's priorities would now shift to "improving" the system. On 25 February 2011, the NPCSC approved an amendment to the criminal code, decreasing the number of capital crimes for the first time in PRC's history. It also criminalized drunk driving. On 16 July 2012, Wu attended the launch ceremony of Shenzhou 9 crewed spacecraft. Wu retired from the CCP Politburo Standing Committee at the 18th Party Congress in November 2012. On 28 December 2012, in one of Wu's final legislative acts, the NPCSC adopted the Decision on Strengthening Network Information Protection, which introduced important provisions for protecting citizens' "electronic personal information" and established a Internet real-name system. He was succeeded as NPCSC chairman by Zhang Dejiang in March 2013. In his last speech as the NPCSC chair, he said that "we will absolutely not copy models in the Western political system".

== Post-retirement ==
Similar to other retired top-ranking officials in China, Wu stopped making public appearances except to attend important events such as the National Day celebration. In March 2015, Wu was pictured visiting a rapeseed farm in Wuyuan, Jiangxi province.

Wu died at 4:36 am on 8 October 2024, at the age of 83. A farewell ceremony was held on 14 October; Xi Jinping, Li Qiang, Zhao Leji, Wang Huning, Cai Qi, Ding Xuexiang, Li Xi, Han Zheng and other leaders paid their final respects at the Babaoshan Revolutionary Cemetery, while Hu Jintao sent a wreath. His body was cremated on the same day. National flags were flown at half-mast at Chinese government buildings, diplomatic missions, and in Hong Kong and Macau.

Political offices
Preceded by Li Peng	Chairmen of the Standing Committee of the National People's Congress; 2003–2013	Succeeded by Zhang Dejiang
Party political offices
Preceded by Zhu Rongji	Party Secretary of Shanghai; 1991–1994	Succeeded by Huang Ju
Order of precedence
Preceded by Hu Jintao; General Secretary and President	2nd Rank of the Chinese Communist Party; 16, 17th Politburo Standing Committee	Succeeded by Wen Jiabao; Premier
