= Property law in China =

Property law in China governs ownership of, and other rights in land, buildings and other property in the People's Republic of China. Since the Chinese Communist Revolution in 1949, collectivities or the state have owned most of the land; unless the law provides otherwise. People and firms hold limited use-rights, while buildings and apartments can be owned individually. The Property Law of the People's Republic of China first codified property-rights in 2007.

== History ==
=== Imperial China ===
Use of property was divided into topsoil (tianpi) and subsoil (tiangu) rights. Landlords with subsoil rights had a permanent claim to the property if they paid taxes and received official seals from the government, but did not have rights to actively use the land. Instead, those with topsoil rights paid the subsoil landlord a fixed rent (or part of the proceeds of what was produced on the land) for not only the right to farm and live on the land, but the right to independently sell or lease the topsoil rights to another party. So as long as another party held topsoil rights, the party holding subsoil did not have right to actively use the land or evict the topsoil owner. Land, like other forms of property, was seen as being held collectively by the family and not individuals within the family. Another concept in imperial Chinese property rights was dianmai (典賣/典卖), more commonly known as huomai (活賣/活卖), or conditional sales of property that allowed the seller (i.e., his family) to buy back the land at the original price (without interest). The assumption was that land, having been held by a family for generations, should stay with the same family. From the Sui dynasty onwards, women could not hold property directly and, for land to stay in the same family, it had to pass between male heirs following the rule of primogeniture. The Imperial times were time and space dependent and were affected by wars, rebellions and natural disaster. During such times, there were frequent shifts in ownership as abandoned land was reclaimed after former owners had fled or died. During the Qing dynasty (1644–1911) some titling of land ownership did take place, albeit not systematically or at a national level, and historical titles have been handed down to the present. Newly accrued land along rivers, creeks and other waters – so-called riparian rights – was clearly designated as state property, and the Qing government repeatedly emphasized this in imperial edicts.

=== Nationalist China ===
During the rule of the Nationalist government (1912–1949), communal and customary rights gave land tenure to landlords, nobles, religious institutions, and village communities. Meanwhile, the state drafted property laws, which were based on German and Japanese civil law traditions. Under Nationalist rule, the private sector owned most forests. After they had gained power, the Chinese Communist Party (CCP) gradually worked towards the abolition of private ownership. Private forest holdings continued to exist until the collectivization of the countryside.

=== Communist China ===
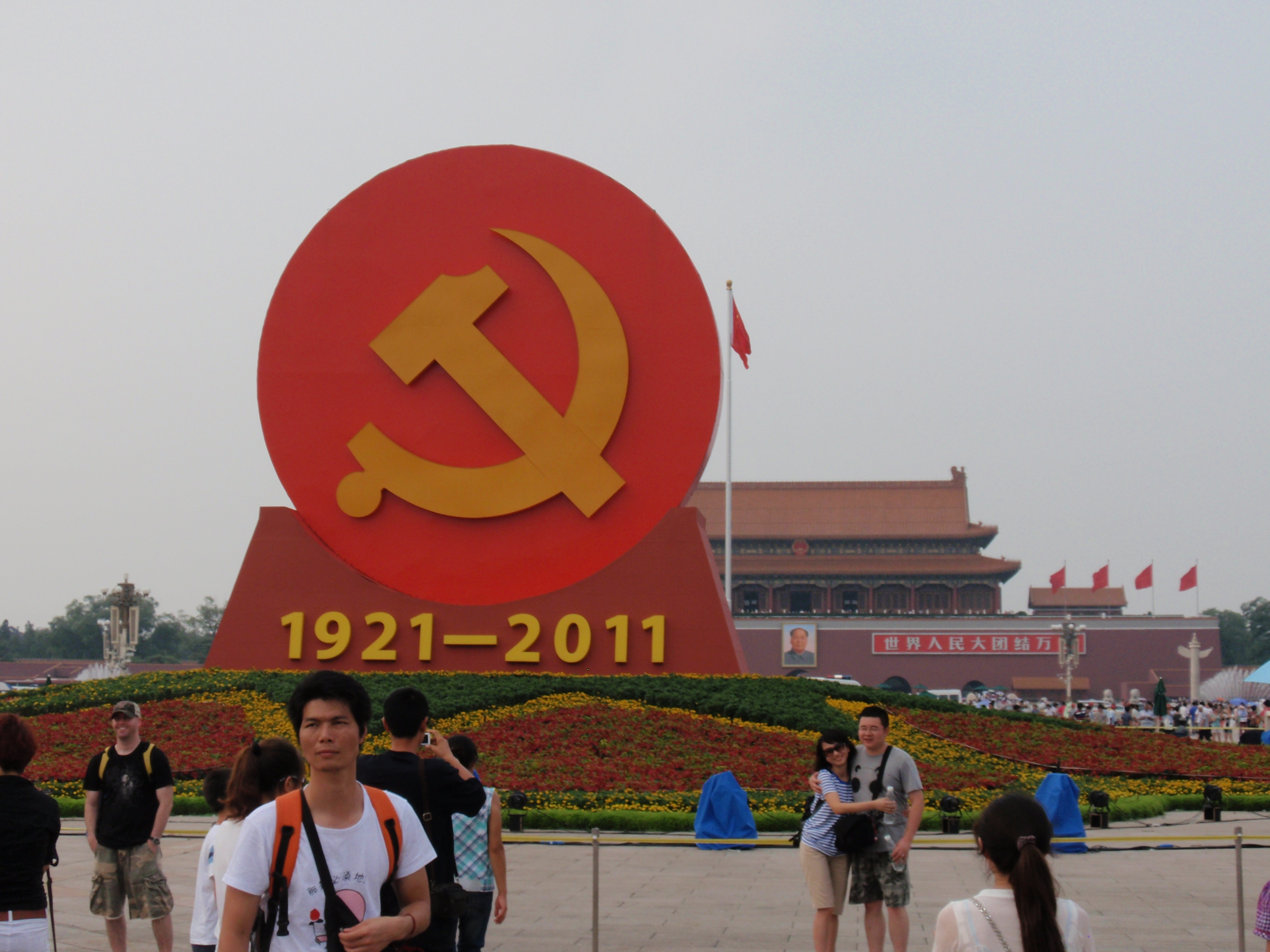
Communism and largely Socialist underpinnings influenced the development of China's Property Laws and Right relating to it.

In the areas controlled by CCP forces, traditional land tenure was broken up through Land Reform. In the 1930s Land Reform in the old revolutionary base areas, such as the Jiangxi Soviet and the Shaan-Gan-Ning Border Region, was carried out with the least possible social disruption. Middle and rich peasants were allowed to keep part of their land holdings, whereas expropriated landlords were allocated sufficient land to make a living. Yet, directly after the Second World War, Land Reform took a more radical turn. It was not until a speech by Mao in 1948 that a moderate stance was taken once more.

There were several times of changes in ownership and control over land in China. Regarding rural land, these changes began with the establishment of the Higher Agricultural Production Cooperatives in 1956. Thereafter rural private land ownership was effectively abolished through Land Reform, which left land in the hands of the state or the collective.

China's Land Reform (1950–1952) was one of the largest examples of land expropriation in world history. In the process, between 200 and 240 million acres of arable land were redistributed to approximately 75 million peasant families.

Until de-collectivization in the mid-1980s, there were only two factors making for change in land policies: the level of collective ownership and the extent of freedom in private land use. The Great Leap Forward (1958–1962) forced the central leadership to decentralize land ownership from the commune to the production team. This was laid down in CCP regulations promulgated in 1962 (the Sixty Articles) Freedom in the private use (not ownership) of land shifted various times. Before 1958, when rural China was organized into huge administrative units—the people's communes—farmers were allocated small plots of collective land for their own use (ziliudi). Depending on the region, farming was more or less privatized, with managerial responsibilities vested in the household. Farm households negotiated contracts under which they had to deliver grain quota to the state at low fixed prices. The surplus grain above the quota could be sold freely at private markets. These privileges were rescinded twice (and subsequently reinstalled) during the Great Leap Forward and the Cultural Revolution (1966–76).

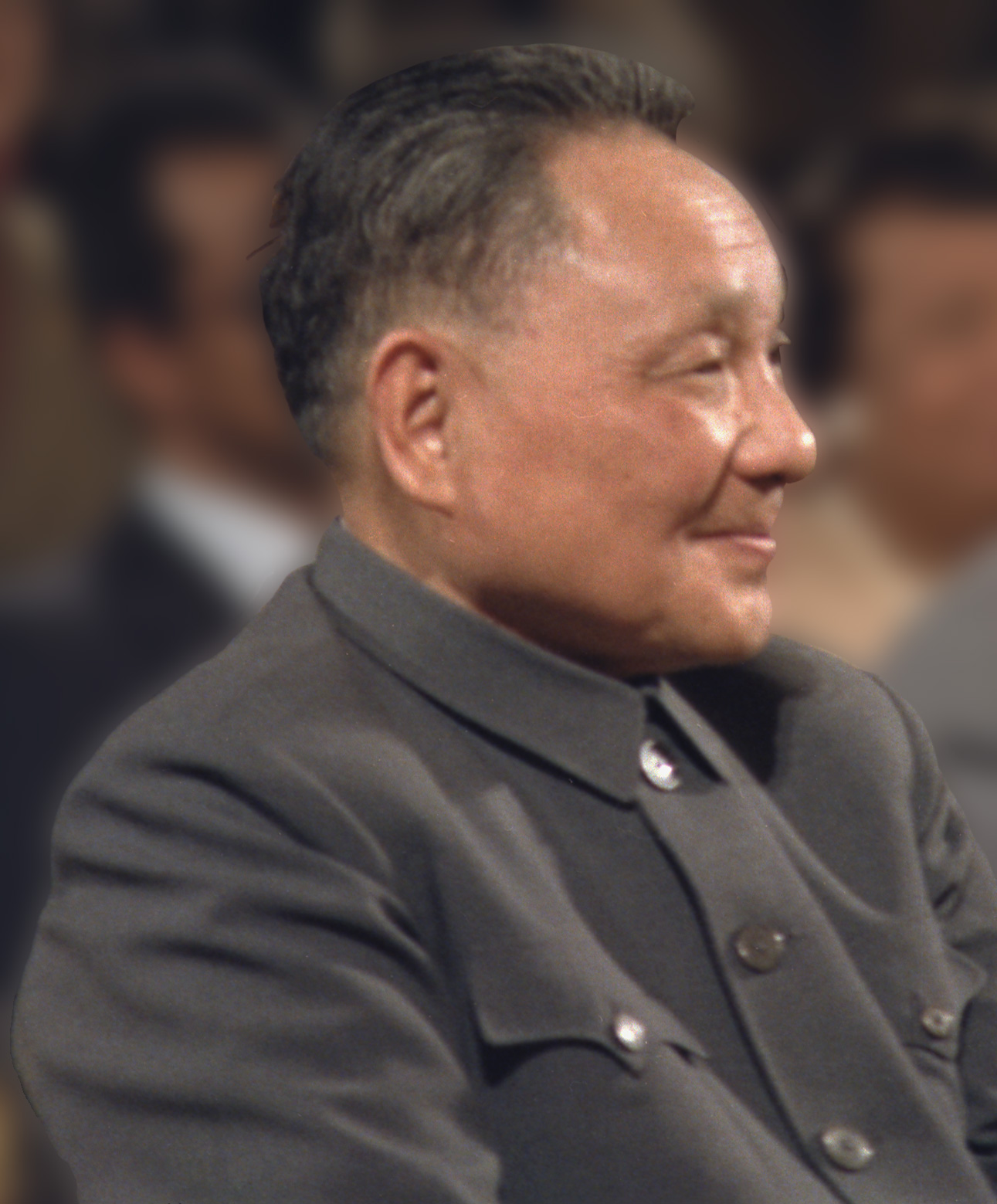
A picture of Deng Xiaoping, a Chinese politician, statesman, and diplomat.

In the case of urban land, after the nationalization of industries and companies in the early 1950s, it was deemed state-owned, although not legally stipulated for a long period of time. Land owned by the state was seen as "absolute" and therefore, did not warrant a title; a principle adhered to – and enshrined in regulation – until today. However, the notion that urban land is tantamount to state ownership and, therefore, excludes private ownership had been formally disputed by the State Land Administration up to the early 1980s.

=== Deng Xiaoping era ===
In the era of Deng Xiaoping, a fundamental legal source of the regime of property and property rights in the PRC lay in the Constitution of China enacted in 1982. The 1982 constitution provided for the "socialist public ownership" of the means of production, which takes two forms—state ownership and collective ownership.

=== Post-Deng ===
In 2004, China's constitution was amended to state that China "encourages, supports, and guides the development" of the private sector "in accordance with law, exercises supervision and control." The constitutional revisions stated that "citizens' lawful private property is inviolable," which was the first time in PRC history that private property rights received constitutional guarantees.

== Real property rights ==
An investor who wants to invest or develop land or property in China must bear in mind China's property laws, most notably the Property Law introduced in 2007, which for the first time protects the interest of private investors to the same extent as that of national interests.

=== Types ===
Real property rights in China can generally be grouped into three types: ownership rights, usufructuary rights, and security rights.

=== Ownership rights ===
Ownership rights are protected under Article 39 of The Property Law of the People's Republic of China, which gives the owner the right to possess, utilize, dispose of and obtain profits from the real property. However, this right has to comply with laws and social morality. It can harm neither public interests nor the legitimate rights and interests of others.

In general, rural collectives own agricultural land and the state owns urban land. However, Article 70 of The Property Law allows for ownership of exclusive parts within an apartment building, which endorses the individual ownership of apartments.

=== Usufructuary rights ===
The owner of a usufructuary right has the right to possess, utilize and obtain profits from the real properties owned by others. The obligee may not intervene in the exercise of rights by the owner of the usufructuary right. There are several types of usufructuary rights. These include the right to land contractual management, the right to use of construction land, the right to use of residential housing land and easement.

==== Right to land contractual management ====
The right to land contractual management allows a contractor of the right to possess, utilize and obtain profits from agricultural land. This right is transferable, but the land use rights based on agricultural household contracts cannot be changed arbitrarily for non-agricultural purposes.

==== Right to use of construction land ====
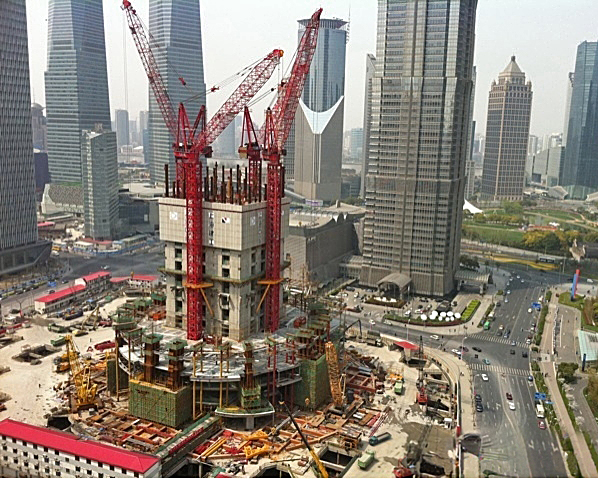
The state owns urban land, but the right to use of construction land allows developers to profit from land development.

The right to use of construction land is only with regard to State-owned land, and the owner of the right is able to build buildings and their accessory facilities. This is in addition to being able to possess, utilize and obtain profits from the land. This right may be established by means of assignment or transfer, but transfer is limited. The ownership of the buildings will change together with the land. As a protection of the right, the term of the right shall be automatically renewed upon expiration If it has to be taken back, compensation shall be given.

==== Right to use of residential housing land ====
The owner of the right to use of residential housing land can possess and utilize such land as collectively owned, and can build residential houses and their accessory facilities. The Law of Land Administration and other regulations will apply to the attainment, exercise and assignment of the right to the use of residential land.

==== Easement ====
The owner of easement has the right to use the real property of others to benefit his own real property. Easement will be governed by the terms of a contract.

=== Security rights ===
Forms of security rights include mortgages, pledges and liens. Holders of security rights have priority if a debtor defaults on his obligation. This is to ensure obligations are met. Security rights do not exist independently, but require a valid principal claim, and lapse when the debt lapses.

== Procedures in engaging in property investments ==
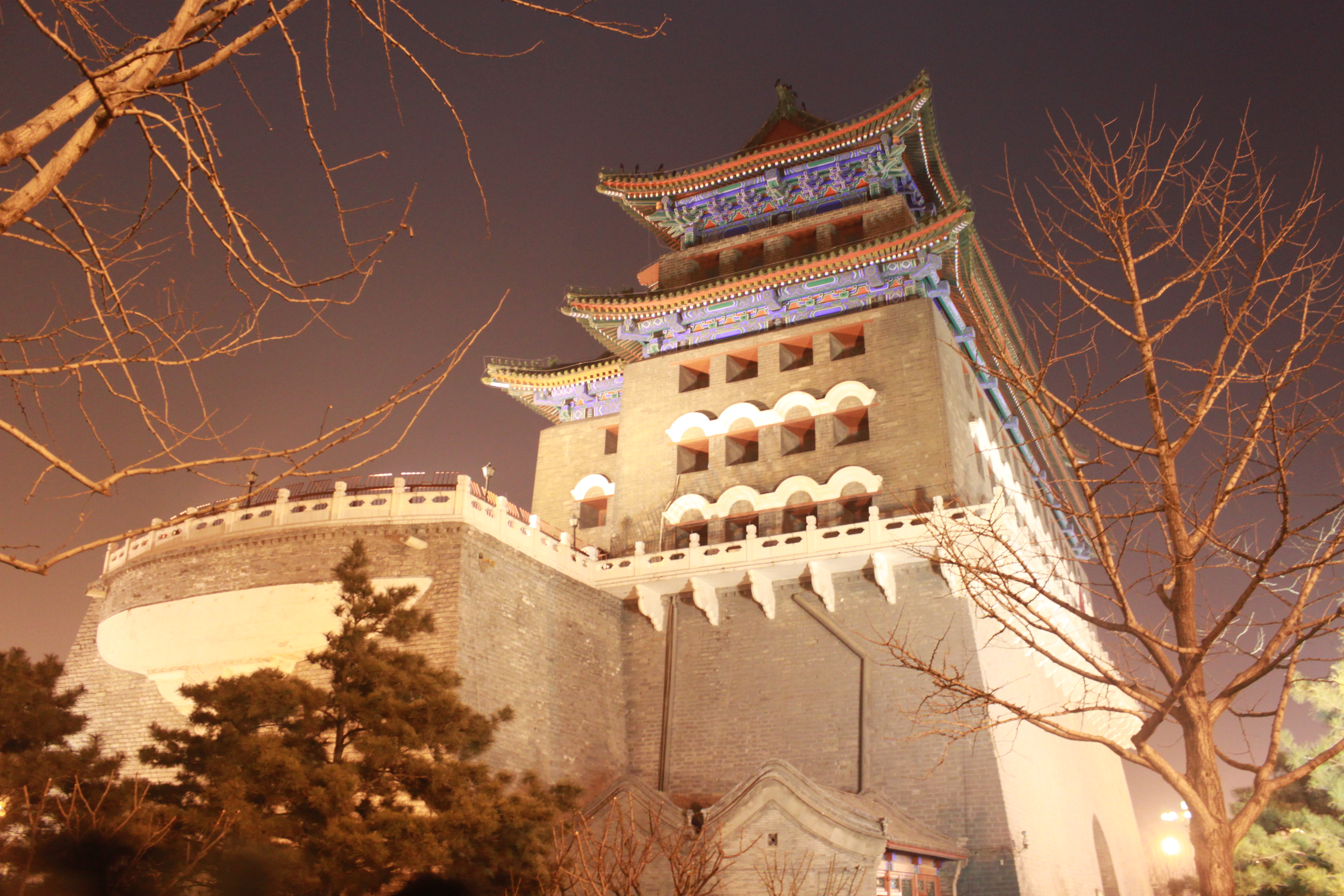
Property in Beijing

=== Buying land ===
Foreign investors are not allowed to buy land in China. The land in China belongs to the state and the collectives.

=== Obtaining land use rights ===
A land user obtains only the land use right, not the land or any resources in or below the land. A land grant contract shall be entered into between the land user and the land administration department of the people's government at municipal or county level.

The land grant contract must be signed. Land use rights can be obtained from the land administration department by agreement, tender or auction. Regardless of the method by which the land use rights is granted, a contract for grant of land use right, or more commonly known as a land grant contract, must be entered into by the land user and the local land administration authority or municipal governments at or above the county level as grantor.

Article 12 of the Provisional Regulations on Grant and Assignment of Urban State-owned Land Use Right states the different duration of rights provided for different purposes.

Purpose	Years of Grant
Land for residential purposes	70 years
Land for industrial purposes	50 years
Land for purposes of educational, scientific and technological, cultural, health care or sports	50 years
Land for commercial, tourism or recreational purposes	40 years
Land for combined usage or other purposes	50 years

==== Registration ====
In China, there is no unified official procedure for the rules on the registration of land-use rights and the ownership of property. All interests in land must be recorded in the official government register. This register is proof of ownership. However, different interests might be registered under different registries. The Property Law only offers a general guideline as to recordation. Peter Ho has described the recordation of Chinese property rights per institution as it exists until 2014. An overview is in the table below.

Authority and legal basis for titling per institution in China
Type of property right			MLR	MoA	SBF	MOHURD	MOCA	work-unit/collective
Ownership of land	ownership of collectively owned rural land		X^{I}					
Ownership of land	ownership of state-owned rural and urban land		need not be registered by law^{II}|					
Use right of land	Use right to collectively owned land	use rights of collectively owned agricultural land (lease rights, i.e. Household Contract System)		X^{III}				
Use right of land	Use right to collectively owned land	use rights of collectively owned grassland, forest and wasteland		?	?			
Use right of land	Use right to collectively owned land	use rights of collectively owned rural construction land (housing)	X^{III}					
Use right of land	Use right to state-owned land	use rights of urban land (exception: land used by national units/ministries separately titled)	X^{III}					
Use right of land	Use right to state-owned land	use rights of rural infrastructural land; expropriated for roads, railways, bridges, etc.	X^{I}					
Use right of land	Use right to state-owned land	use rights of state-owned grassland (includes use for mining, military purposes, etc.)	X^{A}	X^{A}				
Use right of land	Use right to state-owned land	use rights of state-owned forest (includes use for mining, military purposes, etc.)	X^{B}		X^{B}			
Use right of land	Use right to state-owned land	use rights of state-owned wasteland (includes mining, military purposes. Rights to riverbanks and riparian rights not legally determined)		?	?			
Ownership of real estate	ownership rights of rural real estate		X^{I}					
Ownership of real estate	ownership rights of urban real estate					XC		
Use rights of real estate	use rights of rural housing							?
Use rights of real estate	use rights of urban real estate		?					?
Other rights	Determination of provincial-level boundaries						X	
Other rights	Ownership and use of fisheries and beaches			X^{α}				
Other rights	Ownership and use of oceans/seas within national territories		X^{β}					

Symbols and notes
Note that the symbol "X" denotes a historically grown situation, not legally stipulated. Only the Forest Law mentions a specific institution for titling: the State Forestry Bureau (Article 3)
Key to abbreviations MLR = Ministry of Land and Resources, MoA = Ministry of Agriculture, SBF = State Bureau of Forestry, MOHURD = Ministry of Housing and Urban Rural Development, MOCA =Ministry of Civil Affairs, work-unit/collective
^{I}	1998 Land Administration Law, Article 11, 12 and 13
^{II}	Not listed in law
^{III}	2002 Rural Land Contracting Law, Article 23
^{A}	Grassland Law, Article 11
^{B}	Forest Law, Article 3
^{C}	Urban Real Estate Administration Law, Chapter 5
^{α}	Fishery Law, Article 11
β	Oceanic Use and Administration Law, Article 6 and 9 (formerly registered by State Oceanic Administration, since 2013 absorbed by Ministry of Land and Resources

Article 6 provides for a general registration requirement in the cases of creation, modification, transfer, and elimination of rights to immovables.

Article 10(2)(l) requires a unified registration system for all real property rights, but this unified system is currently only adopted in tier one cities like Beijing and Shanghai. The unification of interests in a single registry is still not prevalent in the smaller cities and will take more time before its implementation.

Furthermore, Article 10(1) allows for respective local rules of registration.

=== Function of notaries ===
China has a system of public notaries which are a subordinate agency of the Ministry of Justice of the People's Republic of China. They are responsible for certification of property titles.

== Government powers and procedures to expropriate real property ==
The description below applies to the post-reform and opening up legal arrangements and should not be confused with nationalisation of property before 1978.

=== Rural property expropriation procedure ===
The Chinese authorities are empowered under the Constitution and various statutes to expropriate land use rights contracted to individuals as well as ownership rights from collectives. Since all land is owned either collectively or by the state, expropriation of rural land only requires the withdrawal of land use rights for the reason of "public interest."

The definition of public interest is intentionally vague, and a general list of such interests has been expounded in an attempt to define what it means.

These include interests such as defence, transportation infrastructure, education and health.

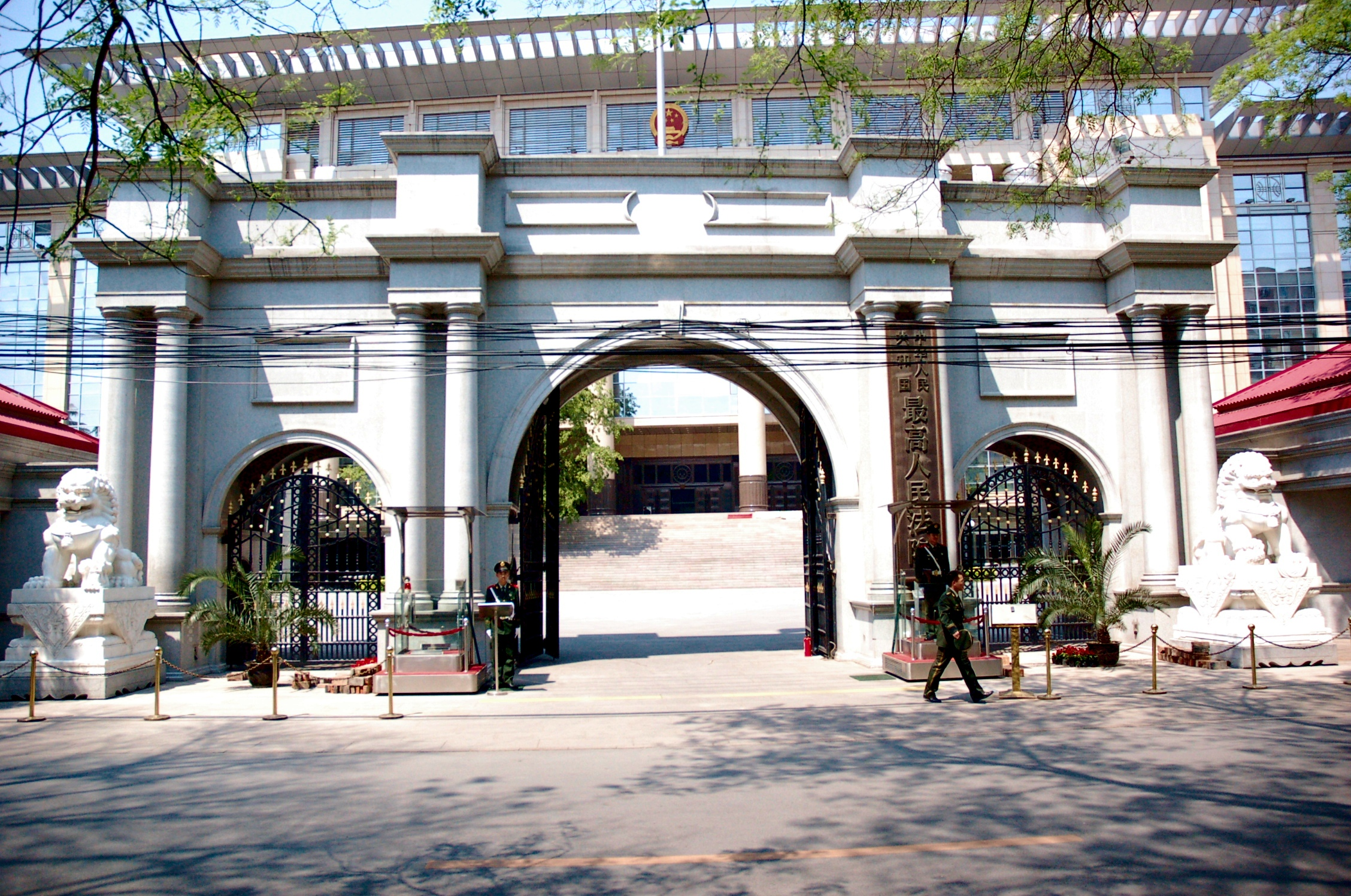
Recent amendments to the implementing regulations have allowed for greater access to justice

Currently, the types of compensation are:

1. Compensation for loss of land
2. Resettlement subsidy
3. Compensation for structures and standing crops

However, the first two are paid to the collective landowners instead of the farmers. Compensation for non-land rural assets is also highly discretionary.

Once the farmers and collective land owners are notified, the expropriation can commence. Disputes regarding the compensation and resettlement shall not affect the implementation of the expropriation.

=== Urban property expropriation procedure ===
The Land Administrative Law provides five situations under which land use rights may be withdrawn:

1. Public interests
2. Renovation of old towns
3. Expiration of land terms without renewal
4. Dissolution of holder of allocated land rights
5. Termination of use of public infrastructure

The rights holder is entitled to "appropriate compensation" in the first two situations. As the state owns the land, compensation is not made for the loss of the rights holder's land use rights, but for the private property which he had lost. It is made either in cash (based on market prices) and accounts for any moving expenses or resettlement subsidies, or in kind (in the form of a replacement structure).

Under the current legal framework, land developers no longer have the legal power to expropriate, and are no longer involved in the demolition and relocation procedures. The local government or non-profit organisations are now in charge of land expropriation and compensation.

By minimising the business interests in the expropriation procedure, incidents of forced expropriation might be reduced.

If a rights holder wants to protect his property, he can evoke certain procedural safeguards, which include:

- Application to urban condemnation administration for administrative review if agreement is not reached
- If review is unsatisfactory, a lawsuit may be filed within 3 months

In the event that an agreement cannot be reached between homeowners and the government, the expropriation can only be carried out after judicial review.

New regulations effective from January 21, 2011, have provided hope for the future with regards to several controversies surrounding urban property expropriation.

In January 2011, a 54-year-old man was beaten to death for refusing to leave his house that was expropriated for demolition. Following this instance, the employment of violence or coercion, or illegal methods like cutting off the water and power supply, to force homeowners to leave is officially disallowed.

Although these new regulations relate to urban land, the legal principles established have significant implications for the rule of law in China. The outlook for China's Land Administrative law is hopeful as future revisions regarding rural land are expected to occur in the near future.

== Controversies ==
=== Collectively owned properties in rural China ===
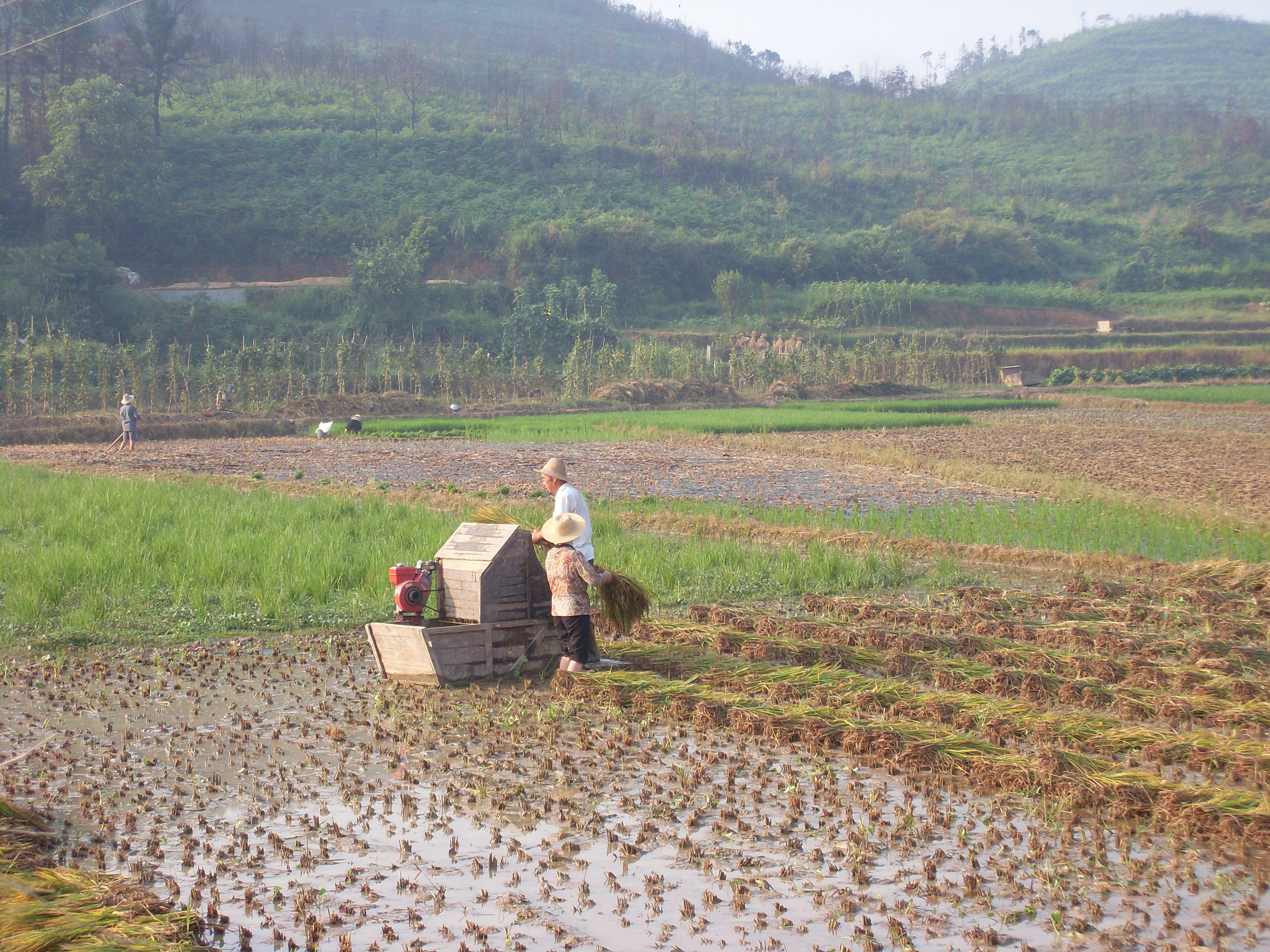
In China, most, if not all farms are collectively owned - a tradition and practice dating back since the rise of Maoism, a communist ideology.

While having implemented the household production responsibility system, China retains collectively-owned farmland in the rural areas. This creates a large potential for abuse as the critical decisions regarding the land and its use are made by a small number of village leaders. Peter Ho has demonstrated that one of the unresolved issues is the level of collective ownership. Since decollectivization, collective ownership – previously represented by the lowest collective level (former production team) – has been split up in three: the township, administrative village and natural village. Chinese law does not stipulate whether the former production team is still the legal owner.

Levels of Chinese administration and changes in ownership
Administrative level	Type of ownership	Period of ownership change	
		1949 – 1998	After 1998
Central state	state-ownership	National government	National government
Central state	state-ownership	Provincial government/Municipality under State Council	
Local state	state-ownership	Prefecture/City	
Local state	state-ownership	County/District	
Local state		1962* – 1984/85	After 1984/85
Collective	collective-ownership	Commune	Town/township
Collective	collective-ownership	Production brigade	Administrative village
Collective	collective-ownership	Production team = Original owner	Natural village /Villagers' group = New owner?

While the Property Law enacted in 2007 provides some legal leverage to prevent the abuse of power by village councils, it remains to be seen if legal remedies are accessible or are even used by the villagers. Prevailing local culture, the fear of authority and the possibility of violent repercussions hinder a victim's inclination to seek legal recourse. Also, such rules may be disregarded by the committees or councils due to lack of enforcement.

While critics may be skeptical of whether the new enactments clarifying the issue of collective ownership will make a difference, such changes are still welcomed as signs of increasing protection for the rural villagers.

Another issue is the problem of rampant corruption arising from rural land transactions, involving both governmental and non-governmental parties. This leads to over-pricing and also improper use of land that goes unchecked.

=== Socialist values vs acceptance of free-market economy ===
With the passing of the Property Law, a number of local legislators fear that "while the new property law would undoubtedly increase protection for home owners and prevent land seizures, it would also erode China's socialist principles."

In 2004, it amended its 1982 Constitution to include that the Government has to pay the person compensation for expropriation (征收) or requisition (征用). However, the article neither provides, either in the constitution or in any subsidiary legislation, for the quantum of the payment, nor does it stipulate that the payment must be proportional to the size of the land. This has led to abuse by government bodies, especially in rural areas. Expropriation of land from farmers is the most frequent cause of complaint among farmers. However, in 2011, the Chinese Government released regulations clarifying this, which promise to provide more transparency and a fairer compensation system.

== See also ==
- Property Law
  - Canadian property law
  - English property law
  - Australian property law
  - Scots property law
  - South African property law
  - Ancient Norwegian property laws
- Collective farming
