= Iron rice bowl =

Occupations with guaranteed income security

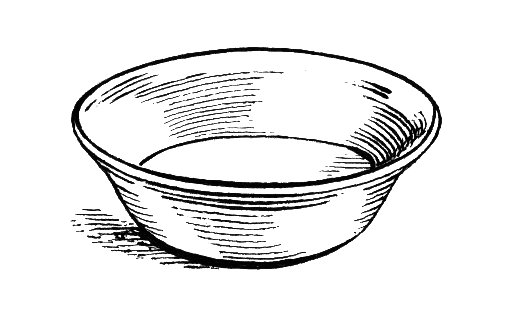
Drawing of a bowl

"Iron rice bowl" (simplified Chinese: 铁饭碗; traditional Chinese: 鐵飯碗; pinyin: tiě fàn wǎn) is a Chinese term for an occupation with guaranteed job security, similar to life tenure. Traditionally, people considered to have such positions include military personnel, members of the civil service, as well as employees of various state-owned enterprises (through the mechanism of the work unit).

== Origin ==
The origin of the term "iron rice bowl" comes from a story in Ji Yun's 1800 work Notes of the Thatched Abode of Close Observations (simplified Chinese: 阅微草堂笔记; traditional Chinese: 閱微草堂筆記; pinyin: Yuèwēi cǎotáng bǐjì). In the story, a beautiful maid works in a squire's home. One day, the maid breaks a bowl, but the squire does not punish her because of her beauty. After that, the maid breaks more and more bowls. In response, the squire decides to change all of his bowls to iron bowls, with the maid's beauty preventing her from ever being punished. The term began being used to refer to a stable or even lifelong occupation that provides a steady stream of income and welfare, and the two key terms of the "iron rice bowl" concept are job entry guarantee and exit control.

== History ==
=== 1949–1979 ===
After the People's Republic of China was established in 1949, private-owned enterprises were replaced by state-owned enterprises. Based on its needs, the government also established public institutions. According to Article 2 of the Interim Regulation on the Registration of Public Institutions:

The term "public institutions" as mentioned in the present Regulation refers to the public service organizations that are established by the state organs or other organizations by using the state-owned assets for the purpose of engaging in activities of education, science and technology, culture and hygiene.

As a result, the state became the main recruiter and employer. The state not only paid employees' salaries, but also provided social benefits, which ranged from gifts in Chinese festivals and holidays to welfare and retirement plans. Because these state-run enterprise and institutions guaranteed lifelong employment, employees were paid the same salary. There was a phrase to describe the situation: "No matter whether one works or not, one gets paid thirty-six a month". Because there was no merit pay, workers were less motivated. Therefore, most sectors experienced the issue of employment redundancy. The effect of employment redundancy includes employees' low efficiency and employers' high-cost.

Initiated from the establishment of the PRC, the iron rice bowl was one of the main slogans for communism: the Chinese Communist Party (CCP) was supposed to provide job opportunities for everyone. The CCP's promise to the Chinese people was crucial because almost half of the urban labor force was experiencing unemployment when the party took control. Due to the Japanese invasion and the Civil War directly afterwards, the Republic of China (ROC) suffered from hyperinflation from 1948 to 1949. Money became worthless and the basic life of the urban population became unsustainable. The adoption of the iron rice bowl provided security for people.

Even though employment was high during the Great Leap Forward period (1958–62), after its failure, many industrial development projects that were proposed were downsized or outright scrapped. As a result, the government needed to remove around 20 percent of the labor force. The size of the iron rice bowl therefore shrinked significantly.

=== 1979–2001 ===
When Deng Xiaoping began his labor reforms in the People's Republic of China in the 1980s to boost economic productivity, he began dismantling the iron rice bowl. In a move to transform China from a centrally-planned economy to a more free-market economy, he ceased guaranteed lifetime employment and state-provided welfare, leading to millions of workers being laid off and sparking large angry worker protests. His supporters justified that the iron rice bowl had to be dismantled if China was to modernize. During the 1978 Rural Revolution, Deng Xiaoping implicitly set an end to the iron rice bowl with the implementation of a number of economic reforms that were meant to embrace free markets. These reforms included the replacement of the collective farming system with a household responsibility system, under which households could contract land, machinery, and facilities from collective organizations in order to make independent operating decisions without losing the value of unified, collective management. This meant that farmers were able to personally benefit financially from their own crops, as households were able to get rid of surpluses in production as long as they were able to fulfill the collective quotas. The adoption of the contract system in rural China increased productivity and food supplies in those areas.

Deng Xiaoping also introduced reforms that made prices more flexible and allowed them to rise above the government-mandated price floors. In 1980, the government sought to end the system of lifelong employment for workers in state-owned enterprises by using fixed-term contracts to hire new labor, which they hoped would allow companies to refrain from renewing workers' contracts if they were not qualified, efficient, or capable enough. Under this new system, workers were examined and worked for six months on probationary terms, before a long-term contract for 3–5 years was negotiated. Children were also no longer able to fill their parent's position automatically if their parents no longer worked for that company. Further changes included an expansion of reasons for which an employee could be fired, as well as the ability of an employer to refuse a routine job transfer. Workers were additionally to refrain from arguing with an unsatisfied customer to the point of losing a sale, which was particularly relevant in customer-based industries, such as restaurant businesses and retail.

The Chinese Constitution was amended in 1992, when Deng Xiaoping garnered the political backing and CCP general secretary Jiang Zemin provided the initiative. The revised constitution scrapped the planned economy under public ownership in favor of a socialist market economy with Chinese characteristics that welcomed diversified forms of ownership, especially "privately-owned, individually-owned, and foreign-invested" enterprises. Still, public ownership at all levels of government remained dominant.

At the 15th CCP National Congress in September 1997, Jiang announced that reforms of medium-sized and large state enterprises would be accelerated. He proposed two new initiatives. First is major lay-off, or Xiagang (下岗) in Chinese context, in which workers were removed from their posts while still receiving minimal transitional wages. In practice, the policy resulted in tens of millions of SOE workers losing their guaranteed lifetime employment as part of the broader restructuring process. Second is divestiture of smaller state enterprises through mergers, leasing, selloffs, and, in some cases, bankruptcy. Since then, the government has indicated it is willing to go much further, announcing plans to sell more than 10,000 of China's 13,000 medium-sized and large state enterprises.

=== 2001–present ===
As a condition for joining the World Trade Organization in 2001, China had to "break the Iron Rice bowl", a step that was disputed by some economists. Breaking the iron rice bowl caused a major loss of state-supported savings. China's domestic savings decreased in the late 1990s and early 2000s, before rising sharply in 2008.

Efforts to break the iron rice bowl continued in Guangdong province in 2011 with a new plan of grassroots recruitment, employment by contract, and pay based on performance. The new arrangement was to be included in the 12th five-year plan of the People's Republic of China (2011–2015).

== Current situation ==
Since the start of post-Cultural Revolution reform in 1977, large numbers of workers in state-owned enterprises (SOEs) have been laid off while government workers retained job security. Up to this day, government officials (公务员; 公務員; gōngwùyuán) still have "iron rice bowl" lifelong job security, a circumstance often blamed for inefficiency and corruption. According to the Statistical Bulletin on the Development of Human Resources and Social Security in 2015 published by Ministry of Human Resources and Social of the People's Republic of China on 30 May 2016, as of the end of 2015, there were 7.167 million government officials in China.

== Problems ==
Some scholars claim that lifetime employment and seniority promotion systems are not the root of the problem. The key issue pertains to the contradiction between individual, collective, and state interests. The state-owned enterprises had to surrender all profits to the state, and income was paid in accordance with a nationwide wage scale, with little relationship to the financial situation of the enterprise. Employees and workers were not able to develop a strong economic identity with their enterprises since the economic performance of the enterprise had little effect on the individual's economic gains or losses. This was one of the reasons for the general lack of work incentive in Chinese enterprises under Mao and to a large extent remains the case today. Scholars argue that "The crux of the issue of workers' incentives lay with the state-oriented ethos rather than the practice of lifetime employment".

Given the fact that the positions of government officials were not threatened by China's previous efforts to shatter the iron rice bowl, and that workers at SOE's experienced disproportionate unemployment, scholars predict that there is possibility that the unbalance could lead to public dissatisfaction with the government. If the government fails to settle or compensate the newly unemployed, the CCP potentially faces the destruction of the social stability that has sustained its reform program, laying the groundwork for possible grassroots uprisings.

== Economic impact ==
Scholars claim that the iron rice bowl kept China from reaching its economic potential and reaching maximum productivity, as lifelong employment guarantee left managers and company owners with little to no incentive to respond to market signals. Similarly, workers who received a paycheck regardless of how much they produced, had no incentive to be more efficient and produce more output. However, this is not the only reason China fell behind economically. State enterprises lacked new technologies that were already being used in other countries, due to the high costs of providing required public services and upholding the wages promised by the state. This ultimately led to low levels of productivity, and little economic growth. Yet, the government, which relied on the iron rice bowl for social stability in order to maintain authoritarian control, was hesitant to smash the iron rice bowl in order to achieve economic growth.

During the time of the reform and opening up in 1978, with soft budget constraints and the requirement to implement the government's goal of full-employment, the SOE sector had substantial redundant labor and many state owned firms were operating at a loss. In 1995 and 1996, around 50% of the SOEs (mostly small or medium-sized) reported losses (Meng, 2003). The Asian financial crisis in 1997 exacerbated the situation. The Chinese government was forced to take actions to improve efficiency of the SOEs and to stem losses.

== Women ==
While 1950's New Marriage Law was the first legal document under the Communist Party which was supposed to guarantee women's rights, women were still largely unprotected. Nor did the establishment of the All-China Democratic Women's Federation (ACWF) help to improve women's status significantly. In order to achieve gender equality, women needed to join the labor force as men did. However, neither the CCP nor the ACWF tried to create jobs for most women because China's economy had not yet grown enough to be capable of including so many women in the labor force. As a result, even after 1949, most Chinese women in rural areas still did not join the workforce: most women's lives stayed the same. They remained at home as caretakers. Only educated women were given part-time jobs opportunities.

Although the Great Leap Forward was a failure, women's employment opportunities were improving during that period. Unrealistic quotas were set, both in industry and in agriculture. In order to achieve mass production, a larger labor force was necessary. Therefore, men were mobilized to work on mining, irrigation or the other industrial projects while agricultural work, which was traditionally taken care of by men, was left behind. In order to maintain agricultural work, women were mobilized to do the agricultural work. Because both men and women were working outside, the CCP founded dining halls to supply food for all workers and collective childcare. Women were liberated to a certain extent from their domestic work because the CCP needed their labor to accelerate production. Although women were finally able to go out to work, they sacrificed their health during that time period: they suffered from lack of nutrition and overwork.

== Taiwan and Hong Kong ==
The iron rice bowl's position as a main feature of the government within the PRC is relatively unique for the region. The iron rice bowl was not as prevalent in Taiwan as it was in mainland China. Taiwan has fewer state-owned enterprises (SOEs) and more foreign-owned companies, and therefore lacks the infrastructure for a state welfare system like the one China had maintained. In this respect, Taiwan has also not experienced the unrest from workers who have lost their job security and benefits, largely escaping the destabilizing effects of rapid modernization.

Hong Kong has historically been a center for foreign investment and home to fewer SOEs. The area's market reforms and status as a special economic zone meant that the presence of the iron rice bowl was mitigated, as Hong Kong has been more exposed to market pressures, especially those of the international market. Recently, government employment in Hong Kong has been seen as less desirable because of poor job environment and lowered job requirements. There has also been increased hostility towards the management of the welfare state in Hong Kong.

The popular conception of the security of government jobs contrasts with the perception in other parts of China, where young students still see the bureaucracy as a promising chance for employment and upward mobility.

== Other uses ==
In the Western world, the term has a similar usage. It has been popularized by Richard Lindzen in reference to government-funded scientists and labs that use their research results to justify continued government funding. Lindzen's thesis is that the intrinsic link between reporting and funding provides incentives to report research results in such a way as to ensure continued funding. The related term "rice bowl" often refers to a military project which is being protected in the interests of a particular department rather than wider needs.

The term is also used to some extent in Singapore, a former British colony where the majority of citizens are ethnically Chinese. It is also used in Korea (Korean: 철밥통; Hanja: 鐵飯桶; RR: Cheolbaptong) as a name for officials, not only because of their job stability, but also because of stable income. This phrase alludes to the jobs of civil servants being so stable that they would always be able to earn enough money to at least put food on the table. At the same time, civil servants must do their work to live just as rice is the staple of many Singaporean diets.

== See also ==
- Job guarantee

== Notes ==
1. This phrase was translated from a Chinese proverb: 做又三十六不做也三十六
