= Peanut production in China =

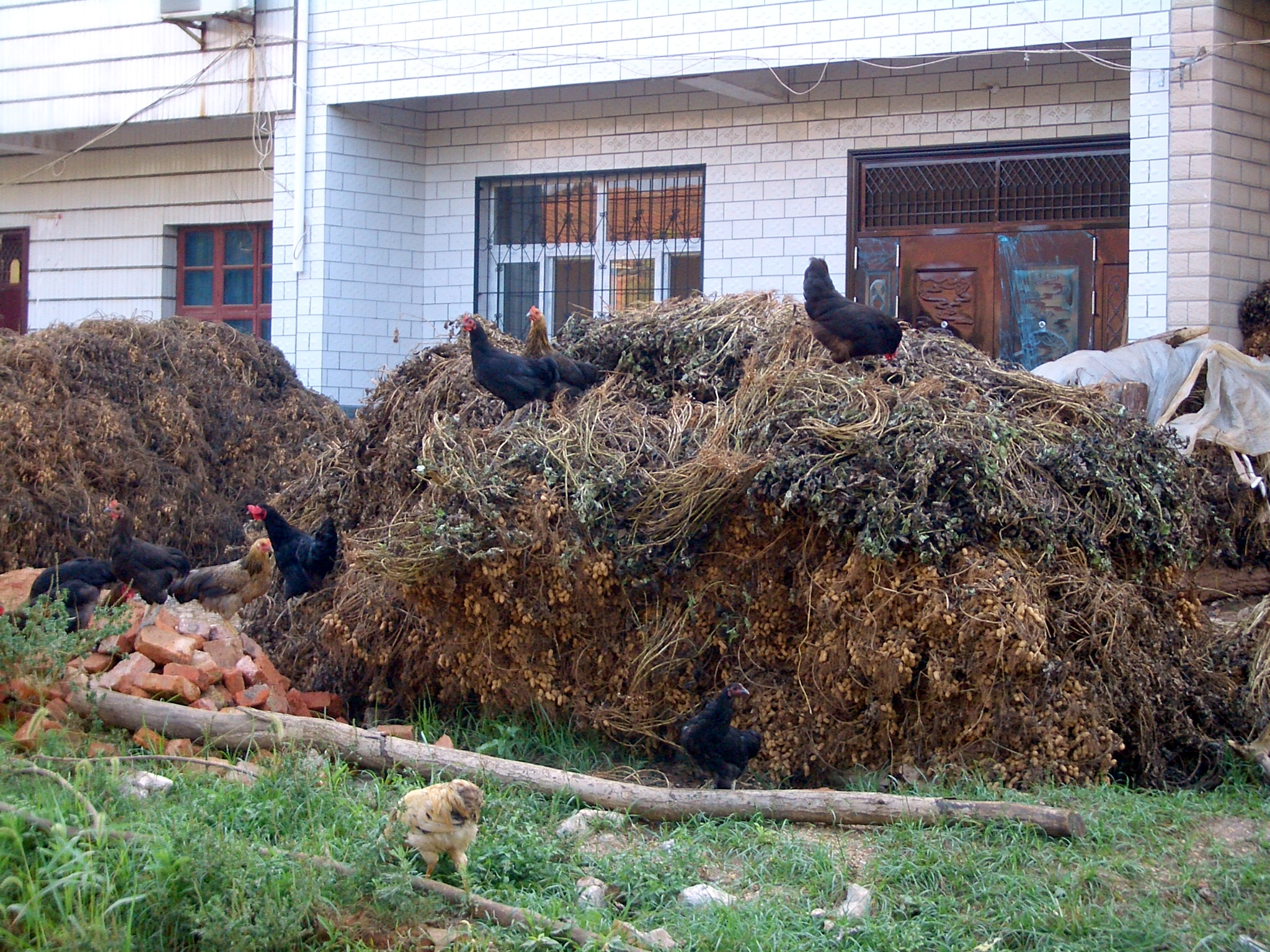
Harvested peanut plants stacked by a village house near Wuhan

Peanut production in China contributes to the national economy.

The peanut (groundnut) was introduced to China by Portuguese traders in the 17th century and another variety was provided by American missionaries in the 19th century. During the 1980s, peanut production began to increase, a major factor being the household-responsibility system, which moved financial control from the government to the farmers. By 2012, it was producing 16.7 million tonnes of peanuts annually. Peanuts are often used to make peanut oil, a popular ingredient in Chinese, South Asian and Southeast Asian cuisine. Although China is by far the world's largest producer, the per capita consumption of peanuts in China as of 2009 was stated to be comparable to that of the United States.

== History ==
Most experts attribute the introduction of the peanut to the Portuguese during the Ming Dynasty. Portuguese and Spanish traders introduced a number of crops to China during this period, including sweet potatoes, maize, potatoes, peppers, tomatoes, pumpkins, and tobacco. The peanut was introduced in Fujian at the start of the 16th century, and by the end of the century had spread to Zhenjiang. American missionaries introduced the Virginia peanut in the middle of the 19th century. Archaeological finds of purported ancient carbonized remains of peanuts during excavations in China have led to the controversial claim that the groundnut is an indigenous crop, or that explorers from China or elsewhere in the Old World had discovered the Americas and introduced crops from there millennia before Columbus.

== Local names ==
The peanut is known by many names in China, including Changshengguo (meaning "long-life fruit"), Luohuasheng (meaning "flower-born"), and Didou (meaning "earth bean"). It is most commonly referred to as "Huashengmi 花生米" or just "huasheng 花生".

== Production ==
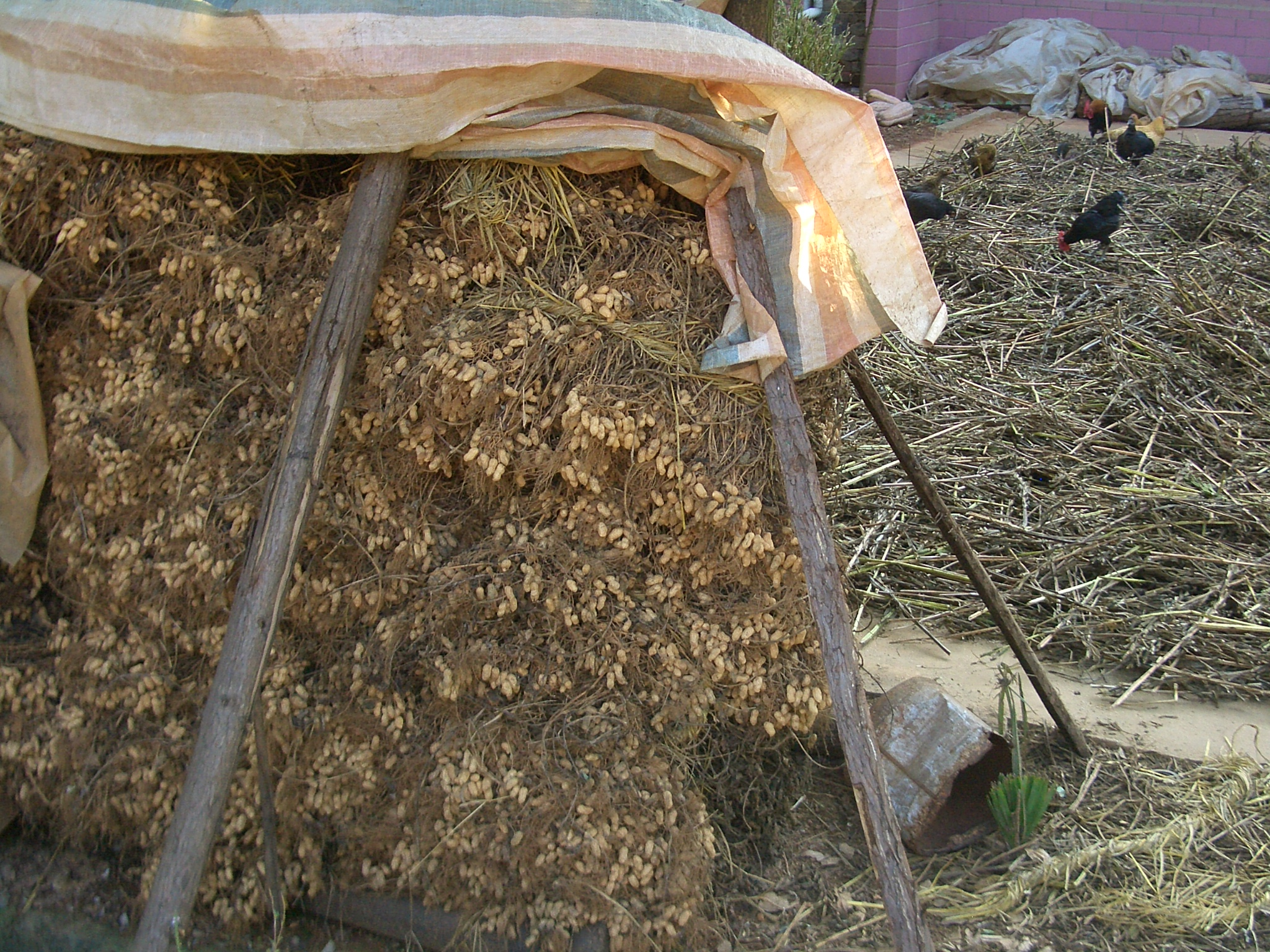
Peanuts harvested in Jiangxia

Peanuts are grown in seven regions of China based on ecological zoning, from the frigid North China to the humid region of South China, and from the eastern to western region. Temperatures in the areas producing peanuts range from −5 to 25 °C (23 to 77 °F). These regions are: Region I is "Virginia type north large peanut" region; Region II is known as "South Spring and autumn peanut area; in Region III the "Yangtze spring and summer peanut region"; Region IV is the "Yungui plateau peanut region"; Region V is the "Northeast early peanut region"; Region VI is the "Loess peanut region"; and Region VII is the "Northwest inland peanut region". The five provinces where 70% of the crop is grown are Shandong, Henan, Hebei, Guangdong, and Jiangsu provinces.

Peanut production in China has witnessed a phenomenal growth since 1961, particularly from the 1980s when the "Household Responsibility System" of cultivation became effective giving farmers the incentive of semi-private ownership rights, with the market economy giving a substantial advantage in increasing the yield per ha even though the area brought under the crop was not substantially changed; improved cultivation technology also helped in this increase.

Production in 2004 totaled more than 13 million metric tons. According to FAO statistics for 2013, the production of peanuts in China topped the list in the world with a yield of 17.02 million tons which amounted to a world share of 37.3%. This was contributed by 4.652 million ha ranking number 2 in the world but with highest yield rate of 3,659 kilograms per ha. Compared to this, India, with a larger area of 5.25 million ha ranking number 1 in the world, was way behind China production-wise, recording only 9.472 million tons at 31st position due to a low yield rate of 1,804 kilograms per ha.

== Varieties ==
There are over 100 cultivars in China, but the diversity between them is relatively low. More than 70% of the cultivars were affirmed to contain co-ancestors ‘Fuhuasheng’ and ‘Shitouqi’. Southern cultivars are quite related to each other, and mostly of the subspecies fastigiata. Most northern cultivars are quite related, and mostly of the subspecies hypogaea.

The variety group mostly exported by China is called ‘Hsuji’, which is a ‘Spanish’ type with a round shape. Spanish groundnuts are smaller and oilier than the other common groups, and are mostly used shelled, in confectionery, salted as snacks, or in peanut butter.

== Bibliography ==
- Malik, Chander Parkash; Wadhwani, Chitra; Kaur, Bhavneet (2009). Crop Breeding and Biotechnology. Pointer Publishers. ISBN 978-81-7132-590-0.
- United States Tariff Commission; Page, Thomas Walker (1920). Survey of the American Peanut Industry (Public domain ed.). U.S. Government Printing Office.
- Yao, Gang (2004). "Peanut production and Utilization in the People's Republic of China" (PDF). University of Georgia College of Agricultural and Environmental Sciences.
