= Meridian Gate Anti-Burma Rally =

The Mass Rally of Capital Red Guards Strongly Protesting the Anti-China Atrocities by the Burmese Reactionary Government at the Meridian Gate was a large-scale mass rally held on 3 July 1967, in the square in front of the Meridian Gate of the Forbidden City in Beijing, China, to protest against the Burmese government. The purpose was to protest the attack on the Chinese Embassy in Burma that broke out in June.

== Background ==
On 8 June 1950, the Union of Burma formally established diplomatic relations with the People's Republic of China, becoming the first non-socialist country to recognize the People's Republic of China. On 2 March 1962, Ne Win, Chief of the General Staff of the Tatmadaw, led a military coup, overthrowing the rule of Burmese Prime Minister U Nu, and then became the Chairman of the Revolutionary Council of the Union of Burma. The People's Republic of China became the fourth country to recognize the Ne Win government on 7 March, following the United Arab Emirates, India, and the United Kingdom. After that, the People's Republic of China was very indifferent to Burma in the ideological field, but actively sought to win it over in the international relations field.

On 30 April 1962, the Ne Win government published its governing program, the Burmese Way to Socialism, which proposed a path to establish Burmese-style socialism. Because the Central Committee of the Chinese Communist Party believed that this was not true socialism, China reacted coldly and did not make any public comments. However, the Soviet Union and Eastern European countries such as Romania, Czechoslovakia, Hungary, and Poland actively supported Burma's socialist path. Burma was dissatisfied with China for this. In April 1964, Liu Shaoqi, the Chairman of the People's Republic of China, visited Burma and talked with Ne Win, which dispelled some of Ne Win's doubts. However, China's attitude did not change afterward.

On the other hand, after Ne Win came to power, he adopted a large-scale economic nationalization policy. China took a positive attitude in supporting this. On 19 March 1964, the Burmese government promulgated a commercial nationalization policy, nationalizing more than 10,000 private shops nationwide, of which more than 6,700 shops were operated by overseas Chinese or Burmese Chinese. On 17 May 1964, the Burmese government announced that 50 and 100 kyat banknotes would be discontinued. In addition, during the nationalization of private schools and newspapers, overseas Chinese schools and newspapers in Burma were also nationalized or closed one after another. The Bank of Communications and the Bank of China were also confiscated by the Burmese government. In response, the government of China expressed its willingness to give the assets of the Bank of Communications and the Bank of China in Burma to the Burmese government without compensation; on the other hand, it actively appeased overseas Chinese and prevented them from transferring funds to China. This was in stark contrast to the Indian government 's protest against Burma and its actions to assist Indian expatriates in transferring assets. Although China gained the favor of the Ne Win government as a result, it also aroused strong dissatisfaction among overseas Chinese in Burma.

The report of the Chinese Embassy in Burma in 1964 and the report of the First Asian Department of the Ministry of Foreign Affairs of China in 1965 analyzed that the nature of the Ne Win government was the dictatorship of the bourgeois military group, and its political attitude belonged to the bourgeois centrist. It opposed the subversion of the United States imperialism, but dared not offend the United States imperialism. At the same time, it had illusions about the Soviet Union's modern revisionism and was somewhat close to it. It adopted a peaceful, friendly and neutral attitude towards China, but was also wary. These reports analyzed that if the Ne Win government fell, it was likely that a more right-wing government would come to power, and the United States and the United Kingdom would openly enter Burma, which would be very unfavorable to the situation of China and Southeast Asia. Therefore, maintaining the Ne Win government would be beneficial to the anti-American struggle in Southeast Asia for a certain period of time and would buy time for the Burmese revolution. For this reason, China helped the Ne Win government thwart the coup in 1964 and provided assistance to the Ne Win government to help it stabilize the domestic situation.

=== Arming the Communist Party of Burma ===
In 1967, during the Cultural Revolution, CCP Chairman Mao Zedong continued to emphasize the need to criticize the "Three Peaceful Acts and One Reduction" and the "Three surrenders and One Extermination" to promote world revolution and oppose imperialism and revisionism. On 7 July 1967, shortly after the conclusion of the anti-Burmese rally at the Meridian Gate, Mao Zedong delivered a speech when meeting with representatives attending the military training conference of the People's Liberation Army, in which he discussed his views on the world situation:

Currently, many places are anti-China, which may appear to isolate us; in reality, their anti-China sentiment stems from fear of China's influence and the impact of the Cultural Revolution. This anti-China sentiment is intended to suppress the people domestically and divert their discontent with their rule. This anti-China sentiment is a joint scheme orchestrated by the US, the Soviet Union, and revisionism. This does not mean we are isolated; rather, it signifies a significant increase in our global influence. The more they oppose China, the more they promote revolution among the people. The people of these countries realize that the Chinese path is the only path to liberation. China should not only be the political center of the revolution but also, militarily and technologically, become the center of the world revolution. We must provide them with weapons, even weapons with inscriptions (except in certain special regions). We must openly support them and make China the arsenal of the world revolution.

Mao believed that armed revolutions should be vigorously supported around the world, even at the cost of disrupting normal international relations between countries. On 18 May 1967, Zhao Yimin, deputy head of the CCP International Department, submitted a report to Zhou Enlai and forwarded it to Mao regarding the composition of the delegation of the CCP to the talks with the Communist Party of Burma. The report proposed a list of recommended members of the delegation, which included Jiang Qing. On 26 May 1967, Mao instructed: "It is better for Jiang Qing not to participate." In late May 1967, the CCP held talks with the Communist Party of Burma in China, and the CCP Central Committee determined to support the Communist Party of Burma (then chaired by Thakin Than Tun) in taking armed struggle.

=== Deterioration in relations ===
In 1966, the Cultural Revolution broke out in China. After that, some personnel of the Chinese Embassy and Consulates abroad, aid workers, students studying abroad and overseas Chinese distributed Chairman Mao's works, Chairman Mao's quotations, Chairman Mao badges and Cultural Revolution propaganda materials in the countries where they were located, which caused disputes in the countries where they were located. In June 1967, the personnel of China stationed in Burma disregarded the advice of the Burmese government and forcibly distributed Chairman Mao's quotations and Chairman Mao badges to overseas Chinese and Burma citizens, which aroused the dissatisfaction and intervention of the Burma government. Since the British colonial authorities had previously run an organization in Burma, which issued a badge to young people in Burma who joined the organization and required them to wear it to show their loyalty to the British Queen, Burma was very sensitive to the badge. The Burma government had previously enacted a law prohibiting students from wearing foreign badges.

Since June 1967, many overseas Chinese schools in Burma have asked students to remove the Mao badges they wear, but the students refused. On 22 June, the Yangon Chinese Girls' Middle School forcibly removed the Mao Zedong badges worn by overseas Chinese students, causing a dispute. On June 23, the Chargé d'Affaires ad interim of the Chinese Embassy in Burma (then Chinese Ambassador to Burma Geng Biao had been ordered to return to China) protested to the Ministry of Foreign Affairs of Burma regarding the incident on 22 June, in which the school authorities of the former Yangon Chinese Girls' Middle School forcibly removed the Mao badges worn by overseas Chinese students and openly insulted Chairman Mao, the great leader of the Chinese people. On the same day, the Burma government announced the closure of the Chinese Girls' Middle School and the Overseas Chinese Girls' Middle School. Subsequently, the Burma government closed nine overseas Chinese middle schools and overseas Chinese primary schools indefinitely. There have been many clashes between Chinese and Burma people in Burma, and dozens of overseas Chinese and students have died in the clashes.

On 27 to 28 June, in Yangon, the capital of Burma, Burmese citizens surrounded and stormed the Chinese Embassy in Burma. The Burma government dispatched troops to the scene to dissuade the Burma citizens, but some Burma citizens stormed into the embassy and killed Liu Yi, an economic expert from China who was assisting Burma. After the incident, the Burmese government repeatedly expressed its willingness to continue to maintain friendly relations with China. China government showed a tough attitude in diplomacy. On 28 June 1967, Han Nianlong, Vice Minister of Foreign Affairs of China, summoned Samar Duwah Sin Wah Naung, the Burmese Ambassador to China, to strongly protest against the Burmese government's instigation of thugs to attack the Chinese Embassy in Burma, kill Chinese experts, and persecute overseas Chinese. On 29 June, the People's Daily published on its front page the headline "The Burmese government instigated thugs to attack our embassy, kill our experts, and persecute our overseas Chinese. Our government lodges the most urgent and strongest protest with the Burmese government," and published the note issued by the Ministry of Foreign Affairs of China to the Burmese Embassy in China.

On 29 June, the Burmese government submitted a memorandum to the Chinese government, requesting that the Chinese government prevent Chinese citizens from holding demonstrations to protest against Burma's "anti-China atrocities." On June 30, 400,000 people from all walks of life in Beijing held a demonstration at the Burmese Embassy in China. On 1 July, the Ministry of Foreign Affairs of China handed over a memorandum from the Chinese government to the Burma Embassy in China, rejecting the Burma government's request in its memorandum dated 29 Jne for the Chinese government to prevent demonstrations and protests, and again demanding that the Burma government immediately lift the siege of the Chinese Embassy in Burma and the residential areas of overseas Chinese. As of 3 July. the number of Chinese people who went to the Burma Embassy in China to demonstrate and protest had exceeded 1 million.

According to Zhou Enlai's recollection of talking with Ne Win in 1971, he tried to resolve the dispute between the two countries through diplomatic means, prevent the incident of Chinese people storming the Burmese Embassy in China, and avoid personal injury to the staff inside the Burmese Embassy in China. During the large-scale demonstration by Chinese people to the Burmese Embassy in China that began on June 29, Zhou Enlai called the Ministry of Foreign Affairs and Fu Chongbi, the commander of the PLA Beijing Garrison, to ensure the safety of the Burmese Embassy in China, and demanded that "the masses are only allowed to demonstrate outside the embassy, and must not rush into the embassy, let alone harm the embassy staff." The Beijing Garrison troops ensured that the mass demonstrations held for several days did not result in any incident of storming or vandalizing the Burmese Embassy in China. In early July, some rebel leaders prepared to storm the Burmese Embassy in China, but Zhou Enlai stopped them in time.

=== Internal strife within the Chinese Ministry of Foreign Affairs ===
On the other hand, the Ministry of Foreign Affairs of China was embroiled in internal strife due to the Cultural Revolution. The Ministry had always been under the leadership of Zhou Enlai. On 18 January 1967, amidst the nationwide power grab across the country, the Revolutionary Rebel Liaison Station of the Ministry of Foreign Affairs, led by Zhang Dianqing, Wang Zhongqi, and others, announced its seizure of all power within the Ministry of Foreign Affairs during the Cultural Revolution and informed members of the Party Committee of the Ministry of Foreign Affairs. On the same day, members of the Party Committee of the Ministry of Foreign Affairs, including Vice Ministers Ji Pengfei, Luo Guibo, Qiao Guanhua, and Han Nianlong, all expressed their support for the power grab. Minister Chen Yi, entrusted by Premier Zhou Enlai, also affirmed the action. On 19 January, the Revolutionary Rebel Liaison Station of the Ministry of Foreign Affairs held a victory rally. From then on, the Revolutionary Rebel Liaison Station replaced the Party Committee of the Ministry of Foreign Affairs and controlled the Ministry of Foreign Affairs. Subsequently, Zhou repeatedly instructed the Revolutionary Rebel Liaison Station to limit its power grab to "leading the movement and supervising operations," striving to ensure that the Ministry of Foreign Affairs' operational authority was not affected by the power grab. In early February, the Revolutionary Rebel Liaison Station of the Ministry of Foreign Affairs attempted to seize power completely, but after internal discussion, it did not implement it. Thereafter, until March, the core group of the Revolutionary Rebel Liaison Station of the Ministry of Foreign Affairs obeyed the leadership of Chen Yi and also received Chen Yi's support. After March, Chen Yi lost power and Zhou directly led the Ministry of Foreign Affairs.

From the end of March to the beginning of April, Chen Yi was caught up in the February countercurrent and was criticized by the Revolutionary Rebel Liaison Station of the Ministry of Foreign Affairs at several large-scale meetings. On 20 April, Zhang Dianqing, the head of the core group of the Revolutionary Rebel Liaison Station of the Ministry of Foreign Affairs, was replaced by Wang Zhongqi because he disagreed with "overthrowing Chen Yi". In late May, Wang Zhongqi and others, the head of the core group of the Revolutionary Rebel Liaison Station of the Ministry of Foreign Affairs, posted big-character posters against Zhou Enlai, but the anti-Zhou Enlai activities of some rebels in the Ministry of Foreign Affairs were stopped in time by Mao Zedong through the Central Cultural Revolution Group. After that, the Revolutionary Rebel Liaison Station of the Ministry of Foreign Affairs was threatened by other rebel organizations in its power in the Ministry of Foreign Affairs. Zhou Enlai still controlled the diplomatic situation.

In early 1967, personnel from the embassies and consulates of China were ordered to return to China to participate in the Cultural Revolution. Ambassador Geng Biao, who was in charge of embassy affairs, arranged for the embassy personnel to return to China in batches. At the request of the rebels, Geng Biao's wife, Zhao Lanxiang, also became one of the first to return to China. As soon as she returned, she was criticized and struggled against by the rebels in the Ministry of Foreign Affairs of China, in an attempt to force her to expose her husband Geng Biao's "problems" back to back. Soon after, in early 1967, Geng Biao returned to China from Burma to participate in the Cultural Revolution. As soon as he returned, he was investigated and struggled against by the Ministry of Foreign Affairs of China. He was forced by the rebels to confess the "three surrenders and one elimination" of Liu Shaoqi and Chen Yi, but Geng Biao did not confess.

=== Mao Zedong's instructions ===
According to Wang Li, a member of the Central Cultural Revolution Group:

On 1 July, in a conversation with Zhang Chunqiao, Qi Benyu, and others from the Central Cultural Revolution Group, Mao Zedong said: "Regarding the Burma issue, we are not afraid of severing diplomatic ties, nor are we afraid of a complete break. In fact, severing ties at this time would be even better, as it would allow us to act more decisively." Mao Zedong added: "In our country today, it's not a big deal if the masses shout slogans like 'Down with this!' or 'Down with that!'" He cited examples such as the masses chanting slogans like "Down with Zhu De! ", "Down with Chen Yun!", and "Down with Chen Yi!" He also said that the masses chanting slogans like "Down with Ne Win! " was also not a big deal.

Mao Zedong's speech on 1 July was not promptly conveyed to the Revolutionary Rebel Liaison Station of the Ministry of Foreign Affairs. Later, on the evening of 7 August of the same year, when Wang Li met with Yao Dengshan of the Ministry of Foreign Affairs and representatives of the Revolutionary Rebel Liaison Station of the Ministry of Foreign Affairs and made a speech, the representatives of the liaison station said, "Many of the central government's directives have not reached us. For example, we were unaware of the Chairman's instructions on the Burma issue on 1 July."

== Anti-Burma Conference ==
=== Congress proceedings ===
On the afternoon of 3 July, a mass rally of 100,000 people was held at the Meridian Gate of the Forbidden City in Beijing to denounce the Burmese government. After the rally, a large number of people rushed to the Burmese Embassy in China and smashed some of the embassy's facilities.

According to the revelations of some rebel leaders, the Wumen Anti-Burmese Rally was planned by Qi Benyu, a member of the Central Cultural Revolution Group. Qi Benyu once met with Nie Yuanzi, Kuai Dafu, Han Aijing and others and said: "The Central Cultural Revolution Group believes it is necessary to hold a rally to protest against the Burmese government. The government's statement has limitations. The Premier is steady and cautious in his work, but he is a bit conservative. After the meeting, we should organize two marches, one to the Burmese Embassy and the other to the Ministry of Foreign Affairs, so that the leaders of the Ministry of Foreign Affairs can see the revolutionary spirit of the masses."

On April 29, 1974, Nie Yuanzi wrote a self-criticism in a letter to Jiang Qing. The fourth point of the self-criticism was: "I was deceived by Chen Boda and participated in the mass activities of the 'Anti-Burma Conference' and the 'Catch Liu on the Front Line' in July 1967." It stated: "I participated in the 'Anti-Burma Conference'. After the conference, according to the instructions of Jin ×× (chairman of the conference) or Qi Benyu, I took students to the Ministry of Foreign Affairs to make criticisms, demand that the Burmese government take a tough stance, and to relay the protests of the Red Guards and revolutionary masses, etc. This conference was originally a conspiracy by Chen Boda, Wang, Guan, and Qi to oppose the Premier and oppose Chairman Mao's proletarian revolutionary line. I was deceived and became their tool for opposing the Party."

=== Mao Zedong's attitude ===
On 7 July 1967, Mao Zedong and Lin Biao met with representatives attending the military training conference of the People's Liberation Army. Zhou Enlai, Chen Boda, Kang Sheng, Xu Xiangqian, Nie Rongzhen, Ye Jianying, Jiang Qing and other leaders also attended the meeting. Mao Zedong made a speech during the meeting, saying:

The situation is very good now. The Rajput people of India are opposing the Indian National Congress through armed struggle. The Communist Party of Indonesia has risen after purging revisionism. The Burmese guerrillas have also developed significantly, with a stronger foundation than the armed struggle in Thailand. They have been operating for decades, and while the parties were previously divided (with the Red Flag Party and the White Flag Party), they are now united and united against Ne Win. Their armed activities cover 60% of Burma. Burma's geographical conditions are even better than South Vietnam's, with a larger area of maneuver. Thailand's geographical conditions are also very good. With Burma and Thailand rising, the United States will be completely bogged down in Southeast Asia. Of course, we must also focus on fighting on our own territory as soon as possible, and on a large scale. It would be better if the Burmese government opposed us; hopefully, they would sever diplomatic relations with us so that we can more openly support the Communist Party of Burma.

=== Guan Feng and Qi Benyu's accusations against the Ministry of Foreign Affairs ===
Around August 10, 1967, Yao Dengshan conveyed the speeches of Guan Feng and Qi Benyu to the Ministry of Foreign Affairs. In their speech to Yao Dengshan, Guan Feng and Qi Benyu criticized the Ministry of Foreign Affairs on the Burma issue. For example, when drafting the People's Daily editorial to protest the Burma government, the People's Daily and the Ministry of Foreign Affairs each drafted a version. They believed that the draft drafted by the Ministry of Foreign Affairs was "not clear in its stance and not strong in its fighting power," and ultimately adopted the draft draft of the People's Daily. The People's Daily mentioned the slogan "Down with Ne Win's reactionary government" in its news reports, and as a result, the Ministry of Foreign Affairs questioned the People's Daily about this. The content of the conversation conveyed by Yao Dengshan also included:

Guan Feng said: "For more than a decade, the Ministry of Foreign Affairs has been deeply poisoned by Liu Shaoqi's capitulationist line. The leadership of the Ministry of Foreign Affairs is not guided by Chairman Mao's tit-for-tat and courageous struggle ideology, but by fear. What are they afraid of? They are afraid of affecting the friendly relations between the two countries. Regarding the Burma issue, if it were before July 1st, there would be nothing to say. After July 1st, Chairman Mao gave some instructions on the Burma issue. He said that we are not afraid of severing diplomatic relations or breaking ties with Burma. In fact, it would be better if we severed diplomatic relations at this time, as this would be more conducive to us acting decisively."

Comrade Qi Benyu said that the leaders of the Ministry of Foreign Affairs are full of concerns and fears, even when they are being criticized, they still talk about the friendly relations between the two countries. Comrade Qi Benyu said: It seems that the future of the diplomatic front rests on these young comrades.

Yao Dengshan told a story about a slogan list. When the Burma unrest first broke out, people took to the streets in protest. He saw that comrades from the First Asia Bureau had drafted a slogan list, which included "Down with Ne Win's reactionary government." This was sent to the Party Committee of the Ministry, where the word "reactionary" was removed. Han Nianlong explained that the sentence was too long, so it was removed. Qi Benyu was furious when he heard this, saying: "This isn't a matter of how long the sentence is; it's a matter of whether we dare to overthrow Ne Win's reactionary government."

=== Meeting of Zhou Enlai and Ne Win ===
On 7 August 1971, Zhou Enlai met with Ne Win, Chairman of the Revolutionary Council of the Union of Burma and Prime Minister of the government, who was visiting China. During the meeting, Zhou Enlai and Ne Win reviewed the twists and turns in Sino-Burmese relations in 1967, and Zhou Enlai also mentioned the Noon Gate Anti-Burmese Conference.
