= Three Freedoms and One Guarantee =

Chinese government policy

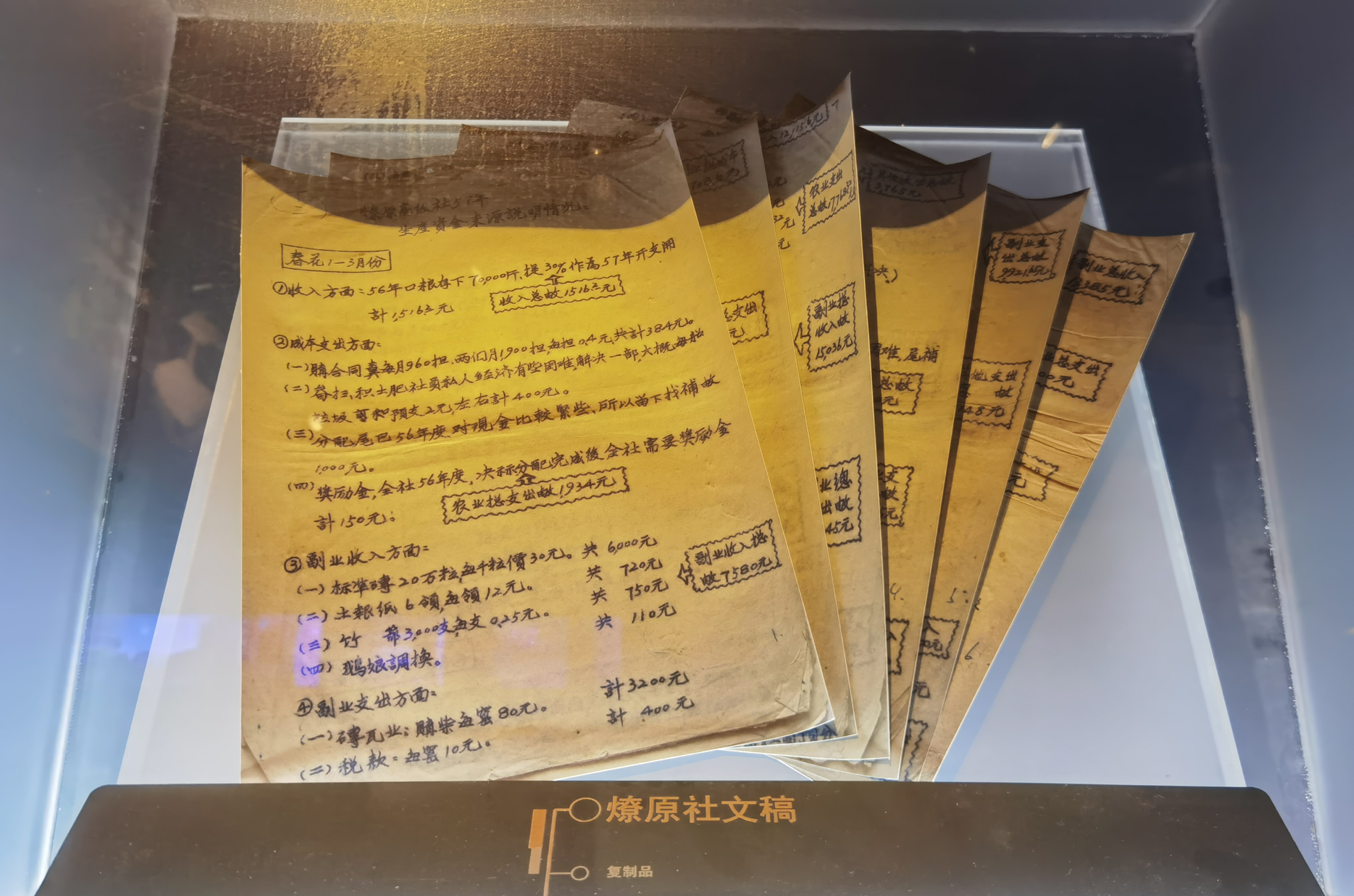
A copy of the archives of the "household contract responsibility system" in Liaoyuan Cooperative, Yongjia County, Wenzhou City, Zhejiang Province in 1956

The Three Freedoms and One Guarantee (Chinese: 三自一包; pinyin: Sānzì yībāo) was a rural economic policy in China during the period of national economic adjustment from 1960 to 1962. The Three Freedoms and One Guarantee originated in the mid-to-late 1950s. The Three Freedoms refers to private plots, free markets, and self-responsibility for profits and losses, while the One Guarantee refers to contracting production to households. The purpose of this policy was to alleviate the nationwide famine caused by the Great Leap Forward, restore agricultural production, and improve the living conditions of farmers. The Three Freedoms and One Guarantee received support from the central leadership, including Liu Shaoqi, Deng Xiaoping, Chen Yun, and Deng Zihui, but was opposed by Mao Zedong and others. After the reform and opening up, the Three Freedoms and One Guarantee became an important reference for the reform of the household responsibility system.

== History ==
=== Origin and development ===
The concept of Three Freedoms and One Guarantee first emerged in the mid-to-late 1950s. In 1956, the "household responsibility system" appeared in some rural areas of Guangdong, Sichuan, Hubei and Zhejiang. Subsequently, between 1959 and 1961, the Great Leap Forward led to the Great Chinese Famine, with tens of millions of people dying. In response, Anhui, Guangxi and other places carried out reform experiments such as the household responsibility system and "responsibility fields", which successfully mobilized the farmers' enthusiasm for production and achieved remarkable results.

In 1961, Zeng Xisheng, the first secretary of the Anhui Provincial Party Committee, and others decided to implement the responsibility field system in the province. This was supported by Mao Zedong, the chairman of the Chinese Communist Party. A survey of 36 counties in Anhui that year showed that the average yield increased by 38.9% compared with the previous year. In December 1961, Zeng Xisheng went to Wuxi, Jiangsu to report to Mao. Mao asked Zeng: "Now that the production team is the basic accounting unit, do we still need to implement the responsibility field system?" and "Now that production has begun to recover, should we change this method?" Zeng replied to Mao: "The masses have just tasted the sweetness, should we let the masses continue for a while?" At the Seven Thousand Cadres Conference in early 1962, Zeng Xisheng was criticized by Mao Zedong for engaging in capitalism and revisionism. He was dismissed from his post and transferred from Anhui Province.

=== Promotion and conclusion ===
However, the Three Freedoms and One Guarantee policy received a certain degree of support from the central leadership, including Liu Shaoqi, Chairman of the People's Republic of China, Deng Xiaoping, General Secretary of the Secretariat of the Central Committee, and Chen Yun, Vice Premier of the State Council. In the experiment of contracting production to households, Deng Zihui, then Vice Premier of the State Council, also played an important role. In May 1962, Deng Zihui, who was in charge of agriculture, reported to Liu Shaoqi that the implementation of contracting production to households in Anhui Province had achieved good results and suggested that it be continued in Anhui and promoted to other provinces. Liu Shaoqi expressed his support. Liu Shaoqi once said that a document should be drafted and promoted nationwide. In mid-1962, Deng Xiaoping expressed his support for the "household contract responsibility system" of the Three Freedoms and One Guarantee and quoted the proverb "It doesn't matter if it's a yellow cat or a black cat, as long as it catches mice, it's a good cat." The "cat theory" was put forward. Chen Yun not only suggested to Liu Shaoqi that the household contract responsibility system be implemented, but also advocated that farmers divide the land and work independently. He believed that "Deng Zihui's household contract responsibility system was not thorough and that the land should be divided among households". In early July 1962, he also met with Mao to suggest promoting it. Liu Shaoqi said that any means that are conducive to improving farmers' enthusiasm for production can be adopted. About 20% of the production teams in mainland China have successively implemented the household contract responsibility system.

On the other hand, in the summer of 1962, at the swimming pool in Zhongnanhai, Beijing, Mao and Liu Shaoqi had their first direct conflict. Mao questioned Liu about why he did not resist the "right-leaning" actions of Deng Zihui, Chen Yun and others, and rebuked him to his face: "Why are you in such a hurry? Can't you hold your ground? Why can't you hold your ground?" "The Three Red Banners have been refuted, land is being divided up, and you did nothing? What will happen after I die?" Liu Shaoqi replied: "History will record the role you and I played in the starvation of so many people, and the cannibalism will also be memorialized!" Since the Beidaihe Conference in August 1962, Mao Zedong has clearly opposed this Three Freedoms and One Guarantee policy. He criticized the household contract responsibility system supported by Chen Yun, Deng Zihui and others as the so-called "individual farming style". Deng Zihui was criticized and demoted. At the Tenth Plenary Session in September of the same year, Mao emphasized that class struggle should be "talked about every year, every month, and every day."

== Aftermath ==
=== Before and after the Cultural Revolution ===
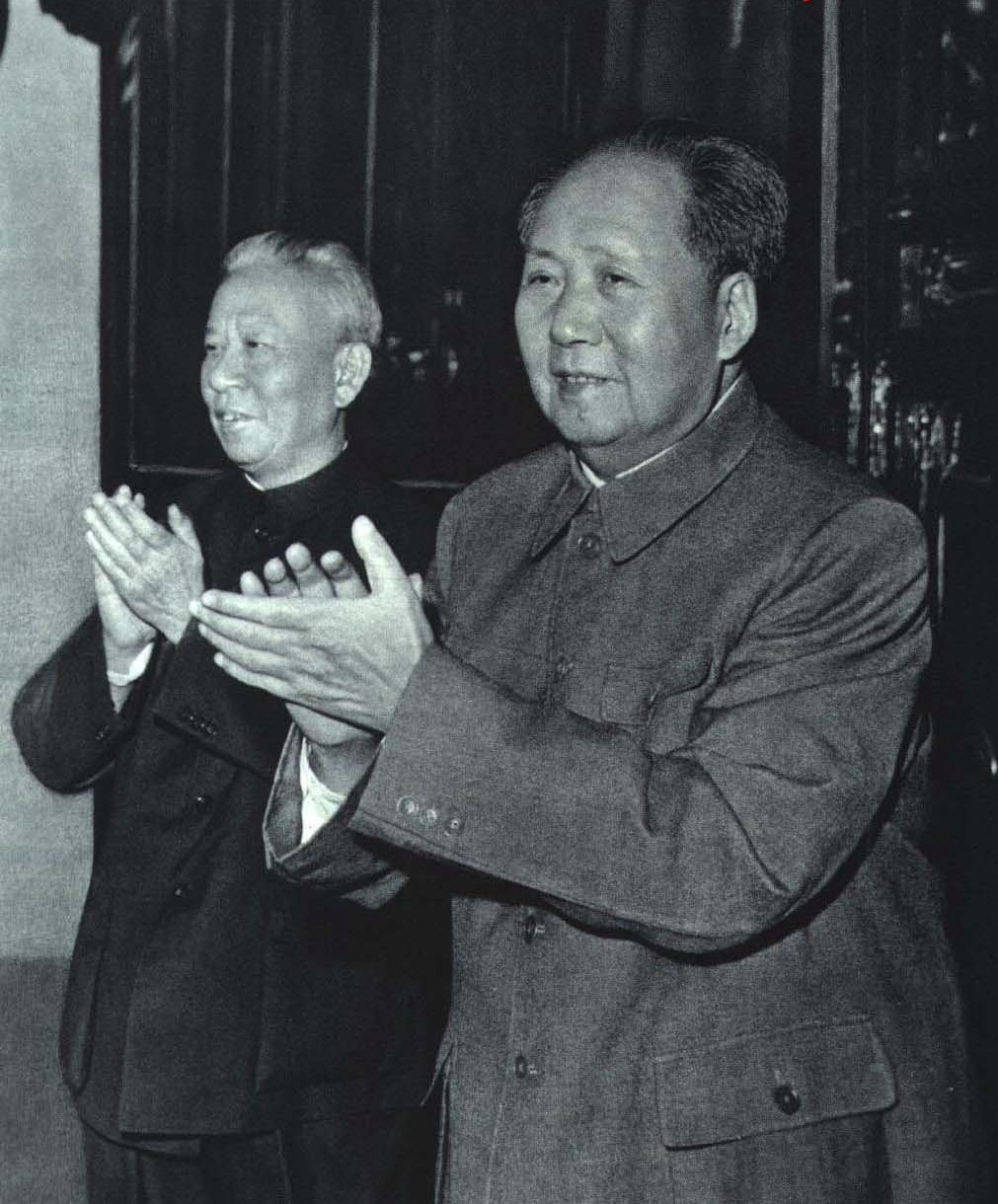
Mao Zedong and Liu Shaoqi at the 15th anniversary celebration of the founding of the People's Republic of China (1964)

In the spring and summer of 1963, Mao launched the Four Cleanups Movement. In May, he delivered a speech entitled "Instructions on Issues Concerning Socialist Education in Rural Areas" at a meeting in Hangzhou, in which he mentioned that "the right bourgeois and middle peasant elements place their hopes on private plots, free markets, self-responsibility for profits and losses, and household contract responsibility, these 'three selfs and one contract.' When we carry out the socialist revolution, we carry out the 'Five Antis' in the cities and the 'Four Cleanups' in the countryside, which is to dig up the social foundation of the bourgeoisie, dig up the roots of capitalism, and dig up the roots of revisionism." In February 1964, when meeting with North Korean leader Kim Il Sung and other foreign guests, Mao mentioned:

In the first half of 1962, some people within our Party advocated "Three Freedoms and One Guarantee" domestically, with the aim of dissolving the socialist collective economy and undermining the socialist system. "Three Peaceful Acts and One Reduction" was their international program, while "Three Freedoms and One Guarantee" was their domestic program. These people included members of the Central Committee, secretaries of the Secretariat, and even vice premiers. Besides them, every ministry, every province, and even more branch secretaries were involved. In the summer, we held working conferences and a plenary session of the Central Committee, exposing all these problems.

In March of the same year, Mao interrupted while listening to a report, "In 1962, there was another uproar about not talking about class and not talking about class struggle. The departments were not stable! Deng Zihui wanted to implement the 'household contract responsibility system'. Wang Jiaxiang used to be sick, but he was healthy for six months. He wanted to implement the 'Three Peaceful Acts and One Reduction' policy. He was very enthusiastic!... At that time, they wanted to implement the 'Three Harmonies and One Reduction' policy internationally and the 'Three Freedoms and One Guarantee' policy domestically."

During the Cultural Revolution, the Three Freedoms and One Guarantee became Liu Shaoqi's "crime" for "taking the capitalist road", and Liu Shaoqi was persecuted to death in 1969. At the same time, as the "second number one capitalist roader" in the Party during the Cultural Revolution, Deng Xiaoping's previous support for the "cat theory" of contracting production to households became one of his "ten major crimes", and he was also criticized and persecuted for a long time.

=== Before and after the reform and opening up ===
In 1977, Deng Xiaoping returned to politics for the third time and, together with Hu Yaobang and others, led the rectification of past wrongs. At the third plenary session of the 11th CCP Central Committee at the end of 1978, the reform and opening up was officially launched. During the reform and opening up, the Three Freedoms and One Guarantee policy became one of the references for rural economic reform. It was closely related to the household contract responsibility system and laid a mass foundation and cadre reserve for the reform of the household contract system to a certain extent. In 1980, Liu Shaoqi was completely rehabilitated by the CCP. In 1993, the household contract responsibility system was written into the state constitution.
