= China's Rural Reform =

China's Rural Reform (also called the Agricultural Reform) was one of the multiple reform and opening up policies implemented in 1978. The reforms were initiated by Deng Xiaoping, the paramount leader of the Chinese Communist Party.

The agricultural reform was the first to be introduced, and resulted in China meeting 4 objectives:

- Increase in agricultural production
- Absorption of farm labor by industries
- Reduction of poverty
- Increase in quality and quantity of food consumption

== Background ==
With the crisis of food shortages that resulted from the two Chinese revolutions and the rapidly growing population, a reform was needed that could ensure stable production of food. However, the pace of reforms was very slow. With the aim of surpassing the United Kingdom and the United States, the Great Leap Forward led by Mao Zedong from 1958 to 1962 focused on industrial development. Producing "backyard steel" to make military equipment became the highest priority and other economic sectors related to the improvement of livelihood of the people such as agriculture and light industry were undervalued. This led to the Great Chinese Famine in 1959 - one of the deadliest famines in history, with estimates of around 36-45 million dead as a result.

To regain power, momentum and consolidate his communist ideology within the party, Mao Zedong initiated the ten-year Cultural Revolution in 1966. Anything associated with capitalism or traditional values were removed. Millions of people fled due to the instability of the country. The 10-year movement crippled the country both politically and economically. The economy was stagnant and countless people died. Moreover, due to Zedong's belief that prosperity of the country comes with a greater population, he encouraged couples to have more children. According to statistics from World Bank, the fertility rate of China peaked in 1966, with each woman giving birth to an average of 6.37 children. This increased birth rate resulted in a 2.78% population growth in 1966, the highest annual growth in China's history. The population growth combined with the stagnant economy resulted in food shortages, which became the rationale for the rural reform.

== Before the reform ==
The Beidaihe conference in 1958 affirmed the centralization of agricultural production. The people's right to own private properties were removed and people's commune became the production unit in the rural area. Prior to the reform, households were divided into collective production units, in which families worked together as a team. As it was difficult to monitor the performance of each person, yields were equally divided among households, disregarding the different degrees of efforts individuals put in. This resulted in low incentives for the farmers to work hard, which led to slacking and inefficiency in production.

== Cause of the reform ==
In the beginning, the agricultural reform was not intended or initiated by the Chinese government, rather, it was initiated by 18 households in Xiaogang Village, Fengyang Xian, Anhui Province. In 1978, Fengyang Xian experienced a serious drought. To overcome the problem, they came up with an arrangement where each household was responsible for their own production. Farming tools and land were equally distributed among the households in return for delivery of fixed output quotas. Each member had the free will to decide which types of crops to grow and they were entitled to sell excess yields in the free market. They were also expected to deal with whatever losses they suffered on their own. This was the prototype of the household responsibility system. This arrangement was completely against the values of the Communist Party, and the villagers could have been prosecuted for it. Because of this, the arrangement was kept a secret without the awareness of higher officials. The arrangement turned out to be successful and soon spread to other parts of Anhui Province and Sichuan Province.

In 1980, Deng Xiaoping publicly announced his endorsement of such policy and this officially began the enforcement of the rural reform.

== Reforms in different sectors ==
=== Institution ===
After the household responsibility system was introduced, the collective farming policy was discarded. The original collectively owned land was reassigned to two or more and their autonomy of production and operation was guaranteed. The farmers were allowed to produce by themselves and were expected to be responsible for their own earnings and losses. They were only required to submit part of the yield as taxes to the government and were entitled to sell the excess gains in the free market. Such institutional reform significantly raised their willingness to work hard and produce a greater yield. With the year of 1978 as the reference point of 100, the crop output increased from 77.10 in 1970 to 148.21 in 1987; the crop output saw an increase of 48.21% in 9 years.

=== Market and planning ===
As the total crop output increased, there was an excess of grains. This excess decreased the market price of the products. Consequently, the government encouraged farmers in grain-sufficient areas to invest in cash crops such as cotton and sugarcane. The area devoted to cash crops increased from 9.6% in 1978 to 13.4% in 1984; a 41.6% increase. The government also encouraged the development of township enterprises that emphasized branding and developing special features. Villages and towns discovered their advantages and focused on specialization in producing specific products. The increase in capital and the use of chemical fertilizers indicated the prevalence of commercialization and agricultural mechanization, which also explains the gradual decrease in farm labor after 1984. As the agricultural production line was increasingly automated, the excess farming labor was released from the rural area into the city to aid in urban development.

== Solution ==
The pragmatic modernists reformed the Chinese economy to guarantee an outflow of surplus value from agriculture to finance the modernization of industry and expansion and modernization of infrastructure (mostly in urban areas). Today and for the entire reform era, the percentage of social investment going to agriculture has been a fraction of the amount of surplus generated in that sector (and less than 2% of the total). According to Fang Gang, writing in the China Rural Survey, "If agriculture's share of national investment were to be brought in line with its share of national income, farm investment would have to rise to over 300 billion yuan (at 1994 prices), or to ten times its current level." In order to raise agricultural productivity surplus investments would be required to be made to improve agriculture from presumably from industry, but the result would be a slowdown in the modernization of industry (with the concomitant slowdown in productivity improvements and "competitiveness" in that sector). Trade related competition will take its toll, either in agriculture or industry or both.
