= Public Notary Office of China =

Public Notary Office (Chinese: 公证处; pinyin: gōng zhèng chù) is a subordinate agency of the Ministry of Justice of the People's Republic of China. It is responsible for certifying documents according to Chinese legal system. Examples of services offered are certification of Birth Certificates, identification cards, Household Registration documents, Driver's License, Police Records, Health Records, Property title, power of attorney, guarantor documents, authorization documents, declaration documents, lottery tickets certification and business licenses.

== Purpose ==
The functions of the Public Notary Office is classified into 4 functions.

1. To safeguard the smooth process of the state economic restructuring and economic construction, maintain the order of socialist market economy.
2. To protect lawful rights and interests of citizens, legal persons and other organizations, prevent disputes and minimize litigation.
3. To develop notary standards and promote the process of the international civil and economic activity. To protect lawful rights and interests of citizens, organizations, overseas Chinese and foreigners.
4. To inform and educate the legal knowledge, improve legal sense of the people, maintain the legal system and guarantee the correct implement of state laws.

== History ==
The Public Notary system was first established between the 1930s to the 1940s. It was enacted into legislation in 1935 by the government of the Republic of China. After the Chinese Civil War, the People's Republic of China in 1951 continued with developing the Public Notary system. The Central People's Government of the PRC or commonly refer to as the State Council took on the administration of the Public Notary system. It created many offices in provincial counties and towns to make it accessible to the common people.

During the period between 1958 and 1959, the Public Notary system languished and due to Cultural Revolution it virtually came to a standstill for the next two decades. The Cultural Revolution expelled the bourgeoisie and capitalist, nationalizing private property, private ownership of businesses and land were prohibited and turn into collective public ownership. This reduced the demand for notarization of documents and legal services.

It was not until 1978 with the central government embarking on market economic reforms that the Public Notary system became very important and relevant. In 1979, the Central People's Government enacting legislation for Public Notary Offices to be set up in all the Municipalities, provincial cities, prefecture level cities and towns. By one measure, there was a 15-fold increase in notarization services in 1979 as compared to 1977. In 1982, all laws and regulations for the public notary system were in place. This increased the efficiency of the system and supported China's experiment with market reforms.

== See also ==
Ministry of Justice of the People's Republic of China
