= Three Peaceful Acts and One Reduction =

Wang Jiaxiang's 1962 foreign policy

The Three Peaceful Acts and One Reduction (Chinese: 三和一少; pinyin: Sānhé yīshǎo) is a critical summary of Wang Jiaxiang's views on foreign affairs by Mao Zedong and others, the chairman of the Chinese Communist Party, in 1962. After the Great Chinese Famine, Wang, Head of the International Department of the Chinese Communist Party, proposed to strive for a peaceful international environment and to provide foreign aid in a realistic and realistic manner. Mao and others summarized it as "to make peace with imperialism, to make peace with revisionism, to make peace with India and reactionaries of various countries, and to provide less support for national liberation movements". Wang was criticized and dismissed from his post as a result, and was rehabilitated in 1979 during the Boluan Fanzheng.

== History ==
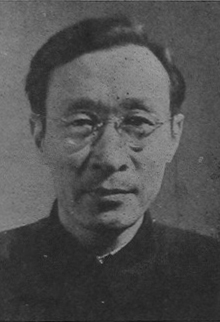
Wang Jiaxiang

From 1959 to 1961, China experienced the Great Chinese Famine, during which tens of millions of people died. However, it was also one of the periods when China provided the most enthusiastic foreign aid. At the same time, the Sino-Soviet split became public, and the two sides argued on issues such as the 14th Dalai Lama in Tibet, the Taiwan Strait crisis, the Sino-Indian border dispute, and the Great Leap Forward. In 1960, the Soviet Union suddenly withdrew 1,390 experts from China and terminated 600 contracts, leading to a deterioration in Sino-Soviet relations.

Following the Seven Thousand Cadres Conference in early 1962, under the severe domestic and international situation, Wang Jiaxiang, then Head of the International Department of the Chinese Communist Party, and others put forward a series of prudent and pragmatic foreign affairs proposals, including that foreign aid should be realistic and within its means, strive for a peaceful international environment, adopt a moderate approach, and pay attention to the strategy of struggle in order to overcome or alleviate difficulties; for this purpose, it is necessary to avoid an open breakdown of Sino-Soviet relations, avoid attracting all the sharpness of American imperialism to China, avoid a Korean-style war, and adopt negotiation to resolve the Sino-Indian dispute. In the spring of 1962, Wang Jiaxiang presided over the writing and review of the outline "On the issue of supporting other countries' anti-imperialist struggle, national independence and people's revolutionary movement - realistic and within its means", believing:

Given the current extraordinary circumstances, we must proceed with extra caution. We must avoid overstepping boundaries, avoid excessive emphasis, and avoid making unwarranted promises of support. When making such promises, we must leave room for maneuver and avoid overestimating our capabilities. In some areas, we may even need to moderately tighten our belts. We must also clarify in advance any issues that we cannot fulfill in the future to avoid being caught off guard.

In July 1962, the World Peace Council held a World Peace Conference in Moscow to fight for universal disarmament. China sent a delegation headed by Mao Dun. The delegation spoke in accordance with the "low-key" policy agreed upon in advance by Liu Shaoqi and Deng Xiaoping, emphasizing the position of upholding the banner of peace. Mao Dun's speech was drafted by Wang Jiaxiang. Wang Jiaxiang believed that in such a disarmament conference, the focus of the speech should be to explain the issue of peace thoroughly. Therefore, the speech highlighted the idea of "peace is precious". The common document adopted by the disarmament conference afterward was much lower in tone than Mao Dun's speech. It did not contain any words against US imperialism. The Soviet Union was also relatively satisfied with the Chinese delegation's approach, but it aroused dissatisfaction among representatives of several Asian and African countries. Mao Zedong then criticized the Chinese delegation, saying, "They have broken away from the left, strengthened the right, and increased the wavering of the centrists."

=== Reactions ===
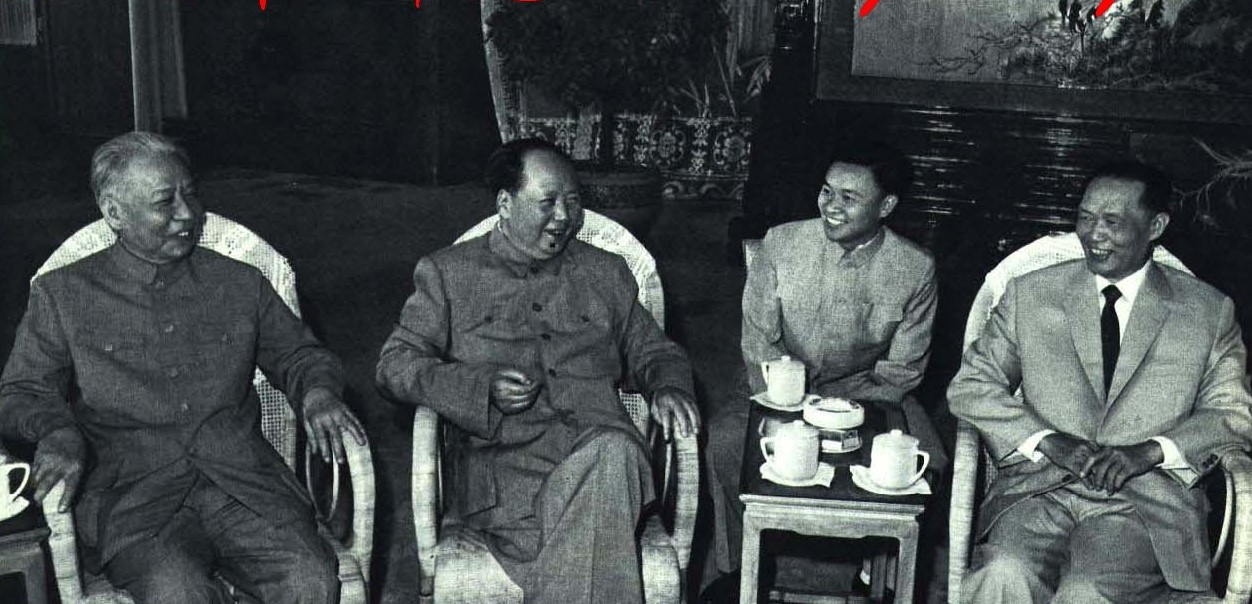
In 1965, Mao Zedong and Liu Shaoqi met with Hoàng Văn Hoan, a leader of the Communist Party of Vietnam

In the summer of 1962, Mao Zedong, Kang Sheng and other leaders of the Chinese Communist Party critically summarized Wang Jiaxiang's views on foreign affairs: "Make peace with imperialism, make peace with revisionism, make peace with India and reactionaries of other countries, and support national liberation movements less", namely, Three Peaceful Acts and One Reduction. At the Beidaihe Central Working Conference held in August, Mao linked the Three Peaceful Acts and One Reduction in foreign policy with the Three Freedoms and One Guarantee in domestic policy, and believed that "new right-leaning thoughts have emerged in the Party". At the 10th Plenary Session held in September, the Three Peaceful Acts and One Reduction was criticized. After that, Wang Jiaxiang was effectively removed from his post as Head of the International Department, moved out of Zhongnanhai, and was no longer an important leader of the Party. Since the 1960s, the Chinese Communist Party has vigorously exported communist revolution in Southeast Asia, providing assistance to communist organizations and guerrilla groups in many countries, including the Communist Party of Indonesia, the Malayan Communist Party, the Communist Party of Vietnam, the Communist Party of Kampuchea, the Communist Party of Burma, the Communist Party of Thailand, and the Communist Party of the Philippines. In February 1964, when meeting with North Korean leader Kim Il Sung and other foreign guests, Mao mentioned again.

In the first half of 1962, some people within our Party advocated "Three Freedoms and One Guarantee" domestically, with the aim of dissolving the socialist collective economy and undermining the socialist system. "Three Peaceful Acts and One Reduction" was their international program, while "Three Freedoms and One Guarantee" was their domestic program. These people included members of the Central Committee, secretaries of the Secretariat, and even vice premiers. Besides them, every ministry, every province, and even more branch secretaries were involved. In the summer, we held working conferences and a plenary session of the Central Committee, exposing all these problems.

In March 1962, Mao interrupted while listening to a report, "In 1962 they were again unable to speak of classes and class struggle how unsteady would each department be! Teng Tzu-hui wanted to 'contract to the households.' In the past Wang Chia-hsiang had always been ill. For that half a year he was healthy and wanted to have 'three reconciliations and one reduction,' with such activism! What we must now do is 'three struggles and one increase.' The United Front Department wants the political parties of the bourgeoisie to become socialist political parties and drew up a five-year plan. They softly, softly fell; it was a surrender to the bourgeoisie. At that time they wanted to carry out 'three reconciliations and one reduction' internationally and 'three freedoms and one contract' domestically. P'eng Teh-huai's letter of attack also came out at that time as did Hsi Chung-hsun's book Liu Chih-tan."

During the Cultural Revolution, Kang Sheng and others further proposed that the diplomatic policy implemented in the 17 years before the founding of the People's Republic of China was "three surrenders and one elimination" (some say that Wang Li elevated "three peace and one reduction" to "three surrenders and one elimination"), and Mao Zedong agreed to criticize it. Wang Jiaxiang was criticized and persecuted, and was placed under house arrest. He died in 1974.

=== Aftermath ===
During the Boluan Fanzheng, in February 1979, the International Department of the CCP Central Committee submitted a "Request for Instructions on the Rehabilitation of the So-called 'Three Peaceful Acts and One Reduction' and 'Three Reductions and One Extinction' Issues" to the CCP Central Committee. On 9 March 1979, the International Department of the CCP Central Committee issued a "Circular on the Rehabilitation of the So-called 'Three Harmonies and One Less' and 'Three Reductions and One Extinction' Issues," which pointed out that the charges of the so-called "Three Harmonies and One Less" and "Three Reductions and One Extinction" revisionist line imposed on the International Department and the entire foreign affairs front by Kang Sheng, the "Gang of Four," and others should be rehabilitated. After the reform and opening up, on the advice of then Singapore Prime Minister Lee Kuan Yew, Deng Xiaoping decided to stop exporting revolution and cut off aid to the communist parties of Southeast Asian countries, which greatly changed the relations between China and the governments of neighboring countries.
