= Household responsibility system (1950s) =

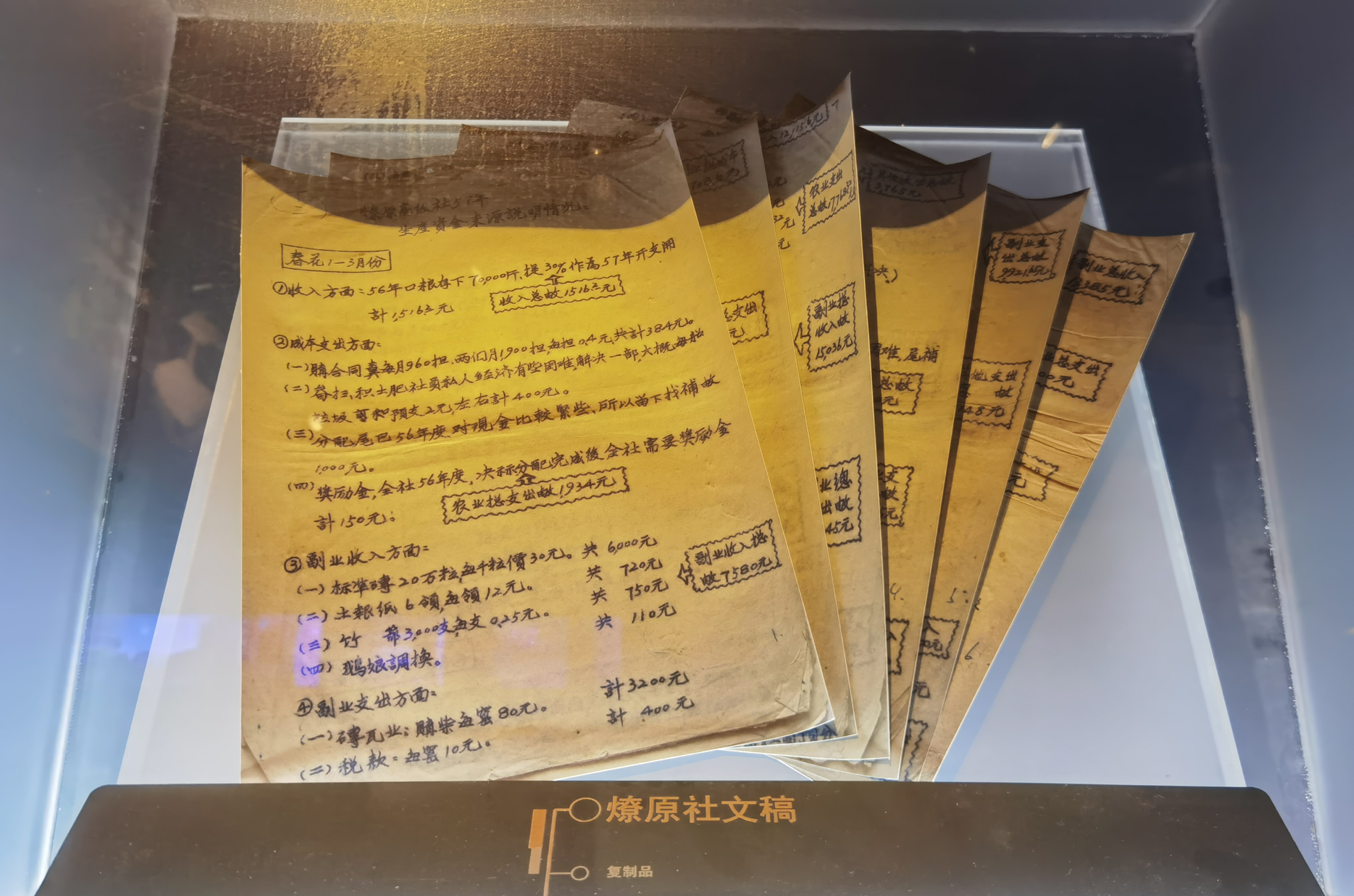
A copy of the archives of the " zhousehold contract responsibility system" in Liaoyuan Cooperative, Yongjia County, Wenzhou City, Zhejiang Province in 1956.

The household responsibility system was a rural reform spontaneously organized by farmers in Sichuan, Anhui, Zhejiang, Guangdong, Hebei and other places in the 1950s of China. It became part of the Three Freedoms and One Guarantee economic policy between 1960 and 1962, and was also the predecessor of the rural joint production contract responsibility system after the reform and opening up. Among them, the reform of Liaoyuan Commune in Yongjia County, Zhejiang Province (now Guoxi Town, Ouhai District, Wenzhou City) was the most famous. Yongjia County is also considered to be the birthplace of the household contract responsibility system.

== History ==
Around 1955, agricultural collectivization movements were launched in Wenzhou and other places. Li Guimao, then secretary of the Yongjia County Party Committee, convened a meeting to discuss the implementation of the "household contract responsibility system". Ultimately, with half supporting and half opposing it, the decision was made to conduct the experiment in Liaoyuan Commune. After the experiment was successful, the "household contract responsibility system" was eventually promoted throughout Yongjia County.

On 27 January 1957, the Zhejiang Daily published a special report entitled "Personal 'Special Control' and 'Household Contract Responsibility' are Good Ways to Solve the Main Contradictions in the Cooperative". However, on 8 March, "Household Contract Responsibility" was suspended, and the Yongjia County Committee was reorganized: the person in charge, Li Guimao, was dismissed from his post; Li Yunhe was classified as a rightist, dismissed from his post, expelled from the Party and sent to the countryside for reform; many other cadres were implicated. In 1981, after being rehabilitated, Li Yunhe and others jointly reported to the higher authorities, requesting a re-evaluation of "Household Contract Responsibility". In January 1982, the No. 1 Document of the Central Committee of the Chinese Communist Party promoted the rural household contract responsibility system. The experiment of household contract responsibility also inspired the later Wenzhou model.
