= Xiaogang, Anhui =

Xiaogang 小岗村
- Village
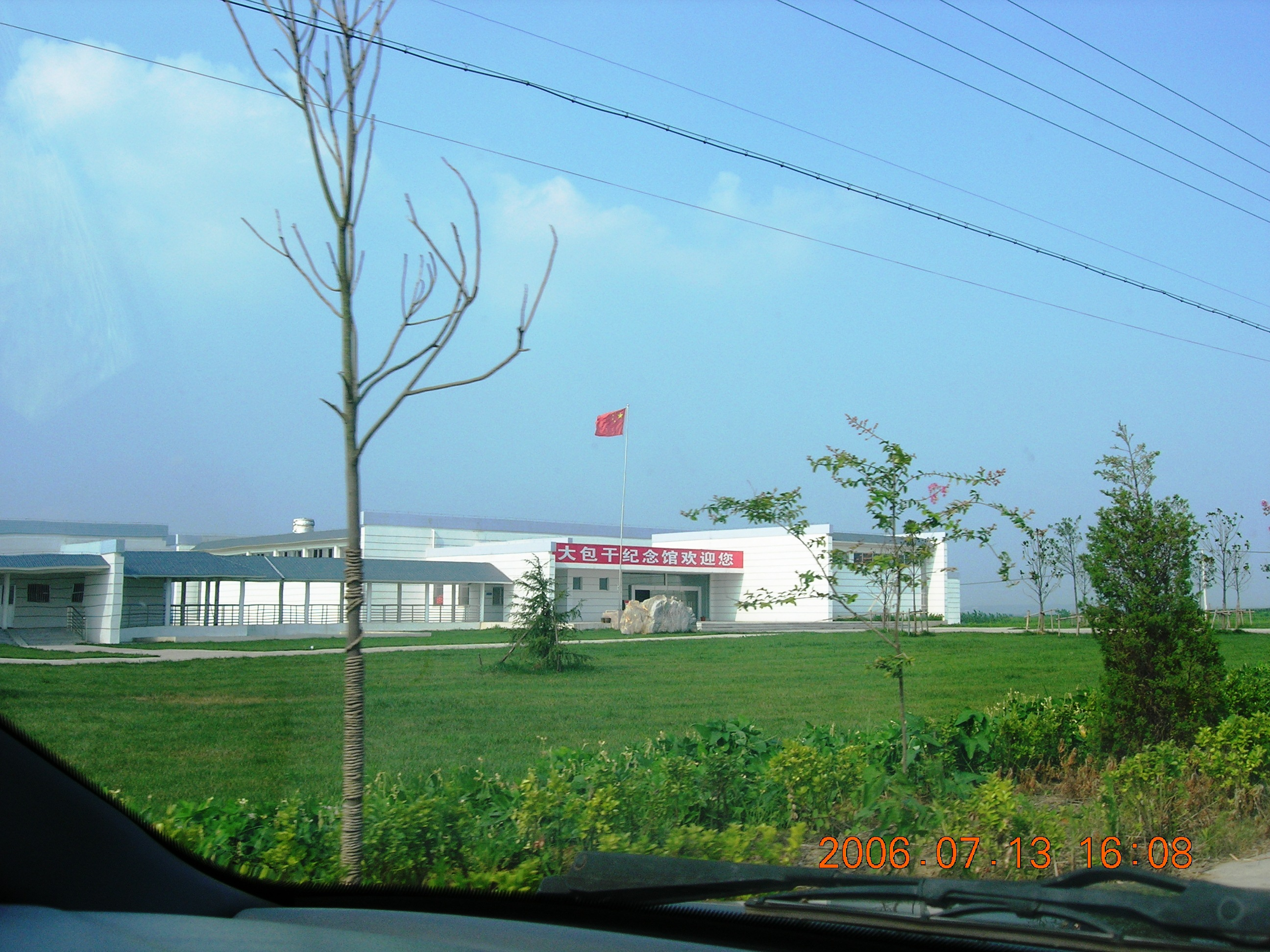
- Da Baogan Commemorative Museum (大包干纪念馆) in Xiaogang Village
- Interactive map of Xiaogang
- Coordinates (Da Baogan Commemorative Museum): 32°49′59″N 117°47′11″E
- Country: People's Republic of China
- Province: Anhui
- Prefecture-level city: Chuzhou
- County: Fengyang
- Town: Xiaoxihe

Population (2008)
  - Total: 3,823
- Time zone: UTC+8 (China Standard Time)
- Website: www.cnxiaogang.com

Xiaogang Village (simplified Chinese: 小岗村; traditional Chinese: 小崗村) is a small village in Xiaoxihe (小溪河镇), Fengyang County, Chuzhou, Anhui province in China, not far from Nanjing, capital of Jiangsu. China's move toward market-orient reform has been traced to an agreement among farmers in Xiaogang to secretly subdivide their common farmland in December 1978, after which the production of grain increased dramatically. The village was held up as a model for agricultural reform by China's new leadership after Deng Xiaoping came to power.

== History ==
During the Great Leap Forward, the Chinese Communist Party made a series of economic reforms, where the most disastrous of them was the collectivization of the administration of private property, especially, the rural lands. Fengyang County, along with much of the rest of the country, experienced a period of famine, due to the inefficiency of the model. A quarter of the local county's population died from starvation. In Xiaogang village alone, 67 villagers died of starvation out of a population of 120 between 1958 and 1960.

In December 1978, eighteen of the local farmers, led by Yen Jingchang, met in the largest house in the village. They agreed to break the law at the time by signing a secret agreement to divide the land, a local People's Commune, into family plots. Each plot was to be worked by an individual family who would turn over some of what they grew to the government and the collective whilst at the same time agreeing that they could keep the surplus for themselves. The villagers also agreed that should one of them be caught and sentenced to death that the other villagers would raise their children until they were eighteen years old. At the time, the villagers were worried that another famine might strike the village after a particularly bad harvest and more people might die of hunger.

After this secret reform, Xiaogang village produced a harvest that was larger than the previous five years combined. Per capita income in the village increased from 22 yuan to 400 yuan with grain output increasing to 90,000 kg in 1979. This attracted significant attention from surrounding villages and before long the government in Beijing had found out. The villagers were fortunate in that at the time China had just changed leadership after the death of Mao Zedong. The new leadership under Deng Xiaoping was looking for ways to reform China's economy and the discovery of Xiaogang's innovation was held up as a model to other villages across the country. This led to the abandonment of collectivised farming across China by 1983 and a large increase in agricultural production. The secret signing of the contract in Xiaogang is widely regarded by Chinese historians and media as the beginning of the period of rapid economic growth and industrialisation that mainland China has experienced ever since.
