= Household responsibility system =

Practice in China, first adopted in 1979

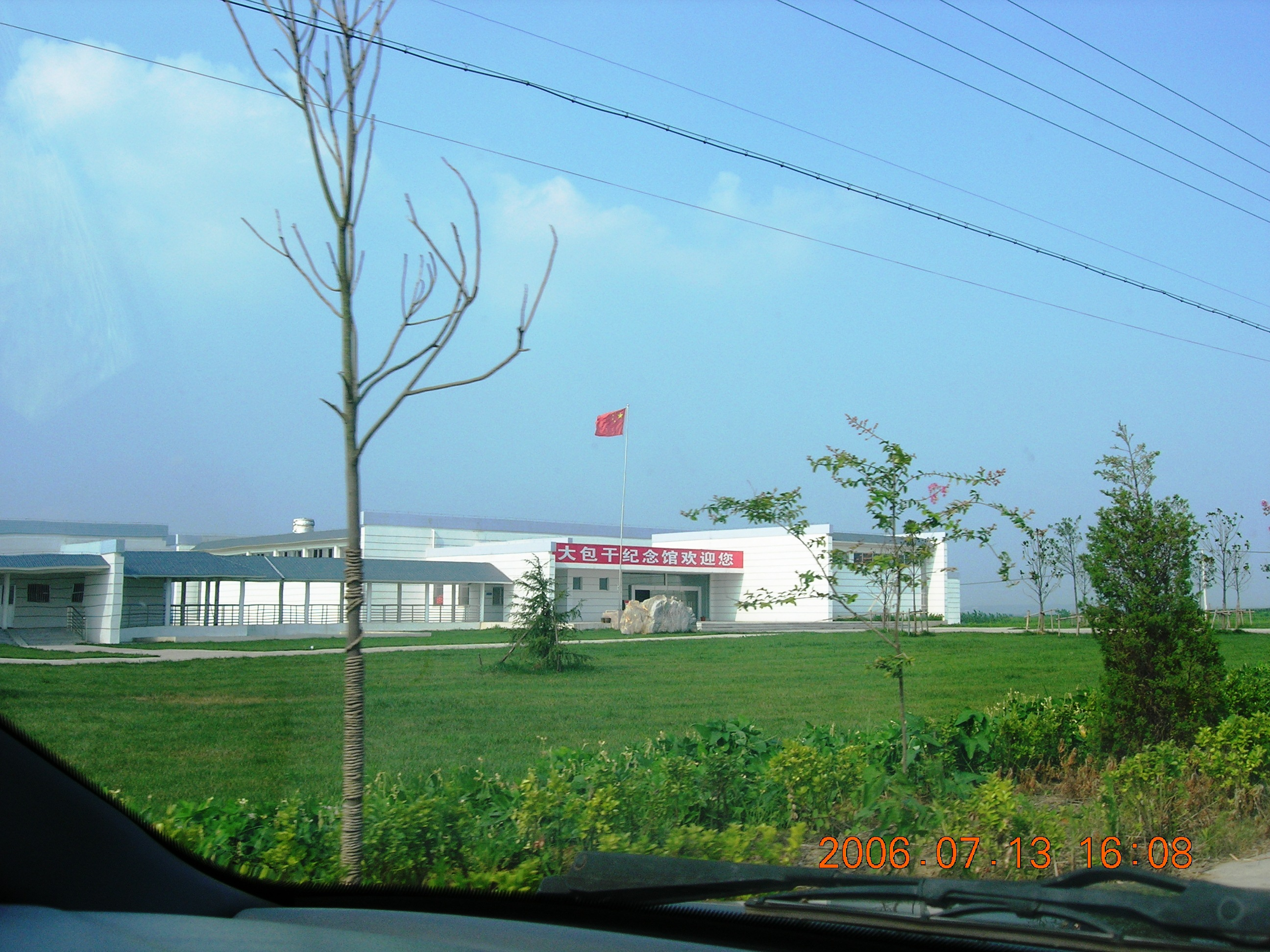
Memorial of the household responsibility system in Xiaogang, Anhui.

The household responsibility system (simplified Chinese: 家庭联产承包责任制; traditional Chinese: 家庭聯產承包責任制; pinyin: jiātíng liánchǎn chéngbāo zérènzhì), or contract responsibility system, was a practice in China, first adopted in agriculture in 1979 and officially established in 1982 during the early phase of Reform and Opening, by which households are held responsible for the profits and losses of an enterprise. This system, which came to replace collective farming, maintained public ownership of land and some of the means of production, but made production the responsibility of households. Households still had to contribute to state quotas but could make their own decisions about what to plant on contracted land and could sell via a multi-tier price system that included the lowest price for payment to the state up until the quota, a higher rate for above-quota sales to the state, and market price for crops allowed to be sold at fairs.

== Overview ==
The household responsibility system replaced collective farming. In the household responsibility systems, households contributed to state quotas but could also make their own decisions about what to plant on contracted land and could sell via a multi-tier price system that included the lowest price for payment to the state up until the quota, a higher rate for above-quota sales to the state, and market price for crops allowed to be sold at fairs. This was enabled by three policy changes: (1) the state increased the price it paid to purchase staple crops, as well as some other agricultural products, (2) the state reduced the number of agricultural products which were subject to state monopsony and monopoly, and (3) the state reestablished rural markets for produce and other commodities.

Agricultural production increased under the household responsibility system, which in Chinese Marxist discourse was described as liberating the productive forces.

== History ==
=== 1977–1978: Preparation period ===
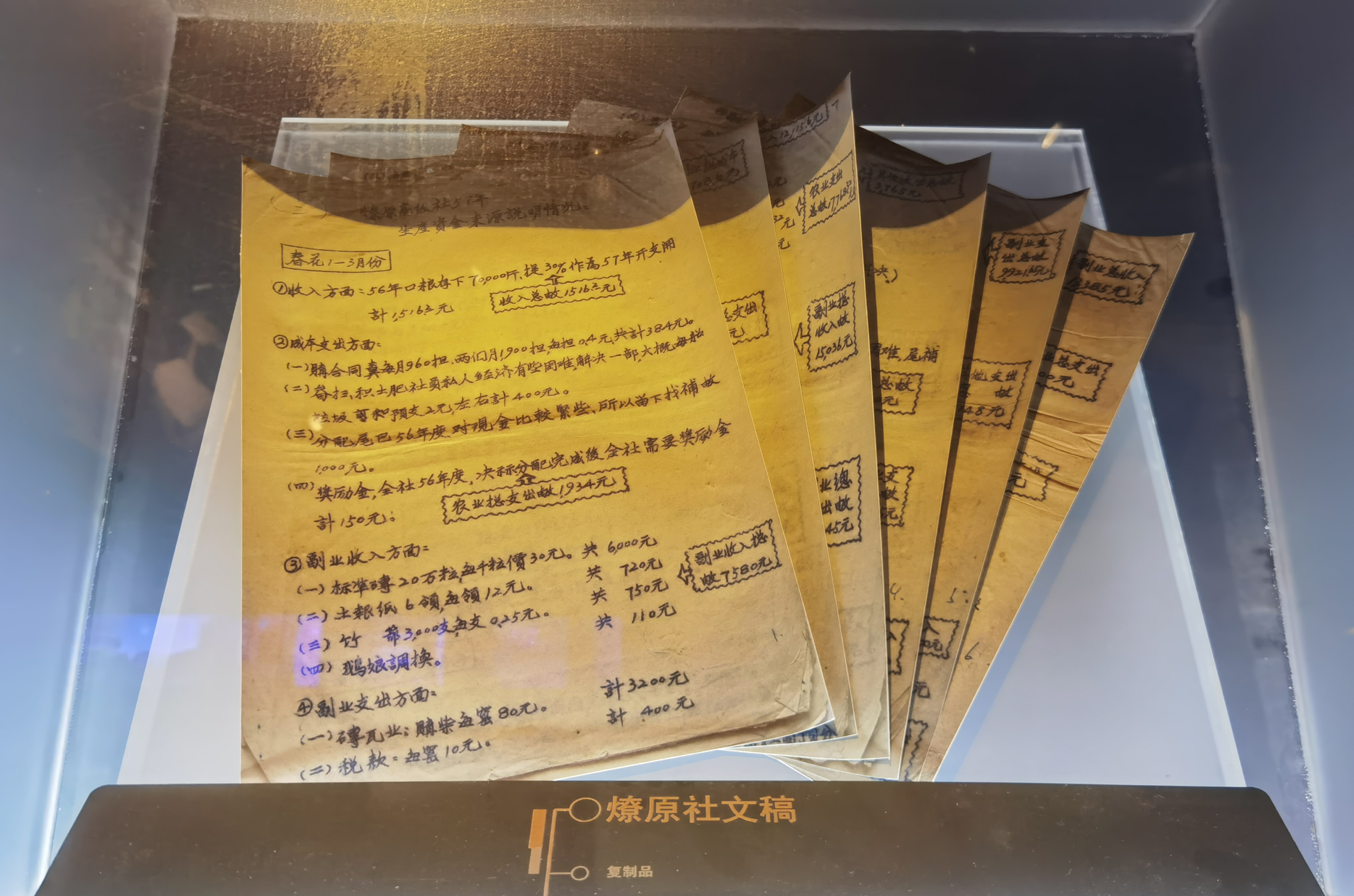
A copy of the archives of the "household contract responsibility system" in Yongjia County, Wenzhou in 1956.

By the late 1970s, China's collectivization and centralization of agricultural production faced several challenges, of which the shortage of agricultural products was the most urgent and serious. Droughts in rural areas resulted in serious food supply crises in urban regions. Some dissatisfied peasants began redistributing land to households on the condition that each would contribute output to the government. In 1978, 18 households in Xiaogang, Anhui came up with a new arrangement where each household was responsible for their profit and losses of production, which was known as the first trial of the household responsibility system. Due to this arrangement, the 18 households were able to produce significantly more on their farms. Yen Jingchang, one of the farmers part of the original agreement, noted that "We all secretly competed, everyone wanted to produce more than the next person." This dramatic rise in output caught the eye of local officials, putting the farmers at risk. However, due to previous agricultural production struggles, the Chinese Communist Party would ultimately adopt this system and hold the farmers up as a model.

In December 1978, the Third Plenary Session of the 11th Central Committee of the Chinese Communist Party proposed "devolving production responsibility to production units" (包产到组). However, the policy still prohibited delegating production responsibility to households (包产到户).

Initially, these policies were only allowed as an exception applicable to poor and remote areas where peasants struggled for subsistence. A political disagreement developed over whether household contracting should also be permitted in places where collective farming had performed well. Opponents of household contracting included leaders who believed it would be a backwards step ideologically, as well as provincial leaders who anticipated that household contracting would weaken mechanized agricultural production.

=== 1979–1981: Struggling back and forth ===
In early 1979, the National Agriculture Council was founded, which started a heated debate over whether China should adopt the household responsibility system within the Chinese central government. In March 1979, the National Agriculture Council held the Seven Provinces and Three Counties Meeting on Agriculture Development, during which the majority of representatives displayed a supportive attitude towards this proposal. However, the opposing voices were also strong. Wang Renchong, the Head of the National Agriculture Council, kept emphasizing the advantages of the collective economy and opposing the idea. In the end, Hua Guofeng, the Chairman of the Chinese Communist Party at the time, concluded that collective production did work, yet a certain amount of flexibility was also needed. Also, Hua Guofeng agreed that "for the impoverished households in remote regions, it is appropriate to delegate to them the responsibility and rights for their production." Hua Guofeng's words were written into the official documents of the Central Committee of the Chinese Communist Party and it was the first time that the idea of household responsibility system appeared in the official document of the Central Committee of the CCP.

In January 1980, the People's Communes Management Meeting was held in Beijing. In the meeting, Zhou Yueli, the Director of the Agricultural Committee of Anhui Province, introduced the system of agriculture development in Anhui. Zhou reported that by the end of 1979, 51% of production teams had adopted the production unit responsibility system, and 10% had adopted the household responsibility system; there was a significant production growth and 25% of the underdeveloped regions asked to adopt the household responsibility system. However, Zhou's idea received severe criticism from many representatives from other regions and provoked a huge debate over whether the household responsibility system was the right approach to take. In the end, Deng Xiaoping concluded the debate with the observation that household responsibility was a highly complicated and critical issue, and that it was unlikely to reach a simple conclusion.

While the central government was still struggling with the idea, going back and forth, more and more villages went ahead and started adopting the household responsibility system. After some pilot programs, the household production responsibility system was promoted broadly in 1979.

In April 1980, at the Long-term Planning Meeting of the Central Committee of CCP, Deng Xiaoping argued: "In underdeveloped and impoverished regions such as Northwestern China, Guizhou, and Yunnan province, approaches such as household responsibility system should be adopted". During another speech in May, Deng Xiaoping supported the practice of Fengyang County and Feixi County of Anhui province and said that "[s]ome colleagues worried that to practice this kind of system might hamper the development of the collective economy. I think these worries are unnecessary. Our overall direction is developing a collective economy. As long as the productivity increases and the division of labor and commodity economy develop, our collective economy will grow from a low level to a high level."

Besides the positive attitude towards the household responsibility system of Deng Xiaoping, the National Agriculture Council also conducted intense field research in Henan, Hebei, and other provinces to better understand the effectiveness and challenges of adopting the system. From 1980 to 1981, more and more collective agricultural production systems were transformed into household responsibility systems. By 1981, 51% of the households in Southeast provinces and Shandong province had already adopted the household responsibility system.

=== 1982: Official establishment ===
In December 1981, the National Agricultural Work Meeting was held in Beijing, which emphasized the idea of letting people choose by themselves which systems to use. Soon later in 1982, the Central Committee of the CCP announced its "No. 1 document" for the year, Minutes of The National Agricultural Work Meeting, which officially established the household responsibility system for China's agricultural production.

The household responsibility system achieved "total victory" in 1983. The reluctance of the leadership of some provinces to adopt the system was overcome by studies showing that the peasants strongly favored being responsible for their own production, which provided important support for Premier Zhao Ziyang's approach of "letting the masses decide for themselves in which way they want to organize the production."

Another success of the household responsibility system was its price stabilization effects for peasants. By 1984, the supply of grain had increased so much that the price paid by the state for the grain quote and above-quota procurement were both higher than the market price for grain. Thus, "selling the quota at the planned price was no longer a tax but a subsidy for the peasants, and selling the surplus above the quota to the state protected the peasants from bearing the whole burden of the falling market prices." Peasants were simultaneously encouraged to increase agricultural productivity while being protected from the fall of market prices caused by the production boom. The price stabilization effects of the household responsibility system's multi-track pricing were an intentional design to regulate agricultural output through state participation in the market.

By 1985, each household responsibility system contract specified a quota output to sell to the government, with the rest of the output capable of being consumed or sold on the market.

The success of the household responsibility system signified a significant transition in China's economic model and opened a new era of China's agricultural economy and rural development.

== Recent analyses ==
According to a 2021 study, the household responsibility system improved individuals' later-life health, education, and labor market outcomes, but it reduced human capital investment in children, making them less likely to receive education and more likely to remain in agriculture.

== See also ==
- Reform and opening up
- Economic history of China (1949-present)
- Economy of China
- History of agriculture in China
- Township and Village Enterprises (TVE)
