= List of statutes of China =

The following is an incomprehensive list of the statutes of the People's Republic of China, classified and ordered according to its Ministry of Justice. The laws in each sections are listed in chronological order of the year they were passed.

== Constitution and related laws ==
=== Constitution ===
Passed	Laws	Voting results (Yea / Nay / Abstain)	Amendment(s)
4 December 1982	Constitution		1988, 1993, 1999, 2004, 2018

=== Constitution-related laws ===
Laws	Passed	Voting results (Yea / Nay / Abstain)	Amendment(s)
Organic Law of the People's Procuratorates	1 July 1979		1983, 1986, 2018
Organic Law of the People's Courts	1 July 1979		1983, 1986, 2006, 2018
Organization Law for Local People's Congresses at All Levels and Local People's Governments at All Levels	1 July 1979		1982, 1986, 1995, 2004, 2015, 2022
Election Law for the National People's Congress and Local People's Congresses at All Levels	1 July 1979		1982, 1986, 1995, 2004, 2010, 2015, 2020
Nationality Law	10 September 1980		
Measures for the Election of Deputies from the Chinese People's Liberation Army to the National People's Congress and the Local People's Congresses at and above the County Level	6 October 1981		1996, 2012, 2021
Organic Law of the State Council	10 December 1982		2024
Organic Law of the National People's Congress	10 December 1982		2021
Several Provisions on the Direct Election of Deputies to People's Congresses Below the County Level	5 March 1983		
Law on Regional National Autonomy	31 May 1984		2001
Regulations Concerning Diplomatic Privileges and Immunities	5 September 1986		
Decision on the Establishment of Maritime Courts in Coastal Port Cities	14 November 1984		
Regulations on Diplomatic Privileges and Immunities	5 September 1986		
Rules of Procedure of the Standing Committee of the National People's Congress	24 November 1987		2009
Provisions on Awarding the Chinese People's Liberation Army Medal of Merit to Retired Military Cadres	1 July 1988		
Rules of Procedure for the National People's Congress	4 April 1989		2021
Law on Assemblies, Processions and Demonstrations	31 October 1989		2009, 2022
Organic Law of the Urban Residents Committee	26 December 1989		2018
Basic Law of the Hong Kong Special Administrative Region	4 April 1990		
Law on the National Flag	28 June 1990		2009, 2020
Regulations Concerning Consular Privileges and Immunities	30 October 1990		
Law on the Procedure of the Conclusion of Treaties	28 December 1990		
Law on the National Emblem	2 March 1991		2009, 2020
Law on the Territorial Sea and the Contiguous Zone	25 February 1992		
Law on Deputies to the National People's Congress and Local People's Congresses at All Levels	3 April 1992		2009, 2010, 2015
Basic Law of the Macao Special Administrative Region	31 March 1993		
State Compensation Law	12 May 1994		2010, 2012
Public Procurators Law	28 February 1995		2001, 2017, 2019
Judges Law	28 February 1995		2001, 2017, 2019
Martial Law	1 March 1996		
Lawyers Law	15 May 1996		2001, 2007, 2012, 2019
Law on Garrisoning the Hong Kong Special Administrative Region	30 December 1996		
National Defense Law	14 March 1997		2009, 2020
Law on the Exclusive Economic Zone and the Continental Shelf	26 June 1998		
Organic Law of the Villagers' Committees	4 November 1998		2010, 2018
Law on Garrisoning the Macao Special Administrative Region	28 June 1999		
Legislation Law	15 March 2000		2015, 2023
Anti-Secession Law	14 March 2005	2896 / 0 / 2	
Law on Immunity of the Property of Foreign Central Banks from Compulsory Judicial Measures	25 October 2005		
Law on the Supervision of Standing Committees of People's Congresses at Various Levels	27 August 2006	155 / 1 / 5	2024
National Security Law	1 July 2015	154 / 0 / 1	
Law on National Medals and National Honorary Titles	27 December 2015	157 / 0 / 2	
National Anthem Law	1 September 2017	146 / 0 / 1	
Supervision Law	20 March 2018	2914 / 28 / 18	2024
People's Jury Law	27 April 2018		
Heroes and Martyrs Protection Law	27 April 2018		
Law on Governmental Sanctions for Public Employees	20 June 2020		
Law on Safeguarding National Security in Hong Kong	30 June 2020		
Anti-Foreign Sanctions Law	10 June 2021		
Ombudsman Law	20 August 2021		
Land Boundary Law	23 October 2021		
Foreign Relations Law	28 June 2023		
Foreign State Immunity Law	1 September 2023		
Patriotic Education Law	24 June 2023		
Law on Legal Publicity and Education	12 September 2025		

== Criminal laws ==
Laws	Passed	Voting results (Yea / Nay / Abstain)	Amendment(s)
Criminal Law	1 July 1979		1997, 1999, 2001(1), 2001(2), 2002, 2005, 2006, 2009, 2011, 2015, 2017, 2020, 2023
Decision of the NPCSC on Punishing Crimes of Fraudulent Purchase of Foreign Exchange, Foreign Exchange Evasion and Illegal Foreign Exchange Trading	29 December 1998		
Counterespionage Law	1 November 2014	156 / 0 / 1	2023
Anti-Organized Crime Law	24 December 2021		
Anti-Telecom Network Fraud Law	2 September 2022		

== Civil and commercial laws ==
Laws	Passed	Voting results (Yea / Nay / Abstain)	Amendment(s)
Marriage Law	10 September 1980		2001
Law of Succession	10 April 1985		
Law of Industrial Enterprises Owned by the Whole People	13 April 1988		2009
Copyright Law	7 September 1990		2001, 2010
Adoption Law	29 December 1991		1998
Maritime Law	7 November 1992		
Company Law	29 December 1993		1999, 2004, 2005, 2013, 2018
Law on Commercial Banks	10 May 1995		2003, 2015
Negotiable Instruments Law	10 May 1995		2004
Insurance Law	30 June 1995		2002, 2009, 2014, 2015
The Guarantee Law	30 June 1995		
Auction Law	5 July 1996		2004, 2015
Partnership Enterprise Law	23 February 1997		2006
Securities Law	29 December 1998		2004, 2005, 2013, 2014, 2019
Contract Law	15 March 1999		
The Bidding Law	30 August 1999		2017
Law on Individual Proprietorship Enterprises	30 August 1999		
Trust Law	28 April 2001		
Law on the Promotion of Small and Medium-Sized Enterprises	29 June 2002		2017
Law on Rural Land Contracting	29 August 2002		2009, 2018
Electronic Signature Law	28 August 2004		2015, 2019
Law on Farmers' Professional Cooperatives	31 October 2006	143 / 1 / 1	2017
Enterprise Bankruptcy Law	27 August 2006		
Property Law	16 March 2007	2799 / 52 / 31	2017
Tort Law	26 December 2009	139 / 10 / 15	2017
Law on Choice of Law for Foreign-related Civil Relationships	28 October 2010		
General Provisions of the Civil Law	15 March 2017	2782 / 30 / 21	
E-Commerce Law	31 August 2018	167 / 1 / 3	

== Administrative laws ==
Laws	Passed	Voting results (Yea / Nay / Abstain)	Amendment(s)
Regulations on Household Registration	9 January 1958		
Regulations on Academic Degrees	12 February 1980		2004
Marine Environment Protection Law	23 August 1982		1999, 2013, 2016, 2017
Cultural Relics Protection Law	19 November 1982		1991, 2002, 2007, 2013, 2015, 2017, 2024
Maritime Traffic Safety Law	2 September 1983		2016, 2021
Water Pollution Prevention and Control Law	11 May 1984		1996, 2008, 2017
Military Service Law	31 May 1984		1998, 2009, 2011, 2021
Pharmaceutical Administration Law	20 September 1984		2001, 2013, 2015, 2019
Compulsory Education Law	12 April 1986		2006, 2015, 2018
Land Administration Law	25 June 1986		1988, 1998, 2004, 2019
Frontier Health and Quarantine Law	2 December 1986		1986, 2007, 2009, 2018, 2024
Customs Law	22 January 1987		2000, 2013(1), 2013(2), 2016, 2017, 2021
Atmospheric Pollution Prevention and Control Law	5 September 1987		1995, 2000, 2015, 2018
Regulations of the Military Ranks of Officers of the Chinese People's Liberation Army	1 July 1988		1994
Archives Law	5 September 1987		1996, 2016
Law on Guarding State Secrets	5 September 1988		2010, 2024
Regulations on the Military Service of Officers in Active Service	5 September 1988		1994, 2000
Wildlife Protection Law	8 November 1988		2004, 2009, 2016, 2018, 2022
Law on Prevention and Treatment of Infectious Diseases	21 February 1989		2004, 2013
Marine Environment Protection Law	26 December 1989		2014
Law on the Protection of Military Installations	23 February 1990		2009, 2014, 2021
Regulations on the Police Ranks of the People's Police	1 July 1992		2009
Surveying and Mapping Law	28 December 1992		2002, 2017
Law on Scientific and Technological Progress	2 July 1993		2007, 2021
Teachers Law	31 October 1993		2009
Urban Real Estate Administration Law	5 July 1994		2007, 2009, 2019
Law on Maternal and Infant Health Care	27 October 1994		2009, 2017
Prison Law	29 December 1994		2012
People's Police Law	28 February 1995		2012
Education Law	18 March 1995		2009, 2015, 2021
Reserve Officers Law	10 May 1995		2010
Law on Physical Culture and Sports	29 August 1995		2009, 2016, 2022
Law on the Prevention and Control of Environment Pollution Caused by Solid Wastes	30 October 1995		2004, 2013, 2015, 2016, 2020
Law on Administrative Penalty	17 March 1996		2009, 2017, 2021
Law on Promoting the Transformation of Scientific and Technological Achievements	15 May 1996		2015
Vocation Education Law	15 May 1996		
Gun Control Law	5 July 1996		2009, 2015
Civil Air Defense Law	29 October 1996		2009
Law on Prevention and Control of Pollution from Environmental Noise	29 October 1996		2018
Construction Law	1 November 1997		2011, 2019
Law on Protecting Against and Mitigating Earthquake Disasters	29 December 1997		2008
Law on Blood donation	29 December 1997		
Fire Protection Law	29 April 1998		2008, 2019, 2021
Law on Practicing Doctors	26 June 1998		2009
Higher Education Law	29 August 1998		2015, 2018
Administrative Reconsideration Law	29 April 1999		2009, 2017, 2023
Meteorology Law	31 October 1999		2009, 2014, 2016
Law on the Standard Spoken and Written Chinese Language	31 October 2000		
National Defense Education Law	28 April 2001		2018, 2024
Law on Desert Prevention and Transformation	31 August 2001		2018
Law on Population and Family Planning	29 December 2001		2015, 2021
Law on Promulgation of Science and Technology	29 June 2002		
Law on Environmental Impact Assessment	28 October 2002		2016, 2018
Non-state Education Promotion Law	28 December 2002		2013, 2016, 2018
Regulations on Customs Titles	28 February 2003		
Law on Resident Identity Cards	28 June 2003		2011
Law on Prevention and Control of Radioactive Pollution	28 June 2003		
Administrative License Law	27 August 2003		2019
Road Traffic Safety Law	28 October 2003		2007, 2011, 2021
Civil Servant Law	27 April 2005		2017, 2018
Notary Law	28 August 2005		2015, 2017
Law on Penalties for Administration of Public Security	28 August 2005		2012, 2025
Public Security Administration Punishments Law	29 April 2006		
Emergency Response Law	30 August 2007	152 / 0 / 0	2024
Urban and Rural Planning Law	28 October 2007		2015, 2019
Narcotics Control Law	29 December 2007		
Food Safety Law	28 February 2009	158 / 3 / 4	2015, 2018, 2021
Law on the People's Armed Police Force	27 August 2009	153 / 1 / 1	2020
Law on Diplomatic Personnel Stationed Abroad	31 October 2009	140 / 1 / 2	
Island Protection Law	26 December 2009	155 / 0 / 9	
National Defense Mobilization Law	26 February 2010	157 / 1 / 1	
Intangible Cultural Heritage Law	25 February 2011	155 / 2 / 0	
Administrative Compulsion Law	30 June 2011	145 / 1 / 7	
Exit-Entry Administration Law	30 June 2012		
Mental Health Law	26 October 2012		2018
Counterterrorism Law	27 December 2015	158 / 1 / 0	2018
Film Industry Promotion Law	7 November 2016	146 / 1 / 8	
Law of Traditional Chinese Medicine	25 December 2016	144 / 3 / 3	
Public Cultural Service Guarantee Law	25 December 2016	148 / 0 / 2	
National Intelligence Law	27 June 2017		2018
Nuclear Safety Law	1 September 2017	145 / 0 / 2	
Law on Public Libraries	4 November 2017	145 / 2 / 2	2018
Law on the Protection of Heroes and Martyrs	27 April 2018	170 / 0 / 0	
Soil Pollution Prevention and Control Law	31 August 2018	171 / 0 / 0	
Law on International Criminal Judicial Assistance	26 October 2018	171 / 0 / 1	
Regulation on Fire and Rescue Ranks	26 October 2018	167 / 1 / 4	
Vaccine Administration Law	29 June 2019	170 / 0 / 1	
Cryptography Law	26 October 2019		
Law on the Promotion of Basic Medical and Health Care	28 December 2019	164 / 0 / 4	
Community Correction Law	28 December 2019	168 / 0 / 0	
Biosafety Law	17 October 2020		2024
Coast Guard Law	22 January 2021		
Anti-Food Waste Law	29 April 2021		
Military Status and Rights Protection Act	10 June 2021		
Physicians Law	20 August 2021		
Noise Pollution Prevention and Control Act	24 December 2021		
Decision on the Rank System for Active-Duty Soldiers of the People's Liberation Army	28 February 2022		
Reservists Act	30 December 2022		
Qinghai-Tibet Plateau Ecological Protection Law	26 April 2023		
Degree Law	26 April 2024		
Preschool Education Act	8 November 2024		
Emergency Response Law	12 September 2025		

== Economic laws ==
Laws	Passed	Voting results (Yea / Nay / Abstain)	Amendment(s)
Individual Income Tax Law	10 September 1980		1993, 1999, 2005, 2007(1), 2007(2), 2011, 2018
Trademark Law	23 August 1982		1993, 2001, 2013, 2019
Statistics Law	8 December 1983		1996, 2009
Forest Law	20 September 1984		1998, 2009, 2019
Accounting Law	21 January 1985		1993, 1999, 2017
Grassland Law	18 June 1985		2002, 2009, 2013
Metrology Law	6 September 1985		2009, 2013, 2015, 2017, 2018
Fisheries Law	20 January 1986		2000, 2004, 2009, 2013
Mineral Resources Law	19 March 1986		1996, 2009
Postal Law	2 December 1986		2009, 2012, 2015
Standardization Law	29 December 1988		2017
Law on Import and Export Commodity Inspection	21 February 1989		2002, 2013, 2018(1), 2018(2)
Railway Law	7 September 1990		2009, 2015
Law on Tobacco Monopoly	29 June 1991		2009, 2013, 2015
Water and Soil Conservation Law	29 June 1991		2010
Law on the Entry and Exit Animal and Plant Quarantine	30 October 1991		2009
Tax Collection Administration Law	4 September 1992		1995, 2001, 2015
Product Quality Law	22 February 1993		2000, 2009, 2018
Agriculture Law	2 July 1993		2002, 2012
Law on the Popularization of Agricultural Technology	2 July 1993		2012
Anti-Unfair Competition Law	2 September 1993		2017, 2019
Law on Certified Public Accountants	31 October 1993		2014
Law on the Protection of Consumer Rights and Interests	31 October 1993		2009, 2013
Law on Protection of Investment by Compatriots from Taiwan	5 March 1994		2016, 2019
Budget Law	22 March 1994		2014, 2018
Foreign Trade Law	12 May 1994		2004, 2016
Audit Law	31 August 1994		2006
Advertising Law	27 October 1994		2015, 2018
Law on the People's Bank of China	18 March 1995		2003
Civil Aviation Law	30 October 1995		2009, 2015, 2016, 2017, 2018
Electric Power Law	28 December 1995		2009, 2015, 2018
Coal Industry Law	29 August 1996		2011, 2013, 2016
Law on Township Enterprises	29 October 1996		
Highway Law	3 July 1997		1999, 2004, 2009, 2016, 2017
Animal Epidemic Prevention Law	3 July 1997		2007, 2013, 2015
Energy Conservation Law	1 November 1997		2007, 2016, 2018
Law on Flood Control	1 November 1997		2007, 2016
Price Law	29 December 1997		
Water Law	21 January 1998		2002, 2009, 2016
Seed Law	8 July 2000		2004, 2013, 2015
Law on the Administration of Sea Areas	27 October 2001		
Government Procurement Law	29 June 2002		2014
Cleaner Production Promotion Law	29 June 2002		2012
Law on Ports	28 June 2003		2015, 2017, 2018
Securities Investment Fund Law	28 October 2003		2012, 2015
Banking Supervision Law	27 December 2003		2006
Law on Promotion of Agricultural Mechanization	25 June 2004		2018
Renewable Energy Law	28 February 2005		2009
Animal Husbandry Law	29 December 2005		2015
Agricultural Product Quality Safety Law	29 April 2006		2018
Anti-Money Laundering Law	31 October 2006	144 / 0 / 1	
Enterprise Income Tax Law	16 March 2007	2826 / 37 / 22	2017, 2018
Labor Contract Law	29 June 2007		2012
Anti-Monopoly Law	30 August 2007	150 / 0 / 2	
Circular Economy Promotion Law	29 August 2008	155 / ? / ?	2018
Law on the State-Owned Assets of Enterprises	28 October 2008	150 / 0 / 4	
Oil and Natural Gas Pipeline Protection Law	25 June 2010	141 / 7 / 11	
Vehicle and Vessel Tax Law	25 February 2011	106 / 15 / 36	2019
Tourism Law	25 April 2013	150 / 0 / 5	2016, 2018
Waterway Law	28 December 2014		2016
Law on the Exploration and Development of Resources in Deep Seabed Areas	26 February 2016	163 / 0 / 1	
Asset Appraisal Law	2 July 2016	138 / 5 / 14	
Cybersecurity Law	7 November 2016	154 / 0 / 1	
Environmental Protection Tax Law	25 December 2016	145 / 1 / 4	2018
Vessel Tonnage Tax Law	27 December 2017	158 / 0 / 0	2018
Tobacco Leaf Tax Law	27 December 2017	156 / 1 / 1	
Law on Farmland Occupation Tax	29 December 2018		
Foreign Investment Law	15 March 2019	2929 / 8 / 8	
Resource Tax Law	26 August 2019	164 / 1 / 2	

== Social laws ==
Laws	Passed	Voting results (Yea / Nay / Abstain)	Amendment(s)
Wild Animal Conservation Law	8 November 1988		2004, 2009, 2016, 2018
Law on the Protection of the Rights and Interests of Returned Overseas Chinese and the Family Members of Overseas Chinese	7 September 1990		2000, 2009
Law on the Protection of Disabled Persons	28 December 1990		2008, 2018
Law on the Protection of Minors	4 September 1991		2006, 2012
Law on the Protection of Women's Rights and Interests	3 April 1992		2005, 2018
Trade Union Law	3 April 1992		2001, 2009
Mine Safety Law	7 November 1992		2009
Law on Red Cross Society	31 October 1993		2009, 2017
Labor Law	5 July 1994		2009, 2018
Law on the Protection of the Rights and Interests of the Elderly	29 August 1996		2009, 2012, 2015, 2018
Law on Prevention of Juvenile Delinquency	28 June 1999		2012
Law on Donations for Public Welfare	28 June 1999		
Law on the Prevention and Control of Occupational Diseases	27 October 2001		2011, 2016, 2017, 2018
Employment Promotion Law	30 August 2007	150 / 1 / 1	2015
Social Insurance Law	28 October 2010		2018
Military Personnel Insurance Law	27 April 2012		
Special Equipment Safety Law	29 June 2013		
Anti-domestic Violence Law	27 December 2015	158 / 0 / 1	
Charity Law	16 March 2016	2636 / 131 / 83	
Law on Administration of Foreign NGOs' Activities within China	28 April 2016	147 / 1 / 1	
Veterans' Protection Law	11 November 2020		
Legal Aid Law	20 August 2021		
Family Education Promotion Law	23 October 2021		
Barrier-free Environment Construction Law	28 June 2023		

== Procedural laws ==
Laws	Passed	Voting results (Yea / Nay / Abstain)	Amendment(s)
Criminal Procedure Law	1 July 1979		1996, 2012, 2018
Decision on the Exercise of Criminal Jurisdiction over Crimes Provided for in International Treaties Concluded Acceded to by the People's Republic of China	23 July 1987		
Administrative Litigation Law	4 April 1989		2014, 2017
Civil Procedure Law	9 April 1991		2007, 2012, 2017, 2021, 2023
Arbitration Law	31 August 1994		2009, 2017
Special Maritime Procedure Law	25 December 1999		
Extradition Law	28 December 2000		
Law on People's Assessors	27 April 2018	169 / 0 / 1	
Labor Dispute Mediation and Arbitration Law	29 December 2007		
Law on the Mediation and Arbitration of Rural Land Contract Disputes	27 June 2009		
People's Mediation Law	28 August 2010	143 / 2 / 7	
International Criminal Judicial Assistance Law	26 October 2018		

== See also ==
- Law of the People's Republic of China
- Chinese law
- Traditional Chinese law
