= Law of the People's Republic of China =

The People's Republic of China has a type of civil law system led by the Chinese Communist Party (CCP). Although it has roots in the Great Qing Code and various historical systems, the current legal system reflects the influence of continental European legal systems, especially the German civil law system in the 19th and early 20th centuries, and socialist law. Hong Kong and Macau, the two special administrative regions, although required to observe the constitution and the basic laws and the power of the National People's Congress, are able to largely maintain their legal systems from colonial times.

Since Mao Zedong's 1949 proclamation of the People's Republic of China, the country does not have judicial independence or judicial review as the courts do not have authority beyond what is granted to them by the National People's Congress under a system of unified state power. The CCP's Central Political and Legal Affairs Commission maintains effective control over the courts and their personnel.

During the Maoist period (1949–1978), the government had a hostile attitude towards a formalized legal system, because CCP chairman Mao Zedong and the CCP "saw the law as creating constraints upon their power." The legal system was attacked as a counter-revolutionary institution, and the concept of law itself was not accepted. Courts were closed, law schools were shut down and lawyers were forced to change professions or be sent to the countryside.

There was an attempt in the mid-1950s to import a socialist legal system based on that of the Soviet Union. But from the start of the Anti-Rightist Campaign in 1957–1959 to the end of the Cultural Revolution around 1976, the PRC lacked most of the features of what could be described as a formal legal system.

This policy was changed in 1979, and new leader Deng Xiaoping and the CCP put into place an "open door" policy, which took on a utilitarian policy to the reconstruction of the social structure and legal system where the law has been used as useful tool to support economic growth. Proposals to create a system of law separate from the CCP were abandoned after the 1989 Tiananmen Square protests and massacre. Under the general secretaryship of Xi Jinping, the legal system has become further subordinated to the CCP.

== History ==
China has a tradition of adopting civil law systems. During the Qing dynasty, the Chinese government hired Japanese legal experts to copy legal systems from Japan in order to modernize the Chinese legal system. This stemmed from the German civil law system. After the establishment of the Republic of China in 1911, the Chinese government maintained the civil law system. Although the CCP abolished all legal systems of the ROC after 1949, its legal system was deeply influenced by the legal system of the Soviet Union, which could also be regarded as a civil law system.

The development of the current legal system dates from the late 1970s, after the end of the Cultural Revolution. During the Reform and Opening Up period, the CCP emphasized the rule of law as a basic strategy and method for state management. At the CCP's 13th National Congress in 1987, former CCP general secretary Zhao Ziyang proposed the idea of a system of law independent of the party. The idea was abandoned with the 1989 Tiananmen Square protests and massacre. In 1997, CCP general secretary Jiang Zemin called for establishing a socialist rule of law at the CCP's 15th National Congress.

On 4 September 1991, China passed the Law of the PRC on Protection of Minors. The law formalised the rights of children under 18 for the first time in China.

In the 2000s, the Weiquan movement began in the PRC, seeking to advance citizens' rights partly by petitioning for enforcement of existing laws, and partly through activism. Lawyers in the movement have seen some court victories, but in other cases they and their families have been ostracized and even tortured for their activities. In 2007, the doctrine of the Three Supremes was introduced under CCP general secretary Hu Jintao, mandating that the judiciary subordinate written law to the interests of the CCP.

On October 27, 2011, the State Council Information Office released the white paper "Socialist Legal System with Chinese Characteristics", announcing that the People's Republic of China has enacted a total of 240 effective laws (including the Constitution), 706 administrative regulations, and more than 8,600 local regulations, and believes that the socialist legal system with Chinese characteristics has been formed.

In 2014, the CCP formally adopted a policy of constructing a "socialist rule of law with Chinese characteristics." CCP general secretary Xi Jinping describes the leadership of the CCP as essential to upholding the socialist rule of law and opposes judicial independence. During the 18th Central Committee of the Chinese Communist Party, the CCP reinforced that the law remains firmly under the party's leadership. Xi states that the two fundamental aspects of the "socialist rule of law with Chinese characteristics" are: (1) that the political and legal organs (including courts, the police, and the procuratorate) must believe in the law and uphold the law and (2) all political and legal officials must follow the CCP. Xi's view tends to equate the rule of law with the development of legislation. In his writings, Xi has emphasized traditional Chinese concepts including people as the root of the state (mingben), "the ideal of no lawsuit" (tianxia wusong), "respecting rite and stressing law" (longli zhongfa), "virtue first, penalty second" (dezhu xingfu), and "promoting virtue and being prudent in punishment" (mingde shenfa).

The primary laws regarding personal data security and privacy are the 2017 Cyber Security Law, the 2021 Data Security Law, and the 2021 Personal Information Protection Law.

In 2019, the city of Hangzhou established a pilot program artificial intelligence-based Internet Court to adjudicate disputes related to ecommerce and internet-related intellectual property claims. Parties appear before the court via videoconference and AI evaluates the evidence presented and applies relevant legal standards.

== Legal system ==
Governmental directives exist in a hierarchy, which is defined by the Legislation Law of the People's Republic of China. The hierarchy of regulations are

1. The Constitution of the People's Republic of China
2. Nationwide laws (全国性法律), which are issued by the National People's Congress
3. Administrative regulations, which are issued by the State Council
4. Local decrees, which are issued by local People's Congresses
5. Administrative and local rules, which are issued by an administrative agency or by a local People's Government

Major areas of law are substantive laws and procedural laws. The former include administrative law, criminal law, civil law or business law, and economic law. These are separated into different branches. For example, contract law is considered a branch of civil law. The latter includes civil procedure law, criminal procedure law and administrative procedure law.

=== Sources of law ===
The highest and ultimate source of legal norms in the country is nominally the state constitution. It establishes the framework and principles of government, and lists the fundamental rights and duties of Chinese citizens. In practice, however, although these "fundamental rights" include "freedom of speech, of the press, of assembly, of association, of procession and of demonstration" the enforcement of these rights and other elements of the Constitution are subject to the discretion of the CCP's leadership. According to China analyst John Dotson, "[w]hile CCP policy documents are always more important than formal PRC law, the Party-state does use formal laws passed by the National People’s Congress to codify and emphasize Party policies."

Unlike some civil law jurisdictions such as Germany, China does not systematically lay down general principles in its constitution which all administrative regulations and rules must follow. The principles of legislation and the validity and priority of law, rule and administrative regulations are instead listed in the Legislation Law, constitutional provisions, basic laws and laws enacted by the National People's Congress and its standing committee, regulations issued by the State Council and its departments, local laws and regulations, autonomous-zone regulations, legal explanations and treaty norms are all in theory incorporated into domestic law immediately upon promulgation.

Unlike common law jurisdictions, there is no strict precedential concept for case law and no principle of stare decisis. In addition, there is no case or controversy requirement that would require the Supreme People's Court to limit its decisions to actual cases, and the SPC does issue general interpretations of the law. In practice, lower people's court judges attempt to follow the interpretations of the laws decided by the Supreme People's Court. In addition, unlike common law jurisdictions, higher courts have the power of supervision and guidance, which means that on their own initiative they can reopen a case that has been decided at a lower level.

Courts in the PRC do not have a general power of judicial review which enables them to strike down legislation. However under the Administrative Procedure Law of the People's Republic of China, they do have authority to invalidate specific acts of the government. In cases where there is a conflict of laws, the process to resolve this conflict is outlined in the Legislation Law of the People's Republic of China, in which an interpretation is requested by the legislative body that is responsible for the law. This process has been criticized both by Western and Chinese legal scholars for being unwieldy and for not allowing for judicial independence and separation of powers.

=== Judiciary ===
The judiciary of the People's Republic of China (PRC) is organized under the principle of unified state power of the National People's Congress (NPC) and is represented by its two primary judicial organs, the Supreme People's Court and the Supreme People's Procuratorate. These organs are constitutionally inferior and accountable to the NPC as the supreme state organ of power, and implement its political will.

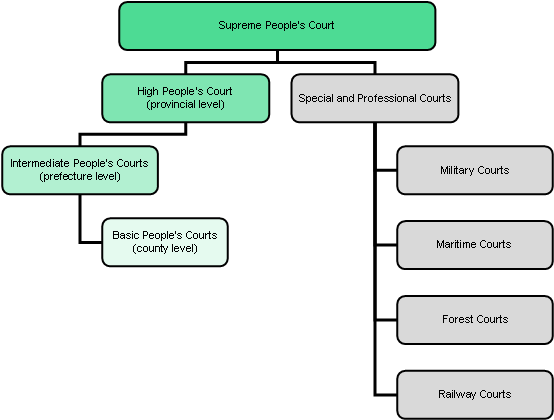
The types of courts in China, and the paths of appeal.

=== Law enforcement ===
Law enforcement in the People's Republic of China is the responsibility of public security agencies, including the People's Police and People's Armed Police in mainland China. Hong Kong and Macau have separate law enforcement agencies, different legal systems, and are classified as separate jurisdictions under the one country, two systems framework. However, the Hong Kong Police Force (HKPF) and Public Security Police Force in Macau often cooperate with the mainland MPS on cases involving cross border crime.

=== Legal profession ===
In the 1980s, law schools in China rapidly expanded and the number of law school graduates began rising. From 1986 to 1992, the number of lawyers in the country more than doubled from 21,500 to 45,000, and by 2008 had reached 143,000.

In the late 1990s and the 2000s, there was a growth in legal advocacy in areas including labor rights, environmental protection, and political matters, often with media campaigns and collective action in conjunction with legal advocacy. Due to the growing sophistication of Chinese laws, the expansion of the rule of law, as well as an influx of foreign law firms, China has also begun to develop a legal-services market. Foreign lawyers have accompanied foreign capital and their clients to China, which has had an immense influence on the promulgation of new Chinese laws based on international norms, especially in regards to intellectual property and corporate and securities law.

Since 2012, new and re-licensing Chinese lawyers are required to pledge a loyalty oath to the CCP:

I swear to faithfully fulfill the sacred mission of legal workers in socialism with Chinese characteristics. I swear my loyalty to the motherland, to the people, to uphold the leadership of the Communist Party of China and the socialist system, and to protect the dignity of the Constitution and laws.

CCP general secretary Xi Jinping encourages legal professionals to selectively incorporate aspects of traditional Chinese law into their modern approaches.

In August 2026, the Standing Committee of the National People's Congress revised the Law on Lawyers, enhancing legal protections for attorneys against interference from state agencies while explicitly mandating loyalty to the CCP.

== Civil law ==
In 1986 the National People's Congress adopted the General Principles of the Civil Law of the People's Republic of China, which helped clarify the scope of the civil law. Article 2 of the document states that the civil law governs personal and property relationships between natural persons and legal persons having equal status. It covers a wide range of topics, including the General Principles, marriage law, property law, contract law, copyright law, and trademark law. From the point of view of some scholars, business law, such as corporation law, bankruptcy law, insurance law, and law on negotiable instruments, is distinguished from civil law.

Until 2021, the PRC did not have a single civil code in force. In its absence, the National People's Congress promulgated Marriage Law, Adoption Law, Succession Law, Contract Law, Law of Rights in Rem, Law of Tort Liability. The first part of the future Civil Code was General Provisions of Civil Law (《民法总则》) adopted in 2017, which was based on General Principles of Civil Law (《民法通则》) adopted in 1986.

On May 28, 2020, the Civil Code of the People's Republic of China was adopted at the third session of the 13th National People's Congress. It came into force on January 1, 2021, on which day Marriage Law, Succession Law, General Principles of Civil Law, Adoption Law, Guarantee Law, Contract Law, Property Law, Tort Law, and General Provisions of Civil Law were repealed. Since the Civil Code of the People's Republic China does not include provisions regarding intellectual property, company, or labour, its promulgation did not affect Trademark Law, Patent Law, Copyright Law, Company Law, Partnership Enterprise Law, Labour Law, or Labour Contract Law, all of which remained in force as of 2021.

=== Civil procedure and evidence ===
The Civil Procedure Law of the People's Republic of China was first adopted in 1991 and subsequently amended in 2007, 2012, 2017 and 2021.

The Civil Procedure Law states that contract disputes shall be "under the jurisdiction of the people's court of the place where the defendant has his domicile or where the contract is performed".

Intellectual property claims involving the internet use a procedure whereby public notaries certify the existence of internet content at a given time. As of at least 2023, blockchain technology is being increasingly used an alternative means of permanently recording a website's content at a specific time. It was first accepted as an alternative to the sometimes impractical or cost-inefficient public notary procedure by the Hangzhou Internet Court.

== Commercial and economic law ==
China's first comprehensive antitrust law was the Anti-Monopoly Law which was passed in 2007 and became effective in 2008.

As a result of a trade war with the United States of America over violations of intellectual property rights of American corporations in the early 1990s, the People's Republic of China's trademark law has been modified and as of 1995 offers significant protections to foreign trademark-owners.

== Criminal law ==
China's first post-1949 substantive and procedural Criminal Code was enacted in 1979. The 1979 Code followed the release of a new Constitution in 1978, and the fall of the Gang of Four in 1976.

The Criminal Law of China (1997) defines numerous corruption-related offenses, the most common of which include: embezzlement, bribery, collective embezzlement, misappropriation, holding huge property with unidentified sources, misuse of authority, dereliction of duty, and fraud.

In 2009, China amended its Criminal Law to set a low threshold for the prosecution of malicious cybercrimes and illegal data sales. The primary laws regarding personal data security and privacy are the 2017 Cyber Security Law, the 2021 Data Security Law, and the 2021 Personal Information Protection Law.

The present Criminal Code, The Criminal Law of the People's Republic of China (中华人民共和国刑法) is the product of extensive revisions, most recently passed on December 26, 2020 (the 11th Amendment to enact on March 1, 2021) which featured changes in response to recent social changes, some notable changes included the lowering of age that bears criminal responsibility to 16, and in the case of "committing crimes of intentional homicide, intentional harm", offenders of 14 to 16 of age would also bear criminal responsibility.

The criminal conviction rate in China is over 99 percent. The harshness of criminal law in China has attracted heavy criticism or strong support, especially due to the insistence on capital punishment for many crimes. China accounts for the biggest number of criminals executed in the world per year, which has raised concerns among different human rights groups and international organizations.

Since 2017, an initiative of the Supreme People's Court and the Ministry of Justice has made free legal counsel available in non-summary trial to almost all criminal defendants.

=== Criminal Procedure Law ===
This Criminal Procedure Law of China (中华人民共和国刑事诉讼法) provides for all phases of the criminal process. This is distinct from the system of administrative punishments (including detention for periods of multiple years) and procedures which are governed under a separate system of laws and regulations. The criminal procedure law governs the conduct of investigations, including pre-trial detention, interrogation, surveillance, prosecution (by an institution called the "procuratorate") and the conduct of trials/the defense of the accused. However, the independence of the courts and institutions involved in the investigation, prosecution and trial of criminal offences in China remains challenged by the structure of the PRC's government and its organs. One example of the structural barriers to the independence of courts is the CCP political-legal committee system, by which "the Party has the power to instruct, monitor or scrutinize courts regarding specific decisions of individual cases or categories of cases that attract attention from the Party."

In 2010, China prohibited admission of illegally obtained evidence in criminal cases.

== Administrative law ==
The State Council is authorized to promulgate administrative regulations, on social and economic sectors and affairs consistent with the laws adopted by the NPC and its Standing Committee. These laws include environmental protection law, regulations on taxation and customs, product quality law, and so on. In these areas, the central government and its organs are superior to other parties, such as enterprises and individuals, for they exercise the power of regulation. Since the early 2000s, environmental lawsuits have been available in China. 2014 amendments to China's Environmental Protection Law permit public interest environmental litigation, including with non-governmental organizations as proper plaintiffs.

In 2015, the Administrative Procedure Law was revised. The 2015 revisions expand the people's rights to sue the government.

Since the early 2000s, environmental lawsuits have been available in China. 2014 amendments to China's Environmental Protection Law permit public interest environmental litigation, including with non-governmental organizations as proper plaintiffs.

== See also ==
- List of statutes of the People's Republic of China
- People's Republic of China's trademark law
- Legal systems of the world
- Socialist law
