= Wilson v. Midway Games, Inc. =

2002 United States federal court case

- Court: United States District Court for the District of Connecticut
- Full case name: Andrea Wilson v. Midway Games, Inc.
- Decided: March 27, 2002
- Citation: No. 3:01CV01017 (D. Conn. Mar. 27, 2002)

Court membership
- Judge sitting: Janet Bond Arterton

Case opinions
- Motion to dismiss granted; case dismissed

Keywords
- video games, First Amendment, product liability, media violence

Wilson v. Midway Games, Inc. was a federal court case in 2002 where Andrea Wilson sued Midway Games, the publisher of the Mortal Kombat video game series, arguing that the game's violent content helped cause her son’s death. Wilson’s claim was based on the idea that Mortal Kombat's design and marketing promoted and encouraged violent behavior in minors, and played a direct role in the fatal stabbing of her son by a friend who allegedly mimicked a character from the game. The court ultimately dismissed the case, holding that video games are protected under the First Amendment and that Mortal Kombat was not considered a “product” subject to liability under Connecticut’s product liability laws. The case is often referred to and cited in legal debates over media violence, First Amendment protections, and whether expressive content can lead to tort liability.

== Background ==
On November 22, 1997, Noah Wilson was fatally stabbed by his friend, Yancy S., with a kitchen knife. According to Wilson, Yancy had become obsessed with Mortal Kombat and he believed he was the Cyrax, one of the characters of the game. One of the moves Cyrax does in the game to finish an opponent/finisher was very similar to what Yancy did to Noah, a neck-grab met with a chest stab. Wilson filed a law suit against Midway Games in federal court, claiming that the game’s violent interactive design and its marketing toward minors led to her son's death.

She brought multiple claims including product liability, negligence and intentional infliction of emotional distress, and violations under Connecticut’s Unfair Trade Practices Act (CUTPA). The main idea was that Mortal Kombat’s immersive and addictive nature made it different from passive forms of media like movies or books.

== Explanation of argument ==
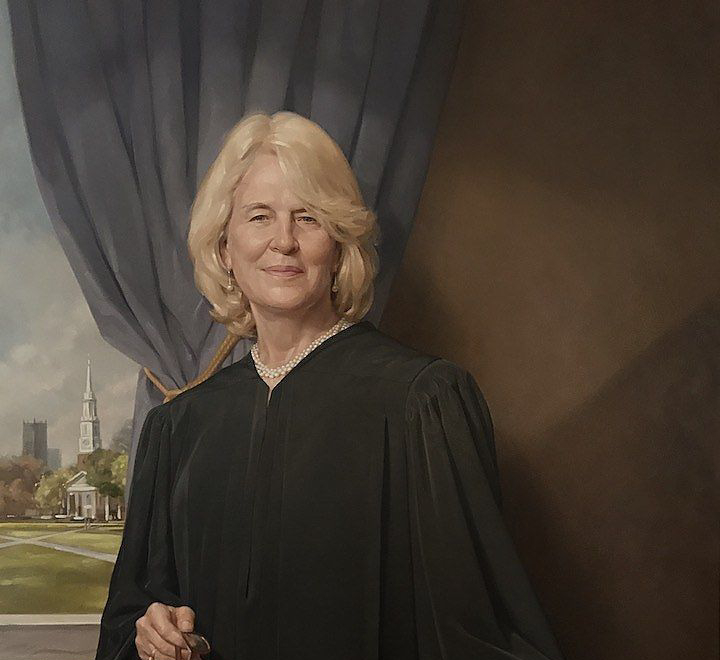
Judge Janet Bond Arterton, who presided over the case.

Wilson’s core legal argument was that Mortal Kombat was a dangerous product because it was designed to promote and reward violent behavior, particularly among young children. She claimed that the game was intentionally engineered to simulate violence in a way that could blur the line between fantasy and reality for susceptible young players. Her complaint emphasized the game's "finishing moves," where characters graphically kill their opponents in stylized gory ways. She asserted that Midway failed to warn users about the game’s “mentally-addictive” nature and potential psychological influence and harm.

From a legal standpoint, Wilson attempted to fit the case within Connecticut’s Product Liability Act (CPLA), arguing that Mortal Kombat was a defective product due to both a failure to warn, and having design flaws. She also claimed Midway engaged in unfair trade practices by marketing the game to minors and sought damages for emotional distress and loss of a loved one.

Midway responded by filing a motion to dismiss under Rule 12(b)(6)"Motion to Dismiss for Failure to State a Claim Upon Which Relief Can Be Granted." Claiming that even if all facts were accepted as true, Wilson failed to state a claim. They argued that video games are expressive works and therefore protected by the First Amendment, and further, that the game did not qualify as a "product" under the CPLA.

== Dissenting opinions / Broader legal debate ==
Although the court dismissed Wilson's case, the lawsuit raised questions about how legal systems should treat media with violent or addictive content. Some legal scholars, like Joseph Reutiman, have challenged the idea that “information” or “expression” should be exempt from product liability, especially as media becomes more interactive and immersive. He argued that the current legal distinction between tangible and intangible products (like books vs. software) is outdated and overly constrained in the face of new technologies.

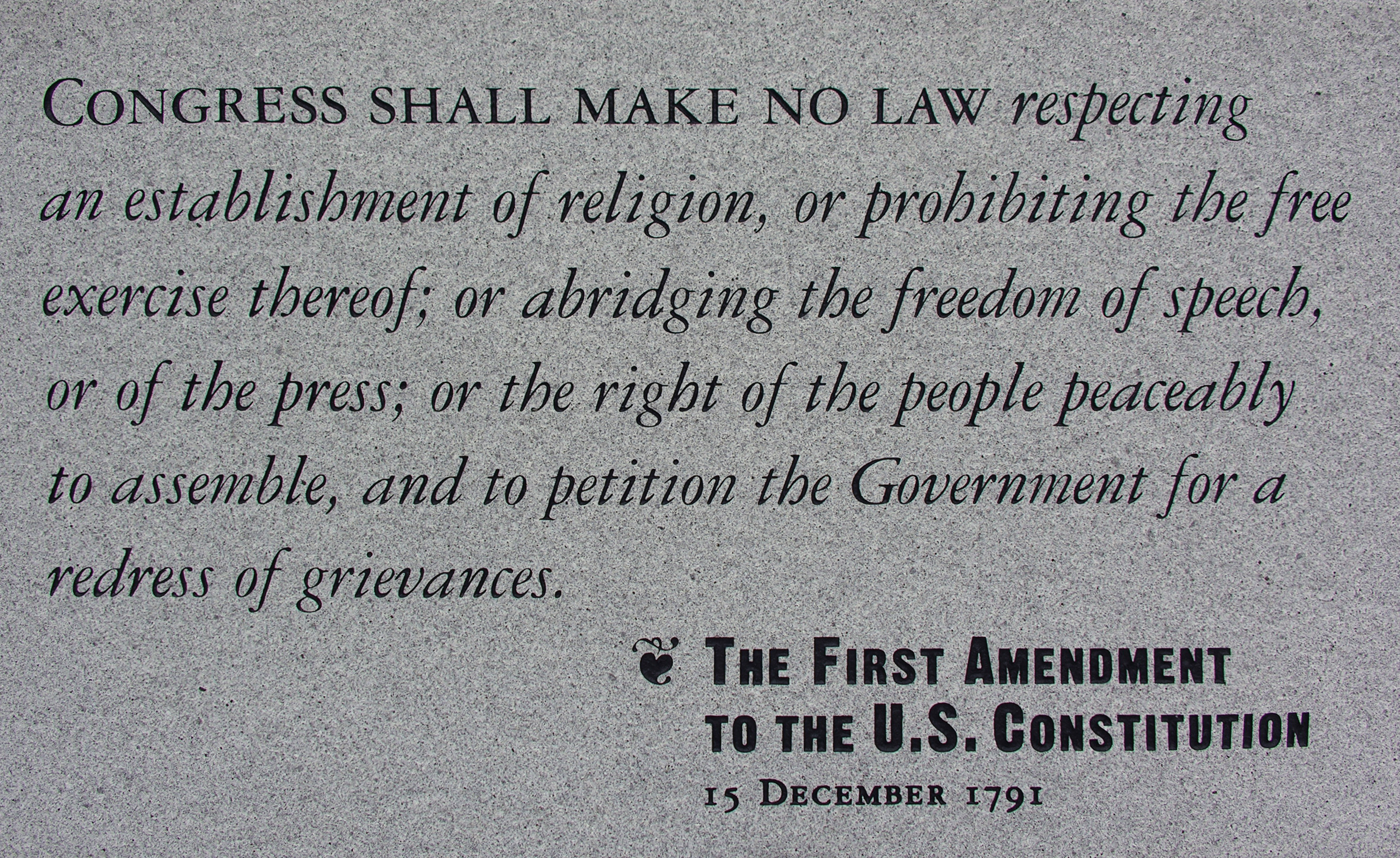
First Amendment monument

Others, like Michael Morley, have pushed back, arguing that granting First Amendment protections to video games even ones that simulate violence is essential, as these games don’t typically meet the legal threshold for expressive conduct that incites real-world action.

Meanwhile, legal writing from Ben West highlighted growing public concerns about video game addiction and speculated whether shifting attitudes might eventually lead courts to reconsider these issues, especially in light of cases like Smallwood v. NCsoft, which involved claims over addiction and emotional distress from online gaming.

== Significance ==
The dismissal of Wilson v. Midway Games, Inc. restarted the legal precedent that video games, like books or films, are protected forms of expression under the First Amendment. It also reinforced the idea that interactive content does not meet the definition of a “product” under traditional product liability frameworks.

This case became part of a larger body of law that protects video game developers from being held liable for violent or criminal behavior said to have been inspired by gameplay. It has been cited in later cases involving media violence and product liability, including James v. Meow Media, Sanders v. Acclaim Entertainment, and Smallwood v. NCsoft.

From a broader perspective, the case represents an early and highly publicized attempt to hold the gaming industry accountable for its content in terms of inciting and influencing the youth to be more violent, a debate that continues today as games become more realistic, immersive and stimulating.
