= Fifth session of the 10th National People's Congress =

2007 National People's Congress; 第十届全国人民代表大会第五次会议; _{5th plenary session of the}; _{10th National People's Congress}; 5 March – 15 March
President	Premier	Congress Chairman
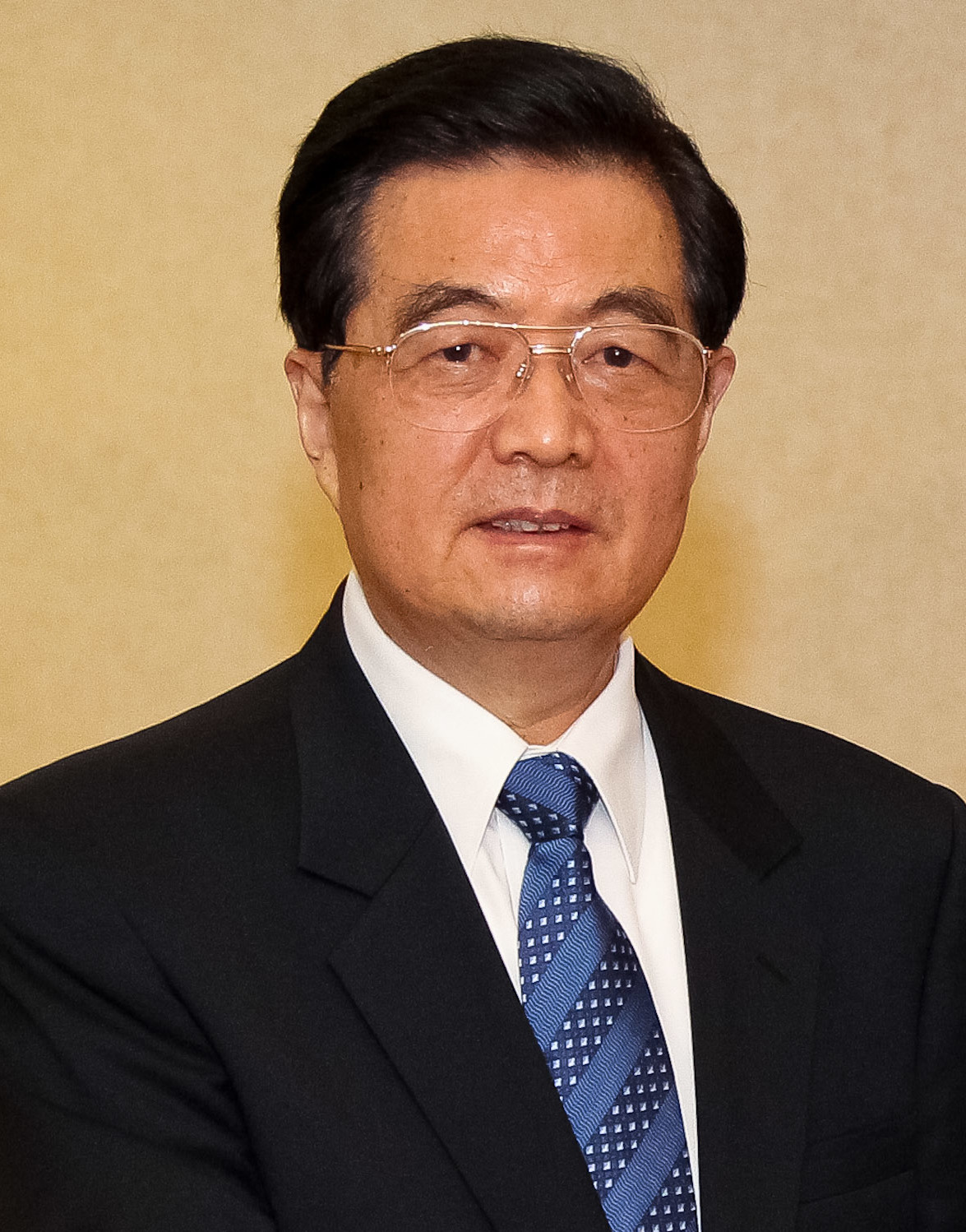
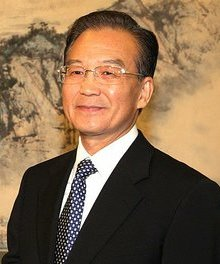
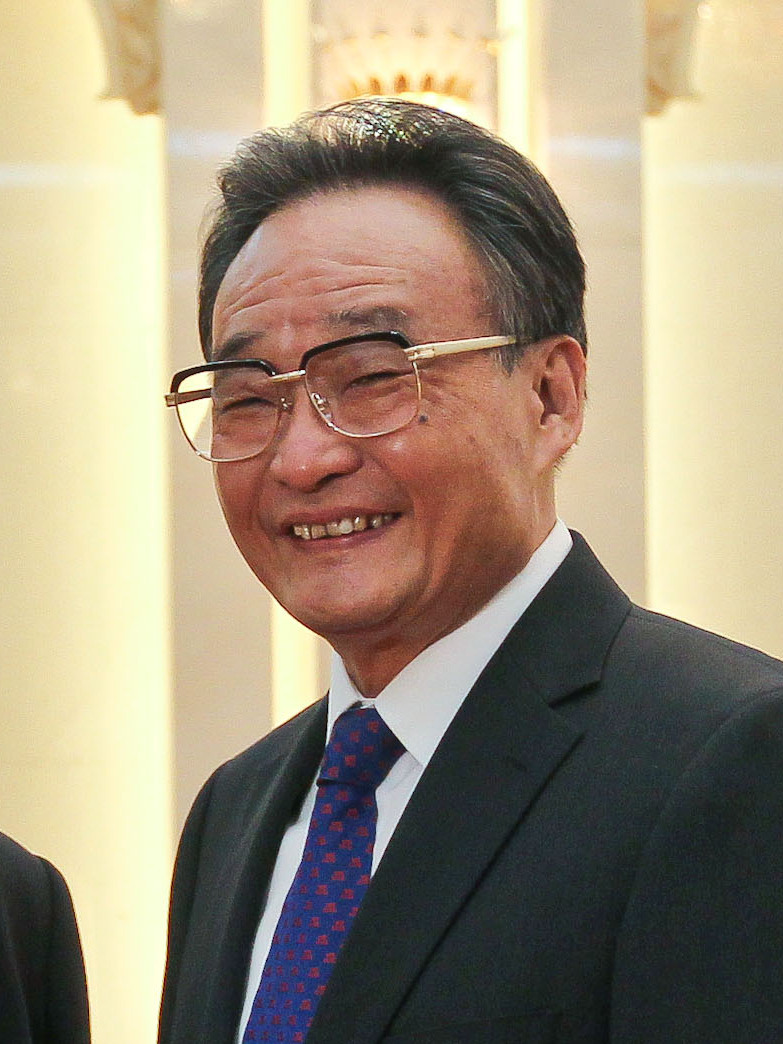
Hu Jintao	Wen Jiabao	Wu Bangguo
since 15 March 2003	since 16 March 2003	since 15 March 2003

The fifth session of the 10th National People's Congress held its annual meeting from March 5 to March 15, 2007 at the Great Hall of the People in Beijing, China, in conjunction with the 2007 Chinese People's Political Consultative Conference. Many items were listed on the agenda for the two-week-long session of the 10th National People's Congress. 2,937 delegates from every province and municipality attended, along with representatives from the People's Liberation Army. Among the delegations were those from the Special Administrative Regions of Hong Kong and Macau and a delegation representing Taiwan. Details on the election of these delegations can be found on the main article on the National People's Congress. The 2007 Session was chaired by Standing Committee Chairman Wu Bangguo, with the annual Government Report delivered by Premier Wen Jiabao. The 2007 Session also set the precedent of allowing foreign journalists to approach and interview any NPC members without restriction. All proposals and resolutions from the session for the first time were fully translated into English. The 2007 NPC formally approved the Property Law of the People's Republic of China which had been under discussion for the last several years. Shanghai party chief Chen Liangyu has been suspended and therefore did not participate in the NPC. However, Vice-Premier Huang Ju, who had been widely speculated in the Hong Kong media and Western sources to have fallen into political disgrace, though reported in the Chinese press as having been in bad health, made an appearance at the opening ceremonies on March 5. Huang genuinely appeared ill.

== The session ==
=== Government report ===
Premier Wen Jiabao delivered the working Government Report for the year 2006, and gave a policy outlook for 2007 during the opening session of the NPC on the morning of March 5, 2007. The speech lasted nearly two hours and fifteen minutes, and focused largely on populist issues such as health care and education, with an unprecedented tone addressing corruption, waste, and environmental concerns. As in previous years, urban-rural and regional disparities were a common theme. Wen opened saying that this is the last year of the 10th National People's Congress, and thus the government's term will legally expire by March 2008. In his 2007 outlook he stressed various issues of general concern of late.

On domestic policy, Wen focused on problematic issues such as real estate, which in recent years has emerged as an infamous sector for illegal dealings and lack of fairness. Wen guaranteed an increase in low-income housing benefits in the coming year, and vowed a serious crackdown on real estate crime.

Premier Wen went on to focus heavily on the Three Rural Issues of agriculture, the countryside, and farmers. This particular topic was echoed throughout the speech. He pledged government finances towards building rural infrastructure and funding towards the development of new technologies. Wen pledged a change in policy towards agricultural insurance, which is almost nonexistent in the current framework. On the topic of rural health care, Wen promised a twofold increase in funding, and vowed that over 80% of the Chinese rural population will receive guaranteed basic health care in the year ahead.

More prominently addressed than in any previous government report were environmental concerns. Wen said that the government will enforce strict environmental standards dictating new construction projects in the coming year. He reinforced the government's position on the protection of land, specifically pointing out that "mansions, golf courses, and lavish government buildings" are not appropriate uses for agricultural land, and cautioned local government and contractors that such things should be avoided.

Wen briefly mentioned the balance being sought by the government between the primary, secondary, and tertiary industries. He stressed the importance of the continued development of the services sector, and the transformation in industry from being simply "large", to becoming "strong".

Another prominent topic of the speech focused on balancing regional disparities. In this area Wen mentioned education as a primary concern. He pledged that in 2007 the central government will completely abolish tuition for rural children (including fees for books and for extracurricular activities) from Kindergarten to Grade 9. Wen also mentioned a fivefold increase in the amount of funding being put towards vocational and post-secondary scholarships, focusing on rural areas. He cited the government's continued focus on training more teachers and educational professionals and increasing the quality of post-secondary education in China, and offered a vision stating "One day, let teachers become the most respected professionals in society".

Wen also pointed out the government's readied stance towards public epidemics and a continued focus towards AIDS prevention. Wen briefly mentioned the government's continued support towards the development of traditional Chinese medicine and its important role in health care. He stressed upgraded and more effective urban health care, especially in central and western regions.

As in previous years, Wen mentioned the government's continued support of the One-child Policy and government benefits for rural families who have difficulties because of the policy. He pledged that local governments and institutions should continue to focus on the teaching of the socialist disgrace and honours system coined by President Hu Jintao. He stressed the importance of so-called "cultural reforms", and said the government would continue building literacy and cultural institutions in rural areas. Wen talked about the government's plans to continue building basic sports facilities, and continue preparation work for the 2008 Beijing Olympics and Shanghai's Expo 2010.

In the area of social welfare, Wen pledged a continued evolution towards an effective social insurance system. To tackle urban unemployment, Wen mentioned the "lowest barrier" where the government will step in and cover basic living costs of victims of job loss. Wen vowed continued vigilance in the matter of safety standards, especially in coal mines, and pledged a tough stance towards commercial scams and fake medicines. Wen also said the local and central governments will continue to be united against organized crime.

Wen talked extensively about the solid government stance on continued reform and opening up. State-owned enterprises will continue their reforms and non-profitable and outdated SOE's will continue to be shut down or replaced by "non-public" institutions. Wen noted the danger of monopolies, and put forth a proposal for a new set of corporate taxation laws aimed at curbing widespread tax evasion and commercial irregularities. Public banking will continue its extension into rural areas. The Agricultural Bank of China will continue its reforms as a listed company. Wen noted that reforms in the insurance sector are to take place before it earns an appropriate place in the services sector.

Concerning international trade, Premier Wen focused on attracting foreign investment, specifically to western and northeastern areas who have "just as much developmental potential" as the affluent coast.

In contrast to previous years, Wen extensively outlined governmental flaws, and the urgent need to reform certain governing institutions. The ideas revolved around the premise of "governing for the people, with transparency from government and participation from the people". Wen acknowledged the serious nature and extent of corruption. The Commissions for Discipline Inspection as well as the masses, Wen said, should rally together in combating official corruption. Wen's vision was to make the governmental system "clean, effective, satisfactory, and transparent" in the coming years. He briefly touched on reforming governmental structure, but did not go into specifics. A clear emphasis was drawn from Wen's comments about governmental waste, which "as noted by our people has become a very severe problem". Wen vowed decreases in governmental spending, and warned staunchly against the lavish lifestyles of public officials.

Military affairs were summed up by the slogan "strategic thinking". Wen pledged to continue building the military to modern standards and stated that China will continue to adhere to the One Country, Two Systems policy and will not violate the high degree of autonomy in Hong Kong and Macau. Reminiscent of previous years, the longest period of applause came when he declared that China will remain resolutely opposed to any form of Taiwan's declaration of de jure "independence." Wen said that the Three Links and economic integration must continue, and welcomes dialogue from any Taiwanese political party.

On foreign policy, Wen stated that China will continue in its role in the development of a peaceful and harmonious world.

The conclusion of the speech made mention of President Hu Jintao's new Scientific Development Perspectives and the goal of a Socialist Harmonious Society.

=== Property Law ===
On March 8, the Property Law of the People's Republic of China was formally introduced at the NPC. Vice-Chairman Wang Zhaoguo told the Congress that the law will "safeguard the fundamental interests of the people", and the law is an attempt at adapting to new "economic and social realities" in China. The bill was first published in 2002. It was subsequently deferred, failed again in its reading at the 2006 National People's Congress because of a dispute over its contents, and then went through its eighth reading in 2007.

Some press reports have characterized this law as the first piece of legislation in the People's Republic of China to cover an individual's right to own private assets, although this is incorrect, as the right to private property was written into the PRC Constitution in 2003, and the law itself is directed at defining all forms of property in the PRC.

The law was adopted on March 16, the final day of the two-week session of parliament, with the backing of 96.9% of the 2,889 legislators attending, with 2799 for, 52 against, and 37 abstentions. With his final address to the 2007 Session, NPC Chairman Wu Bangguo declared "the Private Property Law and the Corporate Taxation Law are two of the most important laws in the new economic system of Socialism with Chinese characteristics; we must attempt to learn these laws fully through various methods."

=== Corporate Tax Law ===
The other major economic law that was passed unified the tax rates of foreign and domestic corporations at 25%.

=== Other significant events ===
A letter was sent from people who were victims of Mao's Anti-Rightist Movement to the Congress, asking for compensation.

Lawmakers also banned Internet cafe usage by minors, a large number of whom are allegedly addicted.

Delegate Jian Deming put forth a proposal for a "dog tax", a deterrent for pet owners, in an apparent attempt to curb the ongoing spread of rabies.

=== Premier's press conference ===
Chinese leaders rarely give interviews or hold open press conferences, and their appearances, regardless of circumstance, are usually heavily scripted. One of the few times open press conferences are held is immediately following the National People's Congress session every year.

In 2007, Premier Wen Jiabao had to answer a series of sensitive questions involving China's increased military spending, the road to democracy, the Dalai Lama, and even a question about disgraced former Premier Zhao Ziyang. (Note: Wen was careful not to mention Zhao's name directly, and although the press conference was carried out live on national television, the question was censored in the transcript subsequently displayed on the internet.) When answering a question from a reporter from The Wall Street Journal, Wen said China would like to reduce its trade surplus, but reassured the United States that the current trade imbalance will not destabilize U.S. currency values. Wen recognized the systematic problems facing the Chinese economic system. Wen reiterated the official stance that China is opposed to the weaponization of space, and that the Chinese military build-up is purely for domestic rather than for offensive purposes. On the issue of the Dalai Lama, Wen said China's government is open to dialogue with the 14th Dalai Lama as long as he gives up efforts for Tibetan independence. In reply to a question about democracy from a French reporter, Wen reiterated the age-old CCP maxim that "different states have different backgrounds, therefore democracy must be achieved based on different timelines". Wen did concede, however, that more democracy is required in the current system to combat rising corruption.

On the subject of Taiwan independence, the tone maintained the harsh rhetoric against the current administration on the island led by Chen Shui-bian while attempting not to alienate the Taiwanese electorate in general. During the two-week session, Wen was careful to add the words "de jure independence" (法理独立) as opposed to simply "independence" when referring to Taiwan. During the Press Conference, Wen also reiterated that the PRC government was in favour of perfecting the Three Links, amongst other economic and cultural ties.

In an unprecedented move, Wen began the press conference with a direct appeal to the people by reading a letter from a primary school student, subsequently voicing his concern about China's current social imbalance.

=== Media response ===
- China Daily, an English newspaper based in China, ran the headlines "Premier vows to support education".
- The Daily Telegraph called Wen's speech an "unusually populist" move which attacked corrupt officials and focused on health and education.
- Bloomberg L.P.'s Andy Mukherjee commented that "Chinese Premier Wen Jiabao's speech at this year's meeting of the country's largely symbolic legislature broke little new ground."

== Voting results ==
=== Resolutions ===
Topic		For	Against	Abstain	Rate
Premier Wen Jiabao's Government Work Report		2,826	30	30	97.92%
Property Law		2,799	52	37	96.92%
Enterprise Income Tax Law		2,826	37	22	97.95%
Report on the Implementation of the 2006 National Economic and Social Development Plan and the 2007 Draft Plan		2,757	76	56	95.43%
Report on the Execution of the Central and Local Budgets for 2006 and on the Draft Central and Local Budgets for 2007		2,532	220	131	87.83%
Drafts of electing delegates for the next term	All	2,792	47	41	97.62%
Drafts of electing delegates for the next term	Hong Kong	2,838	17	27	98.47%
Drafts of electing delegates for the next term	Macau	2,852	18	16	98.96%
Chairman Wu Bangguo's NPCSC Work Report		2,826	30	30	97.92%
Chief Justice Wang Shengjun's Supreme People's Court Work Report		2,395	359	127	83.13%
Procurator-General Jia Chunwang's Supreme People's Procuratorate Work Report		2,414	342	128	83.70%

== See also ==
- History of the People's Republic of China (2002-present)
- National People's Congress

== Notes ==
Preceded by 2006 NPC	Annual National People's Congress Sessions of the People's Republic of China; March 5—15, 2007	Succeeded by 2008 NPC
