= Civil Code of the People's Republic of China =

Civil code effective 1 January 2021

The Civil Code of the People's Republic of China

National People's Congress
- Citation: Civil Code of the People's Republic of China (Official English Translation)
- Territorial extent: People's Republic of China but excludes China's Special Administrative Regions.
- Enacted by: 13th National People's Congress
- Enacted: 28 May 2020
- Commenced: January 1, 2021

Related legislation
- Property Law of the People's Republic of China

Summary
- A law formulated in accordance with the Constitution of the People’s Republic of China for the purposes of protecting the lawful rights and interests of the persons of the civil law, regulating civil-law relations, maintaining social and economic order, meeting the needs for developing socialism with Chinese characteristics, and carrying forward core socialist values.

Keywords
- Civil code, Torts, Civil law
- Status: In force

The Civil Code of the People's Republic of China (Chinese: 中华人民共和国民法典; pinyin: Zhōnghuá Rénmín Gònghéguó Mínfǎ Diǎn) is the first complete civil code in the People's Republic of China. Effective January 1, 2021, the introduction of the civil code is the first time a unified civil law framework has been created to integrate most of the former substantial civil substantive laws in China.

== Contents ==
The Code consists of 1260 Articles, which are respectively in seven books and the book of supplementary provisions.

- Book 1 - General Provisions: Basic rules, natural and legal persons, unincorporated organizations, civil rights, private juridical acts, agency, civil liability, limitation periods, prescription;
- Book 2 - Property rights: general rules, creation, modification, transfer, extinction, ownership, usufruct, security interests, possession, servitudes;
- Book 3 - Contracts: General rules, typical contracts, quasi-contracts;
- Book 4 - Personality rights: General regulations, rights to life, bodily integrity, and health, right to a name (姓名权、名称权), portrait rights (publicity rights), rights of reputation and honor, privacy rights and personal information protection;
- Book 5 - Family relations: General rules, marriage, divorce, adoption, legal guardianship;
- Book 6 - Inheritance: General rules, intestate and testate inheritance, testamentary gifts (legacies), executorship and administration of an estate;
- Book 7 - Tort liability: General rules, damages, fault liability, product liability, motor vehicle accident liability, medical damages, environmental pollution and ecological damages; and,
- Supplementary provisions.

== Adoption ==
The Code consists of seven books and a supplementary provision. The first book of the code, also known as the General Provisions, was adopted on March 15, 2017, by National People's Congress, and took into effect on October 1, 2017, implementing and replacing a large part of the former General Principles of the Civil Law (1986). On August 27, 2018, the draft of other books of the Code was submitted to the fifth meeting of the Standing Committee of the 13th National People's Congress for its first reading. On May 28, 2020, the third session of the 13th National People's Congress voted to adopt the Civil Code.

In accordance of Article 1260 of the Code, several laws are repealed by the new code: the Marriage Law; the Inheritance Law; the General Principles of the Civil Law; the Adoption Law; the Guarantee Law; the Contract Law; the Property Law; the Tort Liability Law; and the General Provisions of the Civil Law.

Also, the Interpretation of the Standing Committee of the National People's Congress on Paragraph 1 of Article 99 of the General Principles of the Civil Law of the People's Republic of China and Article 22 of the Marriage Law of the People's Republic of China was also deprecated on the day when the Code come into force.

== Legislative process ==
The legal system of the People's Republic of China is based on the older European legal system of Germanic civil law however the process of formulating the civil code has been full of twists and turns. As early as 1954, after the promulgation of the first constitution of the People's Republic of China, the then government of the People's Republic of China immediately initiated a legislative project, namely the drafting of the Civil Code of the People's Republic of China. However, the drafting of the "Civil Code of the People's Republic of China" has experienced four consecutive delays due to the subsequent anti-rightist movement and the Cultural Revolution. Until the "General Principles of the Civil Law of the People's Republic of China (Draft)" passed at the Fourth Session of the Sixth National People's Congress on April 12, 1986, it marked the formal establishment of the first basic civil law of the People's Republic of China with the nature of general principles of civil law. Although there was still promotion afterwards, they were all formulated and implemented in the form of separate laws. It was not until the appearance of the "General Principles of the Civil Code of the People's Republic of China (Draft)" passed in 2017, and the appearance of the various chapters of the Civil Code began to be compiled in 2018 that the "Civil Code of the People's Republic of China" was officially Introduced. On May 28, 2020, the Standing Committee of the 13th National People's Congress voted to pass the "Civil Code of the People's Republic of China", scheduled to take effect on January 1, 2021.

=== First draft ===
The first drafting team of the Civil Code was set up in the research room of the General Office of the Standing Committee of the National People's Congress, and was responsible for studying the drafting of the Civil Code. In the process of studying and drafting the Civil Code, the General Office of the Standing Committee of the National People's Congress did a lot of preparatory work. December 1956, the first People's Republic of China, "Civil Code draft" shape, the first draft of a total of more than 400 pieces, "General, ownership, debt, inheritance" four; then to 1922 " Russian Civil Code " as Basically, it excludes relatives from the Civil Code, does not stipulate property rights, and replaces the concept of natural person with the concept of citizenship . In 1957, the rectification movement and the anti-rightist movement began. On August 21, 1958, Chairman Mao Zedong of the CPC Central Committee stated at the enlarged meeting of the Political Bureau of the CPC Central Committee in Beidaihe that civil and criminal laws would no longer be enacted; on December 20 of the same year, the Central Political and Legal Affairs Commission stated in a report to the CPC Central Committee that there was no need to enact a civil law.

=== Second draft ===
In 1962, Mao Zedong addressed the issue of adjustment and improvement in the national economy, and proposed that "no law is not enough, criminal law and civil law must be developed. Not only must laws be formulated, but also cases must be compiled", so the drafting of the civil code was once again placed on the agenda. In accordance with this instruction, in September of the same year, the Standing Committee of the National People's Congress established a “Civil Law Research Group” headed by the Deputy Chairman and Deputy Secretary-General of the Standing Committee of the National People's Congress and the Director of the Law Institute of the Chinese Academy of Social Sciences. Under the auspices of the Law Office of the General Office of the Standing Committee of the National People's Congress, the drafting of the second civil code began. In the second half of 1964, the "Draft of the Civil Law (Trial Draft)" was completed and printed in a volume; this draft consisted of three parts: "General Provisions", "Property ownership", and "Property transfer", and a total of 24 chapters and 262 articles. Due to the nature of the central economic planning during, socialist education movement and the Cultural Revolution drafting of the Civil Code once again interrupted from 1965 to 1976.

=== Third draft ===
With the end of the Cultural Revolution and the commencement of the redress of unjust, false and wrong cases, the political situation in the People's Republic of China stabilized, putting the drafting of the Civil Code on the agenda once again. The Legislative Affairs Committee of the Standing Committee of the National People's Congress established the Civil Code Drafting Group in November 1979, and began the third draft of the Civil Code.

In August 1980, the Civil Code Drafting Group drafted a "trial draft" of the civil law draft, and began to solicit opinions from some economic units and political and legal departments. This draft consisted of 6 parts and 501 articles on general provisions, property ownership, contracts, labor remuneration and rewards, liability for damages, and inheritance of property. In September, the original " Marriage Law of the People's Republic of China " was revised to adapt to the new situation since the reform and opening up. However, since the reform and opening up of the People's Republic of China and the construction of economic recovery had just started at that time, the conditions for drafting a complete civil code were not mature enough in the short term, therefore the civil law was temporarily established and implemented as a separate law.

From 1985, oniwards the "Inheritance Law of the People's Republic of China", the "General Principles of the Civil Law of the People's Republic of China", the "Civil Procedure Law of the People's Republic of China" and "Adoption Law of the People's Republic of China", were established and implemented successfully.

=== Fourth draft ===
January 13, 1998, the Eighth Standing Committee of the National People's Congress Vice Chairman Wang Hanbin invited five civil law professors discuss the draft code (respectively: Jiang Ping from China University of Political Science, Wang Jiafu and Professor Liang from the CASS Institute of Law, Wang Baoshu from Tsinghua University and Wang Liming from Renmin University of China), the five experts agreed that the conditions for drafting the civil code were already met; Wang Hanbin suggested the resumption of the drafting of the civil code and commissioned nine scholars and experts to form a "Civil Law Drafting Working Group" (Jiang Ping, Wang Jiafu, Wei Zhenying) Wang Baoshu, Professor Liang, Wang Liming, Xiao Xun, Wei Yaorong), responsible for co-ordination of the draft civil code drafting. In March 1998, the first meeting of the Civil Law Drafting Working Group decided to "go in three steps": first determine the "Contract Law of the People's Republic of China" to establish the order and unity of the socialist market economy; secondly formulate the Property Law in 4–5 years time to establish complete rules the basic rules of property ownership then finally, based on the improvement of the credit property rights system, formulate the Civil Code before 2010.

In 2001, based on China's accession to the World Trade Organization and the requirements of the legal environment under the circumstances, Li Peng, Chairman of the Standing Committee of the Ninth National People's Congress, requested that the draft of the Civil Code be completed in 2002 and to be reviewed by the Standing Committee. The Standing Committee of the Ninth National People's Congress organized the drafting of the "Civil Law of the People's Republic of China (Draft)", and a civil code drafting meeting was held on January 11, 2002. Six experts and scholars were entrusted by Hu Kangsheng, deputy director of the Legal Affairs Commission to the draft articles of each chapter of the Civil Code (Liang Huixing is responsible for drafting the General Clause, Creditor's Rights and Contracts; Wang Liming as responsible for the Personality Rights and Tortious Acts; Zheng Chengsi as responsible for intellectual property rights; Tang Dehua for the civil liability; Wu Changzhen, for drafting Family members and inheritance members and Fei Zongqi as responsible for drafting the applicable laws for foreign-related civil relations). From April 16 to April 19, 2002, the Legal Affairs Working Committee held an expert discussion meeting on the draft of the Civil Code, and on the morning of the 19th focused on discussing the structure of the Civil Code, most of which were unanimously agreed. However, no agreement was reached on whether to establish personality rights and intellectual property rights (Liang Huixing did not approve of the establishment of personality rights and intellectual property rights; Zheng Chengsi did not approve of the establishment of intellectual property rights). Later, due to the fact that there were too many provisions in the draft, it was inconvenient to review them together, so the practice of splitting and reviewing by separate civil law methods was maintained.

=== Fifth and final draft ===
Draft of the Personal Rights of the Civil Code of May 19, 2020: Promoting the Protection of Personal Rights in China China News Agency interviewed Zang Tiewei, spokesperson of the Legal Work Committee of the Standing Committee of the National People's Congress on hot issues related to the Civil Code

With the basic maturity of the People's Republic of China's concept of governing the country by law, the drafting and codification of the Civil Code has reopened. On October 23, 2014, the fourth plenary session of the Eighteenth Central Committee of the Chinese Communist Party passed the "Decision of the Central Committee of the Communist Party of China on Several Major Issues of Comprehensively Promoting the Rule of Law", which clearly stated that the civil code should be "edited". In March 2015, the Legislative Affairs Committee of the Standing Committee of the National People's Congress took the lead in establishing a coordination group for the compilation of the Civil Code, which was attended by the Supreme People's Court, the Supreme People's Procuratorate, the Legislative Affairs Office of the State Council, the Chinese Academy of Social Sciences, and the Chinese Law Society. The working class carried out the compilation of the civil code.

Starting from March 2016, in accordance with the plan of the National People's Congress and its Standing Committee, the drafting and codification of the Civil Code adopts the plan of first compiling the general provisions of the Civil Code, then compiling the sub-editing of the Civil Code, and finally integrating into the Civil Code of the People's Republic of China. Be gradually implemented. On June 27 of the same year, the draft of the General Provisions of the Civil Code was submitted to the Standing Committee of the National People's Congress for the first deliberation. During the period from July 5 to August 4, 2016, the preliminary draft of the draft general provisions of the civil law was published on the China National People's Congress website and publicly solicited opinions from the public. On October 31 of the same year, the draft of the General Provisions of the Civil Code was submitted to the Standing Committee of the National People's Congress for a second review. During the period from November 18 to December 17, 2016, the second deliberation draft of the General Provisions of the Civil Law was published on the China National People's Congress website and publicly solicited opinions from the public. On December 19 of the same year, the draft of the General Provisions of the Civil Code was submitted to the Standing Committee of the National People's Congress for three deliberation. During the period from December 27, 2016, to January 26, 2017, the three deliberation drafts of the draft general provisions of the civil law were published on the China National People's Congress website and publicly solicited opinions from the public. On March 8, 2017, the draft of the General Provisions of the Civil Code was submitted to the Fifth Session of the Twelfth National People's Congress for deliberation. On March 15, the draft of the general provisions of the Civil Code was passed through the closing ceremony of the Fifth Session of the Twelfth National People's Congress to form a law. On October 1, the "General Principles of the Civil Law of the People's Republic of China", the General Principles of the Civil Code, came into effect.

After the completion of the general provisions of the Civil Code, the drafts of the various divisions of the Civil Code were submitted to the Standing Committee of the National People's Congress for the first review on August 27, 2018. During the initial deliberation, there was a discussion on whether to increase the personality rights, intellectual property rights, and the legal application of foreign-related civil relations. After the discussion, it was decided to increase the personality rights. Since then, the various divisions of the Civil Code (including the draft of property rights, the draft contract, the draft of personality rights, the draft of marriage and family and the draft of inheritance, tort liability The draft) was reviewed separately.

The "Civil Code of the People's Republic of China (Draft)", which is composed of the General Principles of the Civil Code and its divisions, is reviewed by the Standing Committee of the National People's Congress and passed by a vote at the 2020 National People's Congress.

== See also ==
- Civil law
- Civil code
- Law of the People's Republic of China
- Constitution of China
