= Dispatched labor =

Type of employment relationship

Dispatched labor refers to an atypical employment relationship. Dispatch work agencies receive requests from businesses to have them hire and manage labor on the business' behalf. This type of labor is known as "dispatched labor". There is in fact no direct contract between dispatched laborers and the enterprise which uses the agency's services, so in this way, dispatched employment follows a triangle structure. As dispatch agencies are often highly adept in hiring and managing workforces, businesses are more than happy to use an agency to manage part of their workforce as it saves time, money, and in case of foreign enterprise, the hassle of quickly understanding the legal workings of a local labor force.

== History ==
=== 1920s to 1940s - Initial germinating stages ===
The earliest labor dispatching came out in London, UK before World War I, but the form of labor dispatch at that time was different from nowadays. In addition to labor dispatching, it also contained the job of private placement agencies. The initial development of labor dispatch originated from the 1920s. Samuel Workman created the idea of "rented help". Samuel hired began by hiring married women to make inventory at night in order to meet temporary or short-term demand of enterprises at that time.

=== 1940s to 1980s - Growth stage ===
At this time, labor dispatching was popularized in America, Japan and all over Europe. The most important and common labor dispatching in America was founded in 1946 to 1951. For example, the biggest dispatched work agency at present, Manpower, was founded in 1948.

According to statistics from NAPEO, the growth of labor dispatching in the US keeps to roughly 20% per year. In the late 1940s and early 1950s, Belgium, France, UK, the Netherlands, Norway and America already had the service of labor dispatching, and most well-established dispatched work agencies were founded at during this period. In Japan, labor dispatching emerged in 1965. Employers of dispatched work agencies already hired or registered a certain amount of laborers and dispatched them to the users enterprise to provide labor services when the enterprise was in demand. At that time, labor dispatching played as matchmaker between females, older workers and dispatched work agencies. After 1975, due to the rising demand of many enterprises, dispatched work agencies grew rapidly.

=== 1980s to 1990s - Stable stage ===
In 1980s, labor dispatching starting blossoming and developing in America, partly due to a high post-war employment rate. The labor market of America also faced a structural change. With the rapid development and the stability of social environment, enterprises started to pursue the goal of maximum profits and minimum costs. At the same time, enterprises also started to pursue a labor force that can adopt quickly to market variations. Enterprises attached more importance to the flexibility of human resource utilization. Japan made the law of labor dispatching for the first time in July, 1985. The Ministry of Labor started to formulate a chain of detailed bylaws and executive orders, and entered the era of legal labor dispatching in 1, July, 1986.

=== 1990s to nowadays - Rapid growth stage ===
According to the labors of personnel supply services research conducted in 1996, almost 9 out of 10 laborers were hired by dispatched work agencies. In addition, according to the statistics of America Staffing Association, 90% of American enterprises used the services provided from labor dispatching industry. This illustrated how ingrained the concept of labor dispatching had become in American society. In Japan, since making the law of labor dispatching in 1985, labor dispatching developed rapidly, leading to the development of 615 general dispatched work agencies, 3,266 specific dispatched work agencies, and 1.4 billion dispatched laborers.

As of 1998, there were 3026 general dispatched work agencies, 6985 specific dispatched work agencies, and 9 billion dispatched labors. In a short span of 12 years, the population of dispatched labor has grown six times, and it still kept increasing. Especially after the law of labor dispatching in Japan changed for the 4th time. In the 90s, EU labor dispatching was the fastest growing employment form in all of the atypical employment networks. Among most member states, the population of dispatched labor forces multiplied in growth. The ILO went on to approve the Convention Concerning Private Employment Agencies (NO. 181), which had two key corrections: First, corrected the Convention Concerning Fee-Charging Employment Agencies (NO. 96). The activities of private employment agencies were not confined to placement services and job placement anymore but the employer could provide laborers to third parties. Second, urged the international society members to attach importance on the flexibility of labor market. Because of the legislation of ILO Convention 181, it spurred big progress in the development of labor dispatching.

== Dispatched Labor by Country ==
=== Japan ===
==== Regularly employed ====
Dispatched work agencies send their regular employed workers to client enterprises to provide labor. The labor contracts between dispatched workers and dispatched work agencies are irregular labor contracts, thus, whether the period of dispatched contracts expire or not, it will not influence the labor relation between dispatched workers and dispatched work agencies. As long as the relationship between dispatched workers and dispatched work agencies exists, whether dispatched workers engage in dispatched jobs or not, dispatched work agencies still have to pay wages to dispatched workers.

==== Registered ====
There is no irregular labor relationship between dispatched work agencies and dispatched workers. Dispatched workers merely go to dispatched work agencies to register. Only when client enterprises ask dispatched work agencies for human resources and the demand meets dispatched workers' conditions, do dispatched work agencies sign labor contracts with dispatched workers. The period of a labor contract is usually the same as with dispatched contracts, so when the dispatched contracts expire, the labor contracts do, too. Dispatched workers will go back to the status of registered.

=== Germany ===
(1) Non-profit labor dispatched: Employees works for their employers, but at some special situations, employers lend them to the third one. Employers need employees to work for them for a long term, and they don't use employers to get profit, so they only dispatch workers to other enterprises temporarily; therefore, this kind dispatched workers' wages are better than who are in dispatched work agencies. As a result, there is no any specific law to regulate non-profit labor dispatched.

(2) Profit labor dispatched: This is the same as "regularly employed type" in Japan; however, there is no "register-type" in Germany. About profit labor dispatched, Germany passed and executed Arbeitnehmerüberlassungsgesetz in 1972, and it included detailed contents to regulate this kind of dispatched work.

=== China ===
On 28 December 2012, the Standing Committee of the National People's Congress passed an amendment to the Labor Contract Law in China. The changes have come into force from 1st July 2013 and mainly found to affect the machinery of labor dispatch. The Amendment increases the registration requirements for labor dispatch agencies, improves how dispatched employees are remunerated, clarifies the scope of eligible positions and assigns liabilities to host employers. Labor dispatch is highly relied upon in China to staff companies, both domestic and foreign invested. Under a typical labor dispatch arrangement, a dispatch agency enters into an employment contract with an employee and then enters into a dispatch agreement with a host employer, pursuant to which the employee is dispatched to the host employer. Under this scheme, the dispatch agency, instead of the host employer, assumes all obligations and liabilities of an employer, such as paying social security contributions and severance for the employees.

There have been debates and criticism on the usage of labor dispatch because of its tendency to make it easier for employers to evade liabilities, and thus dispatched employees often have less protection than the regular employees. When promulgated in 2007, the Labor Contract Law compromised on this issue by intentionally leaving certain provisions ambiguous and general. As a result, the use of labor dispatch has continued to grow even after the law was introduced. The purpose of the Amendment is to tighten the rules on labor dispatch.

== See also ==
- Contingent work
