= Law on Penalties for Administration of Public Security =

Law of China

Law of the People's Republic of China on Penalties for Administration of Public Security

Standing Committee of the National People's Congress
- Passed by: Standing Committee of the National People's Congress
- Passed: 28 August 2005
- Signed by: President Hu Jintao
- Signed: 28 August 2005
- Commenced: 1 March 2006

Legislative history
- Introduced by: State Council of China
- First reading: October 22–27, 2004
- Second reading: June 26–July 1, 2005
- Third reading: August 23–28, 2005

Amends
- 2012, 2025
- Status: In force

Law on Penalties for Administration of Public Security
- Simplified Chinese: 中华人民共和国治安管理处罚法
- Traditional Chinese: 中華人民共和國治安管理處罰法
Transcriptions
Standard Mandarin
- Hanyu Pinyin: Zhōnghuá Rénmín Gònghéguó Zhì'ān Guǎnlǐ Chǔfáfǎ

The Law of the People's Republic of China on Penalties for Administration of Public Security is a Chinese law regulates acts that violate public security administration but do not yet constitute criminal offenses. It was adopted on 28 August 2005, at a meeting of the Standing Committee of the National People's Congress, and came into effect on 1 March 2006. Its predecessor was the Regulations of the People's Republic of China on Penalties for Administration of Public Security.

Compared with most countries in the world that have almost no corresponding public security administration and punishment laws, the public security administration and punishment laws of China maintain social order and play an important role in people's lives with their independent historical status. This law is also referred to by some people as "minor criminal law".

== History ==
=== Background ===
The predecessor of the Law on Administrative Penalties for Public Security was the Regulations on Administrative Penalties for Public Security. In 1955, the drafting group of the Regulations on Administrative Penalties for Public Security was established. The main drafter was Wu Shichang, and Liu Shipu, the former director of the Fire Bureau of the Ministry of Public Security and a major general of the Armed Police, was also the main drafter of the law. In 1956, the 8th National Congress of the Chinese Communist Party proposed that the large-scale class struggle had passed and that the democratic legal system should be improved, which also accelerated the legislative process. As the Regulations on Administrative Penalties for Public Security had been drafted for several years, and the repeated solicitation of opinions from all walks of life and revisions made Liu Shipu feel anxious. At a meeting of the Great Leap Forward, Liu Shipu criticized the slow legislative process of the law. He was almost labeled as a "rightist" afterward, but it was later concluded that he "only sympathized with the rightists and it was a mistake of thought". Not long after, Liu Shipu learned that the law had been submitted to the Standing Committee of the National People's Congress for review.

On October 22, 1957, the Regulations on Administrative Penalties for Public Security was adopted and implemented at the 81st meeting of the Standing Committee of the 1st National People's Congress. As the legal names at that time had not been strictly classified and standardized, the administrative regulations passed by the State Council were called "Regulations", and some of the laws passed by the NPC Standing Committee were also called "Regulations", while this law was named "Regulations". However, in terms of the hierarchy of legal norms, although the law passed by the Standing Committee of the National People's Congress at that time was named "Regulations", it was actually a law. After the founding of the People's Republic of China, all the old laws of the Republic of China were abolished, but the Law on Penalties for Violations of Police still needed to be partially retained. Despite the great controversy at that time, the Regulations on Administrative Penalties for Public Security" in 1957 still absorbed a lot of the content of the Law on Penalties for Violations of Police. In addition, there was a great deal of disagreement about the name of the law. During the formulation process, some people suggested adding the word "administrative" to the name of the law, namely Regulations on Administrative Penalties for Public Security, which was still controversial when it was submitted to the NPC Standing Committee for review. Finally, in order to highlight its administrative nature, the "Regulations on Administrative Penalties for Public Security" was officially adopted as the name of the law. At the same time, after the implementation of the regulations, disputes began to arise regarding the "fines" penalty, which later led Mao Zedong to pay attention to the issue. In 1958, the Ministry of Public Security decided to suspend the "fines" penalty.

In 1986, the 17th meeting of the Standing Committee of the 6th National People's Congress passed the new "Regulations on Administrative Penalties for Public Security", which came into effect on 1 January 1987. On May 12, 1994, the 7th meeting of the Standing Committee of the 8th National People's Congress revised the regulations and re-promulgated them for implementation. Although there was a distinction between "regulations" and "laws" at that time, the name "regulations" was still used in accordance with the principle of respecting history and adapting to reality, so that the public could better adapt to the law. In addition, when the " Administrative Penalty Law " was formulated in 1996, the relationship between the Regulations on Administrative Penalties for Public Security and the Administrative Penalty Law was taken into consideration. However, as a special law, the Regulations on Administrative Penalties for Public Security did not conflict with the Administrative Penalty Law.

=== Law on Penalties for Administration of Public Security ===
After entering the 21st century, with the development of the social economy, many new situations and problems have emerged in social security. At the same time, the promulgation of the newly promulgated Criminal Law, Administrative Penalty Law, Administrative Reconsideration Law, Administrative Litigation Law and Road Traffic Safety Law has caused some provisions in the regulations to conflict with them, and has also caused law enforcement officers to encounter embarrassment in the specific implementation process. In addition, in order to adapt to the level of economic development, the amount of fines stipulated in the existing regulations is obviously too low, and it is necessary to increase the range of fines. In October 2004, the 12th meeting of the Standing Committee of the 10th National People's Congress reviewed the Law of the People's Republic of China on Administrative Penalties for Public Security (Draft), which is a revision of the Regulations of the People's Republic of China on Administrative Penalties for Public Security. At the same time, its name was changed from "Regulations" to "Law" to better comply with the provisions of the Legislation Law. On 28 August 2005, the 17th meeting of the Standing Committee of the 10th National People's Congress passed the Law of the People's Republic of China on Administrative Penalties for Public Security, which came into effect on 1 March 2006. The newly promulgated Law on Public Security Administration Punishment added units as the objects of punishment. If a unit violates public security administration, its directly responsible supervisors and other directly responsible personnel shall be punished in accordance with the provisions of the law.

On 8 January 2011, Premier Wen Jiabao issued State Council Decree No. 588, Decision of the State Council on Abolishing and Amending Some Administrative Regulations, which amended the Regulations on Administrative Penalties for Public Security cited in 46 administrative regulations to the Law on Administrative Penalties for Public Security. On 27 October 2012, the 29th meeting of the Standing Committee of the 11th National People's Congress passed a decision to amend the Law of the People's Republic of China on Administrative Penalties for Public Security, which amended only Article 60, Paragraph 4.

==== 2025 revision ====
In January 2017, the Ministry of Public Security released the Draft Amendment to the Law on Penalties for Administration of Public Security (for Public Comment). Due to the significant controversy surrounding the draft, the State Council ultimately postponed the approval of the draft amendment. Subsequently, there were continuous calls for improving and revising the Law on Penalties for Administration of Public Security.

In June 2023, the State Council executive meeting approved in principle the Draft Amendment to the Law of the People's Republic of China on Penalties for Administration of Public Security and submitted it to the Standing Committee of the National People's Congress for deliberation. On 28 August 2023, the fifth session of the Standing Committee of the 14th National People's Congress submitted the Draft Amendment to the Law of the People's Republic of China on Penalties for Administration of Public Security for deliberation. Minister of Justice He Rong stated in her explanation that the draft amendment is based on timely and effective resolution of conflicts and disputes and maintenance of social order. It includes newly emerging behaviors that affect social order within the scope of management and adds corresponding penalties. She said that in response to the hot social issues that have emerged in recent years, the draft amendment adds several behaviors that should be punished, including cheating in examinations, organizing and leading pyramid schemes, obstructing the driving of public transportation vehicles by grabbing the steering wheel, releasing sky lanterns with open flames, throwing objects from high altitudes, "black flight" of drones, and illegal use of eavesdropping and photographing equipment. At the same time, it imposes heavier penalties on behaviors that infringe on the rights and interests of minors and adds provisions for sealing up records of minors who violate public security management, and administrative detention can be imposed on minors who are 14 years old but under 16 years old for more than two violations within one year. In addition, the draft revision is coordinated with other laws such as the newly revised Administrative Penalty Law, further rationally setting penalty measures and ranges, and optimizing penalty procedures.

On September 1, the draft revision of the Public Security Administration Punishment Law was open for public comment until September 30. According to the official website of the National People's Congress, in the eight days since the draft revision was opened for public comment, 70,161 comments have been received from 59,302 people, which is the most among the five draft laws that were open for public comment during the same period. After two years and three deliberations, the revised Public Security Administration Punishment Law was passed on 27 June 2025, and will come into effect on 1 January 2026. In addition to including penalties for newly emerging behaviors that affect public security, the revised law also increased the penalties for minors. For example, minors who commit two violations within a year or whose circumstances are serious, or who organize or coerce minors to engage in paid companionship in bars or karaoke rooms, will be subject to administrative penalties. Furthermore, student bullying behaviors such as beatings and intimidation will be dealt with according to law, and a mechanism for holding schools accountable will be established in conjunction with the law. The revised law also established a system for sealing records of violations of public security. Except for inquiries by relevant state organs for case handling or by relevant units in accordance with national regulations, records of citizens' violations of public security management shall be sealed and shall not be provided or disclosed to any unit or individual.

In September 2023, a draft revision of the Public Security Administration Punishment Law was released, with Article 34 for the first time including acts that "damage the spirit of the Chinese nation or hurt the feelings of the Chinese nation" within the scope of punishment. This revision sparked controversy, with some legal scholars publicly expressing their opposition. Most people generally believe that the draft revision does not provide a specific definition of acts that "hurt the feelings of the Chinese nation" or "damage the spirit of the Chinese nation," leading legal professionals and netizens to question whether it could become a new catch-all crime. In addition, Article 59 of the draft has also raised concerns among scholars. On September 11, a spokesperson for the Legislative Affairs Commission of the Standing Committee of the National People's Congress responded that the Legislative Affairs Commission will carefully review and study the matter and propose suggestions for revision or proper handling. The Constitution and Law Committee of the National People's Congress, based on the opinions of the Standing Committee of the National People's Congress, the relevant special committees, and the opinions put forward by various parties, conducts a unified review of the draft law, submits a report on the revisions or a report on the review results and a revised draft law, and submits it to the Standing Committee for review in accordance with legal procedures.

Ultimately, after receiving widespread criticism, the second draft of the revised Public Security Administration Punishment Law, published by the Standing Committee of the National People's Congress in June 2024, no longer included words such as hurting national feelings and specific illegal matters. In Article 35, Paragraph 5 of the Public Security Administration Punishment Law, which was revised and adopted on June 27, 2025, "hurting national feelings" was clearly defined as "wearing or displaying clothing or symbols that promote or glorify wars of aggression or acts of aggression in public places or forcing others to wear or display such clothing or symbols in public places, refusing to listen to advice, and causing adverse social impact", which will be subject to public security punishment. In June 2025, the Law on Penalties for Administration of Public Security was promulgated and will take effect on 1 January 2026. Among the new provisions, a system of sealing up penalty records for violations of public security administration (including drug use, prostitution, drunk driving, etc.) is implemented. These records shall not be disclosed to units or the public and shall only be allowed to be accessed by state organs in handling cases or in special circumstances as stipulated by law. Since drug use penalty records are also included in the scope of sealing, it has sparked heated discussions.

== Content ==
The Law on Penalties for Administration of Public Security consists of 6 chapters and 119 articles, including General Provisions, Types and Application of Penalties, Violations of Public Security Administration and Penalties, Punishment Procedures, Law Enforcement Supervision and Supplementary Provisions". The General Provisions covers the scope of application of this law and the responsibilities of government agencies; Types and Application of Penalties clarifies the types of public security administration penalties and the exceptions for different types of violators. For specific types of violators, penalties may be mitigated, reduced, or not imposed, or may be imposed more severely, depending on the circumstances; Violations of Public Security Administration and Penalties is divided into four sections, namely, acts and penalties for disturbing public order, endangering public safety, infringing on personal and property rights, and hindering social management; "Punishment Procedures is divided into three parts: investigation, decision, and execution, clarifying the specific provisions of the public security administration penalty process; Law Enforcement Supervision clarifies the responsibilities that public security organs and their police officers should fulfill regarding public security administration penalties.

According to Article 10 of the Law on Penalties for Administration of Public Security, the types of penalties for administration of public security are warning, fine, administrative detention and revocation of licenses issued by public security organs. Foreigners who violate public security administration may be subject to additional penalties such as being ordered to leave the country within a specified period or being deported.

Article 50, Paragraph 1 of the Law on Penalties for Administration of Public Security contains relevant provisions regarding the refusal to comply with decisions and orders lawfully issued in emergency situations, the content of which is as follows:

Anyone who commits any of the following acts shall be given a warning or fined not more than 200 yuan; if the circumstances are serious, he/she shall be detained for not less than five days but not more than ten days, and may also be fined not more than 500 yuan: (i) Refusing to comply with decisions or orders lawfully issued by the People's Government under emergency circumstances;

Article 80 of the new Public Security Administration Punishment Law, which came into effect on 1 January 2026, made clear and detailed provisions on the punishment for disseminating obscene information and increased the severity of punishment. It stipulates that "disseminating obscene information by using information networks, telephones and other communication tools" shall be subject to detention for not less than 10 days and not more than 15 days, and may be subject to a fine of not more than 5,000 yuan; if the circumstances are minor, they shall also face detention for not more than five days or a fine of not less than 1,000 yuan and not more than 3,000 yuan. Related topics have sparked controversy on the Internet, with some believing that the new law is "too broad." Public Security Administration Punishment Law promulgated in 2005 stipulated that using the Internet to publish obscene photos and videos constitutes a violation of public security. However, the new law changed the original "computer information network" to "information network," adjusted the amount of fines, and added provisions for stricter punishment of violations involving minors.
