= Labour Law of the People's Republic of China =

Chinese labour law

The Labour Law of the People's Republic of China (simplified Chinese: 中华人民共和国劳动法; traditional Chinese: 中華人民共和國勞動法; pinyin: Zhōnghuá Rénmín Gònghéguó Láodòng Fǎ) is the basic labour law of China, which has been enforced since 1995. It was promulgated by the Standing Committee of the National People's Congress of China on July 5, 1994, and came into effect on January 1, 1995.

It is sometimes confused with the Labour Contract Law of the People's Republic of China because of their similar names and focuses, as well as imprecise media reports. As the Labour Contract Law is more recent, having gone into effect January 1, 2008, the Labour Law is also sometimes called the "old labour law", though this is incorrect as both are still in effect simultaneously.

== Contents of the law ==
The law has 107 articles in 13 chapters. The titles of all the chapters are listed below.

1. General Provisions
2. Promotion of Employment
3. Labour Contracts and Collective Contracts
4. Working Hours, Rests, and Leaves
5. Wages
6. Labour Safety and Sanitation
7. Special Protection for Female Staff and Workers and Juvenile Workers
8. Professional Training
9. Social Insurance and Welfare Treatment
10. Labour Disputes
11. Supervision and Inspection
12. Legal Responsibilities
13. Supplementary Provisions

The purpose of the law, stated by Article 1 in the first chapter, is to "protect the legitimate rights and interests of labourers, readjust labour relationship, establish and safeguard the labour system suiting the socialist market economy, and promote economic development and social progress".

There are 20 articles concerning labour contracts and collective contracts in the third chapter. In 2008, the 98-article-long Labour Contract Law came into effect to further regulate related behaviours.

The law was amended with minor correction in 2009.

== Criticism from the public ==
The law is widely criticised for its defects. This is one of the reasons for the promulgation of the Labour Contract Law which came into effect on January 1, 2008. For example, though collective contract has been put into laws for more than 15 years, collective bargaining is not doing well in China. The term collective negotiation (集体协商) first appeared in laws in 2007, instead of collective bargaining (集体谈判), which is less decisive than the latter.

== Related laws ==
This is a list of related Chinese laws, but does not cover every law related.

- Labour Contract Law of the People's Republic of China
- Trade Union Law of the People's Republic of China
- Law of the People's Republic of China on Labour Dispute Mediation and Arbitration
- Employment Promotion Law of the People's Republic of China
- Law of the People's Republic of China on the Protection of Women's Rights and Interests
- Production Safety Law of the People's Republic of China
- Law of the People's Republic of China on Promoting Clean Production
- Law of the People's Republic of China on the Prevention and Treatment of Occupational Diseases
