= Fourth session of the 10th National People's Congress =

2006 National People's Congress; 第十届全国人民代表大会第四次会议; _{4th plenary session of the}; _{10th National People's Congress}; 5 March – 14 March
President	Premier	Congress Chairman
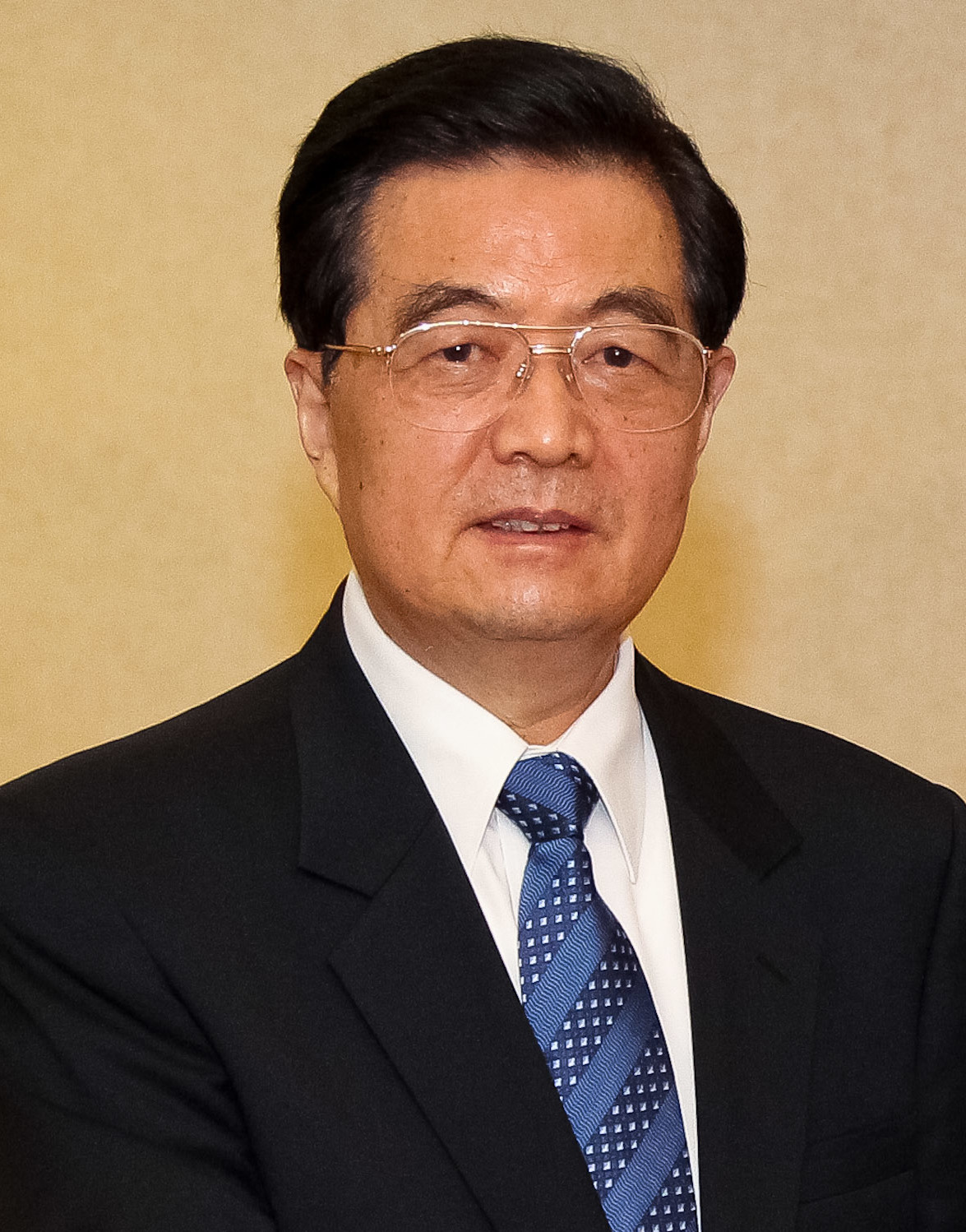
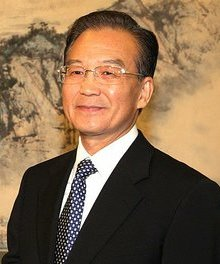
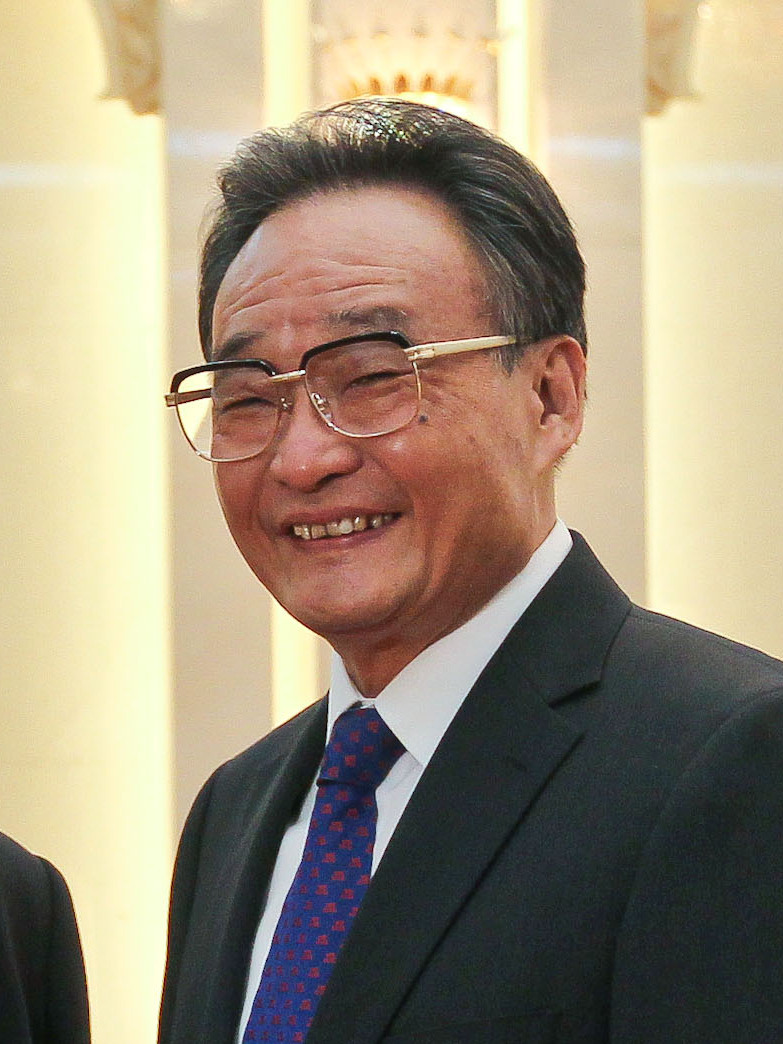
Hu Jintao	Wen Jiabao	Wu Bangguo
since 15 March 2003	since 16 March 2003	since 15 March 2003

The 4th Session of the 10th National People's Congress was held in Beijing, China, in conjunction with the 2006 Chinese People's Political Consultative Conference. Many items were listed on the agenda for the two-week-long session of the 10th National People's Congress. 2,937 delegates from every province, municipality, and Special Administrative Region were in attendance. The 2006 Session was chaired by Standing Committee Chairman Wu Bangguo.

== The session ==
The National People's Congress is the People's Republic of China's highest legislative body. The congress is composed of members from the Chinese People's Political Consultative Conference, a coalition of nine parties. In practice the final vote on legislation is nearly always close to unanimous, and legislative practice has been to achieve consensus before the final vote including the approval of senior officials of the Chinese Communist Party and the State Council of the People's Republic of China.

Because of this practice, controversial items can be removed from the NPC agenda if there is serious disagreement over the contents of the legislation. This occurred this session with the Property Law of the People's Republic of China which was originally scheduled for approval this year but was dropped after objections from the Leftist party members who argued that the draft did not sufficiently protect state assets.

Formal issues listed for discussion include the "Three Rural Issues" from agricultural reform, cracking down on corruption, and studying the Three Represents as the guide for Chinese policy in the days ahead. Formally, Premier Wen Jiabao made the annual government report to the Congress outlining government policy and its progress from 2005. The Eleventh Five-Year Plan will undergo review. A Budget will be drafted for the following fiscal year. NPC Standing Committee Chairman Wu Bangguo will review the work of the NPC Standing Committee from last year. The Judiciary system will also make its respective reports.

In official Chinese news, the phrase "core of leadership" has been omitted when describing Hu Jintao. This came in stark contrast to the repetitive "unify under the core of leadership under Jiang Zemin" slogan used frequently in China during his years in power. Vice-Premier Huang Ju was absent because of health problems.

=== Wen Jiabao's government report ===
Premier Wen Jiabao delivered the PRC government's 2006 Working Report on the morning of March 5 at the Great Hall of the People. It was nationally televised on four CCTV channels and other networks. The report was around two hours in length. The three sections of the report outlined the government's workings in 2005, the direction the government was planning for the new year, and a brief outline of China's 11th Five-Year Plan. Agriculture and the "Three Rural Issues" policy was emphasized throughout the speech, as was the concept of "Governing for the People" (执政为民). Wen heavily emphasized helping the poor and relieving the wealth gap. Wen announced that agricultural taxes levied regularly on peasants would be fully abolished in 2007. On the issue of health, Wen stressed the need to prevent an avian influenza-related epidemic, and warned people to be cautious of the outbreak and exercise common sense.

Many Chinese political analysts concluded that the report was thorough, detailed, thoughtful, and reached out to the people. Western media outlets were mostly neutral on the issue. It was considered to have contained fewer political overtones than in previous years. Although Wen's speech was met with frequent applause, the longest applause came during Wen's mention of the firm stance against Taiwan independence. Wen favoured peaceful re-unification, but stated that the Chinese government will not back down should Taiwanese authorities go "too far", as has been his position for the previous two years.

=== Issues discussed ===
Science and technology was a main issue talking point, and there was consensus that China should continue to move forward with their development. Many deputies have shown concern about the urban-rural wealth gap. Critics say women's rights issues have been ignored, noting that the marital rape bill was shot down. New legislation was passed to prevent disabled persons from being discriminated against in education.

Noticeably, the Anti-Secession Law was not mentioned any time during the Sessions, as China wishes to present a more friendly image to the Taiwanese people, in order to promote a peaceful reunification.

== Voting results ==
=== Resolutions ===
Topic	For	Against	Abstain	Rate
Premier Wen Jiabao's Government Work Report				
Draft Outline of the 11th Five-Year Plan for National Economic and Social Development	2,815	50	21	97.54%
Report on the Implementation of the 2005 National Economic and Social Development Plan and the 2006 Draft Plan	2,731	95	55	94.79%
Report on the Execution of the Central and Local Budgets for 2005 and on the Draft Central and Local Budgets for 2006	2,520	256	111	87.29%
Chairman Wu Bangguo's NPCSC Work Report	2,780	65	40	96.36%
Chief Justice Wang Shengjun's Supreme People's Court Work Report	2,257	479	146	78.31%
Procurator-General Jia Chunwang's Supreme People's Procuratorate Work Report	2,361	363	159	81.89%

Preceded by 2005 NPC	Annual National People's Congress Sessions of the People's Republic of China; March 5—15, 2006	Succeeded by 2007 NPC
