= Contract Law of the People's Republic of China =

Law concerning contracts, in force from 1999–2020

The Contract Law of the People's Republic of China was a law in the People's Republic of China (PRC) that came into force on 1 October 1999, and was abolished on 1 January 2021 with the enforcement of Civil Code of the People's Republic of China. It was the main source of contract law in the PRC. The most recent version combines many parts of Chinese contract law that were previously parts of other substantive laws, and has led to increased legal uniformity. The law includes both general and specific provisions and also has the legal rules that relate to the formation, fulfilment and breach of contracts. The law allows for various different types of contracts that can be entered into.

"The principles of the freedom of contract, of good faith, and of the fostering of transactions have informed and guided the formulation of the Contract Law and are embodied in many of its major provisions."

The main purpose of the law is stated in Article 1: "This Law is enacted for the purpose of protecting the legitimate rights and interests of the parties to contracts, maintaining the socio-economic order and promoting the socialist modernization."

Article 2 has the definition for a contract: "For the purpose of this Law, a contract means an agreement on the establishment, alteration or termination of a civil right-obligation relationship between natural persons, legal persons or other organizations as subjects with equal status. Agreements on establishing such personal relationships as marriage, adoption and guardianship shall be governed by the provisions of other laws."

The Contract Law contains 23 chapters and 428 articles.
