= Property Law of the People's Republic of China =

The Property Law of the People's Republic of China

National People's Congress
- Citation: Property Law of the People's Republic of China (English)
- Territorial extent: People's Republic of China but excludes China's Special Administrative Regions.
- Enacted by: Standing Committee of the National People's Congress
- Enacted: 16 March 2007
- Signed by: President Hu Jintao
- Signed: 1 October 2007
- Commenced: 1 October 2007
- Voting summary: 2,799 voted for; 52 voted against; 37 abstained

Repealed by
- Civil Code of the People's Republic of China

Summary
- A law enacted in accordance with the Constitution for the purpose of upholding the basic economic system of the State, maintaining the order of the socialist market economy, defining the attribution of things, giving play to the usefulness of things and protecting the property right of obligees.

Keywords
- Chinese Property Law, Property Law
- Status: Repealed

Property Law of the People's Republic of China
- Simplified Chinese: 中华人民共和国物权法
- Traditional Chinese: 中華人民共和國物權法
Transcriptions
Standard Mandarin
- Hanyu Pinyin: Zhōnghuá Rénmín Gònghéguó Wùquánfǎ

The Property Law of the People's Republic of China was a repealed law of the People's Republic of China.

The law was a property law adopted by the fifth session of the 10th National People's Congress on March 16, 2007 that went into effect on October 1, 2007. The law covers the creation, transfer, and ownership of property in the mainland of the People's Republic of China (PRC) (Note: As most other laws, the Property Law of the People's Republic of China is only effective in Mainland China. Laws of the People's Republic of China are not applied in the special administrative regions of Hong Kong and Macau unless specifically stated in the annex III of each of their basic laws.) and was part of an ongoing effort by the PRC to gradually develop a civil code. It contained all aspects of property law in the PRC's legal system.

The law was drafted quite differently from the usual legislative process in the PRC where laws are drafted behind closed doors, over 14,000 public submissions were considered for over a decade before the law was adopted and put into effect. In developing civil law in the PRC mainland, the PRC government has used the German Pandectist system of classification under which the property law corresponds to the law on real rights, which is the term used in Chinese for the official name of the law. The Property Law was formally repealed by the Civil Code in 2021.

== Passage ==
The drafting of the law involved considerable controversy. The proposed bill caused quite a stir since it was first published in 2002, was subsequently deferred. Over 14,000 public submissions were considered for over a decade before the law was adopted and put into effect. The draft was released online for public comment after the bill’s third review in July 2005.

Many in the Chinese legal community feared that creating a single law to cover both state property and private property would facilitate privatization and asset stripping of state-owned enterprises. The draft law was subject to a constitutional challenge. Legal scholars, notably Gong Xiantian of Peking University, argued that it violated the constitutional characterization of the PRC as a socialist state. Gong called for a complete halt to the legislative process, arguing that by granting equal protection to public and private property, the draft unconstitutionally "departed from basic socialist principles". The law was originally scheduled to be adopted in 2005 but was removed from the legislative agenda following these objections. The final form of the law contains a number of additions to address these objections.

It yet again failed in its reading at the fourth session of the 10th National People's Congress in 2006 because of disputes over its content. Before the bill's seventh review, NPC Standing Committee Chairman Wu Bangguo defended the constitutionality of the bill at a meeting of the NPCSC's Party members, including the provision affording equal protection to private property, at a meeting of the NPCSC’s Communist Party members. The bill finally went through its eighth reading in 2007. Wu's remarks were substantially incorporated into the bill’s official explanation presented to NPC delegates at the start of the eight review.

On March 8, 2007, the Property Law was formally introduced at the NPC. Vice Chairman Wang Zhaoguo told the Congress that the law will "safeguard the fundamental interests of the people", and the law is an attempt at adapting to new "economic and social realities" in China. The law was adopted on March 16, the final day of the two-week session of congress, with the backing of 96.9% of the 2,889 legislators attending, with 2,799 for, 52 against, and 37 abstentions. In his final address to the 2007 Session, Chairman Wu Bangguo declared "the Private Property Law and the Corporate Taxation law are two of the most important laws in the new economic system of Socialism with Chinese characteristics, we must attempt to learn these laws fully through various methods."

== Description ==
The law contained all aspects of property law in the PRC's legal system. The Property Law contains 5 parts, 19 chapters and 247 articles. The parts deal with the following topics:

Part One - General Provisions

Part Two - Ownership

Part Three - Usufructs

Part Four - Security Interest in Property

Part Five - Possession.

The main purpose of the law is stated in Article 1. "This Law is enacted in accordance with the Constitution for the purpose of upholding the basic economic system of the State, maintaining the order of the socialist market economy, defining the attribution of things, giving play to the usefulness of things and protecting the property right of obligees."

Article 9 states, "The creation, alteration, transfer or extinction of the property right shall become valid upon registration according to law; otherwise it shall not become valid, unless otherwise provided for by law. Registration of ownership of all the natural resources which are owned by the State in accordance with law may be dispensed with."

The law covers all of the three property types within the People's Republic of China, which are state, collective, and private which are defined in Chapter 5 of the law. Chapter 4, Article 40 of the law divides property rights into three types: ownership rights, use rights, and security rights. The law goes into detail about the legal rights associated with any of these three types.

The law does not change the system of land tenure by which the state owns all land. However, in formalizing existing practice, individuals can possess a land-use right, which is defined in Chapter 10 of the law. The law defines this land-use right in terms of the civil law concept of usufruct.

== Response ==
Some press reports have characterized this law as the first piece of legislation in the People's Republic of China to cover an individual's right to own private assets, although this is incorrect as the right to private property was written into the Constitution of China in 2004. The Property Law was formally repealed by the Civil Code in 2021.

== See also ==
- Chinese property law
- Intellectual property in the People's Republic of China
- Nail houses
- land reform
