= Three Rural Issues =

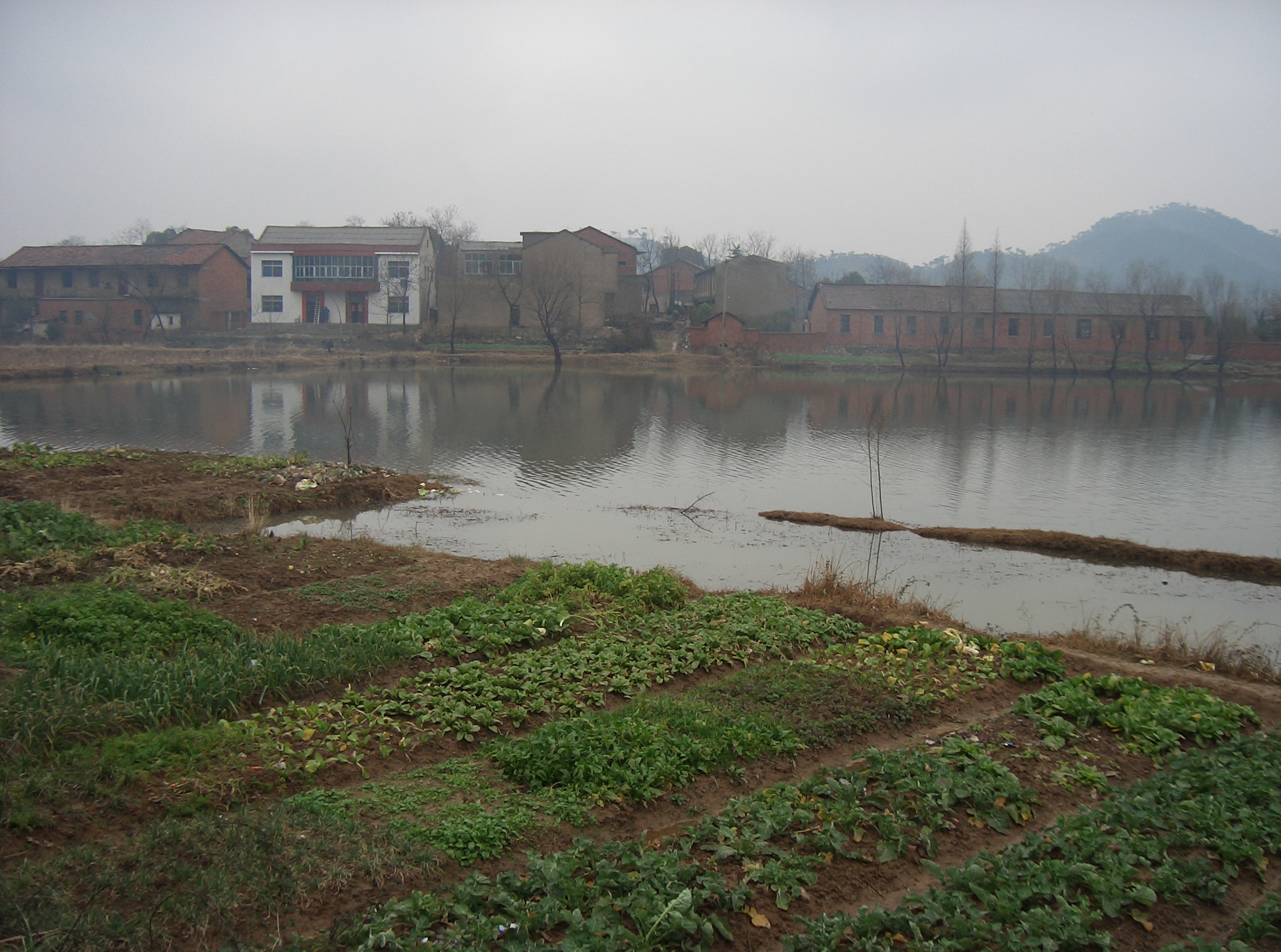
A rural scene in Hubei Province (2005)

The Three Rural Issues, or San Nong (simplified Chinese: 三农; traditional Chinese: 三農; pinyin: sān nóng), are three issues relating to rural development in mainland China: agriculture, rural areas and farmers. The name "Three Rural Issues" were highlighted by CCP general secretary Hu Jintao and Chinese premier Wen Jiabao as areas of rural development in China that need work.

At the 2006 National People's Congress, the Three Rural Issues were especially emphasized throughout Wen Jiabao's speech on the workings of the government in 2005 and the direction of the government for the year 2006. In the rural areas, agricultural reforms had made the peasants better-off until the 1990s when land supply became insufficient and the cost of the means of production was soaring. As a result, the income of the peasants was greatly reduced. Today, the "three problem of peasantry, rural areas and agriculture" are still a major concern of the government.

== Content ==
- Agricultural issues: The main problem is agricultural production and operation, specifically how to achieve agricultural industrialization. This is mainly due to the low degree of marketability of agricultural production and operation and the high volatility of agricultural prices; the fact that agricultural production mainly relies on small-scale farmers, making it difficult to obtain economies of scale; and the fact that the issue of food security has never been neglected.
- Rural issues: It is concentrated in the urban-rural dichotomy caused by the household registration system, with a large difference in economic and cultural levels between urban and rural areas. The image is likened to China's City like Europe, the countryside is like Africa.
- Farmers' issues: The main problems are the low income of farmers, the large gap between urban and rural incomes, the low overall cultural quality of farmers and the lack of protection of farmers' Rights, etc.

"The countryside is the cradle of the Chinese nation, agriculture is the foundation of the national economy, and farmers are our bread and butter. If we lose these three, we will also lose the foundation of our nation".

=== Agriculture ===
In general, the issue is how to industrialize agriculture in China.

It includes:

- increasing the marketization level of agricultural production and operation, and stabilizing the prices of agricultural products
- changing the situation of smallholder economic agriculture, achieving economies of scale of agricultural production and operation
- guaranteeing the food security in China.

=== Rural areas ===
This is particularly reflected in the disparity of economic and cultural development between urban and rural areas. It is mainly caused by the dual segmentation based on the household registration system.

=== Farmers ===
It includes improving the income level of farmers, alleviating burdens of farmers, increasing the cultural qualities of farmers, and safeguarding the rights of farmers.

== See also ==
- 2006 National People's Congress
- Economy of China
- Agriculture in China
