= Tort Liability Law of the People's Republic of China =

The Tort Liability Law of the People's Republic of China (Chinese: 中华人民共和国侵权责任法) is a law in the PRC that came into force on the 1 July 2010. it covers the area of torts including personal injury and medical malpractice It also covers areas such as damage to the environment and the legal liability for individuals who rear animals. The overwhelming majority of tort liabilities are included in this law, as well as legal concepts such as mitigating factors and liability for products.

The Tort Law was clearly influenced in part by foreign legal systems, since the legal concept of "tort" did not exist in the PRC before the 1980s. The goal of the law is to borrow from laws on tort from both common and civil laws systems while incorporating a unique "Chineseness" to the law itself. There is some legal ambiguity over whether or not the Tort Law or the 1986 Civil Code are applicable in the case of a conflict. There is some skepticism by legal scholars on whether the Tort Law will enforced by courts when it will negatively affect China's economic interests.

The Tort Liability Law contains 12 chapters and 92 articles. The chapters deal with the following topics:

- Chapter I – General Provisions
- Chapter II – Constitution and Mode of Liability
- Chapter III – Non-liability and Diminished Liability
- Chapter IV – Special Provisions on the Subject of Liability
- Chapter V – Product Liability
- Chapter VI – Motor Vehicle Accident Liability
- Chapter VII – Medical Damage Liability
- Chapter VIII – Environmental Pollution Liability
- Chapter IX – High Risk Liability
- Chapter X – Liability for Damage Caused by Domesticated Animals
- Chapter XI – Object Damage Liability
- Chapter XII – Supplementary Provisions

Article 54 allows individuals to sue doctors for medical malpractice. Article 65 allows for tort liability when pollution of the environment leads to damages.
