= Gong Xiantian =

Gong Xiantian (Chinese: 巩献田; pinyin: Gǒng Xiàntián; born November, 1944) is a professor of jurisprudence at Beijing University Law School. In 2005, he openly challenged the constitutionality of the draft of the Property Law.

His challenge was considered a reason for delaying the submission of the draft to the National People's Congress. The chairman of the NPC, Wu Bangguo nevertheless promised that the Property Law would be passed in the 2007 sitting, following a 6th reading of the draft. In late 2006, Gong again led a circular letter campaign to protest passage of the Law.

== Biography ==
Gong was born in Huantai, Zibo, Shandong in 1944. He received his LLB degree from Beijing College of Political Science and Law in 1967, LLM degree from Beijing University Law School in 1981, and PhD degree from University of Sarajevo in 1987.
