= Cleaner Production Promotion Law =

Cleaner Production Promotion Law was approved by the Standing Committee of the National People’s Congress (NPC) of the People’s Republic of China in the 28th Session on June 29, 2002.

The law was enacted to promote cleaner production, increase the efficiency of the utilization rate of resources, reduce and avoid the generation of pollutants, protect and improve environments, ensure the health of human beings and promote the sustainable development of the economy and society.

Article 28 of the law stipulates that:

"Enterprises shall monitor resource consumption and generation of wastes during the course of production and provision of services, and conduct cleaner production audits with respect to production and service procedures according to need. Enterprises that exceed the national or local discharging standards or exceed the total volume control targets for pollutants set by the relevant local people’s governments shall conduct cleaner production audits. Any enterprise using toxic and hazardous materials in production or discharging toxic and hazardous substances shall periodically conduct cleaner production audits, and report the audit results to the relevant administrative departments for environmental protection and the relevant departments for economics and trade under the local people’s government at or above county level."
