= Trademark law of China =

The system of trademark law in mainland China is administered by the China National Intellectual Property Administration CNIPA (with an appeal function administered by the Trademark Review and Adjudication Board and the courts). Both are divisions of the State Administration for Industry & Commerce (SAIC).

== History ==
China first established its Trademark Law in 1982.

The two principal pieces of legislation forming the trademark system are the Trademark Law, and the Unfair Competition Law.

Only registered trade and service marks are protected in the PRC: there is no common law protection for unregistered trademarks (except for "well-known" marks, as detailed below).

In 2000, China amended the Trademark Law to ensure compliance with its obligations with the TRIPS Agreement.

== Trademark registration ==
China uses a first-to-file trademark registration system. Trademark registrants do not need to demonstrate their prior use of a trademark. However, a person may not register a mark in bad faith or without intent to use, nor infringe on others' prior use rights, as these are grounds for refusal.

== See also ==
- Intellectual property
- Law in the People's Republic of China
- Chinese law
- Hong Kong trademark law
