= General Principles of the Civil Law of the People's Republic of China =

1986 law in China

The General Principles of the Civil Law of the People's Republic of China (Chinese: 中华人民共和国民法通则) is a law in the People's Republic of China (PRC) that was promulgated on April 12, 1986, and came into force on January 1, 1987. It is heavily influenced by the German Civil Code. It is the main source of civil law in the PRC and seeks to provide a uniform framework for interpreting the PRC's civil laws.

Unlike most civil law jurisdictions, the PRC had no comprehensive civil code until 2021, and attempts to create one by the Chinese government have been difficult and controversial. The "General Principles" include both civil rights and liabilities under civil law, and contains 9 chapters and 156 articles. The chapters deal with the following topics:

1. Basic Principles
2. Citizen (Natural Person)
3. Legal Persons
4. Civil Juristic Acts and Agency
5. Civil Rights
6. Civil Liability
7. Limitation of Action
8. Application of Law in Civil Relations with Foreigners
9. Supplementary Provisions

== See also ==
- Civil Code of People's Republic of China; passed on May 28, 2020, effective January 1, 2021.
