= Labour Contract Law of the People's Republic of China =

Primary source of labour law in China

Standing Committee of the National People's Congress
- Long title: Labour Contract Law of the People's Republic of China
- Citation: Labour Contract Law (English)
- Territorial extent: People's Republic of China but excludes China's Special Administrative Regions.
- Enacted by: Standing Committee of the National People's Congress
- Enacted: June 29, 2007
- Commenced: January 1, 2008

Amended by
- Labor Contract Law of the People's Republic of China (2012 Amendment)

Summary
- A law enacted in order to improve the labor contract system, define the rights and obligations of parties to a labor contract, protect the legitimate rights and interests of workers, and establish and develop a harmonious and stable labor relationships.
- Status: In force

The Labour Contract Law of the People's Republic of China (Chinese: 中华人民共和国劳动合同法) is the primary source of labour law in China and went into effect on January 1, 2008, following a series of staff-sacking scandals in many companies. The Ministry of Human Resources and Social Security of the People's Republic of China is the responsible government department for administrating this law.

== The Law ==
While the enforcement of the law and its efficacity is sometimes questioned, the labor contract law promised to enable workers to get their employment granted only on basis of a contract, provide guidelines for standing working hour regulations of maximum 40 hours per week, non-tolerance for delayed payment of wages, relaxations in terms of paid leave etc.

== Background ==
The All-China Federation of Trade Unions (ACFTU) had the major role in advancing the Labor Contract Law. The ACFTU drafted the law and proposed it to the National People's Congress. The NPC conducted research trips to regions with labor-intensive industries like Guangdong. After multiple rounds of formal discussions and informal negotiations and consultations, the law was passed.

== Amendment ==
The Standing Committee of the 11th National People's Congress adopted the decision on the Revision of the Labor Contract Law of the People's Republic of China ('Amendment'). The Amendment will take effect July 1, 2013, with the claimed intention to provide better protection to workers employed by labor dispatching agencies.

Highlighted requirements include:

- Labor dispatch agency must have a minimum registered capital of no less than RMB 2,000,000;
- Operate from a permanent business premise with facilities that are suitable to conduct its business;
- have internal dispatch rules that are compliant with the relevant laws and administrative regulations;
- Satisfy other conditions as prescribed by laws and administrative regulations; and
- Apply for an administrative license and obtain approval from the relevant labor authorities.

All labor dispatch agencies established after July 1, 2013, will need to meet these new local labor law requirements before they can start the company registration process. Existing agencies that are already licensed have until July 1, 2014, to meet all local labor law requirements before renewing their business registration.

== See also ==
- Labour Law of the People's Republic of China
