= Company Law of the People's Republic of China =

Corporate law of mainland China

The Company Law of the People's Republic of China is a law which was passed by the National People's Congress of the PRC on 29 December 1993 and came into force on 1 July 1994. It has been amended several times since then. The law regulates limited liability and joint stock companies.

The main purpose of the law is stated in Article 1, "The Company Law of the People's Republic of China (hereinafter referred to as the "Law") has been enacted in order to standardize the organization and activities of companies, protect the lawful rights and interests of companies, shareholders and creditors, safeguard the social and economic order and promote the development of the socialist market economy."

Article 14 states that all companies must "strengthen the construction of socialist culture and ideology and accept the supervision of the government and the public." The Company Law states that all private companies and state-owned enterprises (SOEs) must permit Chinese Communist Party (CCP) committees to be established within them and provide the necessary conditions for such committees to operate.

The 1994 Company Law provided restructuring guidelines for SOEs, such as adopting more corporate structures like shareholding and limited liability, procedures for paying dividends, establishing subsidies, and bankruptcy. The law stated that the government would continue to make supervisory appointments for SOEs and provided that workers would be consulted. Some smaller SOEs sold their shares to workers and management, therefore making them privately owned.

The 1994 Company Law established the legal status, which allowed township and village enterprises to re-organize as private enterprises.

In 2024, the law underwent significant reforms. All companies with more than 300 employees, including local subsidiaries of multinational corporations, became required to appoint a worker representative to the board who must be consulted for all major company decisions.
