= Administrative Procedure Law of the People's Republic of China =

Basic law of the People's Republic of China

The Administrative Procedure Law of the People's Republic of China (Chinese: 中华人民共和国行政诉讼法; APL) is legislation passed in 1990 that authorized private suits against administrative organs and personal on the grounds of infringement of their rights. The law is often referred to in English as the Administrative Litigation Law (ALL), which is a closer translation of the Chinese, but which is not the official English translation used by the PRC government. This law is often invoked in housing disputes.

In 2015, the Administrative Law was revised. The revisions expanded the people's rights to sue the government.

The Administrative Procedure Law is thought to be an important achievement in enforcing the Chinese Constitution and its socialist legal system. Also according to economist Keyu Jin, the revisions to the Administrative Procedure Law codified in 2021 marked a new milestone in improving the rule of law in China.
