= Legislation Law of the People's Republic of China =

Chinese law

The Legislation Law of the People's Republic of China is a law passed by the National People's Congress which describes the relationship between laws and regulations as well as the roles of various institutions in the Chinese government.

Among the interesting parts of the law is Article 8 which establishes the principle that only a law passed by the NPC can be used to criminalize activity. This article was invoked in the case of Sun Zhigang incident to overturn regulations on the detention of migrants.

In addition Articles 78 to 92 outline a procedure for resolving conflicts between laws which is primarily legislative in nature.
