= Five-in-one =

Chinese Communist Party slogan

- Simplified Chinese: "五位一体"总体布局
Transcriptions
Standard Mandarin
- Hanyu Pinyin: "Wǔ wèi yītǐ" zǒngtǐ bùjú

The "five-in-one" overall plan is a political slogan promoted by the Chinese Communist Party (CCP) regarding how to achieve the CCP's stated goals of socialist modernization and the "great rejuvenation of the Chinese nation."

== History ==
The slogan was first introduced by CCP General Secretary Hu Jintao at the 18th National Congress of the Chinese Communist Party in November 2012 as a way to achieve socialist modernization and the "great rejuvenation of the Chinese nation." Hu said the term was conductive to "the achievement of people-centered, comprehensively coordinated and sustainable scientific development".

At the CCP's 19th National Congress in October 2017, the phrase was incorporated into Xi Jinping Thought. At the first session of the 13th National People's Congress on 11 March 2018, the preamble of the country's constitution was amended to include the overall plan.

== Content ==
The "five-in-one" overall plan includes:

- Economic construction
- Political construction
- Cultural construction
- Social construction
- Ecological civilization construction

According to the CCP, the goal of the plan is to build China as a "great modern socialist country that is prosperous, strong, democratic, culturally advanced, harmonious, and beautiful".
