= Constitutional oath of office of China =

Civil oath

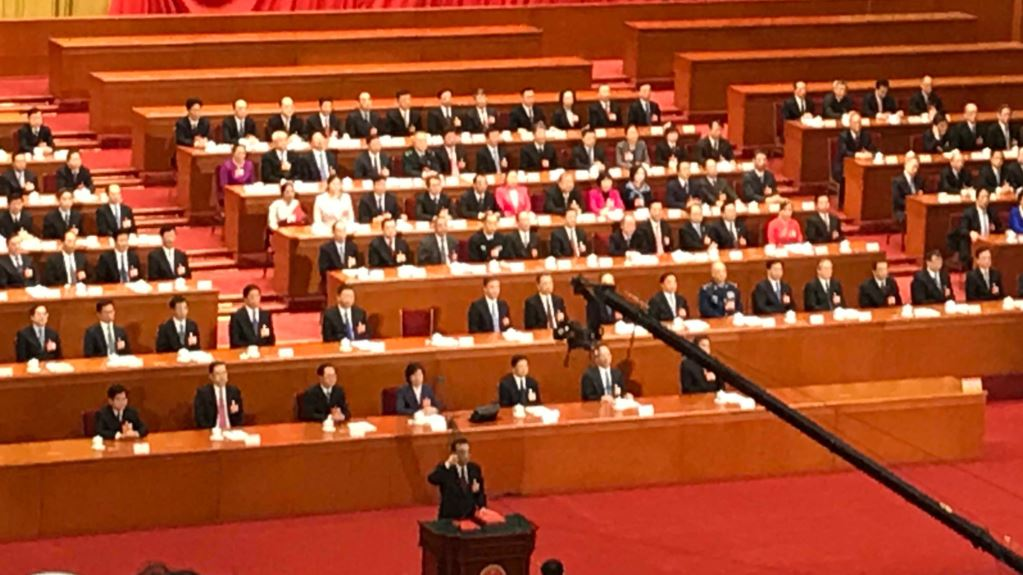
Li Keqiang publicly swore an oath to the constitution upon formally taking office after he was appointed as the Premier in the 1st Session of the 13th National People's Congress.

A constitutional oath of office of the People's Republic of China was implemented on January 1, 2016, through a decision by the Standing Committee of the National People's Congress of China. The oath of office requirement applies to state civil servants elected or appointed by the National People's Congress and its Standing Committee at or above the county level.

== Background and history ==
After the overthrow of the last imperial dynasty in 1911, the Republic of China was founded and an oath system was imposed with Sun Yat-sen taking the helm. The oath system continues today in Taiwan and is specified in Article 48 of the Constitution of the Republic of China.

Since the proclamation of the People's Republic of China in 1949, a constitutional oath system had never been established. Hong Kong and Macau each had oath systems prior to their return to the PRC, and both regions implemented oaths according to the Hong Kong Basic Law and Macau Basic Law, respectively, following China's resumption of sovereignty.

On October 23, 2014, the Fourth Plenum of the 18th Central Committee of the Chinese Communist Party proposed "establishing a constitutional oath system, such that all state civil servants elected or appointed by the National People's Congress or its Standing Committee publicly swear an oath to the constitution upon formally taking office." On July 1, 2015, the 15th Meeting of the 12th Standing Committee of the National People's Congress passed a decision to implement a constitutional oath, with an effective date of January 1, 2016. State civil servants elected or appointed by the National People's Congress, its Standing Committee, the State Council, the Central Military Commission, the Supreme People's Court, the Supreme People's Procuratorate, and other central government organs, as well as equivalent local government organs at or above the county level, are required to publicly swear an oath to the constitution upon taking office.

On February 23, 2018, the 33rd Meeting of the 12th Standing Committee of the National People's Congress revised the decision that instituted the constitutional oath. The constitutional oath's last phrase was changed to "to work for a great modern socialist country that is prosperous, strong, democratic, culturally advanced, harmonious, and beautiful." In addition, the oath-taking requirement was expanded to include members of the newly created National Supervisory Commission, and required the national anthem to be played at the oath taking ceremony. At the first session of the 13th National People's Congress on 11 March 2018, the Constitution of China was amended to include the constitutional oath.

== Ceremony ==
The oath may be taken individually or in a group. If taken individually, the oath taker places their left hand on a copy of the Constitution, and raises their right hand in a fist. If taken in a group, one person leads the ceremony, with their left hand on a copy of the Constitution and their right hand raised in a fist. The other oath takers stand in a line with their right hands raised in a fist, and recite the oath along with the leader. The ceremony is to be "dignified" and "solemn," with the Chinese flag or the national emblem present. The national anthem must also be played at the ceremony.

== Oath ==
=== People's Republic of China ===
As prescribed by the decision in 2015 and effective in 2016:

Chinese: "我宣誓：忠于中华人民共和国宪法，维护宪法权威，履行法定职责，忠于祖国、忠于人民，恪尽职守、廉洁奉公，接受人民监督，为建设富强、民主、文明、和谐的社会主义国家努力奋斗！"; pinyin: Wǒ xuānshì: Zhōngyú zhōnghuá rénmín gònghéguó xiànfǎ, wéihù xiànfǎ quánwēi, lǚxíng fǎdìng zhízé, zhōngyú zǔguó, zhōngyú rénmín, kèjìnzhíshǒu, liánjié fènggōng, jiēshòu rénmín jiāndū, wèi jiànshè fùqiáng, mínzhǔ, wénmíng, héxié de shèhuì zhǔyì guójiā nǔlì fèndòu!

Unofficial English translation:

I swear to be loyal to the Constitution of the People's Republic of China, to safeguard the authority of the Constitution, to fulfill my statutory duties, to be loyal to the motherland, be loyal to the people, to be dedicated to my duties, to be honest and upright, to accept the supervision of the people, and to strive for the building of a prosperous, democratic, civilized, and harmonious socialist country!

A revised version was used from 2018:

Chinese: "我宣誓：忠于中华人民共和国宪法，维护宪法权威，履行法定职责，忠于祖国、忠于人民，恪尽职守、廉洁奉公，接受人民监督，为建设富强、民主、文明、和谐、美丽的社会主义现代化强国努力奋斗！"; pinyin: Wǒ xuānshì: Zhōngyú zhōnghuá rénmín gònghéguó xiànfǎ, wéihù xiànfǎ quánwēi, lǚxíng fǎdìng zhízé, zhōngyú zǔguó, zhōngyú rénmín, kèjìnzhíshǒu, liánjié fènggōng, jiēshòu rénmín jiāndū, wèi jiànshè fùqiáng, mínzhǔ, wénmíng, héxié, měilì de shèhuì zhǔyì xiàndàihuà qiángguó nǔlì fèndòu!

Unofficial English translation:

I swear to be loyal to the Constitution of the People's Republic of China, to safeguard the authority of the Constitution, to fulfill my statutory duties, to be loyal to the motherland, be loyal to the people, to be dedicated to my duties, to be honest and upright, to accept the supervision of the people, and to strive for the building of a prosperous, democratic, civilized, harmonious, and beautiful modern socialist country!

== See also ==
- Chinese Communist Party Admission Oath
