= Great rejuvenation of the Chinese nation =

Chinese Communist Party slogan

The "great rejuvenation of the Chinese nation" (Note: 中华民族伟大复兴; Zhōnghuámínzú Wěidà Fùxīng) is a political slogan used by the Chinese Communist Party (CCP) regarding its stated goal of strengthening the Chinese nation. The term was first coined by CCP general secretary Jiang Zemin in 2001. CCP general secretary Xi Jinping tied the concept to the Chinese Dream, making the two concepts synonymous.

== History ==
Nationalist revolutionary Sun Yat-sen first proposed the concept of "rejuvenating China" (振兴中华). When the Chinese Communist Party was first founded, Li Dazhao, a CCP co-founder, proposed the "rejuvenation of the Chinese nation" (中华民族之复活). After the conclusion of the Chinese Civil War, Mao Zedong called to "make a great turnaround for the Chinese nation" (使中华民族来一个大翻身). After the 3rd plenary session of the 11th CCP Central Committee, Chinese leader Deng Xiaoping further developed the concept of the "rejuvenation of the Chinese nation" (振兴中华民族). The term "great rejuvenation of the Chinese nation" was first coined by CCP general secretary Jiang Zemin in a speech celebrating the 80th anniversary of the founding of the Chinese Communist Party in 2001. At the 16th Party National Congress in November 2002, the CCP officially adopted "realizing the great rejuvenation of the Chinese nation" as a goal.

Since coming into office in late 2012, CCP general secretary Xi Jinping linked the concept to the Chinese Dream, saying "realizing the great rejuvenation of the Chinese nation is the greatest dream of the Chinese nation in modern times." Since then, the two concepts have become synonymous and used interchangeably, and the CCP has promoted the term "realizing the Chinese Dream of the great rejuvenation of the Chinese nation" (实现中华民族伟大复兴的中国梦). According to Xi, the concept has been described as the overarching goal of the Chinese Communist Party by 2049, the 100th anniversary of the People's Republic of China. At the first session of the 13th National People's Congress on 11 March 2018, the preamble of the country's constitution was amended to include the term. In 2022, Xi described national rejuvenation as a "strategic plan" for "achieving lasting greatness for the Chinese nation".

== See also ==
- Ideology of the Chinese Communist Party
