= Party discipline =

Cohesion within a political party

The term party discipline is used in politics in two closely related, yet distinct, meanings. In a broad sense (also known as party cohesion), the discipline is adherence of the party members at large to an agreed system of political norms and rules. In a narrow sense, most pronounced under the Westminster model, the party discipline is an obligation of the members of parliament to vote along their party's line, with few exceptions. The deviations might be countered by consequences ("whipping") that are designed to ensure the relative cohesion of members of the respective party group.

== Typology ==
In order to maintain party discipline, given political parties usually appoint a party whip whose primary task it is to maintain party discipline and to ensure the given party members support the party on the floor of the legislature. In liberal democracies, party discipline commonly refers to the control that party leaders have over their caucus members in the legislature. Party discipline is important for all systems of government that allow parties to hold political power, as it can often be a determining factor in both the practical functionality of the government, as well as the efficient function of legitimate political process. Parliamentary groups can have discipline analogous to party discipline.

Breaking party discipline in both formal and informal settings may result in a number of consequences. Punishment for members who break party discipline largely varies on a case-to-case basis, but members may find themselves in a variety of positions from being internally demoted in the party to being expelled from the party itself. This results in there often being immense pressure for parliamentarians to compromise their beliefs if they conflict with the policy or decision that has been made by the parties leadership.

In order to maintain strict discipline and discourage behaviour such as floor crossing, which entails the given member leaving the party to join another caucus in the legislature, parties often offer a number of incentives to loyal members. These incentives also greatly vary on a case-to-case basis; examples include financial incentives and internal promotion within the party. There are, however, occasions in which members of a party are granted a conscience vote or free vote, in which party discipline is waived, and given members are free to vote to their individual preference.

This shared ideology is an essential and important part of party cohesion, and reinforcing the given shared ideology through methods such as party discipline is crucial to the ruling party's survival in government.

== Strong party discipline ==
Party discipline tends to vary largely depending on the type of governmental system of a given country.

=== In Marxism-Leninism ===
In Marxist–Leninist political systems, democratic centralism refers to strong party discipline with sanctions such as fines or expulsion from a communist party imposed on its members for disagreeing with the party.

"It is my will to join the Communist Party of China, uphold the Party's program, observe the provisions of the Party constitution, fulfill a Party member's duties, carry out the Party's decisions, strictly observe Party discipline, guard Party secrets, be loyal to the Party, work hard, fight for communism throughout my life, be ready at all times to sacrifice my all for the Party and the people, and never betray the Party."

— —Chinese Communist Party Admission Oath.

Other examples of even stronger party discipline include the French Section of the Workers' International and the French Communist Party which demand near absolute conformity to maintain party membership and good standing.

=== Other ===
Party discipline tends to be increasingly strong in countries that employ the Westminster parliamentary system, such as the United Kingdom, Canada, Australia, New Zealand. The Australian Labor Party, for example, requires absolute solidarity with caucus decisions. Apart from extremely rare examples of a conscience vote, voting against the decision of the caucus will result in expulsion from the party entirely if internal discussions fail to dissuade the member from crossing the floor. Even in parties with no such requirement like the conservative Liberal Party of Australia, discipline remains strong and defections against the party are very rare.

By convention, members of the government and shadow ministries are bound to vote as per the party room line and when they fail to do so, they are expected to resign or offer to resign from their ministry position. This results in a situation where crossing the floor as a Minister or Shadow Minister has become viewed as a lack of confidence in whoever the current leader happens to be. In 2026 this convention resulted in the split of the Liberal–National Coalition, after three Shadow Ministers from The Nationals party voted against laws in the wake of the 2025 Bondi Beach shooting despite the Coalition officially supporting them. Sussan Ley, the Leader of the Opposition but member of the Liberal Party of Australia, the senior partner in the Coalition, accepted their resignations. The situation rapidly escalated with all Nationals ministers resigning their positions, and on 22 January 2026, the full withdrawal of the Nationals from the Coalition, breaking it up.

In India, party discipline in regards to voting is strong enough that a vote by the legislature against the government is understood, by convention, to cause the government to "collapse". Party leaders in such governments also often have the authority to expel members of the party who violate the party line.

Within the United Kingdom, the devolved Scottish Parliament uses the mixed member proportionality system of voting and so party discipline tends to be high. That is especially true for list MPs, who do not represent an electorate; (as if they do not vote along the party line) they risk staunch discipline. However research does show that proportional voting systems do result in constituent representatives engaging more with their respective ridings while regional (list) MP's often spend more time legislating.

== Weaker party discipline ==
Weak party discipline is usually more frequent in parties of notables and elite parties than in populist parties. The centrist Radical-Socialist Party and the right-wing parties during the French Third Republic (1871–1940) all had little to no party discipline.

In the United States, the modern Democratic Party and Republican Party both have relatively weaker party discipline in contrast to Westminsters system. That is aptly illustrated by the vote on the federal Justice Against Sponsors of Terrorism Act, in which the only senator to vote against overriding President Barack Obama's veto was the retiring Democratic minority leader Harry Reid. This can also be seen in Republican failures to repeal Obamacare and the general power wielded by senators with a pivotal vote, such as Joe Manchin and Kyrsten Sinema during the 117th Congress. This looser degree of party discipline in the United States is part due to the structure of the federal presidential republic government which by design enables elected representatives to exercise an increased degree of autonomy as opposed to the Westminster system of parliamentary democracy.

Party discipline weakened to a degree in the United Kingdom during Brexit under Theresa May with only a slim majority and intra-party divisions between hard Brexiteers and soft or anti Brexiters; and post 2019 under Boris Johnson (though Johnson has a large majority, making backbench dissent less of a difficulty). An independent evaluation found that MPs in the Canadian House of Commons voted the party line 99.6 percent of the time between 2015 and 2019. Canadian MP's also face intense pressure to toe the line when making public remarks inside and outside the legislature.

In Italy, party discipline or group discipline as it is referred to is required by the statutes of parliamentary groups. This group discipline has registered an oscillation from strong to weak over the years, defined as a pendulum, depending on the political phase of the government.

In Australia the electoral conditions can result in candidates from one of the minor parties or a microparty, elected to government with extremely small vote numbers. Discipline in these small parties is often non-existent and often results in the elected member leaving to sit as an independent. An example of this is Jacqui Lambie, who won election to the federal senate in 2013 with the Palmer United Party, then quit to start a microparty under her own name only four months later, winning another term after a double dissolution. Following an eligibility issue she was forced to resign in late 2017 due to her British citizenship. Australian law requires the replacement to be from the same party and so she was replaced by Steven Martin. Martin then refused to resign himself, which would have allowed Lambie to return. He was expelled from the Lambie party, sitting as an independent before joining the Tasmanian Nationals.

== Increasing levels of party discipline and party cohesion in the 21st century ==
Party discipline has become increasingly important in the Twenty-First Century due in part to the rise of instant communication. The rise of digital media combined with global hyper-political polarization has caused parties to maintain not only strict party discipline but even stricter message discipline; which has become increasingly important in order to present a strong sense of cohesion. Strict party discipline allows political parties to maintain control over the entire respective party caucus and ensure that the party's agenda is placed above all else.

=== The brand ambassador phenomenon ===
Increasing levels of party discipline in liberal democracy have often seen the majority of low-ranking elected party members become simple brand ambassadors whose overarching duty is to represent the values of the larger party. While the brand ambassador phenomenon does work to ensure the smooth operation of democracy, it also has several criticism, such as the oppression of dissenting opinions. This oppression of dissenting opinions sees the creation of a virtual barrier for free thinkers. Perspective party members who may vary from political norms in terms of sex, race or gender identity are thus placed at odds with party officials who may view this deviation from the norm as a threat to party cohesion.

This proverbial prohibition of those who deviate from the norm in establishment politics includes its tendency to suppress the representation of women and minority members of the party. Research from a variety of global legislatures has indicated that parties tend to only select women and minorities who are extremely partisan loyal. Parties also often systemically weed out members they deem to be a threat to party conformity. Examples of this behaviour include the expulsion of former attorney general Jody Wilson-Raybould from the Liberal Party of Canada in response to her pursuit of criminal proceedings in the SNC Lavalin scandal.

Parties often view minority candidates as simple brand ambassadors that check social diversity quotas which has been shown to impair these members from ever doing anything substantive. This, in turn, negatively correlates with the prioritization of women and other minority rights. This negative correlation can be seen to drastic effect in the practice of sacrificial lambs in electoral politics.

== Party discipline by country ==
=== Canada ===
Canadian parliaments have seen an especially drastic rise in party discipline over the past 100 years. In the early 1900s, just 20 percent of elected MPs voted with their respective party 100 percent of the time. The past ten years, however, has seen MPs vote against their party less than 1 percent of the time. This mass conformity has had a drastic effect on Canadian elections, with just 4 to 5 percent of Canadians listing the actual candidate as prioritization in elections. Furthermore, statistics show that voter opinions of local candidates matter in less than 15 percent of elections. Thus Canada has become widely regarded as the parliamentary democracy with the most stringent party discipline. This, in turn, has led to frustration among many Canadian voters who feel their elected representative is no more than a simple brand ambassador.

==== Concerns over presidentialization of parliamentary systems ====
This stringent discipline in the Canadian system has, in turn, played a part in what is deemed the presidentialization of the Westminster parliamentary system. The Canadian system has come to possess many characteristics of presidential systems without any of the formal attributes. The position of the Canadian prime minister has seen an increasing level of power which has resulted in the position becoming arguably more powerful than some actual presidential systems.

==== Party discipline in the reformed Canadian Senate ====
The 2015 reforms to Canadian senate sought to increase independence, ideological diversity, and encouraging the exercising of formal powers, by eliminating political parties in the senate. While party discipline has been somewhat loosened, it has not really been effectively loosened as appointees are still likely to follow respective party policy and rhetoric. While senators are now officially unaffiliated with political parties research has shown that they still to tend to largely vote along the same ideological party lines as before. While more time is needed to study the implemented reforms' effects, initial data shows that the reforms have been largely ineffective and have actually negatively impacted regional representation.

== See also ==
- Crossing the floor
- Party switching
- Purity test (politics)
- Conscience vote
- Sacrificial lamb

== Sources ==
- Chadwick, R. (2012). "Party Discipline and Loyalty". Encyclopedia of Applied Ethics. Elsevier Science. ISBN 978-0-12-373932-2.
- Depauw, Sam; Martin, Shane (2008). "Legislative party discipline and cohesion in comparative perspective" (PDF). Intra-Party Politics and Coalition Governments. Taylor & Francis. ISBN 9780203889220.
- Eggleston, Stephen David (1988). Party cohesion in the early post-Confederation period. University of British Columbia (MA thesis). doi:10.14288/1.0097707.
- Kam, Christopher J. (26 March 2009). Party Discipline and Parliamentary Politics. Cambridge University Press. doi:10.1017/cbo9780511576614. ISBN 978-0-521-51829-1.
- Kam, Christopher (1 January 2014). "Party Discipline". The Oxford Handbook of Legislative Studies. Oxford University Press. pp. 399–417. doi:10.1093/oxfordhb/9780199653010.013.0020. ISBN 978-0-19-965301-0.
- Kurian, G.T.; Schultz, J.D. (1997). The Encyclopedia of the Democratic Party. Sharpe Reference. ISBN 978-1-56324-729-3.
- Olson, D.M. (2015). "Party Discipline". Democratic Legislative Institutions: A Comparative View. Taylor & Francis. ISBN 978-1-317-47314-5.
