= Socialist market economy =

Chinese economic philosophy

- Simplified Chinese: 社会主义市场经济
- Traditional Chinese: 社會主義市場經濟
Transcriptions
Standard Mandarin
- Hanyu Pinyin: Shèhuìzhǔyì Shìchǎng Jīngjì

The socialist market economy (SME) is the economic system and model of economic development employed in the People's Republic of China. The system is a market economy with the predominance of public ownership and state-owned enterprises. The term "socialist market economy" was introduced by Jiang Zemin during the 14th National Congress of the Chinese Communist Party (CCP) in 1992 to describe the goal of the reform and opening up.

Originating in the reform and opening up initiated in 1978 that integrated China into the global market economy, the socialist market economy represents a preliminary or "primary stage" of developing socialism. It is officially described as an economic system in which the market plays a decisive role in resource allocation under the macro-control of the socialist state. Some commentators describe the system as a form of "state capitalism", while others describe it as an original evolution of Marxism, in line with Marxism–Leninism similar to the "New Economic Policy" of the Soviet Union, adapted to the cohabitation with a globalized capitalist system.

== History ==
Marxism holds that, within the contradictions between the productive forces and relations of production, between practice and theory, and between the economic base and the super-structure, the productive forces…and the economic base generally play a principal and decisive role. Whoever denies this is not a materialist.

— Deng Xiaoping, "On the General Program of Work for the Whole Party and the Whole Nation" (1975)

After the Great Leap Forward (1958–1961) and the ousting of the Gang of Four from power in 1976, then-paramount leader Deng Xiaoping refocused China's efforts on economic growth and on finding an economic system compatible with China's specific conditions. However, in doing so he remained committed to the Leninist model of centralized political control and a one-party state. Deng and the CCP leadership rejected the prior Maoist emphasis on culture and political agency as the driving forces behind economic progress and started to place a greater emphasis on advancing the material productive forces as the fundamental and necessary prerequisite for building an advanced socialist society. The adoption of market reforms was seen to be consistent with China's level of development and a necessary step in advancing the productive forces of society. This aligned Chinese policy with a more traditional Marxist perspective where a fully developed socialist planned economy can only come into existence after a market economy has exhausted its historical role and gradually transforms itself into a planned economy, nudged by technological advances that make economic planning possible and therefore market relations less necessary. In Deng's view, both state planning and market mechanisms were tools to liberate productivity, and that while a capitalist market economy is dominated by individualism, a socialist market economy would lead to common prosperity.

The transition to a socialist market economy began in 1978 when Deng Xiaoping introduced his program of socialism with Chinese characteristics. Initial reforms in decollectivizing agriculture and opening the economy to foreign investment in the late 1970s and early 1980s later led to large-scale radical reforms, including corporatization of the state sector, partial privatization of some enterprises, liberalization of trade and prices and dismantling of the "iron rice bowl" system of job security in the late 1990s. With the backing of the reformist general secretary, Hu Yaobang, and Premier Zhao Ziyang, the third plenum of the 12th CCP Central Committee officially adopted the concept of a "planned commodity economy" (Chinese: 有计划的商品经济; pinyin: Yǒu jìhuà de shāngpǐn jīngjì).

During his 1992 southern tour, Deng promoted the ideological basis for the socialist market economy, stating his view that "[p]lanned economy does not equal socialism and market economy does not equal capitalism. Socialism can have market mechanisms as well, and government planning and market are both economic means." Jiang Zemin originally introduced the term "socialist market economy" in 1992. He had coined the idea so that China could learn the lessons from capitalist countries without needing to discuss if the reforms are "socialist" or "capitalist". Jiang had asked Deng Xiaoping if he had approved of the term, which he did. The Đổi Mới in Vietnam later adopted the concept. Following its implementation, this economic system has supplemented the command economy in the People's Republic of China, with high growth-rates in GDP during the past decades having been attributed to it. Within this model, privately owned enterprises have become a major component of the economic system alongside the central state-owned enterprises and the collective/township village enterprises.

At the first session of the 8th National People's Congress on 29 March 1993, the preamble of the Constitution of China was amended to incorporate the system. In 1993, the CCP issued its "Decision on Issues Related to the Establishment of a Socialist Market Economy System." In the wave of reform thereafter, one goal was to separate SOE management from government and to empower a select group of SOEs with special property rights and autonomy. In 1994, China devalued the renminbi by 33 percent as part of socialist market economy reforms. After adoption of the socialist market economy, agricultural production increased significantly and China eliminated starvation.

== Content ==
The socialist market economy is officially described as an "economic system in which the market plays a decisive role in resource allocation under the macro-control of the socialist state". It is described by the CCP as an early stage in the development of socialism (this stage is variously called the "primary" or "preliminary" stage of socialism), where public ownership coexists alongside a diverse range of non-public forms of ownership. At the Third Plenary Session of the 18th Central Committee in November 2013, the party revised its formulation of the market's function, from the "basic role" in resource allocation used in party documents since 1992 to a "decisive role". In his explanation of the decision, Xi Jinping stated that the market would play "a decisive role in the allocation of resources, but by no means... a total role", alongside the "active role of the Party and the Government".

In the CCP's view, China is not a capitalist country because despite the co-existence of private capitalists and entrepreneurs with public and collective enterprise, the state holds a monopoly on all land ownership and a primary ownership stake in the economy's largest and strategic enterprises, while the party retains control over the state and the direction of the country. However, many scholars consider the Chinese economic model as an example of authoritarian capitalism, state capitalism or party-state capitalism.

Proponents of this economic model distinguish it from market socialism as market socialists believe that economic planning is unattainable, undesirable or ineffective and thus view the market as an integral part of socialism whereas proponents of the socialist market economy view markets as a temporary phase in development of a fully planned economy.

== Characteristics ==
=== Enterprise and ownership types ===
Public ownership in the socialist market economy consists of state-owned assets, collectively owned enterprises, and the publicly owned shares of mixed enterprises. These various forms of public ownership dominate the socialist market economy alongside substantial private and foreign enterprises.

The principles of the socialist market economy legitimized the idea that ownership of state-owned enterprises could be structured in various forms, including majority state-owned joint stock companies. There are a few major forms of state-owned enterprises in China today:

- State-owned enterprises: commercial enterprises established by either the central government or a local government, where managers are appointed by the government or public bodies. This category only includes wholly state-funded and managed firms. Most state-owned enterprises are not entities of the central government. Central government state-owned enterprises are subunits of the State-owned Assets Supervision and Administration Commission (SASAC).
- State-holding enterprises: state-holding, or state-controlled enterprises, are publicly listed firms where the state owns a large share or a controlling share within the firms, thereby exerting influence on the management of the firm. These include firms that receive foreign direct investment.
- State joint ownership enterprises

=== State sector ===
The socialist market economy consists of a wide range of state-owned enterprises (SOEs) representing one form of public ownership. As of the end of 2019, China's SOEs represented 4.5% of the global economy. State-owned enterprises accounted for over 60% of China's market capitalization in 2019 and generated 40% of China's GDP of US$15.97 trillion (101.36 trillion yuan) in 2020, with domestic and foreign private businesses and investment accounting for the remaining 60%. Ninety-one (91) of these SOEs belong to the 2020 Fortune Global 500 companies.

Beginning with the 1978 reforms, in the 1980s during the industrial reforms, state enterprises were gradually corporatized and transformed into joint-stock corporations with the state retaining either full or majority ownership of their shares. By the early 2000s, most major SOEs in non-strategic sectors were listed on the Shanghai and Hong Kong stock exchanges and some SOEs adopted mixed ownership structures where the central government and various other state entities—including state banks, other SOEs, provincial and local governments—own varying degrees of the firm's listed shares alongside foreign and private shareholders. The result has been a highly diffuse form of public ownership where various government entities, agencies, and other state-owned enterprises own state-owned enterprises. This makes gauging the true size and scope of the state sector difficult, particularly when SOEs with mixed ownership structures are considered. In 2013, the public sector accounted for 30% of the number of firms in China, but 55% of assets, 45% of revenue, and 40% of profits.

In 1996, China implemented a comprehensive series of industrial reforms termed "Grasping the large, letting go of the small". These reforms involved closing unprofitable state enterprises, merging smaller enterprises, and privatizing other small-to-medium enterprises. Centrally owned SOEs were reformed into joint-stock companies with the aim of delegating more authority to SOE managers. SOEs at all levels shifted their primary focus to profitability and shed their social welfare function of providing social services and benefits to their workers in what was known as the "Iron Rice Bowl" system. The State-owned Assets Supervision and Administration Commission (SASAC) was formed in 2003 to oversee the management of the large centrally owned state enterprises.

Modern SOEs are operationally very different from those in the 1990s. SOEs are much larger in size and fewer in number, with central government-owned SOEs clustered in "strategic sectors" including banking, finance, mining, energy, transportation, telecommunications, and public utilities. By comparison, provincial and municipal level SOEs number in the thousands and are involved in almost every industry, including information technology and automobile design and production. State sector reform is an ongoing process in China. As of 2017, the CCP has rejected the Singapore model of Temasek-style state investment companies for China's SOEs, where SOEs operate solely to maximize profits on a commercial basis. In particular, China maintains that centrally owned SOEs also pursue national and industrial policy objectives. As a result of recent reforms to increase profitability and unload debt, the government reported the profits of central government-owned SOEs rose by 15.2% in 2017.

Despite becoming increasingly profitable, SOEs in China have not paid dividends to the state, causing some analysts to question the rationale for public ownership in the first place. As part of SASAC's ongoing reforms, SOEs will now be encouraged and required to pay a higher portion of their profits as dividends to the state, with some state-owned assets being transferred to social security funds to help finance pensions for China's aging population. This is part of a broader reform effort of restructuring the state sector to become a source of finance for public services. As part of the SOE reform goals outlined in 2015 by SASAC, SOEs are to be classified as either commercial or public service entities, with the former being required to distribute a higher proportion of their profits as dividends. Dividend payments are set to rise from 5–15% to 30% by 2020.

=== Private sector ===
Privately owned enterprises (POEs) are recognized as one of the components of the socialist market economy alongside state, collective, and individually owned enterprises. The private sector has played an increasingly large role since adopting the 1994 Company Law. Additionally, the boundary between public and private enterprises has blurred in China as many publicly listed firms are under mixed ownership by various state and non-state entities. Additionally, private sector firms that operate in industries targeted for growth often receive favorable loans and preferential government treatment, while SOEs in non-strategic sectors might be exempt from subsidies. As an example, ZTE Corporation is a majority state-owned enterprise that was forced to rely on equity markets, whereas its employee-owned private sector competitor Huawei is viewed as a "national champion" and therefore received major state funding from state banks. Like their state-owned counterparts, POEs are expected to follow state policies and are subject to CCP control, suggesting that the distinction between public and private ownership is not a meaningful distinction to make for understanding China's economic model. As of 2015, state control and state-directed development (in both public and private sectors) are the overriding features of the Chinese economic system that play a more substantial role than the public ownership of assets.

While the private sector has been accorded a role in the socialist market economy and has greatly increased in size and scope since the 1990s, the private sector does not dominate the Chinese economy. The exact size of the private sector is difficult to determine in part because private enterprises may have a minority of their stock owned by state entities and because of different classification standards used for classifying enterprises. For example, in the first quarter of 2016, the National Bureau of Statistics of China reported fixed investment by private firms at 35%, and by wholly state-owned SOEs at 27%, with the bulk of the remainder belonging to non-wholly state-funded limited liability corporations.

=== Economic planning ===
The 1993 CCP decision overhauled the organization of China's planning apparatus. Planning was not abolished, but instead reframed as one of three key mechanisms of macro-economic control, along with fiscal policy and monetary policy. Chinese administrators were instructed to plan for markets and to absorb major market trends (both domestically and internationally) into multi-year government programs. In 2003, the State Planning Commission was reformed into the National Development and Reform Commission. Indicative planning and industrial policies have substituted material balance planning and play a substantial role in guiding the market economy for both the state and private sectors. The planning system consists of three layers, each using a different planning mechanism.

Compulsory planning is limited to state-owned enterprises operating in strategic sectors, including research, education, and infrastructure development plans. Compulsory planning outlines targeted outcomes and the supply of raw materials and financial resources needed. Contractual planning sets objectives and the overall means of achieving these goals, and then negotiates with enterprises and local governments to establish detailed objectives and how resources are to be allocated to the targeted sectors. Indicative planning operates at the lowest level of the planning system, where the government outlines industrial targets and then uses market instruments (tax exemptions, subsidies, and favorable bank loans) to induce firms in the targeted industry to meet these targets.

== Analysis ==
Some scholars have described China's economic system as a form of state capitalism, particularly after the industrial reforms of the 1980s and 1990s, noting that while the Chinese economy maintains a large state sector, the state-owned enterprises operate like private-sector firms and retain all profits without remitting them to the government to benefit the entire population. This model brings into question the rationale for widespread public ownership as well as the applicability of the descriptor "socialist", and has led to concern and debate regarding the distribution of state profits. Others have labeled it "party-state capitalism".

Chinese economist Cui Zhiyuan argues that James Meade's model of liberal socialism is similar to China's socialist market economy and can be used to make sense of the model. Meade's model of market socialism involved public ownership of firms with independent management, with the state acting as a residual claimant to the profits generated by its enterprises, but without exercising control rights over the management and operations of its firms. This model has the advantage that the state would have a source of income independent of taxation and debt, enabling a reduction of the tax burden on individual incomes and the private sector while promoting greater equality. Cui points to the Chongqing experience with municipal state-owned enterprises, enabling high social expenditure alongside low taxes and extremely high growth rates as validation of the socialist market economy model. The Chongqing model used state enterprise profits to fund public services (including housing), providing the main source of public finance and enabling Chongqing to lower its corporate tax rate (15% compared to the 33% national corporate tax rate) to attract foreign investment.

Julan Du and Chenggang Xu analyzed the Chinese model in a 2005 paper to assess whether it represents a type of market socialism or capitalism. They concluded that China's contemporary economic system represents a form of capitalism rather than market socialism because: (1) financial markets exist which permit private share ownership—a feature absent in the economic literature on market socialism; and (2) state profits are retained by enterprises rather than being distributed among the population in a social dividend or similar scheme, which are central features in most models of market socialism. Du and Xu concluded that China is not a market socialist economy, but an unstable form of capitalism.

Another analysis carried out by the Global Studies Association at the DePaul University in 2006 reports that the Chinese economic system does not constitute a form of socialism when socialism is defined as a planned economy where production for use has replaced production for profit as the driving force behind economic activity, or when socialism is defined as a system where the working class is the dominant class which controls the surplus value produced by the economy. The Chinese economy also does not constitute socialism in the sense of widespread self-management or workplace democracy. The study concluded that, as of 2006, capitalism is not the dominant mode of organization, either, and China instead has a partially pre-capitalist agrarian system with almost 50% of its population engaged in agricultural work.

In 2015, Curtis J. Milhaupt and Wentong Zheng classified China's economic system as state capitalism because the state directs and guides all major aspects of the Chinese economy—including both the state and private sectors—while not collecting dividends from the ownership of its enterprises. They noted that Chinese state-owned and privately owned enterprises shared many similarities regarding state subsidies, proximity to state power, and execution of government policy objectives. Within the state sector, the emphasis was more on government control than on the ownership of assets.

Proponents of the socialist market economy compare it to the New Economic Policy in 1920s Soviet Russia that introduced market-oriented reforms while maintaining state-ownership of the commanding heights of the economy. The reforms are justified as socialist through the belief that changing conditions necessitate new strategies for socialist development.

According to Li Rongrong, in 2003 the chairman of the State-Owned Assets Supervision and Administration Commission of the State Council, China's socialist economic system is underpinned by the foundational role of public enterprise:

Public ownership, as the foundation of the socialist economic system, is a basic force of the state to guide and promote economic and social development and a major guarantee for realising the fundamental interests and the common prosperity of the majority of the people… The state owned economy has taken a dominant place in major trades that have a close bearing on the country's economic lifeline and key areas, and has propped-up, guided and brought along the development of the entire socio-economy. The influence and control capacity of SOEs have further increased. State owned economy has played an irreplaceable role in China's socialist modernisation drive.

In his analysis of whether socialist market economy approaches would be suitable to Cuba, Fidel Castro contended that China's approach would not work for Cuba because China's socialist market economy approach benefitted from factors lacking in Cuba: China's large size and global economic importance, significant geographic distance from the United States, and a domestic market that could attract foreign investment, including from the United States.

Other Marxist analyses point out that because the Chinese economic system is based on commodity production, has a role for private capital, and disempowers the working class, it represents a capitalist economy. Classical Marxists believe a socialist commodity economy (or a socialist market economy) is contradictory. Other socialists believe the Chinese have embraced many elements of market capitalism, specifically commodity production and privatization, resulting in a full-blown capitalist economic system. In the past, although many enterprises were nominally publicly owned, the profits were retained by the enterprises and used to pay managers excessively high salaries rather than being distributed amongst the population. In 2020, the "commanding role" of the CCP over SOEs was cemented in law and SOEs have been required to have Staff and Worker Representative Congresses (SWRCs), a form of workplace democracy, with 80% of registered companies in China having them, including some private sector companies.

Cui Zhiyuan traces the theoretical foundations of the socialist market economy to James Meade's model of liberal socialism in which the state acts as a residual claimant on the profits generated by state-owned enterprises that are operated independent of government management. Writing for English-language readers, academics Christopher Marquis and Kunyuan Qiao state that to avoid the incorrect assumption that "market economy" is the core idea, a more appropriate translation would be "market economy within the Chinese socialist system." In Marquis and Qiao's view, this alternative translation better reflects the subordination of "market" to "socialist system".

== See also ==
- Reform and opening up
- Cooperative
- Dirigism
- East Asian model of capitalism
- Economy of China
- Free market
- Mixed economy
- Party-state capitalism
- Socialism in one country
- Socialist-oriented market economy
- State capitalism
