= Second session of the 13th National People's Congress =

2019 National People's Congress; 第十三届全国人民代表大会第二次会议; _{2nd plenary session of the}; _{13th National People's Congress}; 8 March – 20 March
President	Premier	Congress Chairman
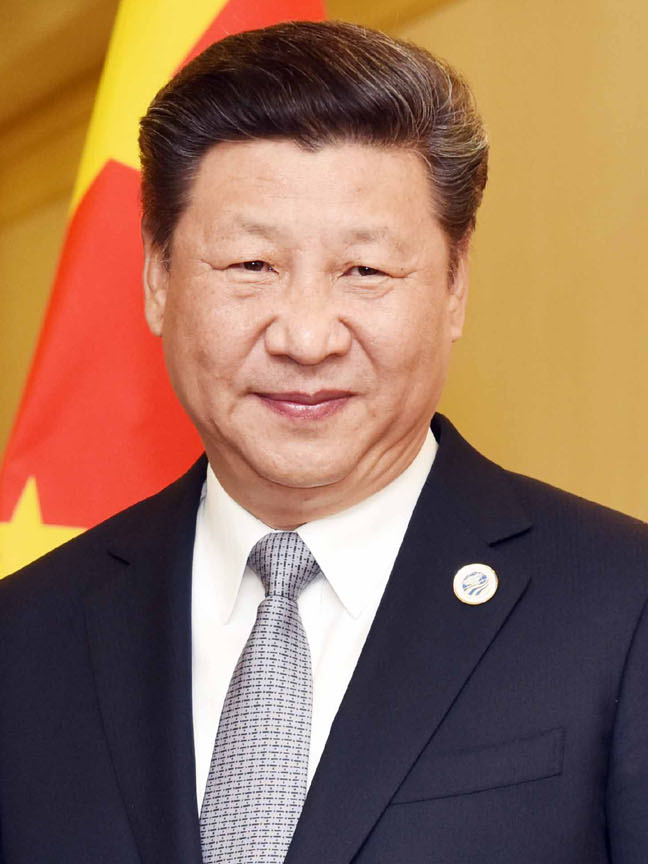
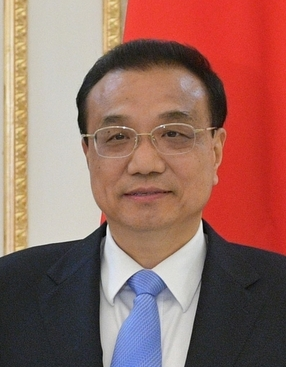
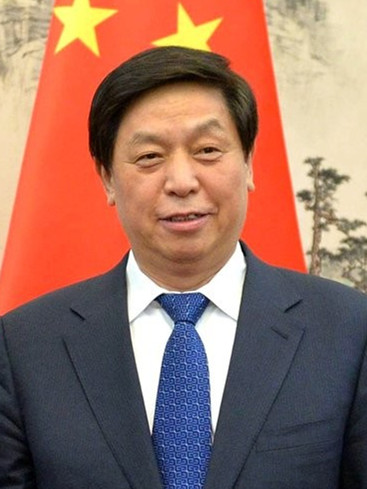
Xi Jinping	Li Keqiang	Li Zhanshu
since 17 March 2018	since 18 March 2018	since 17 March 2018

Website
- http://www.npc.gov.cn/englishnpc/Special_13_1/index.htm

The second session of the 13th National People's Congress was held in March 2019 at the Great Hall of the People in Beijing, China. The session opened on 8 March and concluded on 20 March.

== The session ==
The work report of the 13th National People's Congress Standing Committee was delivered by Li Zhanshu, chairman of the Standing Committee of the National People's Congress. The explanation on the draft foreign investment law during the meeting was delivered by Wang Chen, vice chairman of the National People's Congress (NPC) Standing Committee.

In Premier Li's work report, the 2019 GDP growth target was lowered to a 6-6.5 per cent range due to the US-China trade war, an already high debt level and financing bottlenecks for private enterprises. Among the solutions suggested in Li's report included tax and fees cuts, stabilisation of employment and more social services. The Premier's report was approved with 2,945 votes in favour and three abstentions.

The NPC announced a defense budget spending increase of 7.5%.

== Voting results ==
=== Resolutions ===
Topic	For	Against	Abstain	Rate
Premier Li Keqiang's Government Work Report	2,945	0	2	99.90%
Foreign Investment Law	2,929	8	8	99.46%
Report on the Implementation of the 2018 National Economic and Social Development Plan and the 2019 Draft Plan	2,911	23	14	97.68%
Report on the Execution of the Central and Local Budgets for 2018 and on the Draft Central and Local Budgets for 2019	2,867	46	34	96.21%
Chairman Li Zhanshu's NPCSC Work Report	2,909	19	17	98.68%
Chief Justice Zhou Qiang's Supreme People's Court Work Report	2,725	156	67	92.44%
Procurator-General Zhang Jun's Supreme People's Procuratorate Work Report	2,843	71	31	97.72%
Resignation of Zhang Rongshun from the NPCSC	2,909	12	23	98.68%

Preceded by 2018 NPC	Annual National People's Congress Sessions of the People's Republic of China; March 2020	Succeeded by 2020 NPC
