= System of multi-party cooperation and political consultation =

Chinese Communist Party principle

System of Multi-party Cooperation and Political Consultation under the Leadership of the Chinese Communist Party
- Simplified Chinese: 中国共产党领导的多党合作和政治协商制度
- Traditional Chinese: 中國共產黨領導的多黨合作與政治協商制度
Transcriptions
Standard Mandarin
- Hanyu Pinyin: Zhōngguó Gòngchǎndǎng Lǐngdǎode Duōdǎng Hézuò hé Zhèngzhì Xiéshāng Zhìdù

Alternative Chinese name
- Simplified Chinese: 政治协商制度
- Traditional Chinese: 政治協商制度
Transcriptions
Standard Mandarin
- Hanyu Pinyin: Zhèngzhì Xiéshāng Zhìdù

The system of multi-party cooperation and political consultation under the leadership of the Chinese Communist Party is the official term for the political party system of the People's Republic of China. According to this system, the Chinese Communist Party (CCP) is the sole ruling party, with eight minor non-oppositional political parties permitted by the CCP to exist.

== History ==
Chinese leader Deng Xiaoping previously used the term "system of multiparty cooperation under the leadership of the CCP." The CCP Central Committee issued a document titled the "Opinions of the CCP Central Committee on Upholding and Improving the Multi-Party Cooperation and Political Consultation System under the Leadership of the Chinese Communist Party" at the end of 1989, incorporating "political consultation" to the system. The drafting of the document began at the beginning of 1989 based on Deng Xiaoping's instructions on a proposal put forward by a member of a minor party. At the first session of the 8th National People's Congress on 29 March 1993, the preamble of country's constitution was amended to incorporate the system. In February 2005, the CCP Central Committee under Hu Jintao released the Central Committee issued the "Opinions of the CCP Central Committee on Further Strengthening the Building of the System of MultiParty Cooperation and Consultation Under the Leadership of the CCP", which promoted the view that the CCP consult more with the minor parties, submit major policies to the CPPCC before adoption, and respect their views.

== Definition ==
According to the 1982 state constitution, "The system of multiparty cooperation and political consultation under the leadership of the Communist Party of China will continue and develop long into the future". The system means that the CCP "is the only party in power in the People's Republic of China" and that the eight minor political parties can participate in the "discussion and management of state affairs" with the precondition of accepting CCP's leadership.

According to the state-run media agency China Internet Information Center, consultation takes place under the leadership of the CCP, with mass organizations, the minor parties, and "representatives from all walks of life". These consultations contribute, at least in theory, to the formation of the country's basic policy in the fields of political, economic, cultural and social affairs. Officially, the CCP's relationship with other parties is based on the principle of "long-term coexistence and mutual supervision, treating each other with full sincerity and sharing weal or woe." This process is institutionalized in the Chinese People's Political Consultative Conference (CPPCC), which serves as the institutional form of political consultation.
