= 1993 amendment to the Constitution of China =

Amendment to the Constitution of the People's Republic of China

National People's Congress
- Territorial extent: China
- Passed by: National People's Congress
- Passed: 29 March 1993
- Effective: 29 March 1993

Codification
- Acts amended: Constitution of the People's Republic of China
- Introduced by: Standing Committee of the National People's Congress
- Voting summary: 2,848 voted for; 8 voted against; 36 abstained
- Status: In force

The Amendment to the Constitution of the People's Republic of China was proposed by the 14th Central Committee of the Chinese Communist Party and adopted at the second session of the 8th National People's Congress on 29 March 1993.

The amendments incorporated socialist market economy and system of multi-party cooperation and political consultation to the constitution.

== History ==
On 14 February, the CCP Central Committee submitted the "Proposal of the Central Committee of the Chinese Communist Party on Amending Part of the Constitution" to the Standing Committee of the National People's Congress. On 22 February, the thirtieth session of the Standing Committee of the 7th National People's Congress passed the "Draft Constitutional Amendment" based on the central government's constitutional amendment proposal, and decided to submit it to the first session of the 8th National People's Congress for deliberation. On 14 March, the Central Committee submitted the “Supplementary Proposal of the CPC Central Committee on Amending Some Contents of the Constitution” to the Presidium of the first session of the 8th National People's Congress. Because it did not comply with the constitutional amendment procedure, at the suggestion of the Jiusan Society, 2,383 representatives resubmitted it to the Presidium.

On 23 March, 2,383 deputies proposed supplementary amendments to the "Draft Constitutional Amendment" based on the supplementary suggestions of the Central Committee. After a vote, the Presidium merged the draft constitutional amendment originally proposed by the NPCSC and the supplementary amendments proposed by the deputies into a new draft constitutional amendment, which was submitted to the delegations for deliberation. On 29 March, the first session of the 8th National People's Congress passed the Constitutional Amendment with 2,848 votes in favor, 8 votes against, and 36 abstentions.

== Amendments ==
The amendment affected most of the articles and preamble of the Constitution, as well as the election of local people's congress representatives. The term socialist market economy was formally incorporated, and system of multi-party cooperation and political consultation to the preamble of the constitution.
