= 2018 amendment to the Constitution of China =

2018 constitutional amendments

Amendment to the Constitution of the People's Republic of China

National People's Congress
- Territorial extent: China
- Passed by: National People's Congress
- Passed: 11 March 2018
- Effective: 11 March 2018

Codification
- Acts amended: Constitution of the People's Republic of China
- Introduced by: Standing Committee of the National People's Congress
- Committee responsible: Legislative Affairs Commission
- Voting summary: 2,958 voted for; 2 voted against; 3 abstained
- Status: In force

The Amendment to the Constitution of the People's Republic of China was proposed by the 19th Central Committee of the Chinese Communist Party on 26 January 2018 and adopted at the first session of the 13th National People's Congress on 11 March 2018. This was the fifth amendment to the 1982 constitution, as well as the first since the 2004 amendment, and included 21 articles. Significant changes including granting local legislative power to cities with districts, establishing the National Supervisory Commission and establishing a constitutional oath of office. The amendment removed the restriction that the president and vice president could not serve more than two consecutive terms, which eventually allowed Xi Jinping to be elected to an unprecedented third term in 2023. Additionally, the Chinese Communist Party's leadership over the country was written into the main body of the constitution.

== History ==
On 29 September 2017, CCP General Secretary Xi Jinping chaired a meeting of the Politburo of the Chinese Communist Party and decided to launch the constitutional amendment work. To this end, a constitutional amendment group to carry out work under the leadership of the Politburo Standing Committee was created, with Zhang Dejiang as the group leader and Li Zhanshu and Wang Huning as deputy group leaders. On 27 December, Xi Jinping chaired a meeting of the Politburo and decided to convene the second plenary session of the 19th CCP Central Committee in January 2018 to discuss and study proposals for amending the constitution.

From January 18 to 19, 2018, the second plenary session of the 19th Central Committee was held. The plenary session reviewed and approved the "Proposal of the Central Committee of the Chinese Communist Party on Amending Some Contents of the Constitution". On January 26, the Central Committee submitted the proposal to the Standing Committee of the National People's Congress. On January 30, the thirty second session of the Standing Committee of the 12th National People's Congress unanimously passed the "Draft Amendment to the Constitution of the People's Republic of China" drafted on the basis of the Central Committee's constitutional amendment proposal, and decided to submit it to the first session of the 13th National People's Congress for deliberation.

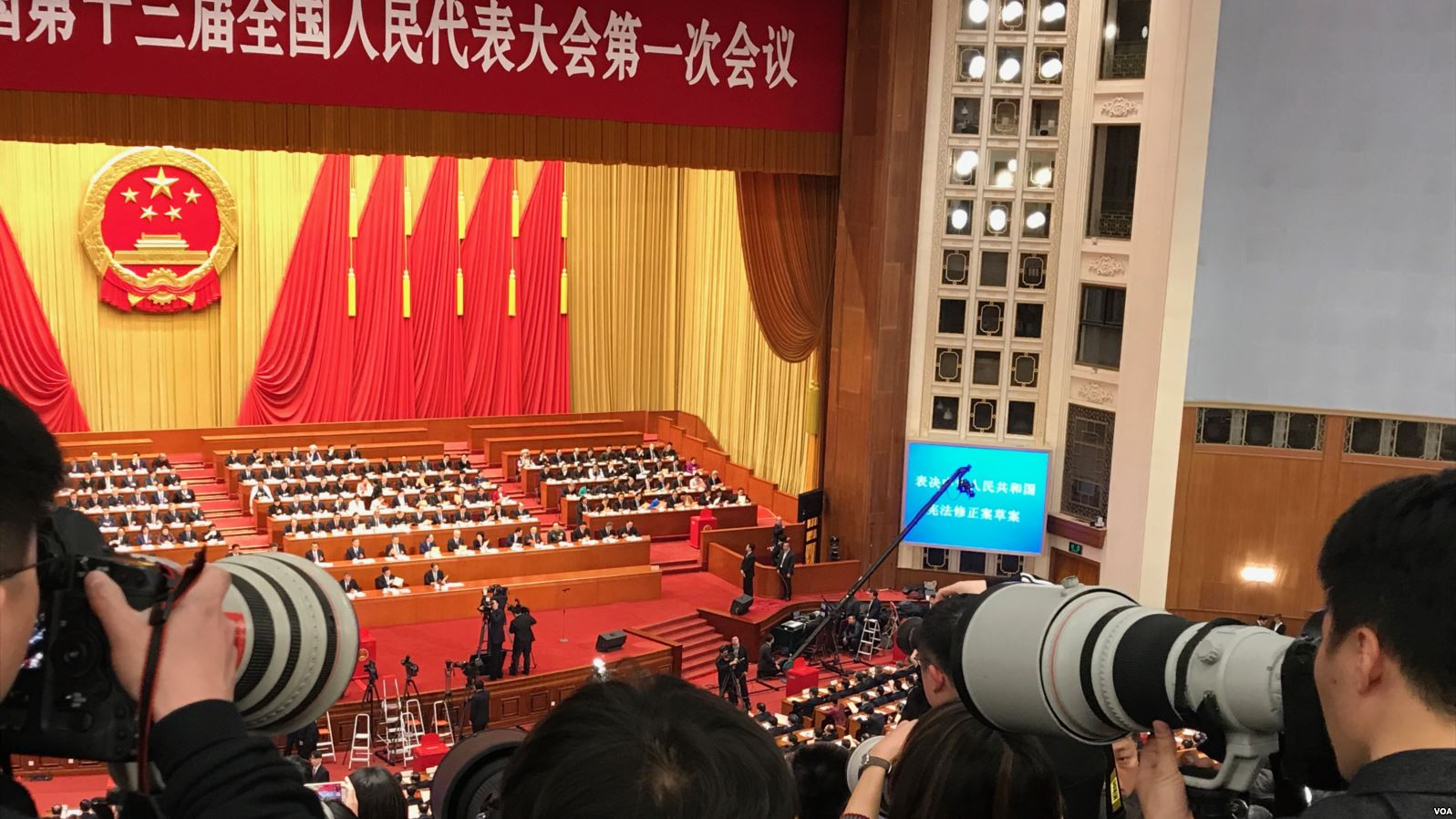
The first session of the 13th National People's Congress voting on the constitutional amendment on 11 March 2018

The first session of the 13th NPC opened on 5 March. On March 9, 2,952 deputies of the NPC proposed additional amendments to the draft to change the name of the "Law Committee" to "Constitution and Law Committee". The Secretariat of the Presidium of the Congress decided to add a paragraph to Article 44 of the Draft Constitutional Amendment and include the additional amendments as the second paragraph. On the afternoon of March 11, the NPC voted to pass the Draft Constitutional Amendment. At 15:52, the host of the Congress announced that the Constitutional Amendment was passed. There were 2,958 votes in favor, 2 votes against, 3 abstentions and 1 invalid vote. On 14 March, it was reported that the amended constitution had been published by the People's Publishing House and distributed in Xinhua Bookstores across the country.

The text of the amendment to the Constitution of China

== Amendments ==
- The preamble of the constitution was expanded to include the phrases "Scientific Outlook on Development", "Xi Jinping Thought on Socialism with Chinese Characteristics for a New Era", "a prosperous, strong, democratic, civilized, harmonious and beautiful modern socialist country" and the "great rejuvenation of the Chinese nation". Additionally, the word "legal system" was replaced with the word "rule of law", and concepts including the new concept for development, the five-in-one overall plan and the concept of ecological civilization building were added.
- The leadership of the Chinese Communist Party (CCP) over the country was codified into the main body of the constitution, with the following sentence added after the second paragraph of Article 1 of the constitution: "The leadership of the Communist Party of China is the most essential feature of socialism with Chinese characteristics."
- The constitutional oath of office system was codified into the constitution, with the third paragraph being added to Article 27 of the constitution: "When assuming office, state officials shall publicly take the constitutional oath in accordance with the law."
- The setup of the NPC's Special Committees was adjusted and the NPC Law Committee was changed into the NPC Constitution and Law Committee.
- The term limits for the President and Vice President were abolished. The third paragraph of Article 79 of the constitution deleted the clause "The President and Vice President may not serve for more than two consecutive terms." Term limits for other posts were kept.
- Cities with districts were officially granted the power of local legislation. The second paragraph is added to Article 100 of the constitution: "The people's congresses of cities divided into districts and their standing committees may, in accordance with the provisions of law, formulate local regulations, which are to take effect after being reported to and approved by the standing committees of the people's congresses of the corresponding provinces or autonomous regions, provided that such regulations do not contravene the Constitution, laws, administrative regulations, or the local regulations of the corresponding provinces or autonomous regions."
- The National Supervisory Commission was established, with a new section was added to Chapter 3 of the constitution "National Organs" as Section 7, the "Supervisory Commission". In addition, the relevant articles of the constitution were amended. Afterwards, the Ministry of Supervision, the National Bureau of Corruption Prevention, the Anti-Corruption Bureau of the Supreme People's Procuratorate, the Procuratorate of Malfeasance and Infringement, and the Office of Prevention of Occupational Crimes were abolished.

== Aftermath ==
According to Xinhua News Agency, the goal of removing the term limits was to strengthen the "three-in-one" leadership system (“三位一体”领导体制), in which the top leader simultaneously serves as the general secretary of the CCP, state president and chairman of the CMC. According to the Financial Times, Xi Jinping expressed his views of constitutional amendment at meetings with Chinese officials and foreign dignitaries. Xi explained the decision in terms of needing to align two more powerful posts—general secretary of the CCP and chairman of the CMC—which have no term limits. However, Xi did not say whether he intended to be party general secretary, CMC chairman and state president, for three or more terms. On 10 March 2023, during the first session of the 14th National People's Congress, Xi was unanimously elected for an unprecedented third term as president.

A 2023 study found, using survey experiments from 2018, that 37 percent supported "removing the term limit for the national leader" in indirect surveys, compared to 59.6% in direct surveys, though it did add that "as the 95% confidence interval crosses 50%, we cannot conclude that only a minority supported the term limit removal". It also found that 76.7% trust the central government while 67% trust the local government. It concludes that "The lack of evidence for majority support for the term limit removal indicates the Chinese public is not unquestioning or naïve; they are capable of expressing reservations about government, at least indirectly. This finding further suggests the relatively high level of trust in the national government is largely genuine".

== See also ==
- Constitutional history of the People's Republic of China
- Abolition of the lifetime tenure system for leading cadres
