= Tian Jiaying =

Chinese secretary

- 田家英
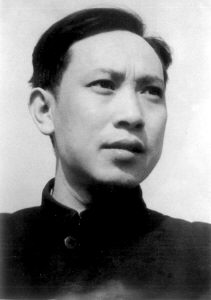
- Tian in the 1940s
- Born: January 4, 1922; Chengdu, Sichuan, China
- Died: May 23, 1966 (aged 44); Beijing, China
- Education: Northern Shaanxi Public School; Yan'an Marxist College
- Known for: Secretary of Mao Zedong
- Political party: Chinese Communist Party

Tian Jiaying (Chinese: 田家英; January 4, 1922 – May 23, 1966) was Mao Zedong's personal secretary for 18 years. He committed suicide at the beginning of the Cultural Revolution.

== Early life ==
Tian was born on January 4, 1922, in Chengdu, Sichuan, Republic of China. He lost his father at age 3, and his mother at age 9, and dropped out of school due to poverty. When he was 11, Tian became an apprentice in his brother's pharmacy in Chengdu. In 1935, 13-year-old Tian Jiaying became a local "prodigy" for his work in poetry and writing and began to publish his poetry and newspaper articles in Sichuan.

While in middle school, Tian participated in the Anti-Japanese Salvation Movement, during which time he became affiliated with the Chinese Communist Party (CCP) and began to publish articles under the pseudonym "Tian Jiaying". He also participated in the anti-Japanese national salvation group "Haiyan Society" led by CCP members and was expelled from the school.

== Secretary of Mao Zedong ==
In 1938, he went to Yan'an to study in Northern Shaanxi Public School. After graduating in the same year, he served as secretary and history instructor of the CCP's Northern Shaanxi Public School and joined the Chinese Communist Party. The following year, he entered the Yan'an Marxist College to study. After graduating in 1939, he stayed at the Institute of Chinese Studies at the Marxism-Leninism College.

In 1941, Tian was selected into the Political Research Office of the Central Committee of the Chinese Communist Party, and then transferred to the Propaganda Department of the CCP Central Committee, responsible for compiling textbooks for primary schools. In 1946, Tian was favored by Mao Zedong and was hired as tutor of his son Mao Anying. In 1948, Tian became the secretary of Mao Zedong on the recommendation of Hu Qiaomu. In 1954 he was appointed Deputy Director of the General Office of the CCP Central Committee, responsible for the work of the Secretary's Office.

Tian participated in the editing of the first to fourth volumes of Selected Works of Mao Zedong, and was mainly responsible for writing the annotations. He also participated in the writing of the Constitution of China, Mao's poems, and drafted the opening speech of Mao at the 8th National Congress of the Chinese Communist Party.

In the early 1960s, Mao sent Tian to organize an investigation team to investigate in Hunan to understand the situation and problems in implementing the "Regulations on the Work of Rural People's Communes". Tian's report questioned the efficacy and logic behind the Great Leap Forward.

In May 1966, Tian was purged from the CCP; on 23 May he committed suicide. The cause of his death has been disputed.

In 1980, the CCP Central Committee politically rehabilitated Tian, and held memorial service in his honor.
