= Party-state capitalism =

Ownership of an economy by a one-party state

- Simplified Chinese: 党国资本主义
- Traditional Chinese: 黨國資本主義
Transcriptions
Standard Mandarin
- Hanyu Pinyin: Dǎngguó Zīběnzhǔyì
- Bopomofo: ㄉㄤˇ ㄍㄨㄛˊ ㄗ ㄅㄣˇ ㄓㄨˇ ㄧˋ
- Wade–Giles: Tang^{3}-kuo^{2} Tzŭ^{1}-pên^{3}-chu^{3}-i^{4}

Party-state capitalism (Chinese: 黨國資本主義) is a term used by some economists and sociologists to describe the contemporary economy of China under the Chinese Communist Party (CCP). The term has also been used to describe the economy of Taiwan under the military government of the Kuomintang (KMT). The term is not used by the Kuomintang itself; it was coined by Taiwanese economists, such as Chen Shih-meng and Cyrus Chu, in their research report Deconstructing the KMT-State Capitalism (解構黨國資本主義; 解称党国资本主义).

According to academic Ho-fung Jung of Johns Hopkins University, "China's state capitalism departs from state capitalism in other countries in that the power of the CCP in the economy goes far beyond SOEs. Some, therefore, conceptualize China's political economy as a unique 'party-state capitalism.'"

== Characteristics ==
Margaret Pearson, Meg Rithmire, and Kellee S. Tsai have proposed to use the term "party-state capitalism" as a variant of state capitalism to conceptualize the political-economic dynamics of China since the late 2000s. They demonstrate this concept by examining three prominent manifestations of China's unique model: party-state encroachment on markets; a blending of functions and interests of state and private ownership; and politicized interactions with foreign capital.

- Party-state encroachment on markets: A fundamental indicator of the expansion of the Chinese party-state system is the resurgence of CCP organizations within enterprises, including private enterprises and even foreign firms. A second prominent feature of Chinese party-state capitalism is the expansion of state capital beyond state-owned enterprises, a process that scholars have termed "state financialization". Another manifestation of party-state economic activity was the evolution of the scope of industrial policy.
- Blending of functions and interests of state and private ownership: In China, the ambiguity surrounding the definition of private ownership has called into question the apparent distinction between state-owned enterprises and private enterprises. At the same time, private enterprises have emerged as key players in supporting the country's domestic security objectives.
- Politicized interactions with foreign capital: Increased political oversight and scrutiny of foreign capital is a relatively new manifestation of party-state capitalism. Specifically, not only domestic economic actors, but also foreign companies operating in China and in territories over which China claims sovereignty, expect political correctness as defined by the CCP.

== See also ==
- Dang Guo
- Crony capitalism
- Neoauthoritarianism (China)
