= Chinese Communist Party Admission Oath =

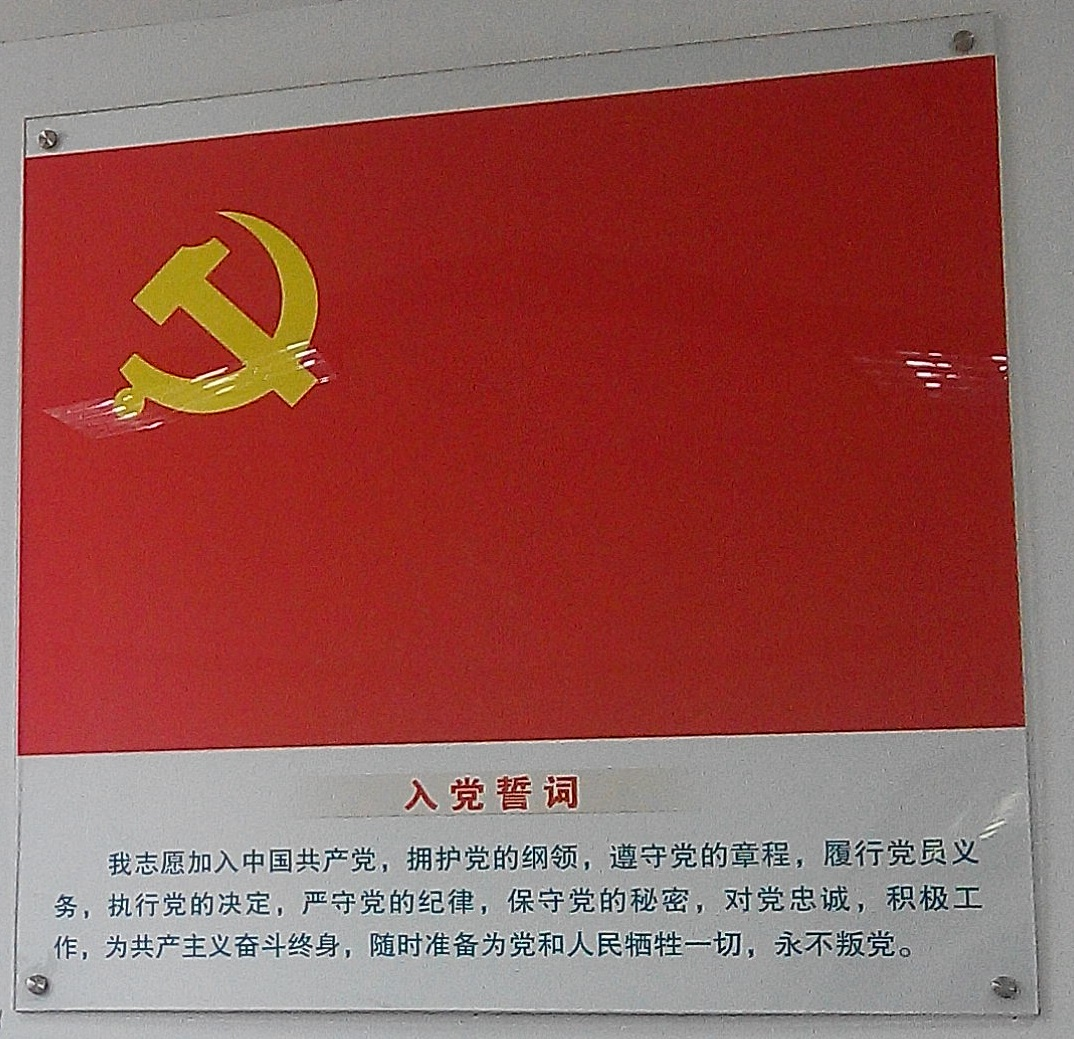
The Chinese Communist Party Admission Oath displayed below the Flag of the Chinese Communist Party

The Chinese Communist Party Admission Oath (Chinese: 中国共产党入党誓词) is an oath that prospective members of the Chinese Communist Party must take to become a party member according to Article 6 of the Constitution of the Chinese Communist Party.

There have been five versions of the admission oath used during different periods of history. The fifth and current version of the admission oath were adopted on September 6, 1982, during the 12th National Congress of the Chinese Communist Party.

== The oath ==
=== Red Army period ===
Strictly maintain secrecy, obey discipline, sacrifice personal interests, engage in class struggle, strive for revolution, and never betray the Party.

=== During the Second-Sino Japanese War ===
I volunteer to join the Communist Party of China, uphold Party discipline, fear no difficulties or sacrifices, and fight to the end for the cause of communism.

=== During the Second Chinese Civil War ===
I hereby volunteer to join the Communist Party of China and make the following oath: 1. To dedicate my life to the cause of communism. 2. The interests of the Party are above all else. 3. To abide by Party discipline. 4. To fear no hardship and work for the Party forever. 5. To be a model for the masses. 6. To keep Party secrets. 7. To have faith in the Party. 8. To persevere and never betray the Party.

=== Early days of the People's Republic of China ===
I volunteer to join the Communist Party of China, acknowledge the Party's program and constitution, implement the Party's resolutions, abide by the Party's discipline, keep the Party's secrets, and be ready at any time to sacrifice everything for the complete liberation of all mankind.

=== Current oath ===
Chinese (S)

我志愿加入中国共产党，
拥护党的纲领，
遵守党的章程，
履行党员义务，
执行党的决定，
严守党的纪律，
保守党的秘密，
对党忠诚，
积极工作，
为共产主义奋斗终身，
随时准备为党和人民牺牲一切，
永不叛党。

Hanyu Pinyin romanization

Wǒ zhìyuàn jiārù Zhōngguó Gòngchǎndǎng,
yōnghù dǎng de gānglǐng,
zūnshǒu dǎng de zhāngchéng,
lǚxíng dǎngyuán yìwù,
zhíxíng dǎng de juédìng,
yánshǒu dǎng de jìlǜ,
bǎoshǒu dǎng de mìmì,
duì dǎng zhōngchéng,
jījí gōngzuò,
wèi gòngchǎn zhǔyì fèndòu zhōngshēn,
suíshí zhǔnbèi wèi dǎng hé rénmín xīshēng yīqiè,
yǒng bù pàndǎng.

English Translation

It is my will to join the Communist Party of China,
uphold the Party's program,
observe the provisions of the Party Constitution,
fulfill a Party member's duties,
carry out the Party's decisions,
strictly observe Party discipline,
guard Party secrets,
be loyal to the Party,
work hard,
fight for communism throughout my life,
be ready at all times to sacrifice my all for the Party and the people,
and never betray the Party.

== See also ==
- Constitutional oath of office of China
- Loyalty oath
