= First session of the 13th National People's Congress =

2018 National People's Congress; 第十三届全国人民代表大会第一次会议; _{1st plenary session of the}; _{13th National People's Congress}; 5 March – 20 March
President	Premier	Congress Chairman
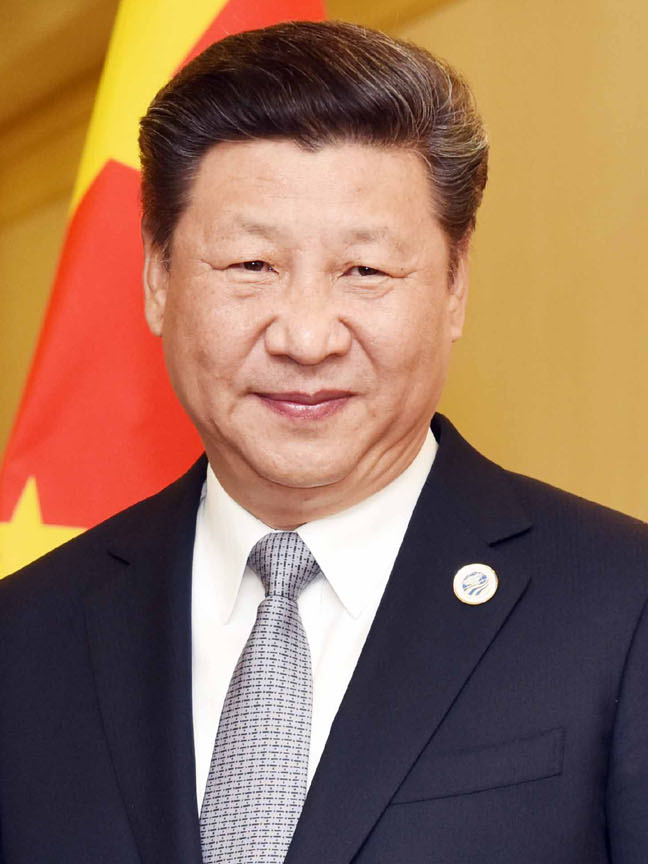
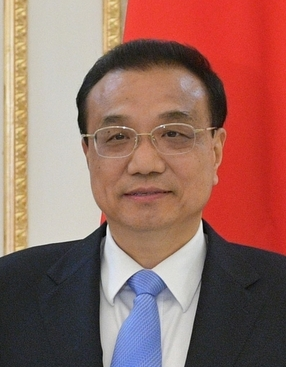
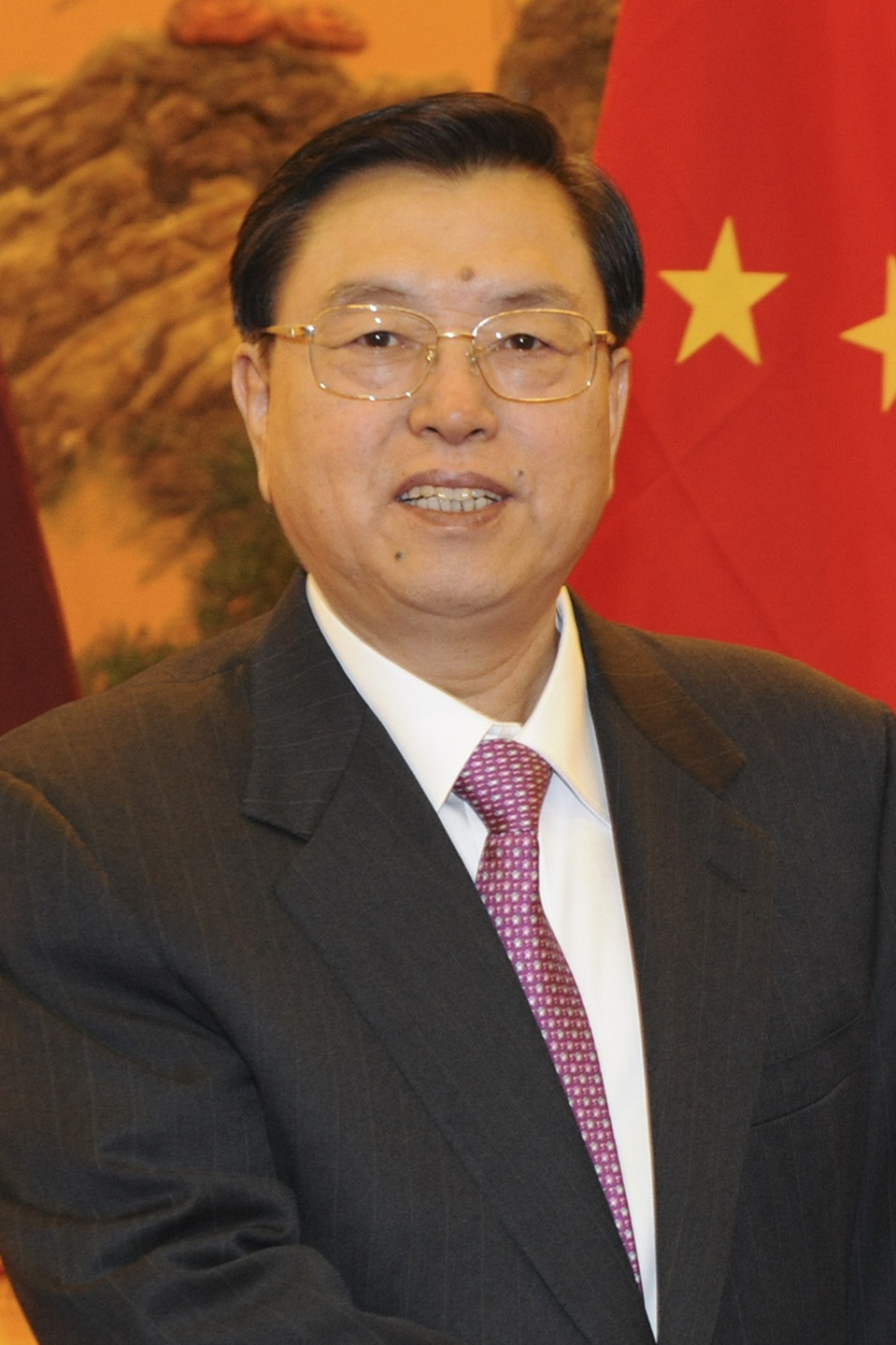
Xi Jinping	Li Keqiang	Zhang Dejiang
since 14 March 2013	since 15 March 2013	since 14 March 2013
President-elect	Premier-elect	Congress Chairman-elect
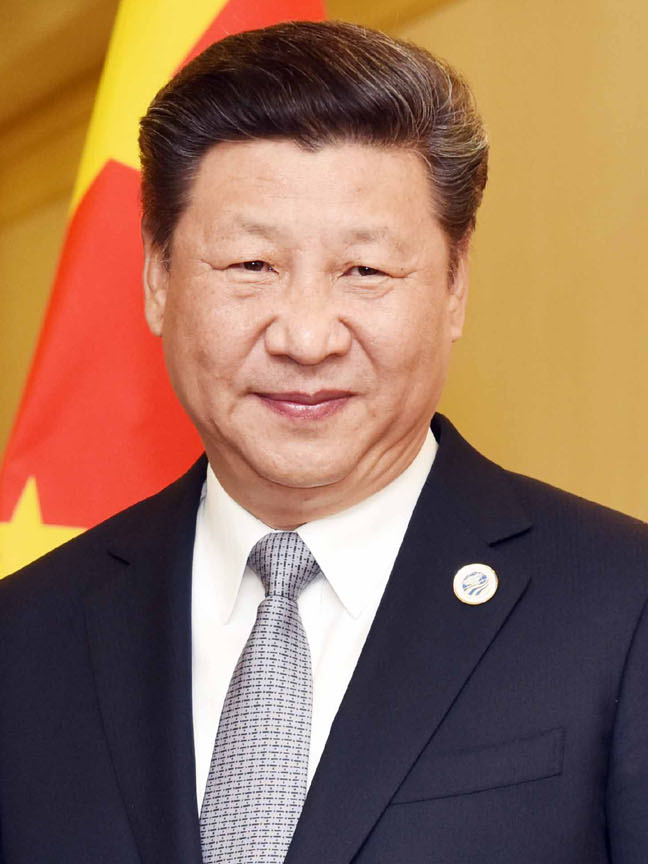
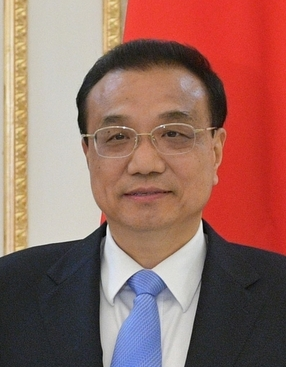
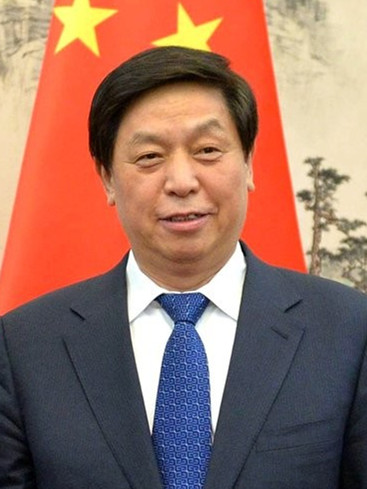
Xi Jinping	Li Keqiang	Li Zhanshu
since 17 March 2018	since 18 March 2018	since 17 March 2018

Website
- 2018 NPC official website

Members by Delegation to the 13th National People's Congress of the People's Republic of China as elected in 2018

The first session of the 13th National People's Congress was held in March 2018 at the Great Hall of the People in Beijing, China. The session opened on 5 March and concluded on 20 March. Major state positions were elected in this session.

The Chinese Communist Party proposed amending the country's constitution, for the first time after 2004, including writing Scientific Outlook on Development and Xi Jinping Thought into the Preamble, and removing the provision that the President and Vice President "shall serve no more than two consecutive terms" from the Constitution. Amending the Constitution of China requires a majority vote of two-thirds of all the deputies to the Congress. On 11 March 2018, the Congress passed the amendment in the third plenary meeting of this session, attended by 2,964 out of 2,980 deputies, with 2,958 votes for, two against, three abstaining, and one void.

On 17 March 2018, Xi Jinping, general secretary of the Chinese Communist Party, was unanimously re-elected as the president of China and the chairman of the Central Military Commission, and Li Zhanshu was elected as the chairman of the Standing Committee of the National People's Congress.

Li Keqiang was nominated as the Premier by President Xi Jinping and approved by the Congress on 18 March 2018. Han Zheng, Sun Chunlan, Hu Chunhua and Liu He are nominated as the Vice Premiers by Premier Li Keqiang and approved by the Congress on 19 March 2018.

== Voting results ==
=== State positions ===
NPCSC Chairman Election				NPCSC Secretary-general Election			
Candidates	For	Against	Abstain	Candidates	For	Against	Abstain
Li Zhanshu	2980	0	0	Yang Zhenwu	2980	0	0
Presidential Election				Vice-Presidential Election			
Candidates	For	Against	Abstain	Candidates	For	Against	Abstain
Xi Jinping	2980	0	0	Wang Qishan	2969	1	0
NPCSC Vice-Chairmen Election				NSC Director Election			
Candidates	For	Against	Abstain	Candidates	For	Against	Abstain
Wang Chen	2980	0	0	Yang Xiaodu	2969	1	0
Cao Jianming	2980	0	0	Yang Xiaodu	2969	1	0
Zhang Chunxian	2979	1	0	Yang Xiaodu	2969	1	0
Shen Yueyue	2979	1	0	Yang Xiaodu	2969	1	0
Ji Bingxuan	2980	0	0	Yang Xiaodu	2969	1	0
Arken Imirbaki	2980	0	0	Yang Xiaodu	2969	1	0
Wan Exiang	2980	0	0	Yang Xiaodu	2969	1	0
Chen Zhu	2980	0	0	Liu Yuan	2	0	0
Wang Dongming	2979	1	0	Liu Yuan	2	0	0
Padma Choling	2980	0	0	Liu Yuan	2	0	0
Ding Zhongli	2978	1	1	Liu Yuan	2	0	0
Hao Mingjin	2980	0	0	Liu Yuan	2	0	0
Cai Dafeng	2979	1	0	Liu Yuan	2	0	0
Wu Weihua	2980	0	0	Liu Yuan	2	0	0
Premierial Election				Vice-Premierial Election			
Li Keqiang	2964	2	0	Han Zheng	2976	4	0
Li Keqiang	2964	2	0	Sun Chunlan	2956	5	8
Li Keqiang	2964	2	0	Hu Chunhua	2979	0	1
Li Keqiang	2964	2	0	Liu He	2964	3	2
CMC Chairmanship Election				CMC Vice-Chairmanship Election			
Candidates	For	Against	Abstain	Candidates	For	Against	Abstain
Xi Jinping	2980	0	0	Xu Qiliang	2962	0	4
Xi Jinping	2980	0	0	Zhang Youxia	2963	2	1
Supreme Court President Election				Procurator-general Election			
Candidates	For	Against	Abstain	Candidates	For	Against	Abstain
Zhou Qiang	2956	5	5	Zhang Jun	2951	5	10

=== Resolutions ===
Topic	For	Against	Abstain	Rate
Premier Li Keqiang's Government Work Report	2,956	3	3	99.80%
State Council Institutional Reform Plan	2,966	2	2	99.87%
Report on the Implementation of the 2017 National Economic and Social Development Plan and the 2018 Draft Plan	2,902	41	19	97.97%
Report on the Execution of the Central and Local Budgets for 2017 and on the Draft Central and Local Budgets for 2018	2,838	87	37	95.81%
Amendment to the Constitution	2,958	2	3	99.83%
Supervision Law	2,914	28	18	98.45%
Chairman Zhang Dejiang's NPCSC Work Report	2,922	22	18	98.65%
Chief Justice Zhou Qiang's Supreme People's Court Work Report	2,806	132	23	94.77%
Procurator-General Cao Jianming's Supreme People's Procuratorate Work Report	2,781	138	43	93.89%

== Elected members ==
Below is the number of deputies elected from each delegation.

Constituency	Communist	Jiusan	DL	CNDCA	CAPD	Peasants and Workers	Left Kuomintang	Zhi Gong	Taiwan League	Independent	Total
Anhui	75	3	3	3	2	4	2	3	0	17	112
Beijing	32	2	1	2	3	1	1	2	0	10	54
Chongqing	43	1	1	4	1	1	1	1	0	7	60
Fujian	44	1	2	1	3	2	2	1	3	10	69
Gansu	40	0	1	0	0	0	1	0	0	11	53
Guangdong	112	4	1	2	1	2	1	2	1	35	161
Guangxi	61	2	2	2	1	2	2	2	0	15	89
Guizhou	53	1	1	2	3	1	1	1	0	9	72
Hainan	22	0	0	1	0	0	0	1	0	1	25
Hebei	78	4	5	3	2	4	2	0	0	26	124
Heilongjiang	67	1	3	3	1	1	1	0	0	14	91
Henan	126	3	4	5	2	2	3	3	0	23	171
Hong Kong	0	0	0	0	0	0	0	0	0	36	36
Hubei	91	3	2	3	5	3	1	1	1	8	118
Hunan	76	3	1	1	2	2	2	2	0	28	117
Inner Mongolia	47	1	1	1	1	1	1	0	0	4	57
Jiangsu	107	1	5	4	4	1	1	3	1	22	149
Jiangxi	61	2	3	2	2	2	2	0	0	6	80
Jilin	51	1	1	1	2	1	3	0	0	3	63
Liaoning	72	6	3	0	2	4	0	2	0	12	101
Macau	0	0	0	0	0	0	0	0	0	12	12
Ningxia	16	0	0	0	0	1	0	0	0	4	21
People's Liberation Army	294	0	0	0	0	0	0	0	0	0	294
Qinghai	15	0	0	0	0	0	0	0	0	5	20
Shaanxi	49	2	2	2	2	2	2	1	0	5	67
Shandong	123	7	4	5	4	2	5	4	0	20	174
Shanghai	38	3	4	1	1	2	1	1	1	6	58
Shanxi	51	2	1	1	1	2	2	0	0	9	69
Sichuan	104	5	5	3	4	6	2	4	0	14	147
Taiwan	5	0	0	0	0	0	1	0	4	3	13
Tianjin	27	1	1	1	1	1	2	2	0	5	41
Tibet	18	0	0	0	0	0	0	0	0	1	19
Xinjiang	49	0	0	0	0	0	1	0	0	10	60
Yunnan	63	1	0	1	1	1	0	1	0	22	90
Zhejiang	65	4	1	2	3	3	1	1	0	13	93
Total	2,175	64	58	56	54	54	44	38	11	426	2,980

Preceded by 2017 NPC	Annual National People's Congress Sessions of the People's Republic of China; March 2018	Succeeded by 2019 NPC
