= Constitution of China =

Supreme law of China since 1982

Constitution of the People's Republic of China
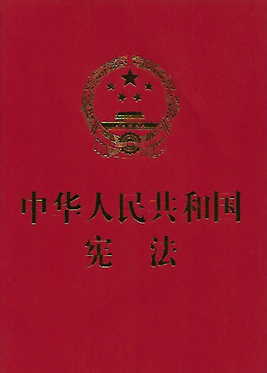
- Cover of the current constitution

Overview
- Original title: 中华人民共和国宪法
- Jurisdiction: People's Republic of China
- Ratified: 4 December 1982
- Date effective: 4 December 1982
- System: Unitary communist state

Government structure
- Branches: One (Note: All six branches: Legislative, Executive, Military, Supervisory, Judicial and Procuratorial are subservient to the National People's Congress, the supreme organ of state power.)
- Head of state: President (Note: China does not have a head of state constitutionally, but a "state representative". While the President of China has many of the characteristics of the head of state, the Chinese constitution does not define it as such.)
- Chambers: Unicameral (National People's Congress) (Note: The de facto legislature is the Standing Committee of the National People's Congress)
- Executive: State Council headed by the Premier of the State Council
- Judiciary: Supreme People's Court; Supreme People's Procuratorate; National Supervisory Commission
- Federalism: No – Decentralization within a Unitary State (special administrative regions)
- Electoral college: Yes – the National People's Congress, which elects all other state authorities, is itself elected by two layers of Indirect election: County and Township People's Congresses elect the members of Provincial People's Congresses, who in turn elect the members of the National People's Congress.

History
- First legislature: 21 September 1949 (Chinese People's Political Consultative Conference); 27 September 1954 (National People's Congress)
- First executive: 27 September 1954 (1st National People's Congress); 1 October 1949 (Central People's Government)
- First court: 22 October 1949
- Amendments: 5
- Last amended: 11 March 2018
- Location: Beijing
- Commissioned by: Constitution Drafting Committee
- Supersedes: Common Program

Full text
- Constitution of the People's Republic of China at Wikisource

Constitution of China
- Simplified Chinese: 中华人民共和国宪法
- Traditional Chinese: 中華人民共和國憲法
Transcriptions
Standard Mandarin
- Hanyu Pinyin: Zhōnghuá Rénmín Gònghéguó Xiànfǎ

The Constitution of the People's Republic of China is a communist state constitution and the supreme law of the People's Republic of China (PRC).

First attempts at a constitutional system in China started near the end of the Qing dynasty, which was overthrown following the 1911 Revolution. The newly established Republic of China adopted a Provisional Constitution in 1912, which provided a parliamentary system. However, the constitution was largely ineffective as the country quickly disintegrated into the Warlord Era. In 1928, the Kuomintang unified most of China and promulgated the Provisional Constitution of the Political Tutelage Period in 1931, intended to remain in effect until the country had been pacified. In 1947, the Kuomintang adopted the Constitution of the Republic of China; however, that constitution was never extensively nor effectively implemented due to the outbreak of the Chinese Civil War.

In September 1949, the first plenary session of the Chinese People's Political Consultative Conference adopted the Common Program, which acted as the temporary constitution after the PRC's foundation in October 1949. On 20 September 1954, the first constitution was adopted by the first session of the 1st National People's Congress. The constitution went through a major revision during the Cultural Revolution in 1975. The constitution went through further revisions in 1978 following the end of the Cultural Revolution. The current constitution was adopted by the 5th National People's Congress on 4 December 1982, which was adopted during the reform and opening up. The 1982 constitution has gone through five subsequent revisions.

The current constitution consists of 4 chapters and 143 articles. It explains the nature and basic policies of the PRC, establishes the leadership of the Chinese Communist Party (CCP) over the country, highlights the concept of democratic centralism, and states that the PRC is a "socialist state governed by a people's democratic dictatorship that is led by the working class and based on an alliance of workers and peasants". It stipulates the central and local state institutions operate under a system of people's congresses, community-level self-governance and regional ethnic autonomy.

== History ==
Dynastic China adopted a constitutional system oscillating between a feudal distribution of power and a centralistic autocracy. The idea of a constitutional monarchy, and a written constitution, became influential towards the end of the 19th century, inspired immediately in large parts by the precedent of the Meiji Constitution in the Empire of Japan. The first attempt towards constitutionalism in China was during the Hundred Days' Reform that took place in 1898 by the young Guangxu Emperor and his reform-minded supporters, but a coup by conservative monarchists loyal to Empress Dowager Cixi ended this effort. The same faction, however, eventually adopted a policy of transitioning towards constitutionalism. However, the first constitutional document was only published in 1908, and the first constitutional document with legal force (the "Nineteen Covenants") was not implemented until 1911, after the eruption of the 1911 Revolution, which led to the end of the Qing dynasty the next year.

The Provisional Constitution of the Republic of China was drawn up in March 1912 and formed the basic government document of the Republic of China until 1928. It provided a Western-style parliamentary system headed by a weak president. However, the system was quickly usurped when Song Jiaoren was assassinated by the orders of President Yuan Shikai. Upon Yuan's death in 1916, China disintegrated into warlordism and the Beiyang government operating under the Constitution remained in the hands of various military leaders. The Kuomintang under Chiang Kai-shek established control over much of China by 1928. The Nationalist Government promulgated the Provisional Constitution of the Political Tutelage Period on 5 May 1931. The Kuomintang intended this constitution to remain in effect until the country had been pacified and the people sufficiently "educated" to participate in democratic government. On 25 December 1946, the Kuomintang ratified the Constitution of the Republic of China during the National Constituent Assembly. However, it was never extensively nor effectively implemented due to the outbreak of the Chinese Civil War in mainland China at the time of the constitution's promulgation.

=== Common Program ===
In September 1949, the first plenary session of the Chinese People's Political Consultative Conference adopted the Common Program to replace the ROC constitution, which was not recognized by the Chinese Communist Party (CCP). The Common Program declared in its preamble: "The Chinese People's Political Consultative Conference, representing the will of the people of the whole country, proclaims the establishment of the People's Republic of China and organizes the people's own central government." The Chinese constitutional scholars have maintained that although not a formal constitution, the Common Program acted as a provisional constitution. The program stipulated the composition of the government organs and the new government's military, economic, cultural and educational, ethnic, and foreign policies.

=== 1954 constitution ===
As early as 1949, when CCP Politburo member Liu Shaoqi secretly visited the Soviet Union and in early 1950, when Chairman Mao Zedong first visited the Soviet Union, Soviet leader Joseph Stalin had suggested that the CCP prepare for the drafting of a constitution. In 1952, Stalin urged Chairman Liu Shaoqi, who was visiting the Soviet Union, to draft a constitution as soon as possible to solve the problem of legitimacy and "organize a one-party government". It was only at the end of 1952 that the PRC began to prepare for the drafting of a constitution. Scholar Zhang Ming believes that Stalin suggested that the CCP draft a constitution not only to solve the legitimacy problem of the new government itself, but also because he was worried about China's development towards nationalism. He believes that "completely cutting off the possibility of China following the Yugoslav path is the reason why Stalin insisted on China drafting a constitution when the CCP clearly expressed its unwillingness."

On 1 December 1952, the CCP Central Committee issued the Notice on Convening the National Congress of the Party, which stated that the conditions for convening the National People's Congress was met, and preparations were being made for the drafting of the constitution. On 24 December 1952, at a meeting of the Standing Committee of the 1st National Committee of the Chinese People's Political Consultative Conference, Zhou Enlai, on behalf of the CCP, proposed to draft the constitution; the CPPCC passed the proposal. On 1 January 1953, the CCP's official newspaper, the People's Daily, listed the drafting of the constitution as one of the three tasks for 1953. On 13 January 1953, the Central People's Government Council decided to form a Constitution Drafting Committee composed of more than 30 people, including Mao Zedong.

In early March 1953, Mao Zedong said in the revised and approved Explanation of the First Draft of the Constitution: "The basic task of the Constitution is to make correct provisions in terms of the system of the state, the power of the state and the rights of the people, so as to provide a legal guarantee for the completion of the general task of the state during the transition period. The main effort of the draft Constitution is primarily focused on this purpose." This meant that this constitution had a certain transitional nature. The preamble of the constitution stipulated that "during the transition period, the state will gradually realize the socialist industrialization of the state and gradually complete the socialist transformation of agriculture, handicrafts and capitalist industry and commerce."

At the end of 1953, the CCP Central Committee established a drafting group for the constitution. Mao Zedong led core drafting group members Chen Boda, Hu Qiaomu and Tian Jiaying to Hangzhou to draft the constitution. As none of these four were constitutional law graduates, they based their draft on the 1936 Soviet Constitution, the 1952 Romanian Constitution and other constitutions. The drafting group submitted the first draft in February 1954 and reviewed it within the CCP Politburo. On 15 March 1954, the Politburo decided that Chen Boda and others would form a constitutional group to make final revisions to the articles of the first draft of the constitution and submit them to the Central Committee for discussion; a Constitution Drafting Committee Office was formed, with Li Weihan as the secretary-general. The CCP's constitutional group was responsible for polishing it and obtaining confirmation from the Politburo.

On 20 September 1954, at the first session of the 1st National People's Congress, the delegates cast a total of 1,197 votes, with 1,197 votes in favor, and the Constitution of the People's Republic of China was adopted unanimously.

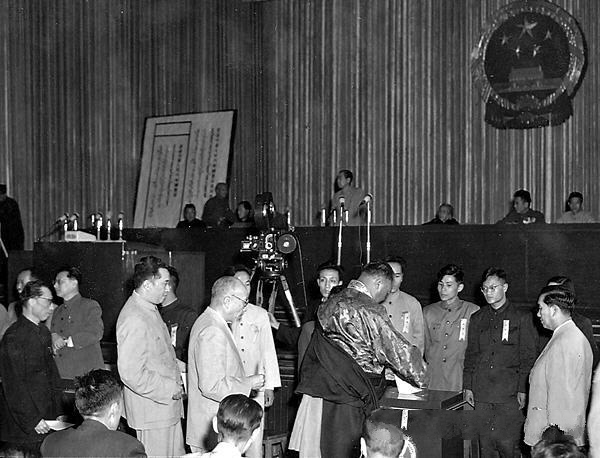
Delegates to the 1st National People's Congress voting for the Constitution in 1954

This constitution declared China to be a people's democratic state and stipulated that citizens have the freedom of movement and the right to reside, and also includes the clause that all citizens are equal before the law. Mao did not give much importance to the formal constitution. On 21 August 1958, Mao said at an enlarged meeting of the Politburo held in Beidaihe: “We cannot do without laws, but we have our own set of laws. We cannot rely on laws to govern the majority of people. The majority of people must develop good habits. Who can remember so many articles in the Civil Code and the Criminal Code? I participated in the formulation of the Constitution, and I can’t remember it either. Most of our rules and regulations, ninety percent of them, are made by the departments and bureaus. We basically do not rely on those. We mainly rely on resolutions and meetings, which are held four times a year."

=== 1975 constitution ===
After the start of the Cultural Revolution in 1966, Liu Shaoqi, the state chairman appointed by the constitution, was imprisoned. After Liu Shaoqi was dismissed in 1968, the position of state chairman became vacant, and the original constitutional system. In 1970, Mao Zedong proposed to abolish the position of state chairman, which was opposed by many leaders of the CCP, leading the constitutional amendment was deadlocked. In 1971, after the Lin Biao incident, the abolition of the state chairman became a foregone conclusion, and the work of constitutional amendment made some progress. On 17 January 1975, at the first session of the 4th National People's Congress, the second constitution was formally adopted, which abolished the positions of state chairman and vice chairman.

This constitution was the first to include the leadership of the Chinese Communist Party in its main text and incorporated a large number of the institutions of the CCP into the system of state institutions. The 1975 constitution stipulated that the Chairman of the Chinese Communist Party commanded the armed forces of the whole country, which led to "the party and the state being indistinguishable". Mao Zedong Thought was also written into the main text of the constitution. The constitution abolished the electoral system, changed the people's congress system from direct election by the people and indirect election by the lower level people's congresses, and implemented the form of "democratic consultation election".

=== 1978 constitution ===
After the Cultural Revolution ended in 1976, the revision of the constitution was put back on the agenda. In 1977, the CCP Central Committee decided to establish a Constitutional Revision Committee, which was composed entirely of members of the Politburo. The Constitutional Revision Committee was not actually put into operation. The Constitutional Revision Group designated by the Politburo directly undertook the revision of the draft constitution. After the draft constitution was completed, in October 1977, the CCP Central Committee issued a notice to "solicit opinions from the masses inside and outside the Party on revising the constitution." The group solicited this time was mainly composed of Party members, but also included a small number of non-Party members. The new constitution was adopted on 5 March 1978, at the first session of the 5th National People's Congress.

The new constitution restored the abolished procuratorial organs, but retained the "four big rights", often called the "four bigs": to speak out freely, air views fully, hold great debates, and write big-character posters. In addition, the constitution restored some of the civil rights clauses of the 1954 constitution, but did not restore the provision that all citizens are equal before the law. The main text of this constitution continued the relevant provisions on the leadership of the Chinese Communist Party and still included the institutions of the Chinese Communist Party in the operation system of the state institutions. The 1978 constitution stipulated that the Chairman of the CCP commanded the armed forces of the whole country. The main text of the constitution continued to include Mao Zedong Thought. The constitution restored the electoral system, abolished the form of "democratic consultation election", and stipulated that the people's representatives "are elected by secret ballot", but added the restriction that "democratic consultation should be conducted".

The 1978 constitution underwent two amendments. On 1 July 1979, the second session of the 5th National People's Congress passed a resolution to amend the constitutional articles, agreeing to establish standing committees for people's congresses at the county level and above, changing local revolutionary committees to local people's governments at various levels, changing the election of county-level people's congress deputies to direct election by voters, and changing the relationship between higher and lower-level people's procuratorates from supervision to leadership. On 10 September 1980, following the Democracy Wall period, the third session of the 5th National People's Congress passed a resolution to abolish the provision in Article 45 that granted the right to "speak out freely, air views widely, engage in great debates, and issue big-character posters."

=== 1982 constitution ===
In the early 1980s, as the CCP's started Boluan Fanzheng, revising the constitution was put on the agenda again. On 18 August 1980, Deng Xiaoping delivered a speech entitled Reform of the Leadership System of the Party and the State at an enlarged meeting of the Politburo, proposing a comprehensive constitutional amendment to the National People's Congress, emphasizing:

1. The Constitution should guarantee that the people enjoy full civil rights and truly have the power to manage state organizations at all levels and various enterprises and undertakings;
2. In areas where ethnic minorities live in concentrated communities, regional ethnic autonomy will be implemented, and the system of people's congresses will be improved.
3. The principle of not allowing excessive concentration of power must be reflected;
4. It is necessary to clarify which issues should be discussed and decided collectively. When making decisions, the principle of majority rule and one person, one vote must be strictly implemented. Each secretary has only one vote and the decision cannot be made by the first secretary.

In 1980, the National People's Congress decided to formally establish the Constitutional Amendment Committee chaired by Ye Jianying, Soong Ching-ling, and Peng Zhen, which included key leaders of the eight non-oppositional democratic parties, social organizations, and legal scholars. Ye said that "the amended constitution should reflect and be conducive to the reform and improvement of China's socialist political, economic, and cultural systems. The democratic, equal, and judicial independence principles of the legal system should be more fully realized, and appropriate provisions should be made in the constitutional amendment." The Constitutional Amendment Committee began operation immediately after its establishment, and the scope of discussion and deliberation for this constitutional amendment surpassed that of the previous two amendments.

During the discussion on constitutional amendment, Hu Qiaomu, Secretary-General of the Constitutional Amendment Committee, proposed to reduce the number of National People's Congress (NPC) deputies to 1,000 and establish two chambers under the NPC, each with 500 deputies, so that the NPC would become a permanent body and change the impression of the NPC as a "rubber stamp". Another member proposed to follow the system of establishing the Soviet of the Union and the Soviet of Nationalities of the Supreme Soviet of the Soviet Union, "forming one chamber according to the representatives generated by the region and the other chamber according to the representatives generated by the industry sector." However, the opponents, led by Deng Xiaoping and Ye Jianying, believed that "if the two sides disagree, it will be very troublesome to coordinate and difficult to operate." In the end, the two sides reached a compromise by greatly expanding the powers of the Standing Committee of the NPC, making it a permanent legislative body with the power to formulate most laws and review laws that should be approved by the NPC. In addition, during the constitutional amendment process, the professional opinions of legal scholars were adopted. For example, economist Sun Yefang wrote to the Constitutional Amendment Committee, suggesting the cancellation of the clauses on "the state being led by the Communist Party of China" and "guiding ideology," which was adopted by the Constitutional Amendment Committee. The constitution also restored the clause of "equality before the law". Peng Zhen explained the four principles of amending the constitution at a relevant meeting:

1. Adherence to the Four Cardinal Principles is the general guiding principle for revising the Constitution.
2. The constitution must be based on China's realities.
3. The constitution can only include what is currently feasible, the most fundamental and necessary. The constitution should play a role in unifying thought, further consolidating stability and unity, and ensuring the smooth progress of the Four Modernizations.
4. Based on the 1954 Constitution, the constitution will summarize the experiences from both positive and negative perspectives, inherit the 1954 Constitution, and develop the 1954 Constitution.

After more than two years of revision, on 4 December 1982, the fifth session of the 5th National People's Congress reviewed and adopted the new constitution. This constitution was built on the basis of the 1954 constitution and constituted the main body of the current constitution. Its main revisions included:

- The 1982 constitution expunges almost all of the rhetoric associated with the Cultural Revolution originally inserted in 1975. In fact, the constitution omits all references to the Cultural Revolution and restates CCP Chairman Mao Zedong's contributions in accordance with a major historical reassessment produced in June 1981 at the Sixth Plenum of the 11th Central Committee, the Resolution on Certain Questions in the History of Our Party since the Founding of the People's Republic of China. Among the changes from the Cultural Revolution era is that the 1982 constitution no longer describes the state as a proletarian dictatorship, inside describing it as "a people's democratic dictatorship, which is in essence a proletarian dictatorship."
- Provisions streamlined the relationship between the Party and the state, and between the executive, legislative, and judicial branches, separating the Party affairs organs of the CCP from the state institutional operation system.
- The clause stating that "the state is led by the Chinese Communist Party" has been removed, and the words "Chinese Communist Party" no longer appeared directly in the legally binding text of the Constitution.
- It achieved the separation of party and government, distinguishing between legislative, judicial, and executive powers.
- It stipulated that "no organization or individual, including the Chinese Communist Party, may have privileges that transcend the Constitution and the law". The 1982 constitution included the birth planning policy known as the one-child policy.
- The positions of President and Vice President, which were abolished in the 1975 Constitution, were re-established as the head of state, but the Supreme State Council and the National Defense Commission were abolished, and the President became a figurehead. A two-term limit (10 years total) was imposed on all state positions but the chair of the Central Military Commission, though no similar restrictions were put on CCP posts.
- Regarding the crucial issue of military affiliation, the provisions of the 1975 and 1978 Constitutions that the Chairman of the CCP commanded the army were abolished. It included the establishment of the Central Military Commission of the People's Republic of China to lead the national armed forces, which is parallel to the Central Military Commission of the CCP. The chairman was given absolute control over the CMC per the chairman responsibility system.

==== Amendments ====
The 1982 constitution has subsequently been amended five times. On 12 April 1988, the constitution was amended articles 10 and 11 of the constitution to allow the emergence of a private sector. It legalized the separation of land use rights from land ownership. This was the constitutional foundation for the 1990 Regulation of Urban Land Use Rights, which allowed land use rights to be bought and sold in the real estate market without changing the underlying title of public land. On 29 March 1993, the constitution was amended again. The amendment affected most of the articles and preamble, as well as the election of local people's congress representatives. The term socialist market economy was formally incorporated, and system of multi-party cooperation and political consultation to the preamble of the constitution.

The constitution was amended further on 15 March 1999. The amendment incorporated Deng Xiaoping Theory to the constitution. The revised constitution further improved the status of private enterprises, confirming that "the non-public economy is a significant component of China's socialist market economy." The revisions included a guarantee of private property ("legally obtained private property of the citizens shall not be violated").

In addition, it added: "The People's Republic of China shall implement the rule of law and build a socialist country under the rule of law." It abolished the clause of "counter-revolutionary crimes". It added human rights guarantees ("the State respects and protects human rights").

A 2004 amendment enshrined The March of the Volunteers as China's national anthem.

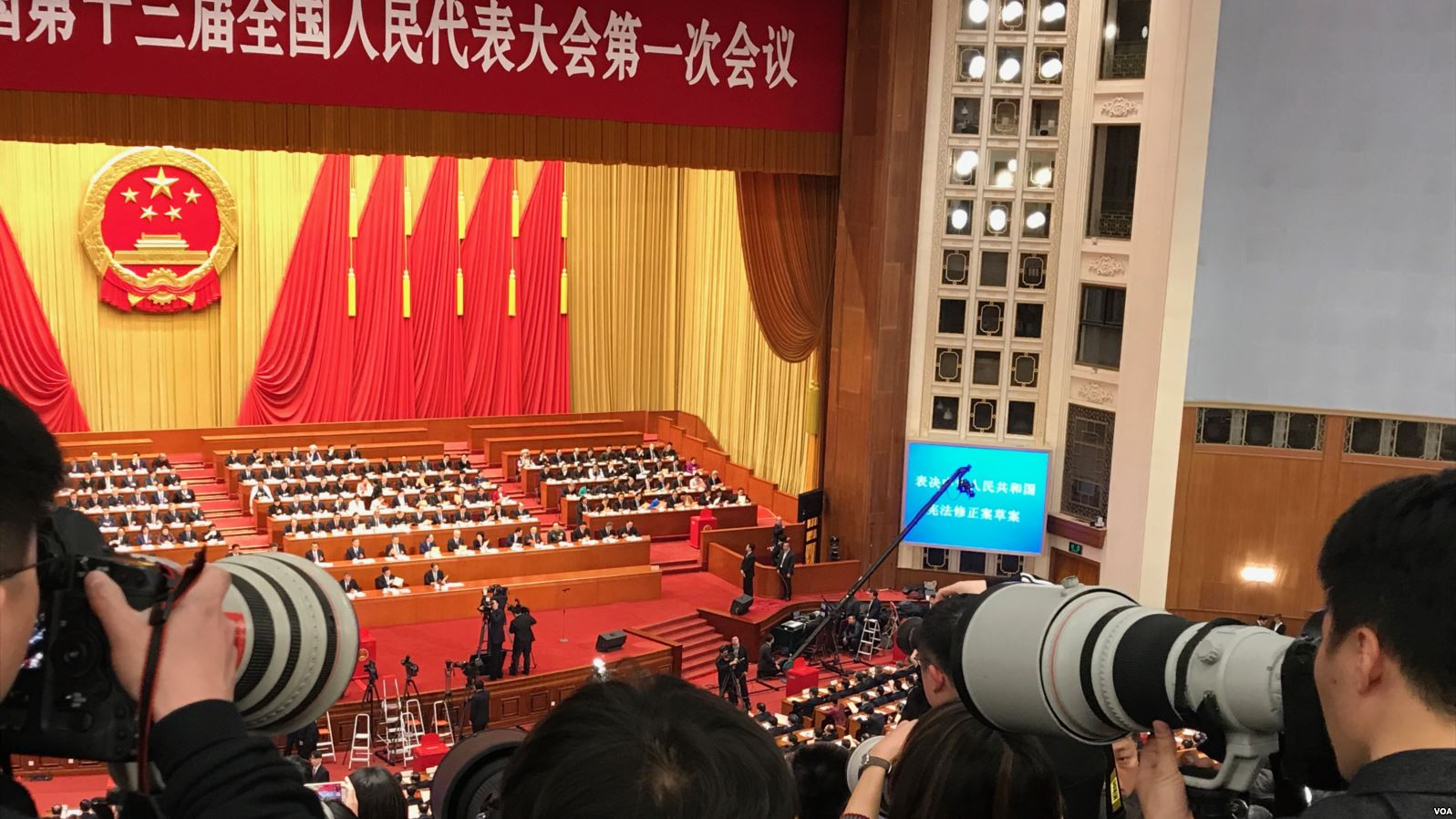
The first session of the 13th National People's Congress voting on the constitutional amendment on 11 March 2018

On 11 March 2018, the constitution was amended for the first time since 2004. The amendment included establishing the National Supervisory Commission, a new anti-graft agency, adding Hu Jintao's Scientific Outlook on Development and Xi Jinping Thought to the preamble of the constitution, and removing term limits for both the President and Vice President, enabling Xi Jinping to remain president indefinitely. Xi is also the General Secretary of the Chinese Communist Party, the top position in CCP ruling China without term limit. The amendment also restored the phrases "Communist Party of China" and its "leadership" into the main body of the constitution. Prior to the amendment, the CCP and its leadership were only mentioned in the preamble. Constitutional preambles are often not legally binding and as the legal applicability of the Chinese constitution is debated, the amendment may be seen as providing a constitutional basis for China's status as a one-party state and formally rendering any competitive multi-party system unconstitutional.

== Comparison between versions ==
Characteristic	Common Program	1954	1975	1978	1982 (original text and first to fourth amendments)	Current
Class leadership	Working class					
Main text explicitly affirms the leadership of the CCP	No		Yes		No	Yes
States that the CCP abides by the constitution	Yes					
Supreme organ of state power	Chinese People's Political Consultative Conference	National People's Congress				
The permanent body of the highest organ of state power	Central People's Government Council	Standing Committee of the National People's Congress				
Head of state	Chairman of the Central People's Government	State President	None (Note: The 1975 Constitution abolished the role of the State President; some of its corresponding functions were allocated instead to the NPCSC.)		State President	
Term limits for the head of state	None		N/A		Yes	None (Note: Term limits for the State President (not to be confused with the General Secretary of the Communist Party) were abolished in 2018.)
Head of government	Premier of the Government Administration Council of the Central People's Government	Premier of the State Council (Note: Known more simply as the Premier.)				
Term limits for the head of government	None				Yes (five years, renewable once consecutively)	
Nomination of head of government	Central People's Government Council	State President	CCP Central Committee		State President (Note: The President nominates the Premier, whose nomination must then be confirmed by a majority vote in the NPC.)	
Supreme administrative organ of the state	Government Administration Council of the Central People's Government; State Planning Commission	State Council i.e. Central People's Government				
Supreme supervisory authority of the state	None (Note: Supervisory powers are exercised by the administrative supervision department of the People's Government.)					National Supervisory Commission (Note: Established in 2018 as part of Deepening the reform of the Party and state institutions.)
Supreme judicial organ of the state	Supreme People's Court of the Central People's Government	Supreme People's Court (Note: The Supreme People's Court established under the Common Program continues to be the same one that exists today despite a different formal name. Currently it is responsible to the NPC. Under the Common Program, the SPC was subject to the leadership of the Central People's Government Council.)				
Supreme procuratorial organ of the state	Supreme People's Procuratorate of the Central People's Government (Note: Chinese: 中央人民政府最高人民检察署)	Supreme People's Procuratorate	MPS	Supreme People's Procuratorate (Note: Chinese: 最高人民检察院)		
Local administrative organs	People's Government	People's Committee	Revolutionary committee		People's Government	
Grassroots administrative organs	People's Government	People's Committee	People's Commune		People's Government	
Command of armed forces	Revolutionary Military Commission of the Central People's Government	State President	Chairman of the CCP Central Committee		Chairman of the Central Military Commission	
Explicit guarantee of human rights	No				Yes, following 2004 revision	
Explicit guarantee that all citizens are equal	Yes		No		Yes	
Explicit guarantee of migration rights	Yes		No			
Explicit guarantee of the right to strike	No		Yes		No	
Private ownership allowed	Yes		No		Yes	
Taiwan as Chinese territory	No			Yes		
Foreigners' right to asylum	Yes					

== Structure ==
The constitution consists of a preamble and 143 articles grouped into 4 chapters. These are:

- Preamble
- General Principles (Chapter 1)
- The Fundamental Rights and Duties of Citizens (Chapter 2)
- The Structure of the State (Chapter 3)
- The National Flag, the National Anthem, the National Emblem and the Capital (Chapter 4).

=== Preamble ===
The Preamble briefly introduces the history of the founding of the nation, the basic policies and fundamental national policies of the Chinese Communist Party, the basic nature and form of the state, and the effectiveness of the constitution. The preamble describes China as "a country with one of the longest histories in the world. The people of all of China's nationalities have jointly created a culture of grandeur and have a glorious revolutionary tradition." The preamble dates this revolutionary history as beginning in 1840. Regarding the founding of the PRC, it states:

After waging hard, protracted, and tortuous struggles, armed and otherwise, the Chinese people of all nationalities led by the Communist Party of China with Chairman Mao Zedong as its leader ultimately, in 1949, overthrew the rule of imperialism, feudalism, and bureaucrat-capitalism, won the great victory of the new democratic revolution and founded the People's Republic of China. Thereupon the Chinese people took state power into their own hands and became masters of the country.

It states that "Taiwan is part of the sacred territory of the People's Republic of China. It is the inviolable duty of the entire Chinese people, including our compatriots in Taiwan, to accomplish the great task of reunifying the motherland."

=== General principles (Articles 1–32) ===
Chapter 1 outlines the basic structure of the People's Republic of China, its form of government and basic national policies. Article 1 of the constitution describes the PRC as "a socialist state under the people's democratic dictatorship led by the working class and based on the alliance of workers and peasants" and establishes the socialist system as the PRC's "basic system". It states that the "defining feature of socialism with Chinese characteristics is the leadership of the Communist Party of China". It prohibits the disruption of the socialist system by "any organization or individual".

Article 2 outlines the system of people's congress, stating that "the National People's Congress and the local people's congresses at various levels are the organs through which the people exercise State power". Article 3 describes the relationship between the central government and local governments: "The division of responsibility and power between the central and local government is governed under the unified leadership of the central government, while fully encouraging the principle of local government initiative and proactivity." Elsewhere, the constitution provides for a renewed and vital role for the groups that make up that basic alliance—the Chinese People's Political Consultative Conference, democratic parties, and people's organizations.

=== The fundamental rights and duties of citizens (Articles 33–56) ===
Chapter 2 outlines the fundamental rights and duties of Chinese citizens. Article 35 of the 1982 constitution proclaims that "citizens of the People's Republic of China enjoy freedom of speech, of the press, of assembly, of association, of procession, and of demonstration." Among the political rights granted by the constitution, all Chinese citizens have rights to elect and be elected. Chinese citizens are prohibited from forming new political parties. According to the later promulgated election law, rural residents had only 1/4 vote power of townsmen (formerly 1/8). As Chinese citizens are categorized into rural resident and town resident, and the constitution has no stipulation of freedom of transference, those rural residents are restricted by the Hukou (registered permanent residence) and have fewer political, economic, and educational rights, though various reforms to the Hukou system have eased the restrictions. The aforementioned ratio of vote power has been readjusted to 1:1 by an amendment to the election law passed in March 2010.

=== The structure of the state (Articles 57–140) ===
Chapter 3 includes such state organs as the National People's Congress, the President, the State Council, the Central Military Commission, the Local People's Congresses at All Levels and Local People's Governments at All Levels, the Autonomous Organs of Ethnic Autonomous Areas, the Commissions of Supervision, and the People's Courts and People's Procuratorates.

It stipulates that the highest state administrative organ is State Council, which is responsible to the National People's Congress. The President is not responsible for government work, but can nominate the Premier of the State Council as the head of government, which is then approved by the National People's Congress. The Central Military Commission is responsible to the National People's Congress. The highest state judicial organs are the Supreme People's Court and the Supreme People's Procuratorate, which are established by the National People's Congress and are responsible to the National People's Congress.

=== The national symbols (Articles 141–143) ===
Chapter 4 specifies National Flag, the National Anthem, the National Emblem and the Capital of the People's Republic of China.

== Amendments and revisions ==
The National People's Congress (NPC) has the sole power to amend the constitution. Amendments to the constitution must be proposed by the NPC Standing Committee or one-fifth or more of the NPC deputies. In order for the Amendments to become effective, they must be passed by a two-thirds majority vote of all deputies. The NPC is also responsible for supervising the enforcement of the constitution.

The CCP leadership plays a leading role in the approval of constitutional amendments. In contrast to ordinary legislation, which the CCP leadership approves the legislation in principle, and in which the legislation is then introduced by government ministers or individual NPC delegates, constitutional amendments are drafted and debated within the party, approved by the CCP Central Committee and then presented by party deputies under the Standing Committee to the whole of the NPC during its yearly plenary session. If Congress is on recess and the Standing Committee is in session, the same process is repeated by either the party leader in the NPCSC or by one of the party deputies, but following the approval by the NPCSC, the amendments will be presented during the plenary session to all of the deputies for a final vote on the matter. If a fifth or more of the CCP party faction deputies will propose amendments either on their own or with the other parties in plenary session, the same process is applied.

In contrast to ordinary legislation, in which the Legislation Law largely directs the process, the process for constitutional revision is largely described by CCP documents; the 2014 Decision Concerning Several Major Issues in Comprehensively Advancing Governance According to Law states that "The Party Central Committee submits proposals for amending the Constitution to the National People's Congress".

== Enforcement ==
The constitution stipulates that the National People's Congress (NPC) and its Standing Committee have the power to review whether laws or activities violate the constitution. Unlike many Western legal systems, courts do not have the power of judicial review and cannot invalidate a statute on the grounds that it violates the constitution.

Since 2002, a special committee within the NPC called the Constitution and Law Committee has been responsible for constitutional review and enforcement. The committee has never explicitly ruled that a law or regulation is unconstitutional. However, in one case, after media outcry over the death of Sun Zhigang the State Council was forced to rescind regulations allowing police to detain persons without residency permits after the Standing Committee of the National People's Congress (NPCSC) made it clear that it would rule such regulations unconstitutional.

== Analysis ==
Though technically the "supreme legal authority" and "fundamental law of the state", the ruling Chinese Communist Party (CCP) has a documented history of violating many of the constitution's provisions and censoring calls for greater adherence to it. In early 2013, a movement developed among reformers in China based on enforcing the provisions of the constitution.

In 2018, Suzuki Ken of Meiji University wrote that "With authority thus concentrated in the hands of a single individual, the law becomes little more than an expedient, a tool to be applied (or not) according to the interests or whims of the individual in power." In 2019, Ling Li of the University of Vienna and Wenzhang Zhou of Zhejiang University wrote that "the constitution appeals to [the CCP] because it does not provide solutions to fundamental issues of governance. Instead, such issues are kept out of the constitution so that they can be addressed by the Party through other regulatory mechanisms outside of the constitutional realm."

== See also ==
- Constitutional history of the People's Republic of China
- Constitution of the Republic of China
- History of the People's Republic of China
- Politics of China
- Law of the People's Republic of China
- Constitution of the Chinese Communist Party
