= Four Confidences =

Chinese Communist Party concept

The Four Confidences (Chinese: 四个自信) is a political concept by Chinese Communist Party (CCP) general secretary Xi Jinping. The concept includes "Confidence in Path, (Note: 道路自信) Confidence in Theories, (Note: 理论自信) Confidence in System, (Note: 制度自信) and Confidence in Culture." (Note: 文化自信) In 2021, the concept was expanded to include the idea of Historical Confidence.

== History ==
The doctrine was first discussed at the 18th National Congress of the Chinese Communist Party held in November 2012 in a speech by then party General Secretary Hu Jintao, and the doctrine was termed the Three Confidences (三个自信). The origin of the theory is said to be Yi Junqing, an official later disgraced for corruption who served as the head of the Compilation and Translation Bureau. Xi Jinping added a 'fourth' confidence, "confidence in our culture," in December 2014. Along with the Four Comprehensives and the Chinese Dream, it has, since 2013, become a central theme in political slogans of the CCP, often recited at official meetings, conferences, and by state-owned media.

In 2017, the 19th CCP National Congress added the Four Confidences to the CCP's constitution, inserting "firm confidence in its path, theory, system, and culture," along with other doctrines proposed by Xi Jinping.

According to several portraits of Xi by both domestic and foreign observers, Xi Jinping has a deeply held belief that the CCP and the institutions it has created is the best institution to govern China and the best institution to guide China's development.

In 2021, the idea of "historical confidence" was added.

== Doctrine ==
=== Characteristics ===
Four matters of confidence refer to confidence in the path, theory, system, and culture of socialism with Chinese characteristics. According to an official translation:

"Confidence in its path" is confidence in the direction of development of socialism with Chinese characteristics and confidence in its future;

"Confidence in its theory" is confidence in the scientific nature... of the theory of socialism with Chinese characteristics;

"Confidence in its system" is confidence in the advanced and superior nature of the system of Chinese socialism;

"Confidence in its culture" is a full affirmation of the value of China's own culture and a faith in its vitality.

These four form an organic whole; they provide a complete conceptual system of socialism with Chinese characteristics.

== See also ==
- Ideology of the Chinese Communist Party
- Xi Jinping Thought
