= Provisions on the Governance of the Online Information Content Ecosystem =

2020 Chinese government decree

- Passed: 20 December 2019
- Commenced: 1 March 2020
- Introduced by: Cyberspace Administration of China
- Status: In force

Provisions on the Governance of the Online Information Content Ecosystem
- Simplified Chinese: 网络信息内容生态治理规定
- Traditional Chinese: 網路資訊內容生態治理規定
Transcriptions
Standard Mandarin
- Hanyu Pinyin: Wǎngluò Xìnxī Nèiróng Shēngtài Zhìlǐ Guīdìng

The Provisions on the Governance of the Online Information Content Ecosystem is a regulation of the People's Republic of China that came into effect on March 1, 2020. The Provisions defines the scope of legal expression for service platforms and content creators, while also encouraging them to create content that conforms to China's official values. It also strictly prohibits online violence, human flesh searches, and account manipulation.

== History ==
The Provisions came into effect on March 1, 2020. It mentions that its purpose is to "cultivate and practice the core socialist values", "take online information content as the main governance object", and "establish and improve a comprehensive network governance system, create a clean and clear cyberspace, and build a good network ecology". The "interpretation" article published by the Cyberspace Administration of China pointed out that the formulation of the Regulations reflects the requirements put forward by the fourth plenary session of the 19th Central Committee of the Chinese Communist Party to "establish and improve a comprehensive network governance system, strengthen and innovate Internet content construction, implement the main responsibility of Internet companies for information management, comprehensively improve network governance capabilities, and create a clean and clear cyberspace". It also quoted the remarks of General Secretary of the Chinese Communist Party Xi Jinping that "the chaotic cyberspace and deteriorating ecology are not in the interests of the people", and believed that the Provisions are in line with the development concept of "putting people first".

== Content ==
Compared with the regulations formulated by the Cyberspace Administration of China in the past, the requirements of the Provisions on the Governance of the Online Information Content Ecosystem are more targeted and strict than before. Regarding the self-censorship of content platforms that has always existed, the "Provisions" also upgraded the previous "requirement for self-discipline" to explicit provisions.

The Provisions require that online content creators "shall not" produce, copy or publish the following content:

- Opposing the basic principles established by the Constitution;
- Endangering national security, leaking state secrets, subverting state power, or undermining national unity;
- Damaging national honor and interests;
- Distorting, vilifying, blaspheming, or denying the deeds and spirit of heroes and martyrs, or insulting, slandering, or otherwise infringing upon the names, portraits, reputations, and honors of heroes and martyrs;
- Propagating terrorism, extremism, or inciting the commission of terrorist or extremist activities;
- Inciting ethnic hatred, ethnic discrimination, and undermining ethnic unity;
- Undermining the state's religious policies and promote evil cults and feudal superstitions;
- Spreading rumors and disrupting economic and social order;
- Spreading obscenity, pornography, gambling, violence, murder, terror, or inciting crime;
- Insulting or defaming others, infringing upon others' reputation, privacy, or other legitimate rights and interests;
- Other content prohibited by laws and administrative regulations.

The Provisions require content platforms to "prevent and resist" the following content:

- Using exaggerated titles, the content of which is seriously inconsistent with the title;
- Hype up gossip, scandal, bad deeds, etc.;
- Inappropriate comments on natural disasters, major accidents and other disasters;
- Containing sexual hints, sexual provocations, etc. that may easily cause people to have sexual associations;
- Content that is bloody, thrilling, cruel, or otherwise causes physical or mental discomfort;
- Inciting discrimination against groups of people, regions, etc.;
- Propagating vulgar, banal, and kitsch content;
- May cause minors to imitate unsafe behaviors and behaviors that violate social ethics, or induce minors to develop bad habits;
- Other content that has a negative impact on the network ecology.

The Provisions encourage online content creators to produce, copy and publish the following content:

- Publicize Xi Jinping Thought on Socialism with Chinese Characteristics for a New Era, and comprehensively, accurately and vividly interpret the path, theory, system and culture of socialism with Chinese characteristics;
- Publicizing the Party's theories, lines, principles, policies, and major decisions and arrangements of the Central Committee;
- Showing highlights of economic and social development and reflecting the great struggles and passionate lives of the people;
- Carry forward the core socialist values, publicize excellent moral culture and the spirit of the times, and fully demonstrate the high-spirited spirit of the Chinese nation;
- Effectively respond to social concerns, resolve doubts, analyze issues and help guide the masses to reach a consensus;
- It is helpful to enhance the international influence of Chinese culture and show the world a real, three-dimensional and comprehensive China;
- Other content talks about taste, style, responsibility, eulogizes truth, goodness and beauty, and promotes unity and stability.

The Provisions state that online information content service platforms should establish an online information content ecological governance mechanism, improve systems such as information release review, comment review, real-time inspection, emergency response and online rumor prevention, and if illegal information is found, immediate measures should be taken in accordance with the law, relevant records should be kept, and reports should be made to the relevant competent authorities. The Provisions also propose that a user account credit management system should be established to provide corresponding services based on the credit status of user accounts.
