= Two No Walks =

Chinese political term

Two No Walks (Chinese: 两个不走), also known as "not taking the old and evil paths" (Chinese: 既不走封闭僵化的老路、也不走改旗易帜的邪路), is a political term put forward by the Chinese Communist Party in 2012. It means "neither taking the old path of closure and rigidity nor the evil path of changing flags and changing banners", in order to safeguard the leadership of the CCP and the path of socialism with Chinese characteristics.

== History ==
In November 2012, CCP General Secretary Hu Jintao proposed in his report to the 18th CCP National Congress that “we must unswervingly hold high the great banner of socialism with Chinese characteristics, and neither follow the old path of closed-door and rigid development nor the evil path of changing the banner.” The People’s Daily commented that this is an adherence to and emphasis on the theoretical system of socialism with Chinese characteristics (Deng Xiaoping Theory, the Three Represents and the Scientific Outlook on Development).

In October 2017, CCP General Secretary Xi Jinping said in his report to the 19th CCP National Congress that “the whole Party must more consciously enhance its confidence in its path, theory, system, and culture, and avoid taking the old path of closed-door and rigid development, or the evil path of changing its flag and changing its banner. We must maintain political resolve, persist in hard work to build the country, and always uphold and develop socialism with Chinese characteristics.” On January 5, 2018, he emphasized again that “the 19th CCP National Congress made the important political judgment that socialism with Chinese characteristics has entered a new era. We must realize that this new era is a new era of socialism with Chinese characteristics, and not some other new era.”

In 2021, the Resolution on the Major Achievements and Historical Experiences of the Party's Century of Struggle pointed out that "as long as we neither follow the old path of closure and rigidity nor the evil path of changing flags and changing banners, and unswervingly follow the path of socialism with Chinese characteristics, we will definitely be able to build our country into a prosperous, democratic, civilized, harmonious and beautiful socialist modern country." In October 2022, General Secretary Xi Jinping said in his report to the 20th CCP National Congress that “we will neither follow the old path of closed-door and rigid development nor the evil path of changing our flag and changing our banner. We will persist in basing the development of our country and nation on our own strength and firmly grasp the destiny of China’s development and progress in our own hands.”
