= Xi Jinping Thought =

Set of policies and ideals from Xi Jinping

Xi Jinping Thought on Socialism; with Chinese Characteristics; for a New Era
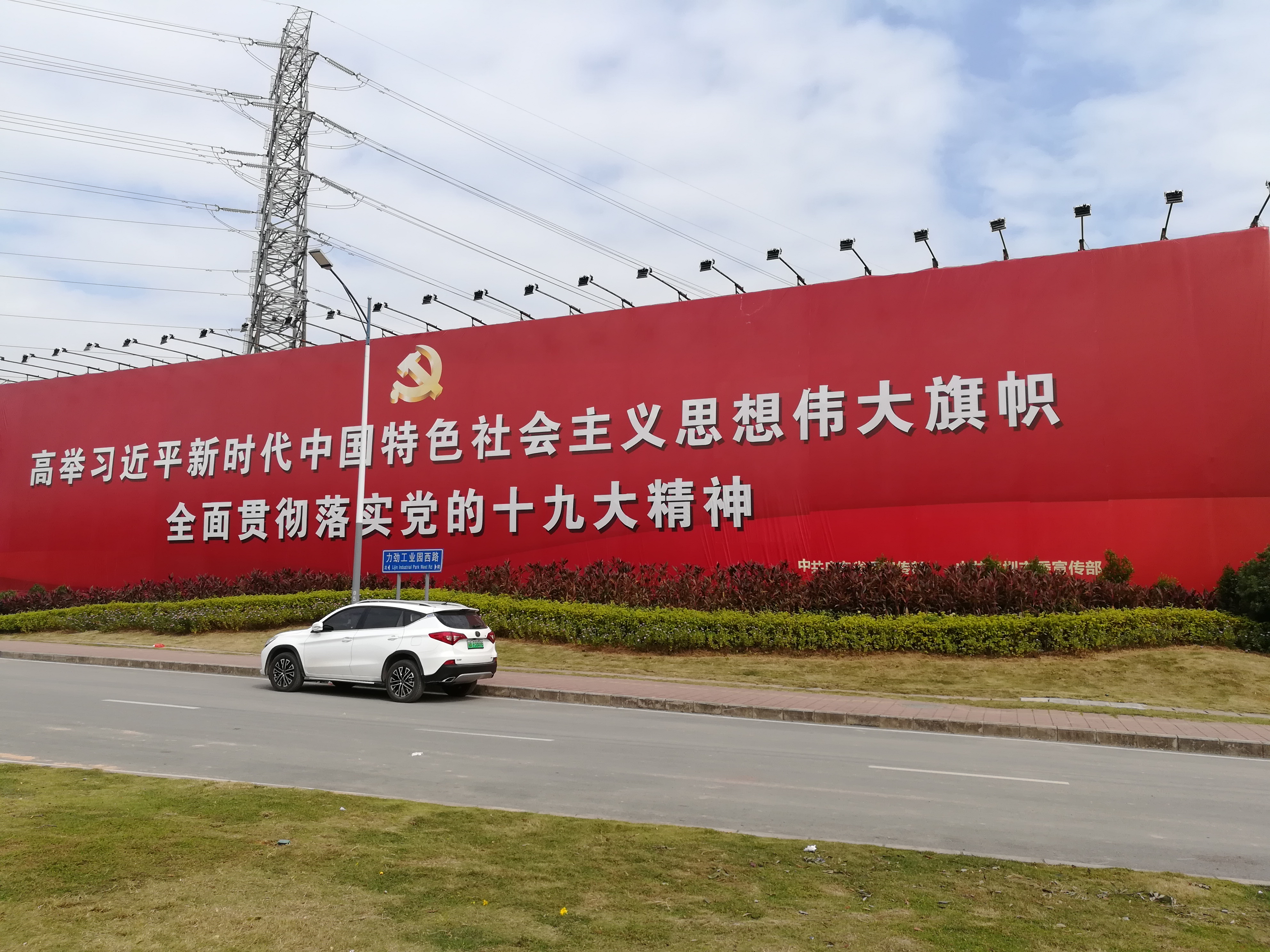
- A billboard advertising Xi Jinping Thought in Shenzhen, Guangdong, with the emblem of the Chinese Communist Party
- Simplified Chinese: 习近平新时代中国特色社会主义思想
- Traditional Chinese: 習近平新時代中國特色社會主義思想
Transcriptions
Standard Mandarin
- Hanyu Pinyin: Xí Jìnpíng xīn shídài Zhōngguó tèsè shèhuì zhǔyì sīxiǎng
- Bopomofo: ㄒㄧˊ ㄐㄧㄣˋ ㄆㄧㄥˊ ㄒㄧㄣ ㄕˊ ㄉㄞˋ ㄓㄨㄥ ㄍㄨㄛˊ ㄊㄜˋ ㄙㄜˋ ㄕㄜˋ ㄏㄨㄟˋ ㄓㄨˇ ㄧˋ ㄙ ㄒㄧㄤˊ
- Wade–Giles: Hsi^{2} Chin^{4}-p'ing^{2} hsin^{1} shih^{2}-tai^{4} Chung^{1}-kuo^{2} t'e^{4}-se^{4} she^{4}-hui^{4} chu^{3}-i^{4} ssu^{1}-hsiang^{3}
- IPA: [ɕǐ tɕîn.pʰǐŋ ɕín ʂɻ̩̌.tâɪ ʈʂʊ́ŋ.kwǒ tʰɤ̂.sɤ̂ ʂ]

Xi Jinping Thought on Socialism with Chinese Characteristics for a New Era, commonly abbreviated outside China as Xi Jinping Thought or Xi-ism, is a political doctrine created during the general secretaryship of Xi Jinping of the Chinese Communist Party (CCP).

In January 2013, Xi's speeches at the CCP's 18th National Congress in 2012 were collectively termed "General Secretary Xi Jinping's Series of Important Speeches", followed by a campaign within the CCP to study Xi's speeches. These developed into Xi Jinping Thought, which was first officially mentioned at the CCP's 19th National Congress in 2017 when it was incorporated into the CCP constitution. In 2018, at the first session of the 13th National People's Congress, the preamble of the state constitution was amended to mention Xi Jinping Thought.

According to the CCP, Xi Jinping Thought "builds on and further enriches" previous iterations of CCP ideology and has also been called as the "Marxism of contemporary China and of the 21st century" and "a new breakthrough in the Sinicization of Marxism". It is a component of the theoretical system of socialism with Chinese characteristics and the development of Marxism–Leninism, Mao Zedong Thought, Deng Xiaoping Theory, the Three Represents and the Scientific Outlook on Development. The theory's main elements are summarized in the ten affirmations, the fourteen commitments, the thirteen areas of achievements, and the six musts.

== Terminology ==
In official CCP discourse, Xi Jinping Thought is referred to as "Xi Jinping Thought on Socialism with Chinese Characteristics for a New Era", or Xi Jinping Thought on a specific field, such as Xi Jinping Thought on Diplomacy. The CCP defines the "New Era of Socialism with Chinese Characteristics" as historical period of China beginning from 2012 after its 18th National Congress. The CCP says that the new era is "both consistent with and significantly different from the development of the past nearly 40 years of reform and opening up". In English foreign media, "Xi Jinping Thought" is the most common usage, with others including Xi Thought and Xiism.

== History and development ==
"Xi Jinping Thought on socialism with Chinese characteristics for a new era" was formally launched at the 19th National Congress of the Chinese Communist Party having gradually been developed since 2012, when Xi became general secretary of the Chinese Communist Party. News sources have stated that Xi helped create this ideology together with his close advisor, then director of the Central Policy Research Office Wang Huning. The first indications of Xi's platform had come out in a speech titled "Some Questions on Maintaining and Developing Socialism with Chinese Characteristics" given to the newly elected Central Committee on 5 January 2013, and was later published by Central Documents Press and the journal Qiushi.

=== Speech at the 18th National Congress ===
Much of Xi Jinping Thought comes from Xi's 2013 speech delivered at the 18th National Congress of the Chinese Communist Party, delivered a month after he became the CCP General Secretary. Beginning his speech, Xi said:

First of all: Socialism with Chinese characteristics is socialism, not any other "ism." The guiding principles of scientific socialism thus cannot be abandoned. Our Party has always emphasized adherence to the basic principles of scientific socialism, but adapted to the particular conditions of China. This means that socialism with Chinese characteristics is socialism, not some other doctrine... It was Marxism–Leninism and Mao Zedong Thought that guided the Chinese people out of the long night and established a New China, and it was socialism with Chinese characteristics that led to the rapid development of China.

According to Xi, "the consolidation and development of the socialist system will require its own long period of history... it will require the tireless struggle of generations, up to ten generations." On the relationship with capitalist nations, Xi said, "Marx and Engels' analysis of the basic contradictions in capitalist society is not outdated, nor is the historical materialist view that capitalism is bound to die out and socialism is bound to win." Xi also stated: "The fundamental reason why some of our comrades have weak ideals and faltering beliefs is that their views lack a firm grounding in historical materialism."

Xi showed great interest in why the Soviet Union dissolved, and how to avoid that failure in China:

Why did the Soviet Union disintegrate? Why did the Communist Party of the Soviet Union fall from power? An important reason was that the struggle in the field of ideology was extremely intense, completely negating the history of the Soviet Union, negating the history of the Communist Party of the Soviet Union, negating Lenin, negating Stalin, creating historical nihilism and confused thinking. Party organs at all levels had lost their functions, the military was no longer under Party leadership. In the end, the Communist Party of the Soviet Union, a great party, was scattered, the Soviet Union, a great socialist country, disintegrated. This is a cautionary tale!

In January 2013, Politburo Standing Committee member Liu Yunshan referred to Xi's speech as the "General Secretary Xi Jinping's Series of Important Speeches". This was followed by Organization Department Director Zhao Leji and CCP General Office Director Li Zhanshu ordering provincial and ministerial officials to study Xi's speeches. In November 2013, Liu announced that the Central Party School would launch a training program on General Secretary Xi Jinping's whole series of important remarks; by 2014, seven cohorts of provincial cadres, numbering 2,300, had completed the program. Liu's announcement was followed by a meeting by Li Zhansu regarding the speech for heads of the party units directly under the Central Committee.

In June 2014, the CCP's Publicity Department published Reader of General Secretary Xi Jinping's Series of Important Speeches, which the Publicity and Organization Departments ordered to be mandatory, leading party schools and universities to incorporate the book into their curricula. The concepts were further elaborated in Xi's The Governance of China book series, published by the Foreign Languages Press for an international audience. Volume one was published in September 2014, followed by volume two in November 2017, followed by volume three in June 2020, followed by volume four in July 2022. Xi has praised Karl Marx as "the greatest thinker of modern times" whose teachings enlightened the working classes of the world and has called upon party cadres to adopt Marxist revolutionary principles as a "way of life".

Socialism with Chinese characteristics is the dialectical unity of the theoretical logic of scientific socialism and the historical logic of China’s social development. It is a scientific socialism rooted in China’s soil, one that reflects the aspirations of the Chinese people, and one that is adapted to the conditions of progress in our times. It is the only way to comprehensively build a prosperous society, accelerate socialist modernization and realize the great rejuvenation of the Chinese nation.

— Xi Jinping, "Uphold and Develop Socialism with Chinese Characteristics", January 5th, 2013,

At the fourth plenum of the 18th Central Committee in October 2014, CCP members were required to "implement deeply the spirit of General Secretary Xi Jinping's series of important remarks". In October 2015, at the fifth plenum of the 18th Central Committee, Xi introduced "new visions, new thoughts, and new strategies for governing the country and administrating the regime". In February 2016, the Central Committee announced the "Two Studies and One Action" campaign, which asked all CCP members "to study the Party Constitution and rules, and speeches of Xi Jinping, and to become qualified Party members". In February 2017, at a meeting of the CCP General Office, Li Zhanshu Xi's visions, thoughts and strategies "have already preliminarily become a complete theoretical system". In May 2017, Liu Yushan said that General Secretary Xi Jinping's whole series of important remarks were "the latest achievement of the theoretical system of socialism with Chinese characteristics" and "latest development of Marxism in modern China". The first public usage of Xi Jinping sixiang ("Xi Jinping Thought") came in 2017 when Liu Mingfu and Wang Zhongyuan published a book by that name.

=== Speech at the 19th National Congress ===
Xi first used the phrase "Thought on Socialism with Chinese Characteristics for a New Era" in his speech delivered on the opening day of the 19th Party Congress in October 2017. The Politburo Standing Committee then prepended "Xi Jinping" to the phrase, in their review of his speech. The Congress then affirmed Xi's speech as a guiding political and military ideology of the Chinese Communist Party and approved its incorporation into the constitution of the party, with unanimous support in a show of hands. The incorporation made Xi the third Chinese leader (after Mao Zedong and Deng Xiaoping) to have their names incorporated into the list of fundamental doctrines of the CCP. This demonstrated that Xi was more influential than his two predecessors as General Secretary (Hu Jintao and Jiang Zemin). Xi promised to make China strong, propelling the country into a "new era". He stated that the primary contradiction of China's conditions in the new era as "the contradiction between the people's ever-growing need for a better life and unbalanced and inadequate development." In this context, "unbalanced" refers to rural-urban inequalities, regional inequalities, inequalities between the rich and poor, and structural imbalances in the economy. "Inadequate" refers to household income share.

At the first session of the 13th National People's Congress on 11 March 2018, the preamble of the Constitution of China was amended to mention Xi Jinping Thought. In September 2018, the Two Upholds, referring to "resolutely uphold the status of General Party Secretary Xi Jinping as the core of the Party Central and the whole party, as well as the Party Central's authority and centralized and unified leadership", was first put forward. In 2021, the sixth plenary session of the 19th Central Committee of the Chinese Communist Party approved of the Resolution on the Major Achievements and Historical Experience of the Party over the Past Century, which declared Xi Jinping Thought "a new breakthrough in the Sinicization of Marxism". The document says the Thought is the "Marxism of contemporary China and of the 21st century and embodies the best Chinese culture and ethos of this era". It also for the first time credited Xi as being the "main innovator" of Xi Jinping Thought. The document put forward the Two Establishments, referring to "establish the status of comrade Xi Jinping as the core of the Party Central and the whole party" and "establish the guiding status of Xi Jinping Thought on socialism with Chinese characteristics for a new era".

== Content ==
Xi Jinping, for whom the political thought is named

Xi Jinping Thought is a component of the theoretical system of socialism with Chinese characteristics. In official party documentation and pronouncements by Xi's colleagues, the thought has been said to be a continuation of previous party ideologues, and it "builds on and further enriches" Marxism–Leninism, Mao Zedong Thought, Deng Xiaoping Theory, the Theory of Three Represents and the Scientific Outlook on Development as part of a series of guiding ideologies that embody "Marxism adapted to Chinese conditions".

Xi Jinping Thought is summarized into the ten affirmations (十个明确), the fourteen commitments (十四个坚持), and the thirteen areas of achievements (十三个方面成就). Additionally, the six musts (六个必须坚持) are the worldview and methodology of Xi Jinping Thought, while the Two Establishments embody the most important political achievements since the 18th CCP National Congress.

=== Ten affirmations ===
During his speech to the 19th CCP National Congress, Xi Jinping introduced the "eight affirmations" (八个明确), which later developed to the "ten affirmations" with the addition of the 7th and 10th points during the sixth plenum of the 19th Central Committee in 2021. The ten affirmations are:

1. Affirm that the most essential feature of socialism with Chinese characteristics is the leadership of the Chinese Communist Party, the greatest advantage of the system of socialism with Chinese characteristics is the leadership of the Chinese Communist Party, the Chinese Communist Party is the highest political leadership force, and the entire Party must strengthen its "Four Consciousnesses", firm up its "Four Confidences", and achieve "Two Upholds".
2. Affirm that we must clearly uphold and develop socialism with Chinese characteristics. Our overall task is to realize socialist modernization and the great rejuvenation of the Chinese nation. On the basis of building a moderately prosperous society in all respects, we will take two steps to build a great modern socialist country that is prosperous, strong, democratic, culturally advanced, harmonious and beautiful by the middle of this century, and promote the great rejuvenation of the Chinese nation through Chinese-style modernization.
3. Affirm that the principal contradiction facing Chinese society in the new era is the contradiction between the people's ever-growing needs for a better life and unbalanced and inadequate development. We must adhere to the people-centered development philosophy, develop people's democracy throughout the entire process, and promote more significant and substantial progress in the all-round development of people and the common prosperity of all the people.
4. Affirm that the overall layout of the cause of socialism with Chinese characteristics is a five-pronged approach encompassing economic, political, cultural, social, and ecological progress, while the strategic layout consists of four comprehensive initiatives: building a modern socialist country in all respects, deepening reform in all respects, governing the country according to law in all respects, and strengthening Party discipline in all respects.
5. Affirm that the overall goal of comprehensively deepening reform is to improve and develop the system of socialism with Chinese characteristics and to modernize the national governance system and governance capacity.
6. Affirm that the overall goal of comprehensively advancing the rule of law is to build a socialist rule of law system with Chinese characteristics and a socialist rule of law state.
7. Affirm that we must uphold and improve the basic socialist economic system, allow the market to play a decisive role in resource allocation, better leverage the role of the government, grasp the new stage of development, implement the new development philosophy of innovation, coordination, green development, openness, and sharing, accelerate the construction of a new development pattern with the domestic cycle as the mainstay and the domestic and international cycles mutually reinforcing each other, promote high-quality development, and coordinate development and security.
8. Affirm that the Party's goal for building a strong military in the new era is to build a people's army that obeys the Party's command, is capable of winning battles, and has an excellent style of work, and to build the people's army into a world-class military.
9. Affirm that China's major-country diplomacy with Chinese characteristics should serve national rejuvenation, promote human progress, advance the building of a new type of international relations, and promote the building of a community with a shared future for mankind.
10. Affirm that the strategic policy of comprehensively and strictly governing the Party, puts forward the general requirements for Party building in the new era, comprehensively promotes the Party's political, ideological, organizational, style, and disciplinary building, integrates institutional building throughout, deepens the anti-corruption struggle, implements the political responsibility of governing the Party, and leads the great social revolution with the great self-revolution.

=== Fourteen commitments ===
During his speech to the 19th CCP National Congress, Xi Jinping introduced the fourteen commitments. They are:

1. Ensuring Party leadership over all forms of work in China.
2. Committing to a people-centered approach.
3. Continuing the comprehensive deepening of reforms.
4. Adopting new science-based ideas for "innovative, coordinated, green, open and shared development".
5. Following socialism with Chinese characteristics with people as the masters of the country.
6. Governing China with the Rule of Law.
7. Practising socialist core values, including Marxism–Leninism and socialism with Chinese characteristics.
8. "Improving people's livelihood and well-being is the primary goal of development".
9. Coexisting well with nature with "energy conservation and environmental protection" policies and "contribute to global ecological safety".
10. Strengthening the national security of China.
11. Upholding absolute Party leadership over the People's Liberation Army.
12. Promoting the one country, two systems system for Hong Kong and Macau with a future of "complete national reunification" and to follow the One-China principle and 1992 Consensus for Taiwan.
13. Establishing a common destiny between the Chinese people and other peoples around the world with a "peaceful international environment".
14. Exercising "full and rigorous governance" over the CCP.

=== Thirteen achievements ===
The thirteen achievements was first put forward at the Resolution on the Major Achievements and Historical Experience of the Party over the Past Century approved by the sixth plenary session of the 19th CCP Central Committee in 2021. The thirteen achievements are:

1. In upholding the Party's overall leadership
2. In comprehensively and strictly governing the party
3. In economic construction
4. In comprehensively deepening reform and opening up
5. In political construction
6. In comprehensively governing the country according to the law
7. In cultural constructions
8. In social construction
9. In the construction of ecological civilization
10. In national defense and army building
11. In safeguarding national security
12. In adhering to one country, two systems and promoting reunification of the motherland
13. In diplomatic work

=== Six musts ===
The "six musts" were first put forward at the 20th CCP National Congress in October 2022. It conveys the methods and worldview of the CCP. It outlines that the CCP:

1. Must put the people first: meaning that theories that depart from the people are "pale and feeble", and those that do not bring prosperity to the people "have no vitality".
2. Must be self-confident and independent: meaning that China must have a "firm faith" in the tenets of socialism, and a "firm belief" in Xi Jinping Thought. This includes the Four Confidences.
3. Must uphold the principle of integrity and innovation: meaning the importance of science and having a scientific attitude toward problems, as well as emphasizing the pursuit of truth.
4. Must be problem-oriented: meaning the need to "raise new concepts, new thoughts, and new methods that can truly resolve issues".
5. Must adhere to a systematic approach: meaning the CCP must think and act systematically, adhering to seven types of "thinking" in its work, including: "strategic thinking"; "historical thinking"; "dialectical thinking"; "systematic thinking"; "innovative thinking"; "rule of law thinking"; and "bottom-line thinking".
6. Must have a global vision: meaning that China and the CCP must expand their "global view", and must "answer the concerns of the people of various nations" (各国人民普遍关切) as that China's core interests are interconnected with those of the world and that China can contribute to solving the most pressing issues facing the world.

=== Components ===
Xi Jinping Thought is divided into several main components, including:

- Xi Jinping Thought on Culture: Established during the National Conference on Publicity, Ideology and Cultural Work in October 2023, it aims to guide propaganda, ideological, and cultural work during the new era. It promotes the Two Integrations, namely integrating the basic principles of Marxism with China's specific reality and with China's traditional culture, upholding the Party's leadership over cultural work, as well as cultural confidence.
- Xi Jinping Thought on Diplomacy: Established during the Central Conference on Work Relating to Foreign Affairs in June 2018, it aims to guide diplomatic work during the new era. It promotes China having a major-country diplomacy with Chinese characteristics, calling to build of a community of common destiny for humankind. It calls for efforts to promote global cooperation and global governance reform, as well as upholding China's core interests and national sovereignty. It includes advancing the Belt and Road Initiative, as well as promoting the Global Development Initiative (GDI), the Global Security Initiative (GSI), the Global Civilisation Initiative (GCI), and the Global Governance Initiative (GGI).
- Xi Jinping Thought on Ecological Civilization: Established during the National Ecological and Environmental Protection Conference in May 2018, it aims to guide ecological work in the new era. It calls for the harmonious coexistence of human and nature, promoting the slogan that clear waters and green mountains are invaluable assets, and calls for greater ecological protection.
- Xi Jinping Thought on Economy: Established during the Central Economic Work Conference in December 2017, it aims to guide economic work in the new era. It puts development at the core of policy, using the new concept for development to guide policy, and build a new development pattern. It calls for China to adhere to high-quality development, improve the socialist basic economic system, emphasize manufacturing and the real economy, continue reform and opening up, and balance development and security.
- Xi Jinping Thought on the Rule of Law: Established during the Central Conference on Comprehensively Promoting the Rule of Law in November 2020, it aims to guide legal work during the new era. It affirms Party leadership over legal work and calls for adhering to the socialist rule of law with Chinese characteristics.
- Xi Jinping Thought on Strengthening the Military: Established during the 19th Party National Congress in October 2017, it aims to guide military work during the new era. It emphasizes the absolute leadership of the Party over the military and calls for strengthening the armed forces to create a "people's army that obeys the Party's command, can win battles, and has a good style of work".
- Xi Jinping Thought on Party Building: Established during the National Conference on Party building in June 2026, it aims to guide Party building in the new era. It emphasizes that the "leadership of the Party is the most essential feature of socialism with Chinese characteristics".

It also includes several "important thoughts":

- General Secretary Xi Jinping's important Thoughts on the Party's Self-revolution: Established during the third plenary session of the 20th Central Commission for Discipline Inspection, it aims to answer "why our Party needs to carry out self-revolution, why it can carry out self-revolution, and how to promote self-revolution". It is summarized to the nine requirements.
- General Secretary Xi Jinping's Important Thoughts on Upholding and Improving the System of People's Congresses. Established during the Central Conference on People's Congress Work in October 2021, it aims to explain the "general direction, principles and rationale for the construction of the system of people's congress and the work of the people's congress". It is summarized to the eight must-adhere to.
- General Secretary Xi Jinping's Important Thoughts on Strengthening and Improving the Work of the Chinese People's Political Consultative Conference: Established at the celebration of the 75th anniversary of the founding of the Chinese People's Political Consultative Conference in September 2024, it aims to guide the work of the Chinese People's Political Consultative Conference in the new era. It is summarized to the ten principles.
- General Secretary Xi Jinping's Important Thoughts on Doing a Good Job in the Party's United Front Work in the New Era: Established during the Central United Front Work Conference in July 2022, it aims to guide united front work during the new era. It is summarized to the twelve musts.
- General Secretary Xi Jinping's Important Thoughts on Strengthening and Improving Ethnic Affairs: Established during the Central Conference on Ethnic Affairs in August 2021, it aims to guide the Party's ethnic affairs work in the new era. It is composed of the twelve musts.
- General Secretary Xi Jinping's Important Thoughts on Building a Cyber Power: Established during the National Conference on Cybersecurity and Informatization in April 2018, it aims to guide cybersecurity and informatization work as well as managing and governing the internet in the new era. It is summarized in the five clear points.
- General Secretary Xi Jinping's Important Thoughts on Strengthening and Improving the Work of Handling Public Petitions: It aims to guide petitioning work, and established by the Regulations on Petitions and Complaints, which came into effect in May 2022.

=== Other ===
Xi Jinping Thought seeks to reinvigorate the mass line. The Thought includes the theoretical system of Chinese modernization, promoting CCP's economic and political development model and contrasts with what the CCP terms "Western-style development." The concept of holistic national security is also a part of Xi Jinping Thought. In economic matters, Xi Jinping Thought highlights the historical importance of state-owned enterprises:

[W]ithout the important material foundation that state-owned enterprises have laid for China's development over a long period of time, without the major innovations and key core technologies achieved by state-owned enterprises, and without state-owned enterprises' long-term commitment to a large number of social responsibilities, there would be no economic independence and national security for China, no continuous improvement in people's lives, and no socialist China standing tall in the East of the world.

While regarding private businesses, it emphasizes:

The private economy is the main form of economic organization of the non-public economy, an important achievement in the development of the socialist market economy, and an important force in promoting the development of the socialist market economy...the private economy has become the main space for entrepreneurship and employment, an important domain for technological innovation, and an important source of national taxation revenue.

== Influence and reception ==
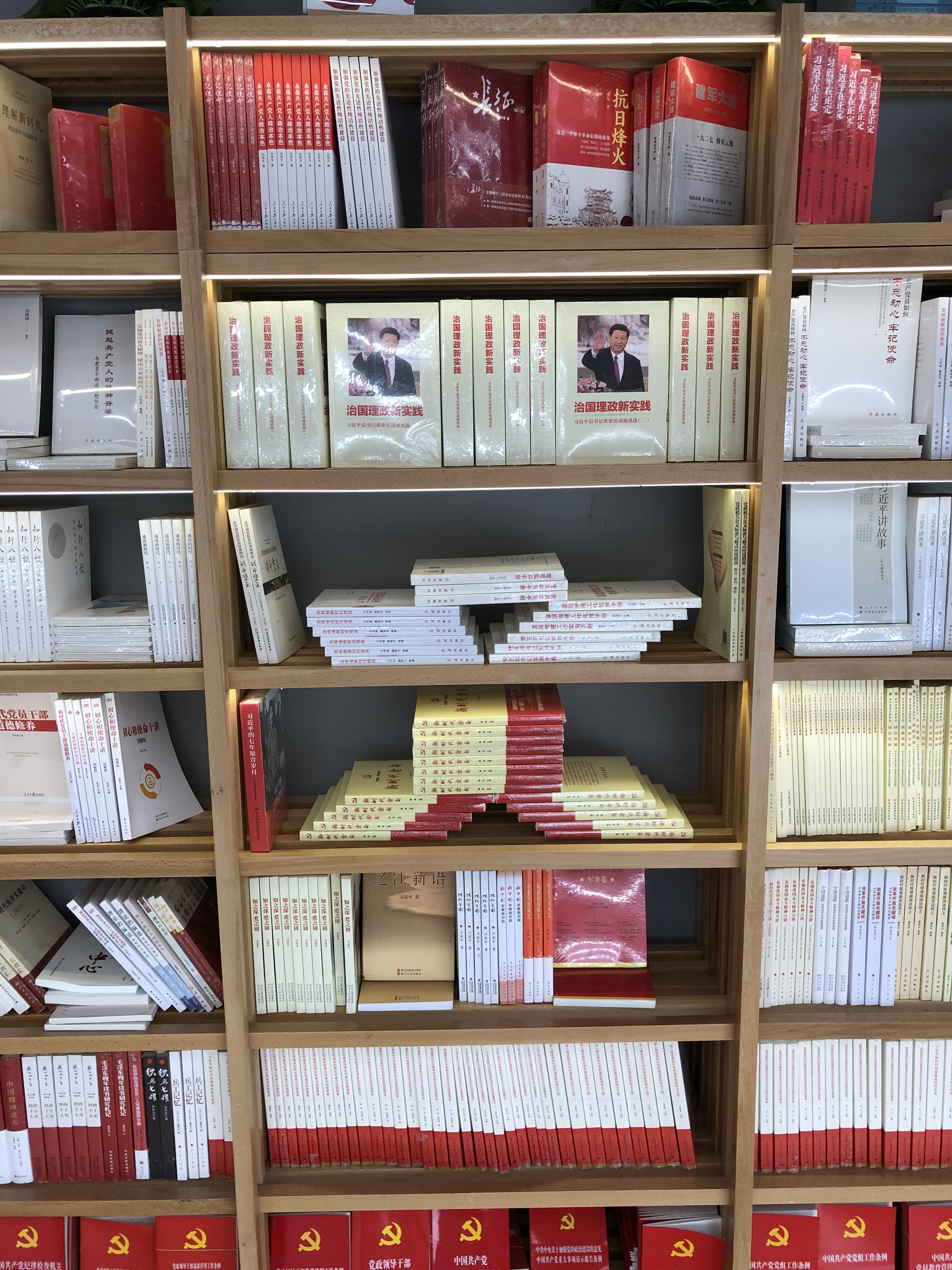
Books on Xi Jinping Thought displayed at the Xinhua Bookstore Wujiagang Bookstore in Yichang, Hubei

Finding cultural expressions for Xi Jinping Thought has been a priority. On 27 November 2017, more than 100 of China's top filmmakers, actors and pop stars were gathered for a day in Hangzhou to study the report of the 19th Party Congress featuring Xi Jinping Thought. Content from Xi's 2017 speech is used in public messages, described as being 'pervasive' by a Beijing correspondent for The New York Times. A poster featuring the slogan Chinese Dream comes from the speech, where the phrase is used 31 times. In July 2018, the carriages of a train in Changchun Rail Transit were decked out in red and dozens of Xi's quotes to celebrate the 97th anniversary of Chinese Communist Party. The train was described as a "highly condensed spiritual manual" of Xi Jinping Thought by the local government. In January 2019, Alibaba Group released an app called Xuexi Qiangguo for studying Xi Jinping Thought.

In May 2024, the China Cyberspace Research Institute, which is under the Cyberspace Administration of China, announced a large language model whose training data includes Xi Jinping Thought. In June 2026, Xinhuanet announced plans to invest over CN¥1.1 billion into an AI agent named "Xinhua Yudian", which is "an intelligent agent for learning, researching, and disseminating Xi Jinping Thought on Socialism with Chinese Characteristics for a New Era".

=== In education ===
On 25 October 2017, Renmin University established a Xi Jinping Thought research center, the first of its kind. By December 2017, 10 such research centers or institutes were approved and, by March 2018, all were in operation. Several dozen were opened by the end of 2018, and degree programs and online modules on Xi Jinping Thought were developed. On 20 July 2020, the China Institute of International Studies opened the Xi Jinping Thought on Diplomacy Studies Center.

Academics such as Jiang Shigong went on to write expositions of Xi Jinping Thought. In December 2019, Fudan University added content concerning the inculcation of teachers and students in Xi Jinping Thought into its charter, leading to protests about academic freedom among the students. In mid-2021, the Ministry of Education announced that Xi Jinping Thought would be taught to Chinese students beginning at the primary school level as part of ideological and political education, and announced the Outline for the Study of Xi Jinping Thought on Socialism with Chinese Characteristics for a New Era textbook. In August 2023, the Introduction to Xi Jinping Thought on Socialism with Chinese Characteristics for a New Era was added as a textbook for ideological and political education in colleges and universities.

In June 2023, the Institute of China and Contemporary Asia (ICCA) at the Russian Academy of Sciences opened the Modern Ideology of China Research Laboratory, the first research center dedicated to Xi Jinping Thought outside China. The ICCA director Kirill Babaev said that the institute aimed to conduct an "in-depth analysis of the ideas and concepts that make up the foundation of the modern Chinese state" and said that the institute would focus on "five areas of modern Chinese ideology – economic policy, internal policy and lawmaking, foreign policy and international relations, defence and security, and ecology and society".
