= Hengyang Daily =

Chinese Communist Party newspaper

- Type: Daily newspaper
- Publisher: Hengyang Daily Agency
- Founded: October 16, 1949
- Political alignment: Communism; Socialism with Chinese characteristics
- Language: Chinese
- Headquarters: Hengyang, Hunan
- OCLC number: 123257207
- Website: hyqss.cn

Hengyang Daily (Chinese: 衡阳日报), also known as Hengyang Ribao, is a simplified Chinese newspaper published in the People's Republic of China. It is the organ newspaper of the Hengyang Municipal Committee of the Chinese Communist Party (CCP). The newspaper is sponsored by the Hengyang Municipal Party Committee of CCP, first published on October 16, 1949, and its predecessor was Hengyang News (衡阳新闻).

== History ==
On 8 October 1949, the Chinese Communist Party took over Hengyang, and on 12 October, the Hengyang Military Control Commission (衡阳市军事管制委员会) was established, which took over China Times (中华时报), a newspaper run by the Central Club of the Kuomintang, and Dasheng Daily (大声日报), an organ of the Hengyang Kuomintang Headquarters, and on 16 October, on their basis, the commission launched Hengyang News as the organ of the Hengyang Military Control Commission.

In February 1959, Hengyang News was renamed as Hengyang Daily. In 1963, it became the organ newspaper of the Hengyang Municipal Committee of the CCP.
