= Copying the Party Constitution =

2016 Chinese Communist Party campaign

- Simplified Chinese: 抄党章
Transcriptions
Standard Mandarin
- Hanyu Pinyin: Chāo Dǎngzhāng

Alternative Chinese name
- Simplified Chinese: 手抄党章100天
Transcriptions
Standard Mandarin
- Hanyu Pinyin: Shǒuchāo Dǎngzhāng 100 Tiān

Copying the Party Constitution, also called hand-copying the Party Constitution for 100 days, was an activity initiated by "Study Group", the official overseas WeChat account of People's Daily, encouraging each member of the Chinese Communist Party (CCP) to make a handwritten copy of its constitution. It was part of the "Two Studies and One Action" campaign launched by the CCP. Initiated on 29 February 2016, the activity stopped on 22 May, its 83rd day.

== History ==
At 11:00 pm on February 29, 2016, "Study Group" (Chinese: 学习小组), the official overseas WeChat account of the People's Daily launched the "Hand-Copy the Party Constitution for 100 Days" campaign. The campaign encouraged each party member to make a handwritten copy of the constitution of the Chinese Communist Party in 100 days. "Study Group" stated that "Learning the Party Constitution" was the most important of the Two Studies and One Action campaign and stated that "the key to ‘hand-copying the Party Constitution’ is persistence. You need to persist every day. The content to be copied is the entire text of the Party Constitution, which is more than 15,000 words in total. You can finish copying it by writing 150 words every day." During the campaign, the official account would publish the content of the copying and photos of netizens copying the Party Constitution in various forms every day. Afterwards, many units across the country began to organize party members to study the Party Constitution and organized "hand-copying the Party Constitution" activities. State media outlets such as People's Daily Online and Xinhua News Agency also published a collection of photos of "copying the Party Constitution".

== Reactions ==
According to observations by Initium Media, before the 50th day of the event (April 19), the "Study Group" presentations were mainly photos of hand-copied Party Constitutions. After the 50th day, the presentations were mainly "special presentations" by local grassroots units, and some controversial statements were made. On May 16, the Nanchang Railway Bureau released photos of a couple copying the Party Constitution on their wedding night on Weibo, describing the photos as "spreading out the paper and neatly copying the Party Constitution, leaving a beautiful memory for the wedding night." These photos sparked discussion and ridicule among netizens on Chinese social media, causing the term "copying the Party Constitution" to spread widely on the Internet. There were questions about the authenticity of the pictures, while The Beijing News wrote on Weibo that copying the CCP constitution under such circumstances was "contrary to common sense". Subsequently, the initial news and reports of "copying the Party Constitution on the wedding night" were largely deleted on the Internet. On the 83rd day of the activity, that is, May 22, the "Study Group" stopped updating the "Hand-Copy the Party Constitution" activity, and the "Copy the Party Constitution" activity came to an abrupt end. After that, the "Study Group" never released any content related to "Copying the Party Constitution" again.
