= Taiyuan Daily =

Chinese Newspaper

- Native name: 太原日报
- Type: Daily newspaper
- Format: Broadsheet
- Publisher: Taiyuan Daily Agency
- Founded: 1913; 113 years ago
- Political alignment: Communism; Socialism with Chinese characteristics
- Language: Chinese
- Headquarters: Taiyuan, Shanxi
- OCLC number: 47597731
- Website: tynews.com.cn

Taiyuan Daily (Chinese: 太原日报), also known as Taiyuan Ribao, is a simplified Chinese newspaper published in the People's Republic of China. The newspaper is the organ newspaper of the Taiyuan Municipal Committee of the Chinese Communist Party, and its predecessor was Shanxi Political Newspaper (山西政报), inaugurated in Taiyuan in 1913, sponsored by the then Shanxi Gazette Office (山西公报馆).

In 1949, with the founding of the People's Republic of China, Taiyuan Daily is sponsored by the Taiyuan Municipal Committee of the CCP, and was re-launched on January 1, 1952.
