= Xi Jinping Thought on Strengthening the Military =

Xi Jinping Thought on Strengthening the Military (Chinese: 习近平强军思想) is the current military doctrine of the People's Republic of China regarding the People's Liberation Army. It is a part of the larger Xi Jinping Thought, which is derived from the General Secretary of the Chinese Communist Party Xi Jinping. It was established during the 19th National Congress of the Chinese Communist Party, held in October 2017.

== History ==
Xi Jinping Thought on Strengthening the Military was first established during the 19th National Congress of the Chinese Communist Party, held in October 2017, which also established its reading role in national defense and military construction. Xi Jinping's report to the National Congress established the goal of strengthening the military in the new era as "building a people's army that obeys the Party's command, that can win battles, and has a good style, and building the people's army into a world-class army". The Party Congress also incorporated Xi Jinping Thought on Strengthening the Military into the CCP Constitution.

The Research Center for Xi Jinping Thought on Strengthening the Military was launched in Beijing in May 2019. In January 2024, Chairman of the Central Military Commission Xi Jinping signed a revision of the regulations on military legislation in China, which took effect in March 2024. The new regulations "implement Xi Jinping Thought on Strengthening the Military". The Thought is among the content that is mandatory for soldiers of the People's Liberation Army to study.

== Content ==
In December 2017, Xi Jinping held a meeting of the Central Military Commission, where he summarized the Thought on Strengthening the Military in "ten clarifications". At the 20th National Congress of the Chinese Communist Party, Xi expanded the summary into "eleven clarifications". Xi also established the "five insistences" as the essence of the Thought.

The "eleven clarifications" say it is clear:

1. that the absolute leadership of the Party over the people's army is the foundation of the people's army and the soul of strengthening the army.
2. that a strong country must have a strong army.
3. that the Party's goal of strengthening the army in the new era is to build a people's army that obeys the Party's command, can win battles, and has a good style of work.
4. that the army must be prepared for war.
5. that in order to promote the cause of strengthening the military, we must adhere to the principles of building the military through politics, strengthening the military through reform, science and technology and talent, and governing the military according to law.
6. that reform is the only way to strengthen the military.
7. that science and technology are the core combat power.
8. that the way to strengthen the military is to get people.
9. that ruling the army by law is the basic way for our party to build and govern the army.
10. that military-civil fusion is a move to rejuvenate the country and strengthen the army.

The "five insistences" are insisting on:

1. Political guidance
2. Stopping war with force
3. Being proactive
4. Taking a comprehensive approach
5. Winning if we dare to fight
