= Shangqiu Daily =

- Native name: 商丘日报
- Type: Daily newspaper
- Founded: 1947
- Political alignment: Socialism with Chinese characteristics
- Language: simplified Chinese
- Headquarters: Shangqiu, Henan
- OCLC number: 123259666
- Website: sqrb.com.cn

Shangqiu Daily (Chinese: 商丘日报), also known as Shangqiu Ribao, is a simplified Chinese newspaper published in the People's Republic of China, it is the organ newspaper of the Shangqiu Municipal Committee of the Chinese Communist Party (CCP). The newspaper is Shangqiu's official media, sponsored and supervised by the Shangqiu Municipal Committee of the CCP.

Shangqiu Daily was originally founded by the Kuomintang Shangqiu County Party Department (国民党商丘县党部) in 1947, and ceased publication in May 1948. After the founding of the People’s Republic of China, Shangqiu Post (商丘报) was inaugurated on January 1, 1985, which was renamed to its current name on January 1, 1993.
