= 17th National Congress of the Chinese Communist Party =

2007 Chinese Communist Party conference

17th National Congress of the Chinese Communist Party 中国共产党第十七次全国代表大会
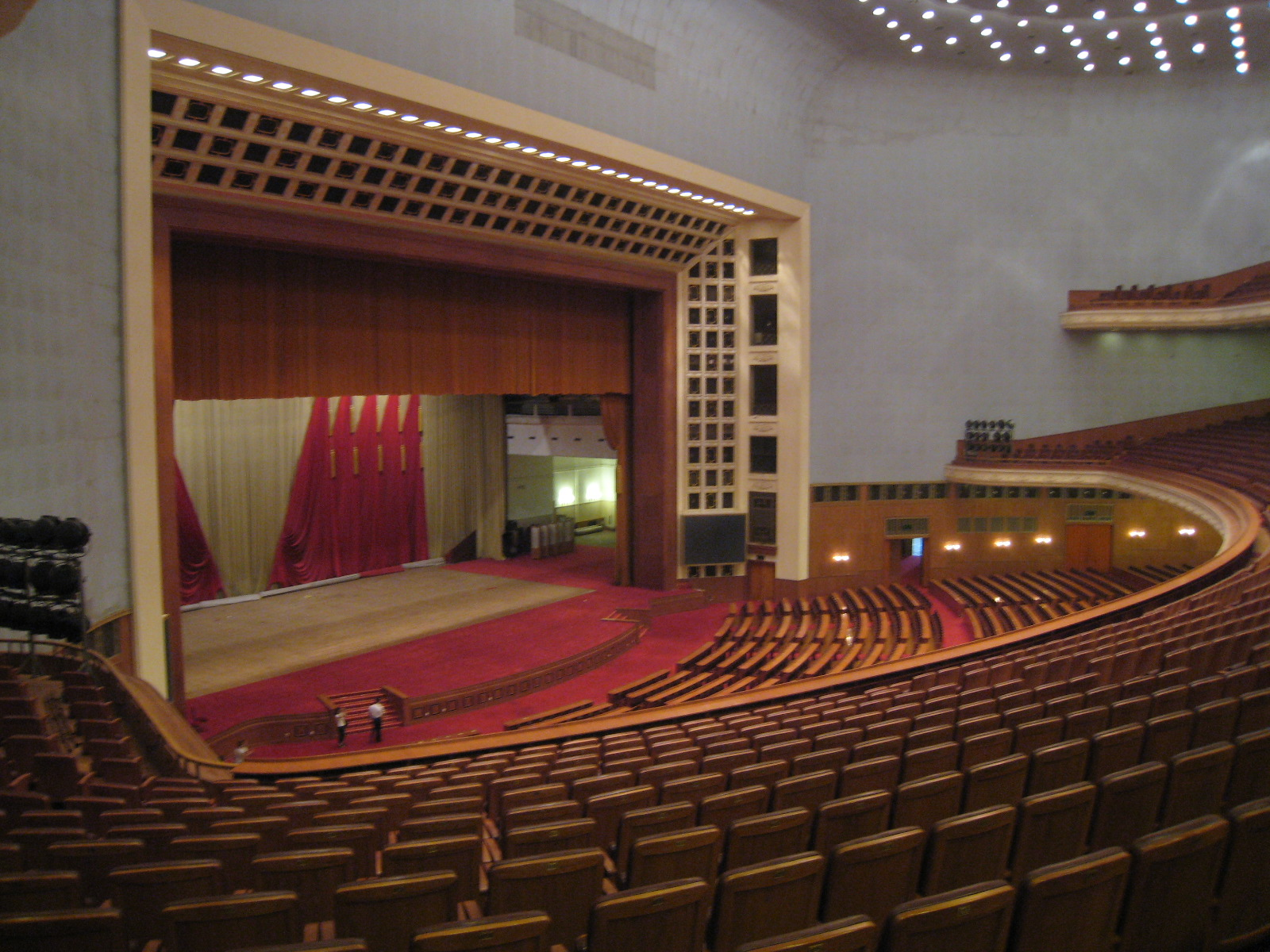
- Begins: October 15, 2007
- Ends: October 21, 2007
- Locations: Great Hall of the People, Beijing, China
- Previous event: 16th National Congress of the Chinese Communist Party (2002)
- Next event: 18th National Congress of the Chinese Communist Party (2012)
- Participants: 2,213 delegates
- Major events: Election of the 17th Central Committee and 17th Central Commission for Discipline Inspection
- Leader: Hu Jintao (Leader of the Chinese Communist Party)
- Website: www.china.org.cn/english/congress/225855.htm

17th National Congress of the Chinese Communist Party
- Simplified Chinese: 中国共产党第十七次全国代表大会
- Traditional Chinese: 中國共產黨第十七次全國代表大會
Transcriptions
Standard Mandarin
- Hanyu Pinyin: Zhōngguó Gòngchǎndǎng Dìshíqícì Quánguó Dàibiǎo Dàhuì

Abbreviation
- Chinese: 十七大
Transcriptions
Standard Mandarin
- Hanyu Pinyin: Shíqí Dà

The 17th National Congress of the Chinese Communist Party was held in Beijing, China, at the Great Hall of the People from 15 to 21 October 2007. During the Congress, CCP General Secretary Hu Jintao secured a second term as leader, and formally incorporated his key policies into the party constitution. It was succeeded by the 18th National Congress of the Chinese Communist Party.

The Congress also established the transition into the fifth generation of party leadership, appointing Xi Jinping and Li Keqiang to the Politburo Standing Committee (PSC), the country's de facto top decision-making body. Vice-President Zeng Qinghong, a prominent figure in former General Secretary Jiang Zemin's government, retired from the PSC. Anti-corruption chief Wu Guanzheng and legal and political commission chief Luo Gan also retired due to age, replaced by He Guoqiang and Zhou Yongkang in their respective posts.

== Significance ==
A Communist Party Congress is a significant event in Chinese politics since it nominally decides the leadership of the People's Republic of China. (The Politburo Standing Committee makes major policy decisions for the government to implement and the National People's Congress in the following March will elevate its members to top government positions.)

Although the Congress formally elects the Central Committee and Politburo, in practice these positions are negotiated before the congress, and the Congress has never functioned as a deliberative assembly. Nominees to Party positions are invariably elected by wide margins, with a tightly controlled candidate-to-position ratio. There is room for symbolic protest votes ("no" or "abstain" votes) that embarrass the party leadership. Despite its symbolic nature, it maintains an important role because it is the occasion at which the results of these deliberations are publicly announced, and in which the PRC leadership faces both domestic and foreign reporters in a press conference.

Since the mid-1980s, the Communist Party has attempted to maintain a smooth and orderly succession and avoid a cult of personality, by having a major shift in personnel every ten years in even-number party congresses, and by promoting people in preparation for this shift in odd-number party congresses. These mechanisms have been institutionalized by mandatory retirement ages, and provisions in both the Party and state constitutions that limit the term of office of officials to two five-year terms.

The 17th National Congress introduced the idea of a "low-carbon eco-city model" as part of a broader "eco-culture" framework, describing it as part of an effort to encourage sustained peace and common prosperity.

=== Effects on incumbent leadership ===
Based on established convention, Hu Jintao was confirmed for another term as the party's General Secretary, setting the scene for his re-election as state President at the National People's Congress in March 2008. Wen Jiabao, too, retained his seat on the PSC and continued to serve as Premier. In addition odd-number party congresses have also served as forums in which the top leadership has institutionalized their policy views as additions to party doctrine, in preparation for their retirement at the next party congress. Hu's version of this doctrine is termed the Scientific Development Concept to develop a "socialist harmonious society", which followed Marxism-Leninism, Mao Zedong Thought, Deng Xiaoping Theory and the Three Represents as a guiding ideology in the Party's constitution. It also included the theoretical system of socialism with Chinese characteristics to the Party constitution.

=== Succession planning ===
More interesting and unpredictable were the selection of the younger cadres who will be promoted to the Politburo, China's de facto ruling body. The youngest person currently on the Politburo prior to the congress was only two years younger than Hu, and consequently, there was widespread speculation that Hu's successor would not come from the members serving on the Politburo prior to the congress but rather from the next generation of leaders. Prior to the congress, speculation was rife on who would be named as Hu's successor. Although the subject of succession speculation is largely taboo within the mainland Chinese media, Hong Kong and Taiwan media, as well as international media, predicted that the top candidates would be Xi Jinping and Li Keqiang, then serving as party chief in Shanghai and Liaoning, respectively.

=== Effects on lower party officials ===
In addition, as people at the top level of the party retire, there is room for younger members of the party to move up one level. Hence the party congress is a time of a general personnel reshuffle, and the climax of negotiations that involve not only the top leadership but practically all significant political positions in Mainland China. Notably, fifth-generation leadership hopefuls Xi Jinping and Li Keqiang will leave vacancies in the top leadership position of Shanghai and Liaoning. In addition, Hubei, Guangdong, Chongqing and possibly Tianjin will all go through regional leadership changes. Because of the pyramid structure of the party and the existence of mandatory retirement ages, cadres who are not promoted at a party congress are likely to face the end of their political careers. Current provincial-level officials see the Congress as a chance for promotion to Beijing. The Congress will also be significant in determining the amount of influence still held by former General secretary Jiang Zemin, as reflected by the personnel changes.

Although Hong Kong has its separate political system, Congress is being watched closely by the Special Administrative Region as well. Hong Kong media has often been very vocal in speculation and in reporting events of the Congress. The political direction set by the decisions will have a large impact on the direction of Hong Kong's development in the coming years as well.

== Delegates ==
2,213 delegates were elected as delegates to the Congress through a series of staggered elections in which one level of the party elects delegates to the next higher party congress. An additional 57 veteran (mostly retired) communist leaders were appointed directly as delegates. This system has the effect that the party leadership through the Organization Department of the Chinese Communist Party can control elections and block the election of anyone it finds unacceptable.

The great majority of these are cadres, but about 30% are model workers, and there are about 20 private businesspeople. The number of candidates shortlisted by local Central Committees was 15% more than the number of delegates required, allowing local Party Congress members some degree of choice in the election. State media claimed this was "an improvement over past practices" (5% more in 1997 and 10% more in 2002), but noted heavy supervision of the election process by national Party authorities. In addition, elected delegates had to be approved by the 17th Delegate Status Inspection Committee, and the National Central Committee reserved the right to "select some veteran Party members who have quit their leading posts to attend the upcoming Party congress as specially-invited delegates".

Two prominent delegates are known to have died since the election finished in April 2007, Major-General Wang Shaojun, and former Vice-Premier Huang Ju.

== Elections and Work Reports ==
Many party positions will be elected, including the following:

- The Politburo (about two dozen members elected by the Central Committee; expected to change about half its membership), including its Standing Committee
- The wider Central Committee of the Chinese Communist Party (approximately 350 full and alternative members elected by the whole Congress; about 60% to change)
- The General Secretary
- Secretariat of the CCP Central Committee
- The Central Military Commission, include the Supreme Military Command
- The Discipline Inspection Commission

=== Central Committee election ===
The election process was supervised by Secretariat Secretary Zeng Qinghong, although he himself was not part of the new Central Committee. Most of those elected will take up the equivalent state positions after the National People's Congress in 2001, although key positions and existing vacancies on the State Council may change before and during the Congress. In the Central Committee elections on 21 October 2008, the margin of dropped off candidates was 8.3%, a three-point percentage increase from last year. The increased percentage seems to signify greater "inner Party democracy", and increased power among the delegates (i.e., only 204 out of 221 candidates shortlisted for the Central Committee survived the electoral process). In the new central committee, 107 of the 204 members are new members.

=== Hu Jintao's work report ===
General Secretary Hu Jintao's keynote report was prepared by Wen Jiabao. It was delivered to the first session of the Congress on 15 October 2007, and lasted well over two hours, and was broadcast on all major television and radio stations in the country. The event marked the first major live public address by Hu since taking over power in 2002. It laid heavy emphasis on Hu's Scientific Outlook on Development as the current guiding ideology in succession to Deng Xiaoping Theory and the Three Represents, with the goal of continuing socialism with Chinese characteristics and eventual socialist harmonious society. Hu also put forward the theoretical system of socialism with Chinese characteristics, which included Deng Xiaoping Theory, the Three Represents and the Scientific Outlook on Development.

Western media have generally concentrated on the lack of novelty with Hu's speech, citing that there was no references to political reform during the report. The Communist Party's grip on power is unlikely to waver for another period of time. Domestically, however, Hu's ideology is a novel addition to the current ideologies of the CCP, adding more of a populist focus, although the political rhetoric in the report was apparent. Hu stressed inner-party democracy, and repeated the word "democracy" 60 times in the speech according to Xinhua. In addition, Hu received applause a total of over 40 times, well over Jiang's record of 16 five years earlier.

During the speech, former General secretary Jiang Zemin seemed very tired, was constantly yawning, and was not paying much attention. Jiang seldom talked to Wen Jiabao, who was sitting to his left. Wen was paying full attention to Hu's speech for its entire length. Hong Kong media noted that Jiang left the Great Hall without shaking anyone's hand and that no one came up to shake his. Surprisingly, Mao's successor Hua Guofeng also attended the Congress as a delegate. All the surviving members of the 14th and 15th PSC's were present, including former Premiers Li Peng and Zhu Rongji, but with the exception of Jiang rival Qiao Shi.

There were work reports from key party leaders and institutions, providing the Party's analysis of the previous quinquennium and its agenda for the next five years. It is possible that the speech will also answer calls for inner-party democracy, i.e. decentralization within the one-party system.

Regarding Taiwan, Hu emphasized cultural, economic, and blood ties between the island and the People's Republic of China. In doing so, Hu used the slogan, "an entity of common destiny linked by blood." This slogan was later adapted by Xi Jinping into the broader concept of the common destiny for humankind.

=== Press conference ===
After the plenary sessions, there was a rare press conference by the Politburo Standing Committee. Newcomer Li Keqiang looked a bit stiff while Xi Jinping looked shy.

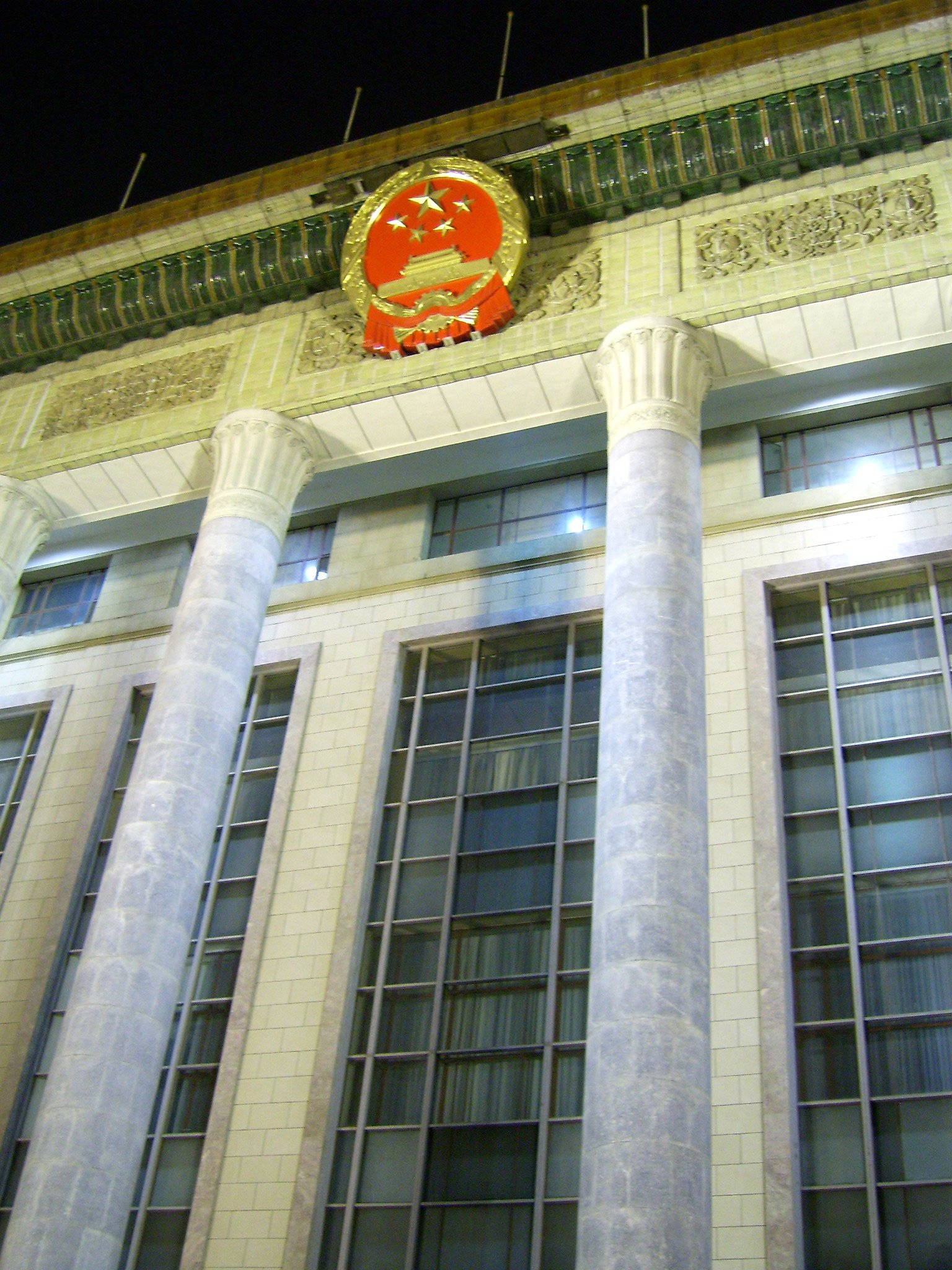
The plenary sessions of the Congress will meet in the Great Hall of the People

== Issues before the Congress ==
The Seventeenth National Congress made the negotiation of free trade agreements a priority, which accelerated the pace of China's bilateral free trade agreement negotiations.

=== Timeline of other events ===
- September 2006: Shanghai Party chief Chen Liangyu is arrested on corruption charges. This is perceived as an attack on the Shanghai Gang by the Hu-Wen alliance.
- 16 October: Xinhua carries an official commentary attacking "cliques" within the Party, perceived as a reference to the Shanghai clique.
- February 2007: Party elder Li Rui and retired academic Xie Tao published articles calling for the CCP to become a European-style socialist party; their remarks were condemned by the Party propaganda apparatus.
- 15 March: Prime Minister Wen Jiabao told foreign journalists he supported further political reform. The remarks were initially omitted from the official transcript, allegedly on the orders of hardline propaganda chief Li Changchun.
- 28 April: Academic Wan Gang becomes the first non-CCP minister in half a century, on being appointed Minister of Science and Technology
- 25 June: In a major speech at the Central Party School, General Secretary Hu announces the 'Four Steadfasts': an open-minded attitude, reform and opening up, and a moderately well-off (xiaokang) society by 2020. This repeated a goal previously set by Jiang at the 16th Party Congress.
- July: Chen Liangyu is formally convicted and expelled from the Party.
- Mid-August: Top CCP leaders discussed the Congress' decisions at their annual Beidaihe retreat. Some Hong Kong sources claim they decided the shortlists for the new Central Committee and Politburo, while others argued that basic PSC positions were still up for grabs.
- 19 August: Five national newspapers run identical front pages (shown here), all giving prominence to General secretary Hu.
- 28 August: A Politburo meeting decides dates of the 17th Party Congress, and the final meeting of the 16th Central Committee.
- 30 August: A reshuffle promoted Meng Xuenong, former mayor of Beijing and tuanpai politician, to Governor of Shanxi, whilst ousting Finance Minister Jin Renqing, who was allegedly placed in detention. Zhang Qingwei become the PRC's youngest ever minister, becoming Chairman of the Commission for Science, Technology, and Industry for National Defense after a career in the successful space programme. Ma Wen, deputy secretary of the Central Commission for Discipline Inspection (CCDI), added the Ministry of Supervision to her responsibilities.
- 6 September: Ma Wen gained a third role as head of a newly created National Bureau of Corruption Prevention. Unlike the CCDI, this does not investigate individual cases and is a government, rather than Party, organ. This led to speculation that the Congress will highlight the Hu-Wen leadership's anti-corruption drive.
- Mid-September: The Ministry of Public Security conducted the largest crackdown on Web sites and data hosts in history a month before the event.
- 18 September: State media announced that the Politburo had submitted an amendment to the CCP Constitution that would entrench Hu's "Scientific Development Concept" ideology alongside the theories of Marxism-Leninism, Mao Zedong Thought, Deng Xiaoping Theory and Jiang Zemin's Three Represents. The announcement stressed the role of General Secretary Hu and phrases associated with him.
- 19 September: Petitioners in Beijing's Fengtai District ordered to move from their homes due to construction work for the 17th Party Congress; the work was completed by 26 September.
- 19 September: In a move predicted by the Hong Kong press, Ling Jihua, a tuanpai member and Hu ally, replaced Wang Gang as director of the Central Committee's General Office.
- 21 September: A People's Daily commentary heralded "new good tidings from Shanghai", adding to speculation that Shanghai chief Xi Jinping was headed for promotion, as the Shanghai Party emerged from the Chen Liangyu scandal.
- 27 September: U.S.-based Duowei reported that Wu Bangguo had undergone cancer surgery. The same day, he made his first public appearance since 31 August.
- 29 September: Wu Bangguo was noticeably not present at the Politburo meeting as broadcast by Xinwen Lianbo, while all other Politburo Standing Committee members were given camera time. Also unconventional was the fact that no Politburo Standing Committee members were named except for Hu Jintao.
- 1 October: Hu Jintao visits Shanghai during National Day, a day after all eight PSC members attended a National Day banquet in Beijing. The move is seen as an affirmation of Shanghai and symbolizes the unity between Shanghai and the central leadership. Hu is also to open the Special Olympics there.
- 4 October: Duowei makes their final predictions on the nine members of the new politburo. Namely, in order ranking, they are Hu Jintao, Wu Bangguo, Wen Jiabao, Jia Qinglin, Li Changchun, Xi Jinping, Li Keqiang, He Guoqiang and Zhou Yongkang.
- 9 October: The 7th Plenum of the 16th Central Committee meets to finalize the agenda for the Congress. A key decision involving the entrenchment of Hu's Scientific Development Concept and Socialist Harmonious Society has taken place with discussions from delegates of the 16th Central Committee.
- 14 October: Taiwan-based China Times announces their final speculative shortlist for the PSC. The list is identical to Duowei's shortlist 10 days earlier.

== The leadership lineup ==
Hong Kong, Taiwan, and overseas media often speculate on the makeup of the leadership months before Congress takes place. During the 16th Party Congress, the speculation two months prior to the Congress on the nine members of the Politburo Standing Committee (PSC) were entirely accurate.

=== Leaving the Politburo ===
- Zeng Qinghong, CCP Secretariat Secretary, Vice-President, ranked 5th in Politburo Standing Committee, is out of the 17th Central Committee, likely due to age. Zeng's departure also signals the solidification of Hu Jintao's power.
- Wu Guanzheng, anti-corruption chief, ranked 7th in PSC, due to age.
- Luo Gan, Political and Legislative Affairs Committee Secretary, ranked 9th in the PSC, due to age.
- Wu Yi, Vice-Premier, China's "iron-lady", the only woman in the 16th Politburo, due to age.
- Zeng Peiyan, Vice-Premier, ranked 3rd, due to age.
- Cao Gangchuan, Minister of Defence, due to age.

=== Politburo Standing Committee ===
The newly formed Politburo Standing Committee consisted of (in order ranking) Hu Jintao, Wu Bangguo, Wen Jiabao, Jia Qinglin, Li Changchun, from the 16th Central Committee, in addition to four newcomers:

- Shanghai party chief Xi Jinping, 54
- Liaoning party chief Li Keqiang, 52
- CCP Organization Department head He Guoqiang, 64
- Minister of Public Security Zhou Yongkang, 65

=== The Politburo ===
The Politburo is made of a wider range of cadres whose average age is generally younger than that of the PSC, some of whom slated for promotion at the 18th Party Congress. It has been noted that the Politburo is a power balance between Hu's tuanpai, Jiang's Shanghai clique, and the Crown Prince Party.

In stroke order of surnames

- Xi Jinping, Top-ranked Secretary of CCP Secretariat, Vice-President, Vice-Chairman of the Central Military Commission, President of the Central Party School
- Wang Gang, Vice-Chair of CPPCC National Committee
- Wang Lequan, Party chief of Xinjiang, later Deputy Secretary of the Political and Legislative Affairs Committee
- Wang Zhaoguo, Vice-Chairman of National People's Congress, Chair of the All-China Federation of Trade Unions
- Wang Qishan, Vice-Premier
- Hui Liangyu, Vice-Premier
- Liu Qi, Party chief of Beijing, head of Beijing Olympics organizing committee
- Liu Yunshan, Secretary of CCP Central Secretariat, Head of the CCP Publicity Department
- Liu Yandong, State Councilor
- Li Changchun, Chairman of the Central Guidance Commission for Building Spiritual Civilization
- Li Keqiang, First Vice-Premier
- Li Yuanchao, Secretary in CCP Central Secretariat, CCP Organization Department head
- Wu Bangguo, Chairman of the Standing Committee of the National People's Congress
- Wang Yang, Party chief of Guangdong
- Zhang Gaoli, Party chief of Tianjin
- Zhang Dejiang, Vice-Premier, Party chief of Chongqing
- Zhou Yongkang, Secretary of the Political and Legislative Affairs Committee
- Hu Jintao, CCP General Secretary, PRC President, Chairman of the Central Military Commission
- Yu Zhengsheng, Party chief of Shanghai
- He Guoqiang, Secretary of the Central Commission for Discipline Inspection
- Jia Qinglin, Chairman of the National Committee of the Chinese People's Political Consultative Conference
- Xu Caihou, Vice-Chairman of Central Military Commission
- Guo Boxiong, Vice-Chairman of Central Military Commission
- Wen Jiabao, Premier of the State Council
- Bo Xilai, Party chief of Chongqing, Dismissed April 2012

=== Other Politburo places ===
- Central Committee bureaucrat Wang Gang is expected to become a figurehead on the NPC or CPPCC (and implicitly a Politburo member), although he has an outside chance of a PSC place.
- Wang Zhaoguo is Wu Bangguo's deputy at the NPC and Hu's former boss in the CYL. He has recently been considered to have an outside chance of a PSC place, given his age.

=== Regional Positions ===
- Minister of Commerce Bo Xilai, after some reluctance following the Congress, took over as Chongqing Party Chief.
- Hubei Party chief Yu Zhengsheng took over Shanghai as the municipality's Communist Party secretary.
- Chongqing Party chief Wang Yang took over as Guangdong Party chief.
- Beijing Mayor Wang Qishan left his municipal post to become Vice-Premier.

=== Central Military Commission positions ===
- Chen Bingde may have already replaced Liang Guanglie as the PLA's Chief of General Staff.

=== Ministerial positions ===
- Early speculation suggested a wide field for Vice-Premier responsible for the economy, namely National Development and Reform Commission (NDRC) chief Ma Kai, SASAC chief Kelin Ding, PBoC chief Zhou Xiaochuan, MOFCOM chief Bo Xilai, State Council official Lou Jiwei, Beijing Mayor Wang Qishan, Tianjin Mayor Dai Xianglong, Shanghai Mayor Han Zheng and Chongqing Party chief Wang Yang.
- Former Shanxi Governor Yu Youjun is tipped for Minister of Culture.
- State council positions will be confirmed at the 2008 National People's Congress.

== See also ==
- 16th National Congress of the Chinese Communist Party
- 18th National Congress of the Chinese Communist Party
- History of China (2002–2012)
- Li Lianyu, a local official who mobilized a mass welcoming ceremony for himself upon his return from the 17th Party Congress
