= Two Studies and One Action =

Chinese Communist Party internal campaign

- Simplified Chinese: "两学一做"学习教育
Transcriptions
Standard Mandarin
- Hanyu Pinyin: "Liǎng xué yī zuò" xuéxí jiàoyù

The Two Studies and One Action was an education campaign launched by the Chinese Communist Party (CCP) launched in 2016. It asked all CCP members "to study the Party Constitution and rules, and speeches of Xi Jinping, and to become qualified Party members".

== History ==
On 28 February 2016, the General Office of the CCP Central Committee issued the "Program for the Study of the Party Constitution and Party Regulations, Study of the Series of Speeches, and Becoming Qualified Party Members" and issued a notice requiring all regions and departments to implement it. The "Study of the Party Constitution and Party Regulations, Study of the Series of Speeches, and Becoming Qualified Party Members" was officially referred to as "Two Studies and One Action". On 6 April, Xi Jinping described the campaigns purpose was to "strengthen the Marxist stance" of CCP members and keep them in line with "ideology, politics and action".

On 29 February 2016, "Study Group" the official overseas WeChat account of the People’s Daily launched a 100-day Copying the Party Constitution campaign, encouraging members of the Chinese Communist Party (CCP) to copy and write the Party Constitution. On the 83rd day, "Study Group" stopped updating the activity, bring it to an abrupt end.

== Purpose ==
The campaign asked all CCP members to study the party constitution and rules, and speeches of Xi Jinping, and to become "qualified Party members". Officially. the purpose of the campaign was to:

- thoroughly study and implement the spirit of the speech by CCP General Secretary Xi Jinping;
- promote comprehensive and strict Party governance to extend to the grassroots level;
- consolidate and expand the results of the CCP's mass line education and practice activities and the "Three Stricts and Three Realities" special education;
- further solve the problems existing in the party members' ranks in terms of ideology, organization, style, and discipline;
- maintain and develop the party's advanced nature and purity.

== See also ==
- List of campaigns of the Chinese Communist Party
- Patriotic education in China
- Cadre system of the Chinese Communist Party
