= System of community-level self-governance =

Administrative division of the People's Republic of China

The system of community-level self-governance (Chinese: 基层群众自治制度; pinyin: Jīcéng Qúnzhòng Zìzhì Zhìdù) is a term used by the Chinese Communist Party (CCP) to describe a form of local government in the People's Republic of China (PRC).

== History ==
The system of community-level self-governance was established at the 17th National Congress of the Chinese Communist Party in 2007 as a system local government in the People's Republic of China. The Party Congress regarded upholding and improving the system of community-level self-governance as an important part of adhering to the "path of socialism with Chinese characteristics."

== System ==
The system officially relies on community-level mass self-government organizations (such as villagers' committees and residents' committees) to enable residents in urban and rural areas to directly exercise relevant political rights and to self-manage, self-serve, self-educate, and self-supervise.

== See also ==
- System of people's congress
