= 18th National Congress of the Chinese Communist Party =

2012 Chinese Communist Party conference

18th National Congress of the Chinese Communist Party 中国共产党第十八次全国代表大会
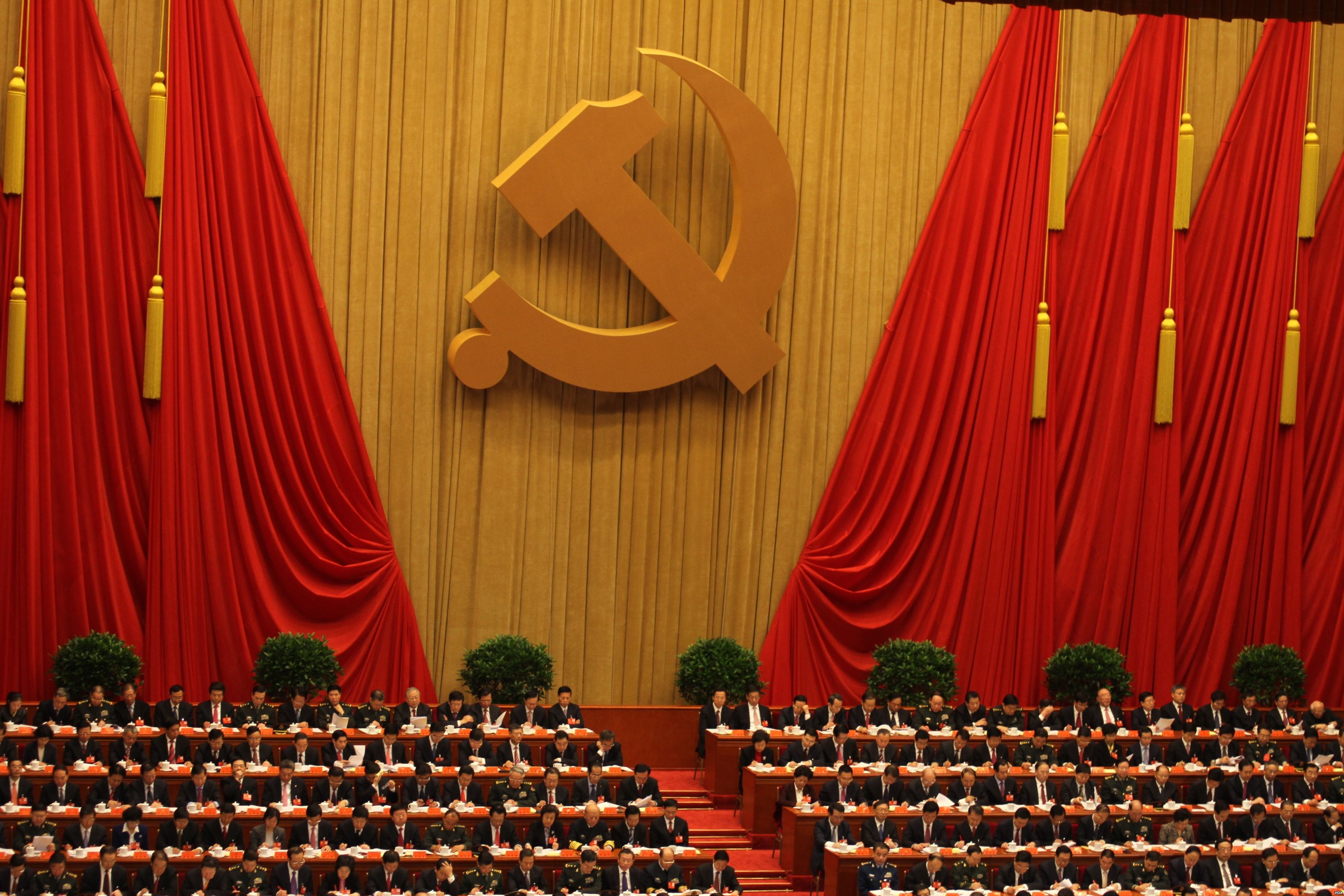
- Begins: November 8, 2012
- Ends: November 14, 2012
- Locations: Great Hall of the People, Beijing, China
- Previous event: 17th National Congress of the Chinese Communist Party (2007)
- Next event: 19th National Congress of the Chinese Communist Party (2017)
- Participants: 2,268 delegates
- Major events: Election of the 18th Central Committee and 18th Central Commission for Discipline Inspection
- Leader: Hu Jintao (Leader of the Chinese Communist Party)
- Website: www.xinhuanet.com/english/special/18cpcnc/topnews.htm

18th National Congress of the Chinese Communist Party
- Simplified Chinese: 中国共产党第十八次全国代表大会
- Traditional Chinese: 中國共產黨第十八次全國代表大會
Transcriptions
Standard Mandarin
- Hanyu Pinyin: Zhōngguó Gòngchǎndǎng Dìshíbācì Quánguó Dàibiǎo Dàhuì

Abbreviation,
- Chinese: 十八大
Transcriptions
Standard Mandarin
- Hanyu Pinyin: Shíbā Dà

The 18th National Congress of the Chinese Communist Party was held in the Great Hall of the People, Beijing from 8 to 14 November 2012. The National Congress is the highest organ of the party, and is stipulated to be held every five years. The conference had 2,268 delegates.

The CCP Congress endorsed the amendments to the CCP constitution, membership list of the Central Commission for Discipline Inspection and elected the 18th Central Committee of the CCP. The day after the closing of the Congress, the first plenary session was held at which the Central Committee approved the composition of the Secretariat, and soon after, the members of the Politburo and its Standing Committee, the party's most powerful decision-making body. Xi Jinping succeeded Hu Jintao as CCP general secretary after the Congress. It was followed by the 19th National Congress of the CCP in 2017.

Due to term limits and age restrictions, seven of the nine members of the Politburo Standing Committee retired after the Congress, and the number of Politburo Standing Committee seats reduced was from nine to seven. The seven PSC members elected after the Congress were Xi Jinping, Li Keqiang, Zhang Dejiang, Yu Zhengsheng, Liu Yunshan, Wang Qishan and Zhang Gaoli. Five of these were identified as associates or having benefited from the patronage of former CCP general secretary Jiang Zemin, who reportedly exerted considerable influence in shaping the composition of the new Standing Committee. Only Li Keqiang and Liu Yunshan were considered to be members of the tuanpai.

== Delegates ==
Some 2,270 delegates selected from 40 constituencies attended the Congress. This represented an increase of 57 delegates and two constituencies from the 17th Congress. 31 of these constituencies represent China's province-level jurisdictions. Six other delegations represented Taiwan, the People's Liberation Army, Central Party organizations, Central Government Ministries and Commissions, State Owned Enterprises, and Central Banks and Financial Institutions. The remaining three delegations are the subject of conflicting accounts. Hong Kong and Macau may represent two delegations or one delegation or they may be treated as part of the Guangdong delegation. Other delegations that have been identified by various sources include the Peoples Armed Police, units involved in "social management", the public service sector, workers in private enterprises, and workers in foreign and joint enterprises. No more than 68% of the delegates may hold leadership positions within the party. The remaining 32% will be "grassroots" party members who hold jobs outside of the party apparatus. The number of females increased from the previous congress. Each delegation will be selected (by the province level congresses) in an election in which there are at least 15% more candidates than there are delegates to be selected. The candidates in these elections are heavily vetted by multiple party organs. In addition to these 2,270 delegates, an uncertain number of additional delegates, primarily retired veteran CCP leaders, will be selected. At the 17th National Congress there were 57 such delegates.

== The Congress ==
The 18th National Congress made ecological civilization one of the country's five national development goals. It emphasized a rural development approach of "Ecology, Productivity, Livability."

Hu repeated the goal of establishing a xiaokang society by 2020. This goal had been set by Jiang at the 16th National Congress and also previously asserted by Hu at the 17th National Congress. Hu instructed the PLA to update its space strategy. Hu also stated China should "implement the military strategy of active defense for the new period, and enhance military strategic guidance as the times so require. We should attach great importance to maritime, space, and cybersecurity."

The 18th National Congress introduced the "core socialist values" campaign. The campaign promotes four national goals (prosperity, democracy, civility, and harmony), four social goals (freedom, equality, justice, and the rule of law), and four individual values (patriotism, dedication, integrity, and friendship). Since the 18th National Congress, Xi Jinping has emphasized utilizing red resources, telling red stories, and inheriting red genes.

=== Party Constitution Amendments ===
The Congress ratified changes to the CCP constitution. The Scientific Outlook on Development of the Hu Jintao era was listed next to Marxism-Leninism, Mao Zedong Thought, Deng Xiaoping Theory, and Three Represents as a "guiding ideology" of the party, 'upgraded' from simply an ideology to merely "follow and implement" when it was initially written into the constitution in 2007. The Scientific Outlook on Development was said to be the "latest product Marxism being adopted in the Chinese context," and the result of the "collective wisdom of the party membership."

The affirmation of "socialism with Chinese Characteristics" as a "system" (zhidu) was written into the party constitution for the first time. The "construction of ecological civilization" (shengtai wenming) as a major goal of the party was also written into the party constitution, an extension from the previous version of the constitution which included economic, political, cultural, and social realms; this ostensibly increased the attention the party intended to focus on the environment.

== Leadership changes ==
The 18th Politburo Standing Committee
Name	Born	Portfolio (Note: This is a rough formulation of the main areas of focus for each member; some of these portfolios are institutionalized in the form of central leading groups, i.e. ad hoc policy coordination bodies led by each member, others are informal.)
Xi Jinping	1953	Overall policy framework, foreign affairs, Taiwan, national security, internet, military
Li Keqiang	1955	Government operations, policy implementation, economic reform, climate change
Zhang Dejiang	1946	Legislation, Hong Kong and Macau
Yu Zhengsheng	1945	Civic organizations, ethnic minority affairs, Tibet and Xinjiang
Liu Yunshan	1947	Party organization, ideological doctrine, propaganda
Wang Qishan	1948	Internal regulations, party discipline, anti-corruption
Zhang Gaoli	1946	Strategic initiatives, mega-projects

=== The Politburo Standing Committee ===
It was widely speculated that Xi Jinping and Li Keqiang would succeed Hu Jintao and Wen Jiabao as top Politburo Standing Committee members by November 2012, and take over the Presidency and Premiership in March 2013 at the National People's Congress. Since 2002, all Standing Committee members had retired if they were 68 or older at the time of a party congress. As a result of this largely unspoken convention, it was expected that all other members of the outgoing standing committee would have to retire at the 18th Congress. About 70% of the members of the Central Military Commission and the executive committee of the State Council would also turn over in 2012; in addition, every member of the 17th Central Committee born before 1945 relinquished their Central Committee membership at the Congress. The Congress marked the most significant leadership transition in decades.

Chinese politics prior to the 18th National Congress trended towards "collective leadership", where the paramount leader had to share power with his circle of senior leaders in the Politburo Standing Committee, particularly the Premier. Thus ultimately the paramount leader was not expected to have the same amount of power accorded to it during the era of Mao and Deng. The practice of governing through consensus within the Politburo Standing Committee became the norm following the 16th National Congress in 2002. During that Congress, the size of the Standing Committee was increased from seven members to nine, with Luo Gan and Li Changchun being added to handle the law enforcement and propaganda portfolios, respectively. However, these two factors led to inefficiencies in the decision-making process. In order to improve the efficacy of the Standing Committee, the 18th National Congress was expected to end in a return to a smaller, seven-member committee. The propaganda and public security portfolios were expected to be downgraded to the level of the Politburo.

Apart from the largely pre-ordained selection of Xi and Li for its top two positions, intense speculation mounted over who else might join the standing committee. Two unexpected events upset the carefully balanced political equilibrium in the lead up to the Congress. The Wang Lijun incident in early 2012 no longer made former Chongqing party chief Bo Xilai a viable candidate for the PSC, and "Ferrari crash" of the son of Ling Jihua, a top aide of Hu Jintao, was said to have reduced Hu's bargaining power in the leadership selection process. Initial speculation placed Yu Zhengsheng, Zhang Dejiang, Li Yuanchao, Wang Qishan, and Wang Yang on the new standing committee. However, Li Yuanchao and Wang Yang, largely seen as belonging to the 'liberal' wing of the party, were ultimately not selected. Instead, Liu Yunshan and Zhang Gaoli joined the standing committee. Liu, a former Publicity Department head, took over as both the head of the party's Central Secretariat and the top official in charge of propaganda, and was seen as the most strongly conservative member in the new PSC. Zhang, a bookish party bureaucrat known for presiding over economic growth in numerous regions, was ostensibly selected for his technocratic competence. Apart from Xi Jinping and Li Keqiang, all the other members of the new standing committee were born in the late 1940s and therefore would need to retire at the 19th National Congress if the informally mandated retirement rules still holds in 2017. Li Yuanchao (born 1950) and Wang Yang (born 1955) ostensibly could still join the 19th standing committee at that time.

The 18th Politburo Standing Committee was formed on 15 November 2012, the newly formed Politburo Standing Committee consisted of (in order ranking) Xi Jinping, Li Keqiang, from the 17th Central Committee, in addition to newcomers:

3. Zhang Dejiang (3rd-ranked Vice Premier and Party Chief of Chongqing)
4. Yu Zhengsheng (Party chief of Shanghai)
5. Liu Yunshan (Head of the CCP Publicity Department and elected as Top-ranked Secretary of the Central Secretariat of the CCP)
6. Wang Qishan (4th-ranked Vice Premier and elected as Secretary of the Central Commission for Discipline Inspection)
7. Zhang Gaoli (Party chief of Tianjin)

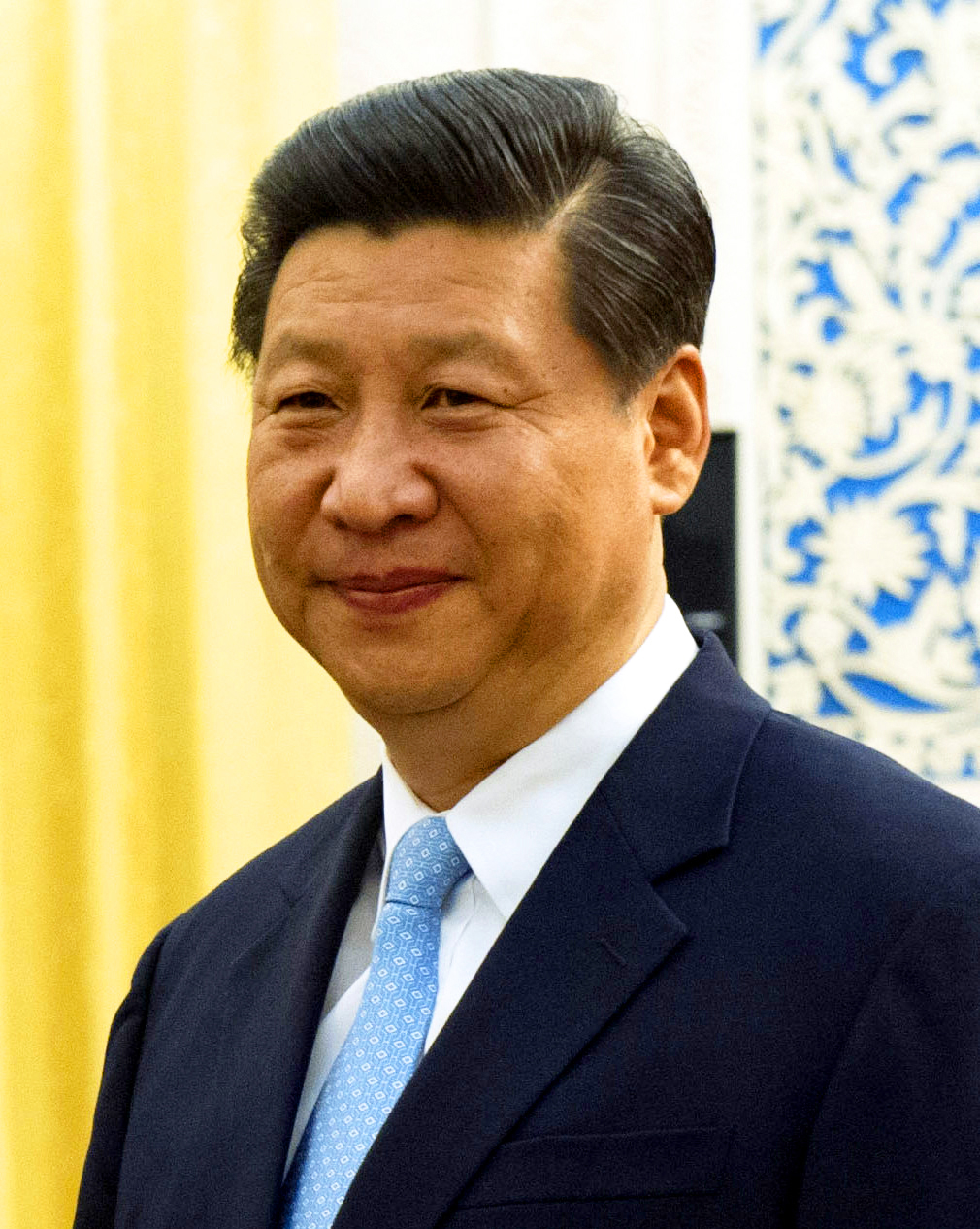
Xi Jinping

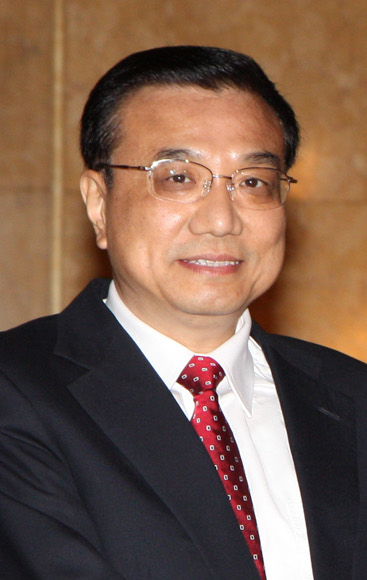
Li Keqiang

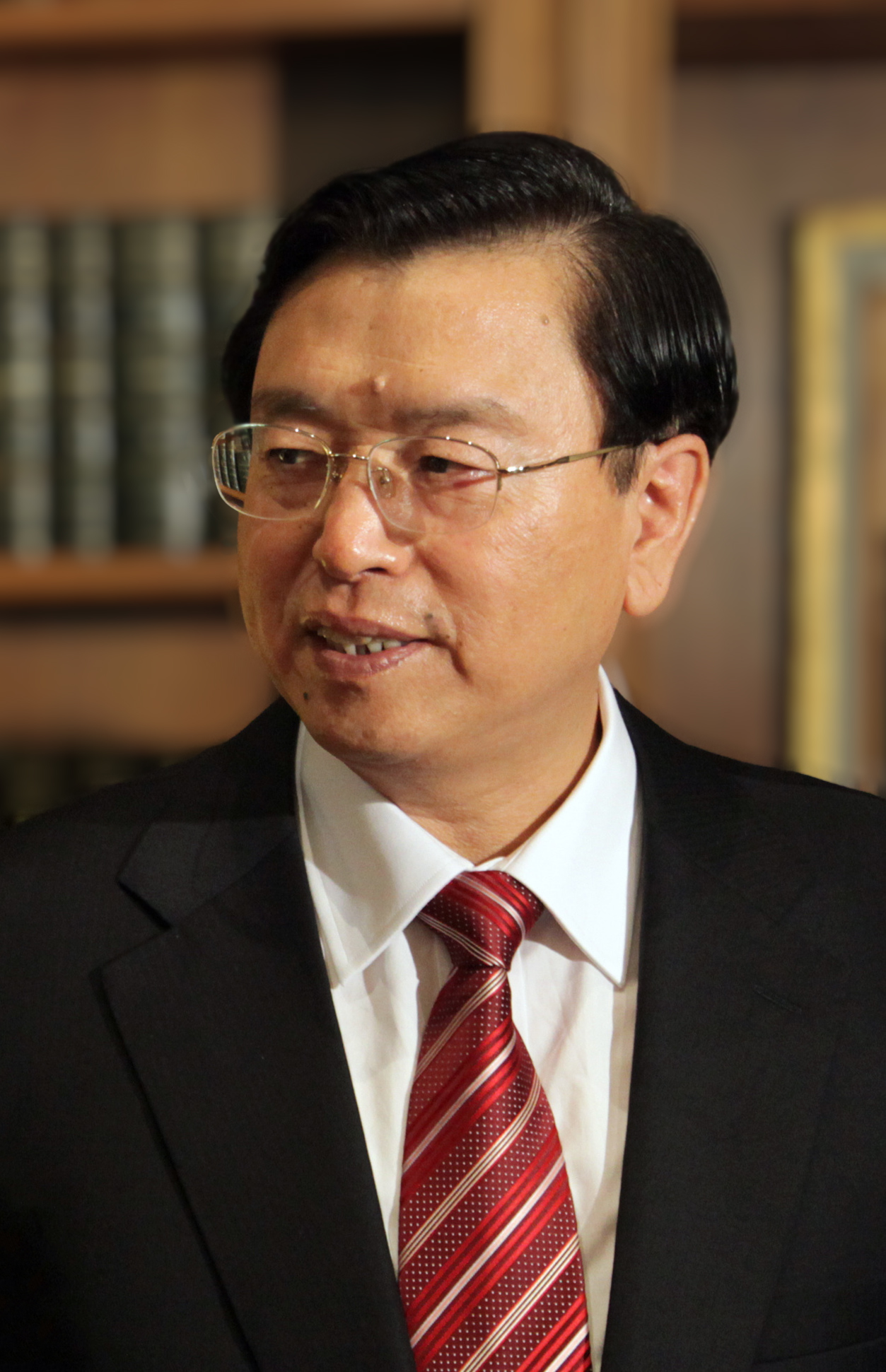
Zhang Dejiang

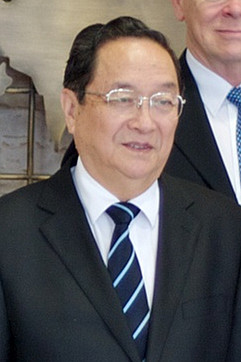
Yu Zhengsheng

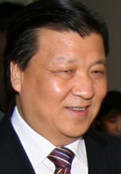
Liu Yunshan

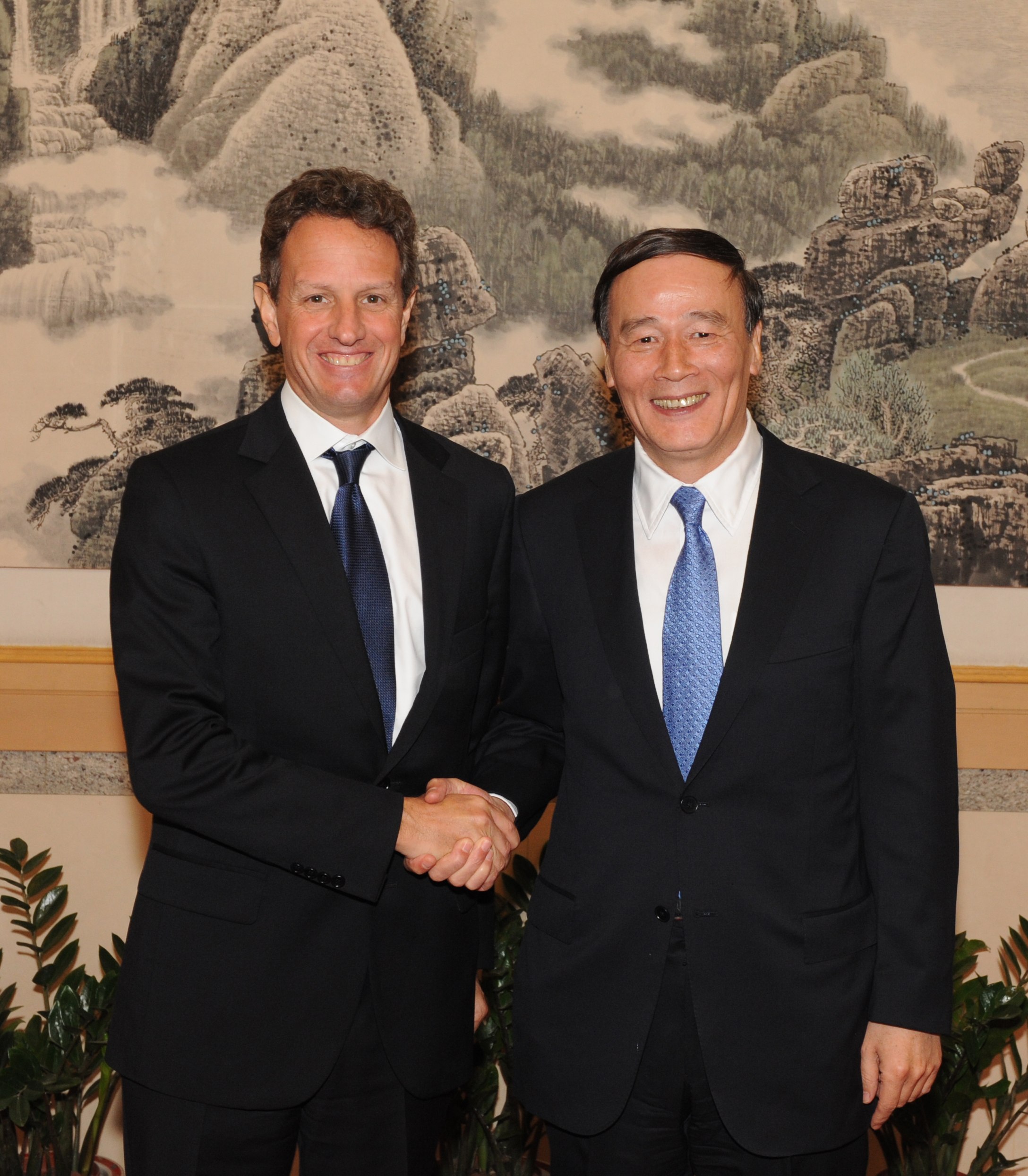
Wang Qishan

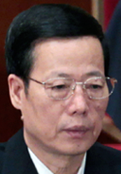
Zhang Gaoli

=== The Politburo ===
The 18th Politburo was also named at the Congress. Within the 17th Politburo, eleven members were born after 1945. Of these, seven were named to the Standing Committee (see above); and the remaining three, Liu Yandong, Li Yuanchao, and Wang Yang, retained their Politburo seats. Bo Xilai was suspended from the Politburo prior to the Congress. All 14 members of the 17th Politburo born prior to 1945 relinquished their Politburo membership due to having reached the mandatory retirement age of 68 at the time of the Congress. Conversely, this also meant that all members of the 17th Politburo born after 1945 (except Bo Xilai) maintained their Politburo membership.

Since the majority of members of the 17th Politburo retired at the Congress, some fifteen seats on the 18th Politburo were to be filled by newcomers. Notable additions to the Politburo included Wang Huning, who became the first head of the party's Central Policy Research Office to hold a seat on the Politburo; Li Zhanshu, former Guizhou party chief who took over as head of the party's General Office; Meng Jianzhu, former Minister of Public Security who took on the portfolio of the Central Legal and Political Affairs Commission; and Hu Chunhua and Sun Zhengcai, two officials born after 1960 who took on major regional party leadership posts in Guangdong and Chongqing, respectively, following the Congress.

By convention, the members are listed in stroke order of surnames.

- Ma Kai (born 1946), Vice Premier
- Wang Huning (born 1955), Director of the Policy Research Office of the CCP Central Committee
- Liu Yandong (born 1945), Vice Premier
- Liu Qibao (born 1953), Secretary of the CCP Central Secretariat, Head of the CCP Publicity Department
- Xu Qiliang (born 1950), Vice Chairman of the Central Military Commission
- Sun Chunlan (born 1950), party chief of Tianjin (until 2014); head of the CCP United Front Work Department
- Sun Zhengcai (born 1963), Party chief of Chongqing (until 2017; expelled)
- Li Jianguo (born 1946), Vice-chairman and Secretary-General of the National People's Congress
- Li Yuanchao (born 1950), Vice President of China
- Wang Yang (born 1955), Vice Premier
- Zhang Chunxian (born 1953), Party chief of Xinjiang (until 2016); deputy leader, Leading Group for Party Building
- Fan Changlong (born 1947), Vice Chairman of the Central Military Commission
- Meng Jianzhu (born 1947), Secretary of the Central Political and Legal Affairs Commission
- Zhao Leji (born 1957), Secretary of the CCP Central Secretariat, Head of the CCP Organization Department
- Hu Chunhua (born 1963), Party chief of Guangdong
- Li Zhanshu (born 1950), Secretary of CCP Central Secretariat, Chief of the General Office of the Chinese Communist Party
- Guo Jinlong (born 1947), Party chief of Beijing (until 2017); Vice Chairman, Central Guidance Commission on Building Spiritual Civilization
- Han Zheng (born 1955), Party chief of Shanghai

Leaving the Politburo

- Bo Xilai expelled from the politburo before the 18th National Congress due to the Wang Lijun incident and other violations.
- Wang Gang, Vice Chairman of CPPCC National Committee
- Wang Lequan, Deputy Secretary of the Central Political and Legal Affairs Commission
- Wang Zhaoguo, Vice Chairman of National People's Congress, Chair of the All-China Federation of Trade Unions
- Hui Liangyu, 2nd ranked Vice Premier
- Liu Qi, Party chief of Beijing, head of Beijing Olympics organizing committee
- Li Changchun, Chairman of the Central Guidance Commission on Building Spiritual Civilization
- Wu Bangguo, Chairman of the Standing Committee of the National People's Congress
- Zhou Yongkang, Secretary of the Central Political and Legal Affairs Commission
- Hu Jintao, CCP General Secretary, PRC President, Chairman of the Central Military Commission
- He Guoqiang, Secretary of the Central Commission for Discipline Inspection
- Jia Qinglin, Chairman of the National Committee of the Chinese People's Political Consultative Conference
- Xu Caihou, Vice Chairman of Central Military Commission
- Guo Boxiong, Vice Chairman of Central Military Commission
- Wen Jiabao, Premier of the State Council

=== The Secretariat ===
The Secretariat, mainly overseeing party affairs and acting as the day-to-day executive arm of the Central Committee, was led by PSC member Liu Yunshan, who also held the post of President of the Central Party School. Liu Qibao, Zhao Leji, and Li Zhanshu earned seats on the Secretariat, as was anticipated for the heads of the Propaganda, Organization, and General Office. Zhao Hongzhu succeeded He Yong's place on the secretariat as the top-ranked Deputy Secretary of the Central Commission for Discipline Inspection. Departing from the previous composition of the body, Du Qinglin, outgoing United Front Department chief, who held no other post at the time (he was later elected a ceremonial vice-chair of the CPPCC in March 2013), was elevated to the Secretariat. Similarly, Yang Jing, ethnic Mongol and former chairman of Inner Mongolia, who would go on to be named Secretary-General of the State Council, 'broke convention' and earned a seat on the Secretariat, signalling that the top government organ, the State Council, will work in closer coordination with the Party.

=== Ministerial positions ===
- State council positions were confirmed at the 12th National People's Congress in March 2013 during the 1st Plenary Session.

== See also ==
- Generations of Chinese leadership
- 17th National Congress of the Chinese Communist Party
- 19th National Congress of the Chinese Communist Party
