= Constitution of the Chinese Communist Party =

Party constitution

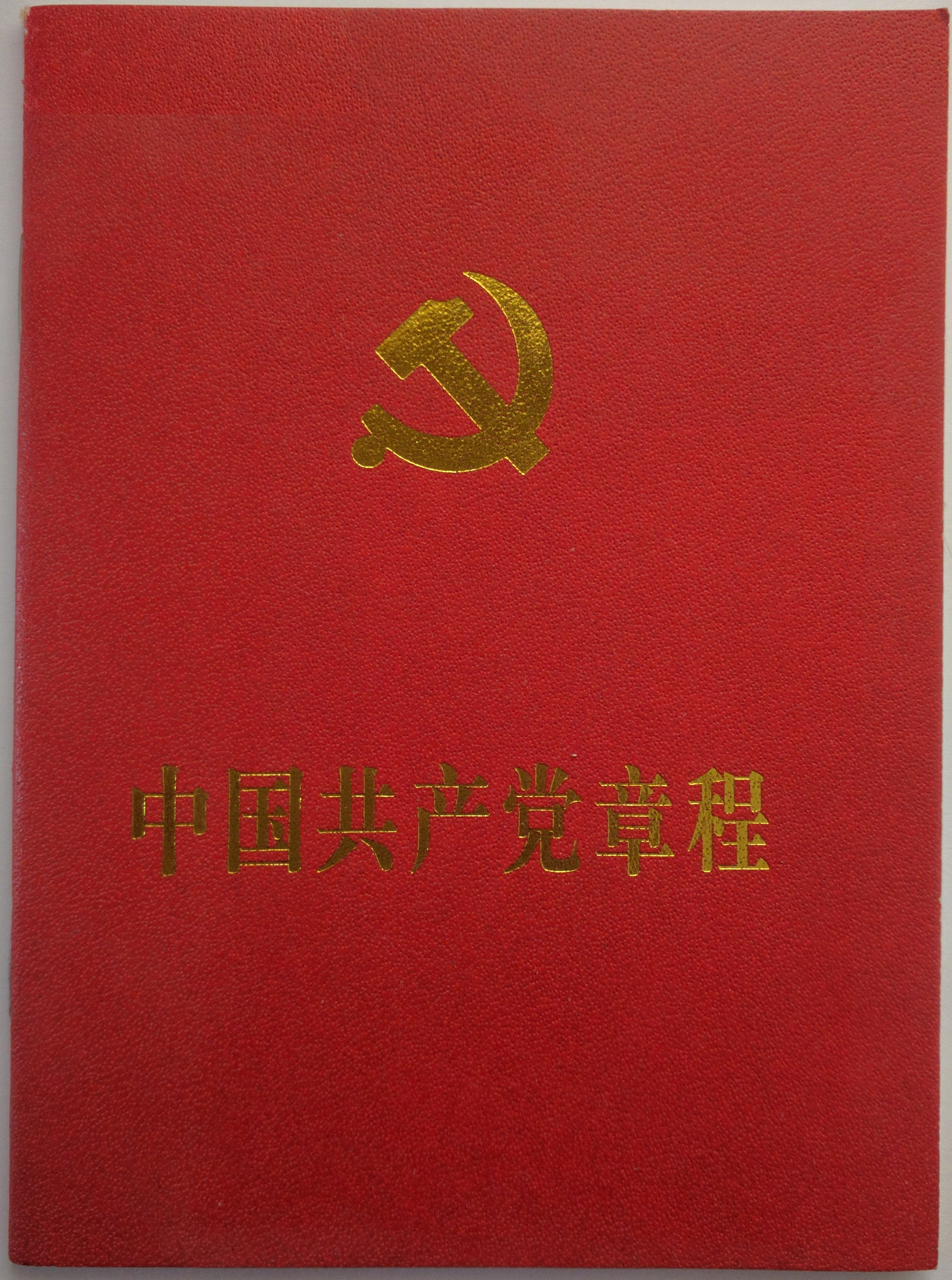
- Front cover of the Constitution of the Chinese Communist Party
- Simplified Chinese: 中国共产党章程
- Traditional Chinese: 中國共産黨章程
Transcriptions
Standard Mandarin
- Hanyu Pinyin: Zhōngguó Gòngchǎndǎng Zhāngchéng

The Constitution of the Chinese Communist Party is the fundamental governing document of the Chinese Communist Party (CCP). Consisting of 55 articles, its contents describe the program of the party, as well as its organizational structure and party symbolism.

The CCP adopted its first program at the 1st National Congress, which set out its ideology as Marxism–Leninism, and its ultimate goal as the realization of communism. The program amended in each subsequent CCP Congress. The 7th National Congress in 1945 adopted the CCP's first constitution. It included Mao Zedong Thought as the CCP's working compass, and was the first that it independently drafted. The constitution currently in force was adopted at the 12th National Congress in 1982. While it has since been revised, its basic content has been stable since 1982.

== History ==
The Chinese Communist Party (CCP) first outlined some of the basic elements of a constitution in its Party Program adopted during the 1st National Congress, although this was not a constitution. It stated that the CCP's ideology is Marxism–Leninism, and its ultimate goal is the realization of communism.

The 2nd National Congress in 1922 adopted the Party Program. The CCP's minimum program was a democratic revolution aimed at thoroughly opposing imperialism and feudalism. It stipulated the qualifications for party membership and the procedures for joining the party, organizational principles, organizational structure, discipline, and system.

The 3rd National Congress in 1923 amended the program to stipulate the rights and obligations of alternate and full members.

The 4th National Congress in 1925 amended the program to stipulate that party branches are the basic units of the party, change the title of Chairman of the Central Committee to General Secretary, and change the title of chairman of the executive committee of the CCP at all levels to Secretary.

The 5th National Congress in 1927 amended the program to stipulate that the CCP's organizational principle is democratic centralism, that the age for joining the party is 18 years or older, that the relationship between the party and the Youth League must be defined, and that in addition to electing one formal member of the Central Committee as General Secretary, the Central Committee must also elect several formal members of the Central Committee to organize the Politburo to guide all political work nationwide.

The 6th National Congress in 1928 amended the program to emphasize that the CCP was a branch of the Communist International, highlighting the leading position of the Communist International.

The CCP's 1945 constitution described Mao Zedong Thought as the party's working compass, writing it into the preamble. The 1945 constitution also discusses democracy in the context of New Democracy. Passed at the 7th National Congress, it was the first independently drafted by the CCP.

=== People's Republic of China ===
The 8th National Congress held in September 1956 removed Mao Zedong Thought from the guiding ideology list; declared that socialist transformation was complete and the socialist system was established; and made building a socialist economy the primary task.

The constitution adopted during April 1969 at the 9th National Congress named Lin Biao as Mao Zedong's "close comrade in arms and successor". The 9th Congress in April 1969 re-established Mao Zedong Thought as the CCP's guiding ideology. It affirmed the Cultural Revolution and the theory of continuing the revolution under the dictatorship of the proletariat.

The 10th National Congress in August 1973 removed the content that mentioned Lin Biao as the successor, and continued to affirm the Cultural Revolution.

The 11th National Congress in August 1977 reinstated the economic construction content of the 8th National Congress, set the Four Modernizations as the CCP's goal, and reinstated the Discipline Inspection Commissions at all levels. It continued to affirm the Cultural Revolution.

The constitution currently in force was adopted at the 12th National Congress in September 1982. Although the constitution has been revised since, its basic content continues to be the 1982 constitution. The constitution can be amended once every five years. The 12th Congress repudiated the Cultural Revolution and the theory of continuing the revolution under the dictatorship of the proletariat. It abolished the positions of chairman and Vice Chairmen of the Central Committee, stipulating that the General Secretary of the Central Committee would be the principal leader of the CCP Central Committee. It additionally established the Central Advisory Commission, stipulated an admission oath, and proposed the construction of "socialism with Chinese characteristics."

The 13th National Congress in October–November 1987 amended the constitution to expound the theory of the primary stage of socialism and formulated the "three-step" modernization development strategy.

The 14th National Congress in October 1992 established a socialist market economy system, proposed to arm the whole party with Deng Xiaoping's theory of building socialism with Chinese characteristics, and abolished the Central Advisory Commission. The 1992 revision of the constitution noted the importance of policy experimentation, incorporating language that the CCP "must boldly experiment with new methods, ... review new experience and solve new problems, and enrich and develop Marxism in practice."

The 15th National Congress in September 1997 established Deng Xiaoping Theory as the CCP's guiding ideology; and put forward its basic program for the primary stage of socialism.

==== 21st century ====
The 16th National Congress in November 2002 included the incorporation of the Three Represents. It also included the goal of building a moderately prosperous society.

The 17th National Congress in October 2007 included the incorporation of the Scientific Outlook on Development. It also included the theoretical system of socialism with Chinese characteristics.

The 18th National Congress in November 2012, saw the inclusion of the Scientific Outlook on Development as a "guiding ideology" of the party, 'upgraded' from simply an ideology to merely "follow and implement" when it was initially written into the constitution in 2007. The affirmation of socialism with Chinese characteristics as a "system" (zhidu) was written into the party constitution for the first time. The "construction of ecological civilization" (shengtai wenming) as a major goal of the party was also written into the party constitution, an extension from the previous version of the constitution which included economic, political, cultural, and social realms; this ostensibly increased the attention the party intended to focus on the environment.

The 19th National Congress in October 2017 ratified amendments including the incorporation of Xi Jinping Thought. General Secretary Xi Jinping thus became the first leader since Deng Xiaoping to append his name into party ideology; the change also led to many international media outlets calling Xi the "most powerful leader since Mao." The Belt and Road Initiative was also added to the party constitution. Amendments in 2017 also strengthened the role of party committees in state-owned enterprises.

The 20th National Congress in October 2022 saw several amendments to the party constitution. Additions included opposition to Taiwan independence, developing a "fighting spirit" and strengthening fighting ability, as well as additions of goals related to Xi, including gradually achieving common prosperity, promoting Chinese-style modernization and developing a "broader, fuller and more robust" whole-process people's democracy. The status of Xi and the CCP were further strengthened with the amendments, with the amended constitution naming the CCP as the "supreme political leadership force". The Two Upholds was added, thereby cementing the "core" status of Xi Jinping.

== Contents ==
The constitution consists of a General Principles and 11 chapters. The General Principles outline the basic principles and ideology of the CCP. It states that the CCP's "highest ideal and ultimate goal is the realization of communism". It outlines that Marxism–Leninism, Mao Zedong Thought, Deng Xiaoping Theory, the Theory of Three Represents, the Scientific Outlook on Development, and Xi Jinping Thought on Socialism with Chinese Characteristics for a New Era are the party's official ideology. The constitution emphasizes the party's role in promoting socialist democracy, in developing and strengthening a socialist legal system, and in consolidating public resolve to carry out the modernization program. The constitution defines the leadership of the CCP as the "most essential attribute of socialism with Chinese characteristics, and the greatest strength of this system". It adds that the "Party is the highest force for political leadership" and that it "exercises overall leadership over all areas of endeavor in every part of the country".

The first chapter is about CCP members. The constitution states that the interests of the people and the party are paramount over the interests of party members. The constitution states that in emergencies and urgent situations, members are encouraged to contribute to special funds (as in the case of the special fund for the 2008 Sichuan earthquake). The admission oath has been written into the constitution since 1982. The second chapter is about organizational structure. Since 1945, the party's constitution has defined the party's view of democratic centralism as "centralism based on democracy and democracy under centralized leadership." Academic Jean-Pierre Cabestan writes that this approach defines and limits democracy within the party, indicating that central leadership prevails over the rights of party members to challenge leadership. The third chapter is devoted to the central organization of the CCP, the fourth chapter covers local party organization, while the fifth chapter is about primary-level party organizations. The sixth chapter covers CCP cadres.

The seventh chapter covers party discipline, while the eighth chapter is regarding CCP disciplinary inspection organs. The ninth chapter outlines party groups. The tenth chapter outlines the relationship between the CCP and the Communist Youth League of China. The eleventh chapter outlines the party's symbols. Article 53 of the constitution declares the CCP emblem as composed of a hammer and sickle.

From 1922 to 1997, the constitution described the CCP as the vanguard or "vanguard organization" of the Chinese proletariat.
