= Culture of socialism with Chinese characteristics =

Chinese Communist Party ideology

- Simplified Chinese: 中国特色社会主义文化
- Traditional Chinese: 中國特色社會主義文化
Transcriptions
Standard Mandarin
- Hanyu Pinyin: Zhōngguó tèsè shèhuìzhǔyì wénhuà

The "culture of socialism with Chinese characteristics" is a term and slogan the Chinese Communist Party (CCP) uses to describe its cultural system. It is also one of the four components of socialism with Chinese characteristics.

== History ==
The term was first put forward at the 15th National Congress of the Chinese Communist Party in September 1997 by General Secretary Jiang Zemin.

== Content ==
According to the 19th CCP National Congress, the culture of socialism with Chinese characteristics "originates from the excellent traditional Chinese culture nurtured by the Chinese nation's 5,000-year history of civilization, fusing with the revolutionary culture and the advanced socialist culture created by the Party in leading the people in revolution, construction and reform". It officially aims to "cultivate citizens with ideals, morality, culture and discipline, and develop a national, scientific and popular socialist culture that is oriented towards modernization, the world and the future". It is one of the four components of socialism with Chinese characteristics, along with its path, theoretical system and system.
