= Theoretical system of socialism with Chinese characteristics =

Chinese Communist Party ideology

- Simplified Chinese: 中国特色社会主义理论体系
- Traditional Chinese: 中國特色社會主義理論體系
Transcriptions
Standard Mandarin
- Hanyu Pinyin: Zhōngguó tèsè shèhuìzhǔyì lǐlùn tǐxì

The "theoretical system of socialism with Chinese characteristics" is a term and slogan the Chinese Communist Party (CCP) uses to describe its ideology. It is also one of the four components of socialism with Chinese characteristics. Officially described as a scientific theoretical system, it consists of Deng Xiaoping Theory, Three Represents, Scientific Outlook on Development, and Xi Jinping Thought. It is officially described as the inheritance and development of Marxism–Leninism and Mao Zedong Thought.

== History ==
The term was first put forward at the 17th National Congress of the Chinese Communist Party in October 2007 by General Secretary Hu Jintao.

== Content ==
The theoretical system of socialism with Chinese characteristics consists of Deng Xiaoping Theory, the Theory Three Represents, the Scientific Outlook on Development, and Xi Jinping Thought on Socialism with Chinese Characteristics for a New Era. It is officially described as the inheritance and development of Marxism–Leninism and Mao Zedong Thought for the modern period. It is one of the four components of socialism with Chinese characteristics, along with its path, system and culture.
