= Scientific Outlook on Development =

Socio-economic principle of the Chinese Communist Party

- Simplified Chinese: 科学发展观
- Traditional Chinese: 科學發展觀
Transcriptions
Standard Mandarin
- Hanyu Pinyin: Kēxué Fāzhǎn Guān

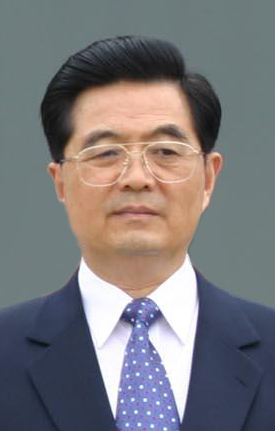
Former General Secretary Hu Jintao is credited with developing the Scientific Outlook on Development

The Scientific Outlook on Development (Note: 科学发展观; sometimes translated to either the scientific development concept, or as the scientific development perspective.) is a political doctrine of the Chinese Communist Party (CCP), credited to former Chinese leader Hu Jintao and his administration, who was in power from 2002 to 2012. The Scientific Outlook on Development incorporates scientific socialism, sustainable development, social welfare, a humanistic society, increased democracy, and, ultimately, the creation of a Socialist Harmonious Society. According to official statements by the CCP, the concept integrates "Marxism with the reality of contemporary China and with the underlying features of our times, and it fully embodies the Marxist worldview on and methodology for development."

The ideology was first introduced by Hu Jintao on 15 April 2003 while he was on the inspection tour in Guangdong. It is a component of the theoretical system of socialism with Chinese characteristics and is officially lauded as the development of Marxism–Leninism, Mao Zedong Thought, Deng Xiaoping Theory and the Three Represents. It was ratified into the CCP constitution at the 17th Party Congress in October 2007, and to the preamble of the Chinese Constitution at the first session of the 13th National People's Congress in March 2018.

== Development ==
On April 15, 2003, Hu Jintao put forward for the first time during his inspection in Guangdong : "We must adhere to a comprehensive outlook on development." On July 28 of the same year, Hu Jintao put forward in a more complete way at the National SARS Prevention and Control Work Conference: "We must better adhere to the development concept of coordinated development, all-round development, and sustainable development." This is considered Scientific Outlook on Development. The first appearance of the term. Political theorist Wang Huning is considered to be influential in the developing of the term.

On October 14, 2003, at the Third Plenary Session of the 16th Central Committee of the Chinese Communist Party, Hu Jintao clearly put forward "Adhere to people-oriented, establish a comprehensive, coordinated and sustainable development concept, and promote the all-round economic, social and human development." The meeting put the spirit of Hu Jintao's speech into the final resolution, and the concept of the scientific development concept was perfected and formally established as one of the ruling ideas of the Chinese Communist Party.

After that, the Central Committee of the Chinese Communist Party quickly organized the "Special Research Class on the Establishment and Implementation of the Scientific Outlook on Development by Provincial and Ministerial Leading Cadres". On February 29, 2004, at the completion ceremony of the seminar, Wen Jiabao asked the whole party to "unify thinking and strengthen Establish and conscientiously implement the scientific outlook on development" and raise the scientific outlook on development to the height of the "unified thinking" of the whole party.

On March 10, 2004, Hu Jintao delivered a speech on the scientific outlook on development at the Central Forum on Population, Resources and Environment, "To achieve the goal of building a well-off society in an all-round way and create a new situation in the cause of socialism with Chinese characteristics, we must adhere to the implementation of the " Three Representing the "important thinking and the spirit of the 16th National Congress", firmly establish and conscientiously implement the people-oriented, comprehensive, coordinated, and sustainable development concept, and earnestly grasp development, the party's first priority in governing and rejuvenating the country.", referring to the scientific development concept Parallel to the "Three Represents", it is considered to be the most complete and comprehensive exposition of the scientific outlook on development so far.

On November 21, 2007, the Scientific Outlook on Development was written into the Party Constitution at the 17th National Congress of the Chinese Communist Party. Beginning in September 2008, the Politburo of the CCP Central Committee held a meeting on September 5, 2008, and decided to start in September 2008, in about one and a half years, to carry out in-depth study and practice of the scientific concept of development activities throughout the party in batches.

The first batch started in September 2008 and was basically completed in February 2009. Including: central and state organs, provincial (autonomous region, municipality) party and government organs; national, provincial (autonomous region, municipality) people's congresses, CPPCC organs, people's courts, people's procuratorates, and people's organizations organs; Xinjiang Production and Construction Corps organs; centrally managed financial institutions And its branches; public institutions directly under the Party Central Committee and the State Council, public institutions directly under the Central Committee, public institutions managed by various departments of the central government, and public institutions directly under the provincial (autonomous region, municipality).

The second batch: started in March 2009 and was basically completed in August 2009. Including: city (prefecture, state, league), county (city, district, banner) party and government organs; city (prefecture, state, league), county (city, district, banner) people's congress, CPPCC organs, people's courts, and people's procuratorates And people's organizations and organizations; divisions and regiments of Xinjiang Production and Construction Corps; central enterprises; enterprises directly under provinces (autonomous regions, municipalities), enterprises and institutions directly under cities (prefectures, states, and leagues); colleges and universities, secondary professional schools.

The third batch: started in September 2009 and was basically completed in February 2010. Including: townships (towns), neighborhoods; villages, communities; Xinjiang Production and Construction Corps grassroots units; primary and secondary schools; enterprises, social organizations, and social intermediary organizations that did not participate in the second batch of activities.

== Content ==
The Scientific Outlook on Development reflected a departure from Jiang Zemin's Three Represents in that it laid emphasis on correcting the unbalanced growth that had been much more favorable to wealthier, coastal provinces, neglecting the Chinese inland. It also put more emphasis on the masses rather than the elites, according to David Shambaugh. According to official statements by the CCP, the concept integrates "Marxism with the reality of contemporary China and with the underlying features of our times, and it fully embodies the Marxist worldview on and methodology for development."

Humanism is at the center of the scientific development concept. The people-oriented concept is "to take the interests of the people as the starting point and end point of all work, to continuously meet people's multifaceted needs and promote the overall development of people." It includes four specific aspects:

- On the basis of economic development, continuously improve the people's material and cultural living standards and health standards
- Respect and protect human rights, including the political, economic and cultural rights of citizens
- Continuously improve people's ideological and moral quality, scientific and cultural quality and health quality
- Create a social environment where people develop equally and give full play to their intelligence.

The Scientific Outlook on Development aims to address income inequality, environmental degradation, reducing regional inequalities, supporting farmers and migrants, increasing budget resources for pensions, healthcare, and education.

== Legacy ==
Some observers attribute the political origins of China's low-carbon development strategy to this concept, although some industrial support in low-carbon technology had already begun before Hu's formulation of the Scientific Outlook on Development.

By around 2005 Hu Jintao was using the Scientific Outlook on Development concept as a catch-all for a wide variety of policies that had no other unifying theme. These included: improving rural areas, speeding up economic growth, using resources efficiently, and more.

Consistent with the Scientific Outlook on Development, China's 10th Five-Year Plan and 11th Five-Year Plan clarified specific targets for reducing water pollution. Water quality significantly improved after the 11th Five Year Plan.

In March 2018, at the first session of the 13th National People's Congress, the Chinese constitution was amended to include the Scientific Outlook on Development into the preamble.

== See also ==
- History of China (2002–2012)
