= System of socialism with Chinese characteristics =

Chinese Communist Party ideology

- Simplified Chinese: 中国特色社会主义制度
- Traditional Chinese: 中國特色社會主義制度
Transcriptions
Standard Mandarin
- Hanyu Pinyin: Zhōngguó tèsè shèhuìzhǔyì zhìdù

The "system of socialism with Chinese characteristics" is a term and slogan the Chinese Communist Party (CCP) uses to describe the political system of the People's Republic of China (PRC). It is also one of the four components of socialism with Chinese characteristics.

== History ==
The term "system of socialism with Chinese characteristics" was first put forward at the 90th anniversary of the CCP on 1 July 2011 by General Secretary Hu Jintao.

== Content ==
The term includes the system of people's congress, the system of multi-party cooperation and political consultation under the leadership of the CCP, the system of regional ethnic autonomy, and the system of community-level self-governance. It additionally includes the socialist legal system with Chinese characteristics, the basic economic system of public ownership as the main body, the common development of multiple ownership economies, distribution according to work as the main body, the coexistence of multiple distribution methods, the socialist market economic system, and various other systems in the economy, politics, culture and society. According to CCP General Secretary Xi Jinping, the leadership of the CCP is "the greatest strength of the system of socialism with Chinese characteristics". It is one of the four components of socialism with Chinese characteristics, along with its path, theoretical system and culture.
