= Path of socialism with Chinese characteristics =

Chinese Communist Party ideology

- Simplified Chinese: 中国特色社会主义道路
- Traditional Chinese: 中國特色社會主義道路
Transcriptions
Standard Mandarin
- Hanyu Pinyin: Zhōngguó tèsè shèhuìzhǔyì dàolù

The "path of socialism with Chinese characteristics" is a term and slogan the Chinese Communist Party (CCP) uses to describe its program. It is also one of the four components of socialism with Chinese characteristics.

== History ==
The term was first put forward at the 12th National Congress of the Chinese Communist Party in September 1982 by Deng Xiaoping.

== Content ==
According to the path of socialism with Chinese characteristics, under the CCP's leadership, China must base it on the basic national conditions, focus on economic development, adhere to the Four Cardinal Principles and to Reform and Opening Up, liberate and develop social productive forces, construct a socialist market economy, socialist democratic politics, socialist advanced culture, socialist harmonious society and socialist ecological civilization, promote the development of people, gradually realize common prosperity, build a prosperous, democratic, civilized, harmonious, and beautiful socialist modern country, and achieve the great rejuvenation of the Chinese nation. It is one of the four components of socialism with Chinese characteristics, along with its theoretical system, system and culture.
