= Socialism with Chinese characteristics =

Chinese Communist Party term

- Simplified Chinese: 中国特色社会主义
- Traditional Chinese: 中國特色社會主義
- Hanyu Pinyin: Zhōngguó tèsè shèhuìzhǔyì
Transcriptions
Standard Mandarin
- Hanyu Pinyin: Zhōngguó tèsè shèhuìzhǔyì
- Bopomofo: ㄓㄨㄥ ㄍㄨㄛˊ ㄊㄜˋ ㄙㄜˋ ㄕㄜˋ ㄏㄨㄟˋ ㄓㄨˇ ㄧˋ
- Wade–Giles: Chung^{1}-kuo^{2} t'e^{4}-se^{4} she^{4}-hui^{4}-chu^{3}-i^{4}
- Tongyong Pinyin: Jhongguó tè-sè shè-huèi-jhǔ-yì
- IPA: [ʈʂʊ́ŋ.kwǒ tʰɤ̂.sɤ̂ ʂɤ̂.xwêɪ.ʈʂù.î]

Socialism with Chinese characteristics (Chinese: 中国特色社会主义; pinyin: Zhōngguó tèsè shèhuìzhǔyì; Mandarin: [ʈʂʊ́ŋ.kwǒ tʰɤ̂.sɤ̂ ʂɤ̂.xwêɪ.ʈʂù.î]) is a term used by the Chinese Communist Party (CCP) and the People's Republic of China (PRC) to encompass its political theories and policies.

The term was coined by Deng Xiaoping in 1982 and was largely associated with Deng's overall program of adopting elements of market economics as a means to foster growth using foreign direct investment and to increase productivity (especially in the countryside where 80% of China's population lived) while the CCP retained both its formal commitment to achieve communism and its monopoly on political power. In the party's official narrative, socialism with Chinese characteristics is Marxism adapted to Chinese conditions and a product of scientific socialism. The theory stipulated that China was in the primary stage of socialism due to its relatively low level of material wealth and needed to engage in economic growth before it pursued a more egalitarian form of socialism, which in turn would lead to a communist society described in Marxist orthodoxy.

In 2018, the term was amended to the state constitution. According to CCP ideology, socialism with Chinese characteristics consists of a path, a theoretical system, a system, and a culture. The path outlines the policies guiding the CCP. The theoretical system consists of Deng Xiaoping Theory, Three Represents (Jiang Zemin), Scientific Outlook on Development (Hu Jintao), and Xi Jinping Thought. Xi Jinping Thought is considered to represent Marxist–Leninist policies suited for China's present condition while Deng Xiaoping Theory was considered relevant for the period when it was formulated. The term is seen by proponents as representing the Sinicization of Marxism.

== Development ==
The term was first used by Chinese leader Deng Xiaoping on 1 September 1982 in the opening speech of the 12th National Congress of the Chinese Communist Party. Deng said "We must integrate the universal truth of Marxism with the concrete realities of China, and blaze a path of our own and build Socialism with Chinese Characteristics". The 19th Party National Congress in 2017 declared that China and the CCP entered a "new era of socialism with Chinese characteristics" in 2012, which it said was both consistent with and significantly different from the past nearly 40 years of reform and opening up.

== Content ==
According to the State Council Information Office (SCIO), socialism with Chinese characteristics is "premised on the fact that China is in the primary stage of socialism" and that all reform initiatives and aspects of China's work should be taken in that context. The SCIO states that the "overall approach to building socialism with Chinese characteristics" is to "promote economic, political, cultural, social and ecological progress" with "economic development as its central pillar". It also states the overall goal of socialism with Chinese characteristics is "socialist modernization and the great rejuvenation of the Chinese nation".

Article 1 of the country's constitution states, "Leadership of the Communist Party of China is the defining feature of socialism with Chinese characteristics." According to official explanations, socialism with Chinese characteristics consists of a "path", a "theoretical system", a "system", and a "culture":

- The path of socialism with Chinese characteristics establishes that, under the CCP's leadership, China must base it on the basic national conditions, focus on economic development, adhere to the Four Cardinal Principles and to Reform and Opening Up, liberate and develop social productive forces, construct a "socialist market economy, socialist democratic politics, socialist advanced culture, socialist harmonious society and socialist ecological civilization," promote the development of people, gradually realize common prosperity, build a "prosperous, democratic, civilized, harmonious, and beautiful socialist modern country", and achieve the great rejuvenation of the Chinese nation.
- The theoretical system of socialism with Chinese characteristics is the "scientific theoretical system", consisting of Deng Xiaoping Theory, Three Represents, Scientific Outlook on Development, and Xi Jinping Thought. It is officially described as the inheritance and development of Marxism–Leninism and Mao Zedong Thought.
- The system of socialism with Chinese characteristics includes the system of people's congresses, the system of multi-party cooperation and political consultation under the leadership of the CCP, the system of regional ethnic autonomy, and the system of community-level self-governance. It additionally includes the socialist legal system with Chinese characteristics, the socialist market economic system, and various other systems in the economy, politics, culture and society. According to CCP General Secretary Xi Jinping, the leadership of the CCP is "the greatest strength of the system of socialism with Chinese characteristics".
- The culture of socialism with Chinese characteristics, according to the 19th CCP National Congress, "originates from the excellent traditional Chinese culture nurtured by the Chinese nation's 5,000-year history of civilization, fusing with the revolutionary culture and the advanced socialist culture created by the Party in leading the people in revolution, construction and reform". It officially aims to "cultivate citizens with ideals, morality, culture and discipline, and develop a national, scientific and popular socialist culture that is oriented towards modernization, the world and the future".

== Primary stage of socialism ==
=== During the Mao era ===
The concept of a primary stage of socialism was conceived before the People's Republic of China introduced the reform and opening up. In the early 1950s, economists Yu Guangyuan, Xue Muqiao and Sun Yefang raised the question of socialist transformation in which China's economy of low productive force was in a transitional period, a position which Mao Zedong, the Chairman of the Chinese Communist Party, endorsed briefly until 1957. When discussing the necessity of commodity relations at the 1st Zhengzhou Conference (2–10 November 1958), for example, Mao said that China was in the "initial stage of socialism". However, Mao never elaborated on the idea and his successors were left to do this.

=== After Mao Zedong's death ===
Some have called our road "Social Capitalism", others "State Capitalism", and yet others "Technocratic Capitalism". These are all completely wrong. We respond that socialism with Chinese characteristics is socialism, by which we mean that despite reform we adhere to the socialist road – our road, our theory, our system, and the goals we set out at the 18th National Party Congress. ... Socialism with Chinese characteristics is the dialectical unity of the theoretical logic of scientific socialism and the historical logic of China's social development. It's scientific socialism rooted in Chinese realities, reflecting the will of Chinese people, and adapted to the requirements of China and its circumstances.

— Xi Jinping, speech to the Central Committee of the Chinese Communist Party, 5 January 2013

On 5 May 1978, an article titled "Implementation of the Socialist Principle of Distribution According to Work" (贯彻执行按劳分配的社会主义原则) elaborated on the idea that China was still at the first stage of reaching a communist society and that it had not become a truly socialist society. The article was written by members in the State Council's Political Research Office led by economist Yu Guangyuan on the orders of Deng Xiaoping so as to "criticize and repudiate" the beliefs of the communist left. After reading it, Deng himself authored a brief memo saying that it was "well-written, and shows that the nature of distribution by labor is not capitalist, but socialist [...] [and] to implement this principle, many things are to be done, and many institutions to be revived. In all, this is to give incentives for us to do better". The term reappeared at the 6th plenum of the 11th Central Committee on 27 June 1981 in the document "Resolution on Certain Questions in the History of our Party since the Founding of the PRC". Hu Yaobang, the CCP General Secretary, used the term in his report to the 12th National Congress on 1 September 1982. It was not until the Resolution Concerning the Guiding Principle in Building Socialist Spiritual Civilization at the 6th plenum of the 12th Central Committee that the term was used in the defense of the economic reforms which were being introduced.

At the 13th National Congress, acting General Secretary Zhao Ziyang on behalf of the 12th Central Committee delivered the report "Advance Along the Road of Socialism with Chinese characteristics". He wrote that China was a socialist society, but that socialism in China was in its primary stage, a Chinese peculiarity which was due to the undeveloped state of the country's productive forces. During this phase of development, Zhao recommended introducing a planned commodity economy on the basis of public ownership. The main failure of the communist right according to Zhao was that they failed to acknowledge that China could reach socialism by bypassing capitalism. The main failure of the communist left was that they held the "utopian position" that China could bypass the primary stage of socialism in which the productive forces are to be modernized.

On 5 October 1987, Yu Guangyuan, a major author of the concept, published an article entitled "Economy in the Initial Stage of Socialism" and speculated that this historical stage will last for two decades and perhaps much longer. This represents, says Ian Wilson, "a severe blight on the expectations raised during the early 70s, when the old eight-grade wage scale was being compressed to only three levels and a more even distributive system was assumed to be an important national goal". On 25 October, Zhao further expounded on the concept of the primary stage of socialism and said that the party line was to follow "One Center, Two Basic Points"—the central focus of the Chinese state was economic development, but that this should occur simultaneously through centralized political control (i.e. the Four Cardinal Principles) and upholding the policy of reform and opening up.

General Secretary Jiang Zemin further elaborated on the concept ten years later, first during a speech to the CCP Central Party School on 29 May 1997 and again in his report to the 15th National Congress on 12 September. According to Jiang, the 3rd plenum of the 11th Central Committee correctly analyzed and formulated a scientifically correct program for the problems facing China and socialism. In Jiang's words, the primary stage of socialism was an "undeveloped stage". The fundamental task of socialism is to develop the productive forces, therefore the main aim during the primary stage should be the further development of the national productive forces. The primary contradiction in Chinese society during the primary stage of socialism is "the growing material and cultural needs of the people and the backwardness of production". This contradiction will remain until China has completed the process of primary stage of socialism—and because of it—economic development should remain the party's main focus during this stage.

Jiang elaborated on three points to develop the primary stage of socialism. The first—to develop a socialist economy with Chinese characteristics—meant developing the economy by emancipating and modernizing the forces of production while developing a market economy. The second—building socialist politics with Chinese characteristics—meant "managing state affairs according to the law", developing socialist democracy under the party and making the "people the masters of the country". The third point—building socialist culture with Chinese characteristics—meant turning Marxism into the guide to train the people so as to give them "high ideals, moral integrity, a good education, and a strong sense of discipline, and developing a national scientific, and popular socialist culture geared to the needs of modernization, of the world, and of the future".

When asked about how long the primary stage of socialism would last, Zhao replied "[i]t will be at least 100 years [...] [before] socialist modernization will have been in the most part accomplished". As with Zhao, Jiang believed that it would take at least 100 years to reach a more advanced stage.

== Socialist market economy ==
What is socialism and what is Marxism? We were not quite clear about this in the past. Marxism attaches utmost importance to developing the productive forces. We have said that socialism is the primary stage of communism and that at the advanced stage the principle of from each according to his ability and to each according to his needs will be applied. This calls for highly developed productive forces and an overwhelming abundance of material wealth. Therefore, the fundamental task for the socialist stage is to develop the productive forces. The superiority of the socialist system is demonstrated, in the final analysis, by faster and greater development of those forces than under the capitalist system. As they develop, the people's material and cultural life will constantly improve. One of our shortcomings after the founding of the People's Republic was that we didn't pay enough attention to developing the productive forces. Socialism means eliminating poverty. Pauperism is not socialism, still less communism.

— Deng Xiaoping, speech discussing Marxist theory at a Central Committee plenum, 30 June 1984

Deng Xiaoping, the architect of the reform and opening up, did not believe that the market economy was synonymous with capitalism or that planning was synonymous with socialism. During his southern tour, he said that "planning and market forces are not the essential difference between socialism and capitalism. A planned economy is not the definition of socialism, because there is planning under capitalism; the market economy happens under socialism, too. Planning and market forces are both ways of controlling economic activity".

=== Ideological justification ===
In the 1980s, it became evident to Chinese economists that the Marxist theory of the law of value—understood as the expression of the labor theory of value—could not serve as the basis of China's pricing system. They concluded that Marx never intended his theory of law of value to work "as an expression of 'concretized labor time'". Marx's notion of "prices of production" was meaningless to the Soviet-styled planned economies since price formations were according to Marx established by markets. Soviet planners had used the law of value as a basis to rationalize prices in the planned economy. According to Soviet sources, prices were "planned with an eye to the [...] basic requirements of the law of value". However, the primary fault with the Soviet interpretation was that they tried to calibrate prices without a competitive market since according to Marx competitive markets allowed for an equilibrium of profit rates which led to an increase in the prices of production. The rejection of the Soviet interpretation of the law of value led to the acceptance of the idea that China was still in the primary stage of socialism. The basic argument was that conditions envisaged by Marx for reaching the socialist stage of development did not yet exist in China.

Mao said that the imposition of "progressive relations of production" would revolutionize production. His successor's rejection of this view according to A. James Gregor has thwarted the ideological continuity of Maoism—officially Mao Zedong Thought. Classical Marxism had argued that a socialist revolution would only take place in advanced capitalist societies and its success would signal the transition from a capitalist commodity-based economy to a "product economy" in which goods would be distributed for people's need and not for profit. If because of a lack of a coherent explanation in the chance of failure this revolution did not occur, the revolutionaries would be forced to take over the responsibilities of the bourgeoisie. Chinese communists are thus looking for a new Marxist theory of development. CCP theorist Luo Rongqu recognized that the founders of Marxism had never "formulated any systematic theory on the development of the non-Western world" and said that the CCP should "establish their own synthesized theoretical framework to study the problem of modern development". According to A. James Gregor, the implication of this stance is that "Chinese Marxism is currently in a state of profound theoretical discontinuity".

According to academics Xinru Ma and David C. Kang, socialism with Chinese characteristics is restricted to China itself and focuses on China's own ideology and practices. Ma and Kang write that in its foreign relations with other Global South countries, China does not attempt to export the ideology of Socialism with Chinese characteristics.

=== Private ownership ===
The Chinese government's understanding of private ownership is claimed to be rooted in classical Marxism. According to party theorists, since China adopted state ownership when it was a semi-feudal and semi-colonial country, it is claimed to be in the primary stage of socialism. Because of this, certain policies and system characteristics—such as commodity production for the market, the existence of a private sector and the reliance of the profit motive in enterprise management—were changed. These changes were allowed as long as they improved productivity and modernized the means of production, thus furthering the development of socialism.

The CCP still considers private ownership to be non-socialist. However, according to party theorists, the existence and growth of private ownership does not necessarily undermine socialism or promote capitalism in China. They argue that Karl Marx and Friedrich Engels never proposed the immediate abolishment of private ownership. According to Engels' book Principles of Communism, the proletariat can only abolish private ownership when the necessary conditions have been met. In the phase before the abolishment of private ownership, Engels proposed progressive taxation, high inheritance taxes and compulsory bond purchases to restrict private property, while using the competitive powers of state-owned enterprises to expand the public sector. Marx and Engels proposed similar measures in The Communist Manifesto with regard to advanced countries, but since China was economically undeveloped, party theorists called for flexibility regarding the party's handling of private property. According to party theorist Liu Shuiyuan, the New Economic Policy program initiated by Soviet authorities in the aftermath of the war communism program is a good example of flexibility by socialist authorities.

Party theorist Li Xuai said that private ownership inevitably involved capitalist exploitation. However, Li regards private property and exploitation as necessary in the primary stage of socialism, stating that capitalism in its primary stage uses remnants of the old society to build itself. Sun Liancheng and Lin Huiyong said that Marx and Engels—in their interpretation of The Communist Manifesto—criticized private ownership when it was owned solely by the bourgeoisie, but not individual ownership in which everyone owns the means of production, hence this cannot be exploited by others. Individual ownership is considered consistent with socialism, since Marx wrote that a post-capitalist society would entail the rebuilding of "associated social individual ownership".

== See also ==
- Ideology of the Chinese Communist Party
- Revisionism (Marxism)
- Socialist ideology of the Kuomintang
- Socialism in one country
- Socialist market economy
- State capitalism
- Party-state capitalism
- Left-conservatism
- Neoauthoritarianism
- State socialism
