= Committee of 100 (United States) =

Leadership organization for Chinese Americans

- 百人会
- Formation: 1990; 36 years ago
- Type: 501(c)(3) organization
- Tax ID no.: 13-3627542
- Headquarters: 28 West 44th Street, Suite 1014, New York, NY 10036
- Website: www.committee100.org

Committee of 100
- Traditional Chinese: 百人會
- Simplified Chinese: 百人会
- Literal meaning: hundred-person association
Transcriptions
Standard Mandarin
- Hanyu Pinyin: Bǎi rén huì
- Gwoyeu Romatzyh: Bae ren huey
- Wade–Giles: Pai^{3} jen^{2} hui^{4}
- Tongyong Pinyin: Bǎi rén huèi
Yue: Cantonese
- Yale Romanization: Bai3 ren2 hwei4
- Jyutping: Baak3 jan4 wui4
Southern Min
- Hokkien POJ: Pah-lâng-hōe

The Committee of 100 is a 501(c)(3) organization of prominent Chinese Americans in business, government, academia and the arts whose stated aim is "to encourage constructive relations between the peoples of the United States and Greater China." It was founded in 1990 by I. M. Pei.

Its current chair is Gary Locke, former U.S. Ambassador to China, the 36th Secretary of Commerce, and former Governor of Washington State (1997–2005).

== History ==
The Committee of 100 was established in 1990 following the 1989 Tiananmen Square massacre, led to international condemnation of China's actions and a deterioration in U.S.-China relations. Upon hearing about the massacre, Founder I.M. Pei wrote an opinion piece for The New York Times titled "China Won't Ever Be the Same", in which he expressed his "a desire to do something for [his] land of birth and heritage", referring to China. With the encouragement of Henry Kissinger, Pei, along with other notable Asian American figures such as cellist Yo-Yo Ma and physicist Chien Shiung Wu, founded the committee in order to address relations between the people of the United States and China.

The organization focuses on issues of importance to the Chinese American community and China-United States relations. The committee additionally aims to serve as cultural ambassadors and to foster the exchange of ideas and various perspectives among its membership with those in the community and government. Committee delegations have been invited to give briefings to top officials at the White House and Zhongnanhai. More recently, the organization has been involved in highlighting the discrimination and racial profiling faced by the Asian American population, most notably during the COVID-19 pandemic and the China Initiative.

The committee has been described as avoiding criticism of the Chinese Communist Party (CCP) and its policies. A 2018 report by the Hoover Institution and a 2020 Newsweek report noted that committee members have been targets of the CCP's United Front Work Department pressure and influence operations. In 2024, the committee was one of several organizations that opposed the reauthorization of the United States House Select Committee on Strategic Competition between the United States and the Chinese Communist Party.

Past chairs for the Committee of 100 have included Henry S. Tang, John S. Chen, Frank H. Wu, and H. Roger Wang. In 2024, the organization reported revenue of US$3.3 million.

== Advocacy ==
=== Wen Ho Lee case ===
When Taiwanese-born nuclear physicist Wen Ho Lee was arrested and held in solitary confinement due to allegedly revealing nuclear secrets to China, the Committee of 100, along with other Asian American organizations raised national awareness about Lee's alleged denial of due process and discrimination based on race. The Committee of 100 was part of the Coalition Against Racial and Ethnic Scapegoating, which wrote an amicus curiae brief to support Lee's argument of being persecuted based on race. Scholars note that the Committee of 100 played a central role in highlighting the racial profiling experienced by Wen Ho Lee, although the organization did not initially explicitly support Lee's innocence.

=== China Initiative ===
The Committee of 100 criticized the Department of Justice's China Initiative, which was launched in 2018 to counter foregin economic espionage. The Committee presented research arguing that the initiative disproportionately targeted Chinese researchers and condemned the racial profiling occurring due to the initiative. In February 2022, the Committee formally issued a statement calling on the Department of Justice to end the China Initiative. Later that month, the DOJ announced that they would re-examine the initiative, and later ended it. In February 2024, the FBI addressed the Committee of 100, issusing a statement of apology for the negative impact of the China Initiative on the Asian American community.

=== Research on discrimination ===
The Committee of 100 has published various studies examining the discrimination and racial profiling experienced by Asian Americans. Topics vary from discussing racial disparities in the Economic Espionage Act prosecutions to the surge in anti-Chinese racism experienced by Asian Americans during the COVID-19 pandemic, co-authored with Columbia University researchers.

== See also ==
- US-China Business Council
