= Patriotic education in China =

Chinese Communist Party campaigns

Patriotic education
- Simplified Chinese: 爱国主义教育
- Traditional Chinese: 愛國主義教育
Transcriptions
Standard Mandarin
- Hanyu Pinyin: Àiguózhǔyì Jiàoyù

Patriotic education in the People's Republic of China is a propaganda and education campaign and policy launched by the Chinese Communist Party for young people. It was initiated in 1991 but not carried out in full scale until 1994. In May 1995, the Chinese government issued the "Notice on Recommending Hundreds of Patriotic Education Books to Primary and Middle Schools across the Country", and made a list of a hundred patriotic films, a hundred patriotic songs, a hundred patriotic books. The main goal of the campaign was to "boost the nation's spirit, enhance cohesion, and foster national self esteem and pride". In 2024, the Patriotic Education Law codified the campaign into law.

This was done through education that was designed to construct a historical memory of what the People's Republic of China (PRC) was created from, by emphasizing the role the Chinese Communist Party (CCP) in securing national independence, and the influence of foreign countries on China. This aim was to boost the CCP's legitimacy, which during the 1980s had declined, particularly around the time of the 1989 Tiananmen Square protests and massacre. Academic Suisheng Zhao has said the campaign is part of a strategy to make the CCP the "paramount patriotic force and guardian of national pride."

== Ideology ==
=== Guiding ideology ===
According to the 1994 "Outline", patriotism education focuses on young people and takes socialism with Chinese characteristics and the party's basic line as the guide. The main content covers the history of China, the traditional culture of China, and the beliefs of the CCP. The outline also promotes Chinese nationalism. In 2019 the "Outline for the Implementation of Patriotic Education in the New Era" was implemented which contains expositions by CCP General Secretary Xi Jinping, and tenets of Xi Jinping Thought such as the Chinese dream.

== Background ==
In the post-Cold War era the Chinese Communist Party promoted a policy of Chinese Nationalism. This form of nationalism had a long history of political utilisation in China, first appearing during the Qing dynasty when China suffered a humiliating defeat in the First Sino-Japanese War and growing over the course of the 20th century as China faced various military conquests at the hands of various colonial powers, Western and Japanese.

Following the Communist Party's 1949 victory in the Chinese Civil War, CCP Chairman Mao Zedong employed Chinese nationalism as a political tool used to bolster Chinese patriotism and party loyalty; seeking to closely align Chinese national identity with a sense of fidelity to the Communist Party. During the Cold War, Chinese Nationalism was promoted as a uniting national philosophy in Chinese cultural and educational institutions and was used to justify the Party's suppression of separatist and secessionist movements in Western provinces.

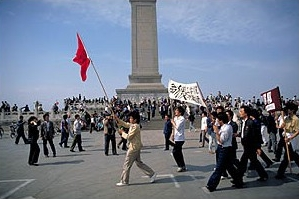
Students participate in a pro-democracy protest in Tiananmen Square, Beijing in 1989.

In the 1980s a growing pro-democracy movement emerged in China, culminating in the 1989 Tiananmen Square Protests. The Chinese Communist Party, feeling increasingly threatened by the movement and the increasingly drastic lengths to which protesters would go in order to advocate political reform, sought to institute the patriotic education campaign to combat the rising wave of anti-Party sentiment associated with the movement. The patriotic education campaign constituted a modern iteration of the Chinese Nationalist vision and was designed to foster increased party loyalty among a generation of young Chinese students born under the leadership of Deng Xiaoping and therefore too young to remember the Communist Party, and China, of Mao Zedong.

The Chinese Nationalist-bent of the patriotic education campaign was not immediately guaranteed in the aftermath of the Tiananmen Square Protests however. While consensus existed within the Party regarding the need for a more targeted political education of the younger generation in order to foster increased support for the CPP, two party factions, the conservatives and the reformists, emerged with competing ideological visions of the legitimisation strategy that should be employed in youth political education. Both factions agreed that Marxism–Leninism and Mao Zedong Thought no longer served to sufficiently legitimise CCP rule, yet while the conservative faction argued for a strengthening of the position of Maoist ideology in political education, the reformist faction, led by Deng Xiaoping, saw Chinese Nationalism as the solution.

Ultimately, the patriotic education campaign was one of the Communist Party's key initiatives emerging from the 1990 National Morality Conference. The Conference and Campaign both reflected a view that failures of moral education had allowed the emergence of the Student Movement which had culminated in the Tiananmen protests. As such, the party endorsed a plan to reinvigorate educational moralising in order to prevent further subversive youth movements.

The patriotic education campaign was commenced following a period of relative political stability in the post-Tiananmen years and Deng Xiaoping's Southern Tour of 1992. It was to become an extensive youth education campaign that primarily targeted school students and intellectuals. The Chinese Central Propaganda Department published "The Outline for Conducting Patriotic Education" on 6 September 1994, codifying the CCP's vision for education in patriotism.

== Content and administration ==
Following the legitimacy crisis suffered by the CCP in 1989, the patriotic education campaign was instituted to reorient the party's ideological position and foster a new wave of Chinese Nationalism. The new nationalism of the campaign was proffered in direct opposition to Marxism–Leninism which had been the guiding ideology of the Mao era, and was now largely considered outmoded by party elites.

The patriotic education campaign included three main components. The first was the institutionalisation of patriotic education, the second involved reforms in history education, and the third was the large-scale construction of 'patriotic education sites.'

=== Institutionalisation of patriotic education ===
The first arm of the patriotic education campaign sought to modernise official CCP discourses, to reflect the party's vision of itself as the key defender of Chinese national interests and invigorator of the nation. The change was operationalised through measures such as directives requiring the People's Daily, the official media outlet of the CCP, to increase use of patriotic rhetoric.

The CCP sought to create a favourable social environment for the patriotic education campaign and promoted its ideals through all available propaganda streams including books, magazines, newspapers, television and radio programs, film, visual art and mass rallies. Additionally, mass displays of patriotic sentiment were organised for traditional holidays such as the Lunar New Year, the National Day, Labour Day, Army Day, the Party's Birthday and Children's Day.

=== Reforms in history education ===
Reforms to Chinese history education were implemented following the 1989 military crackdown. The reforms sought to reframe the fundamental narrative of Chinese modern history in a manner which highlighted the national humiliations of the modern era, rather than emphasising the class struggle, as had been a priority of history education during the Cold War Era. The reformed history syllabus sought to portray the CCP as more than merely the voice of the proletariat. It credited the party with having ended China's hundred years of diplomatic humiliation.

In 1992, the educational reforms also modified the national history curriculum, extending the study of Chinese history into high school. Previously only middle school students were required to study Chinese history, which was taught as background to the study of world history.

=== Large-scale construction of 'Patriotic Education Sites' ===
'Patriotic Education Sites' was the term employed by the CCP for the national museums and public monuments that were constructed after 1989. These memorial sites were considered vital to the broader project of national mythmaking. The sites were intended to visualise national myths which reframed collective memory as a tool to glorify the status quo and denounce enemies of the CCP. Between 1995 and 2009, 353 national-level patriotic education sites had been erected or renovated throughout the country. The construction of Patriotic Education Sites in four distinct waves of development in 1997, 2001, 2005, and 2009, is said to suggest that the sites were erected according to a deliberate, pre-planned programme of the central government.

Sites were designed to cover a diverse range of historical memories, addressing popular topics of Chinese history. Some of the topics memorialised with newly constructed or renovated sites include the Second Sino-Japanese War (1931–45), the Chinese Civil War fought between the Communist Party and the Kuomintang, the history of ancient Chinese civilisation and the lives of the leaders of the early CCP. Topics were tied in some manner to the cities that housed their sites. For instance, the Mao Zedong Memorial Museum was located in the former leader's hometown, and the Nanjing Massacre Memorial Hall memorialised the massacre which took place there in 1937.

The role of the Patriotic Education Sites in seeking to counter the anti-regime sentiment which had emerged during the pro-democracy movement is evident in the fact that the CCP deliberately constructed more Patriotic Education Sites in and around cities which had housed the longest lasting anti-regime protests in 1989. This targeted construction appears to have been successful in fostering Chinese Nationalism. During the 2012 China Anti-Japanese Demonstrations, for instance, cities with Patriotic Education Sites held anti-Japanese protests at a higher rate than their counterparts without such sites.

== Major themes ==
Two major themes dominated the patriotic education campaign. The first was Chinese history and tradition, and the second was territorial integrity and national unity.

=== Chinese history and tradition ===
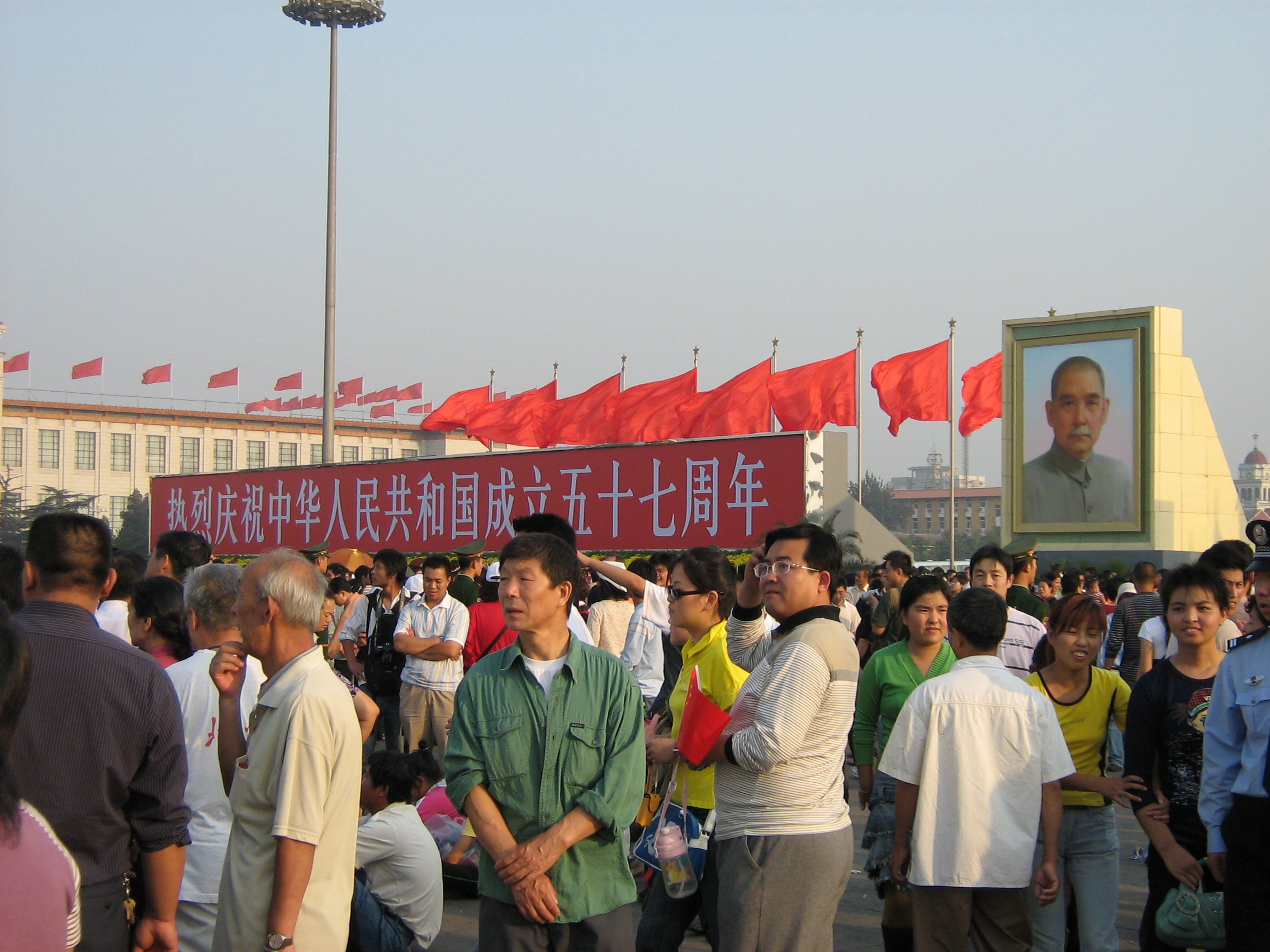
Revellers gather in front of a lone portrait of Chinese Nationalist Sun Yat-sen in Tiananmen Square on the National Day of the People's Republic of China in 2006.

Patriotic Education focused prominently upon Chinese history and traditional culture. A story of Chinese national development characterised by an unceasing striving for self-improvement and struggle against foreign aggression was promoted as the CCP sought to transform the ideological basis of its rule's legitimacy from Communism to Patriotism. The patriotic education campaign broke from Marxist tradition; fostering revivals in Confucianism and Chinese traditional cultural activities, celebrating symbols of Chinese national unity and achievement like the Yellow Emperor and the Great Wall, and replacing portraits of Marx and Engels in Tiananmen Square on national day celebrations with a lone portrait of non-Communist, Chinese Nationalist Sun Yat-sen.

This theme of the patriotic education campaign was designed to portray the CPP's patriotism throughout China's long struggle for national independence and prosperity, rather than its Communist ideals, as the basis for its political legitimacy.

=== Territorial integrity and national unity ===
The patriotic education campaign also emphasised the theme of territorial integrity and national unity, as the CCP sought to foster nationalist resentment towards foreign pressures. The campaign therefore emphasised China's foreign relations and sought to highlight numerous examples of hostile foreign interference in China's domestic affairs. The international condemnation of the crack-down on the 1989 prodemocracy movement, for instance, was presented as a calculated attempt to change China's political system, and the demands of Hong Kong residents for more democracy were conveyed as an international effort to turn the region into an anti-China base.

Through the patriotic education campaign, the CCP presented itself as the strong national leadership base preventing the nation's collapse at the hand of corrupting international forces.

== Evolution ==
The campaign was aimed at Chinese youth and had them study China's humiliating modern history - such as China's "century of humiliation" - and the positive changes brought by the Communist Revolution. These included a replacement of the old class-struggle narrative with a new patriotic narrative, as well as a replacement of the official Maoist "victor narrative" in which China "won" national independence with a "victimisation narrative" that blames the West for China's problems and suffering.

Specific changes in the content of Chinese history textbooks can be seen at three different instances in time. In 1995, Chinese textbooks followed a Marxist, historical materialist, and internationalist ideology. Japan was seen mostly in a positive light with highlights on its positive impact on China through its own modernisation. Negative aspects of Japan, such as the rise of fascism, are attributed to the elite and government and not the people. In history education, the patriotic education campaign highlighted Japanese atrocities against China during the Second Sino-Japanese War. In 2004, textbooks took on a more liberal and cosmopolitan ideology. Japan was still only marginally discussed with the only real mention of its influence on China coming from Japan's role in smuggling opium into China.

In 2007, however, textbooks became more nation-centric and Japan's history and aggression against China were now covered much more explicitly. Furthermore, while Japan's achievements are still noted, there is no longer mention of any positive impact on China. There is also no longer a distinction between the elite and the masses, meaning Japan's wartime atrocities are now being blamed on the Japanese people rather than the government or elite. Overall, Chinese textbooks were portraying a much more negative view of Japan. The new content brought forth by this campaign has become embedded in political institutions and inaugurated as the CCP's new ideological tool.

The Standing Committee of the National People's Congress (NPCSC) passed the Patriotic Education Law on 24 October 2023 to further strengthen patriotic education The law came into effect on 1 January 2024.

== Effectiveness and results ==
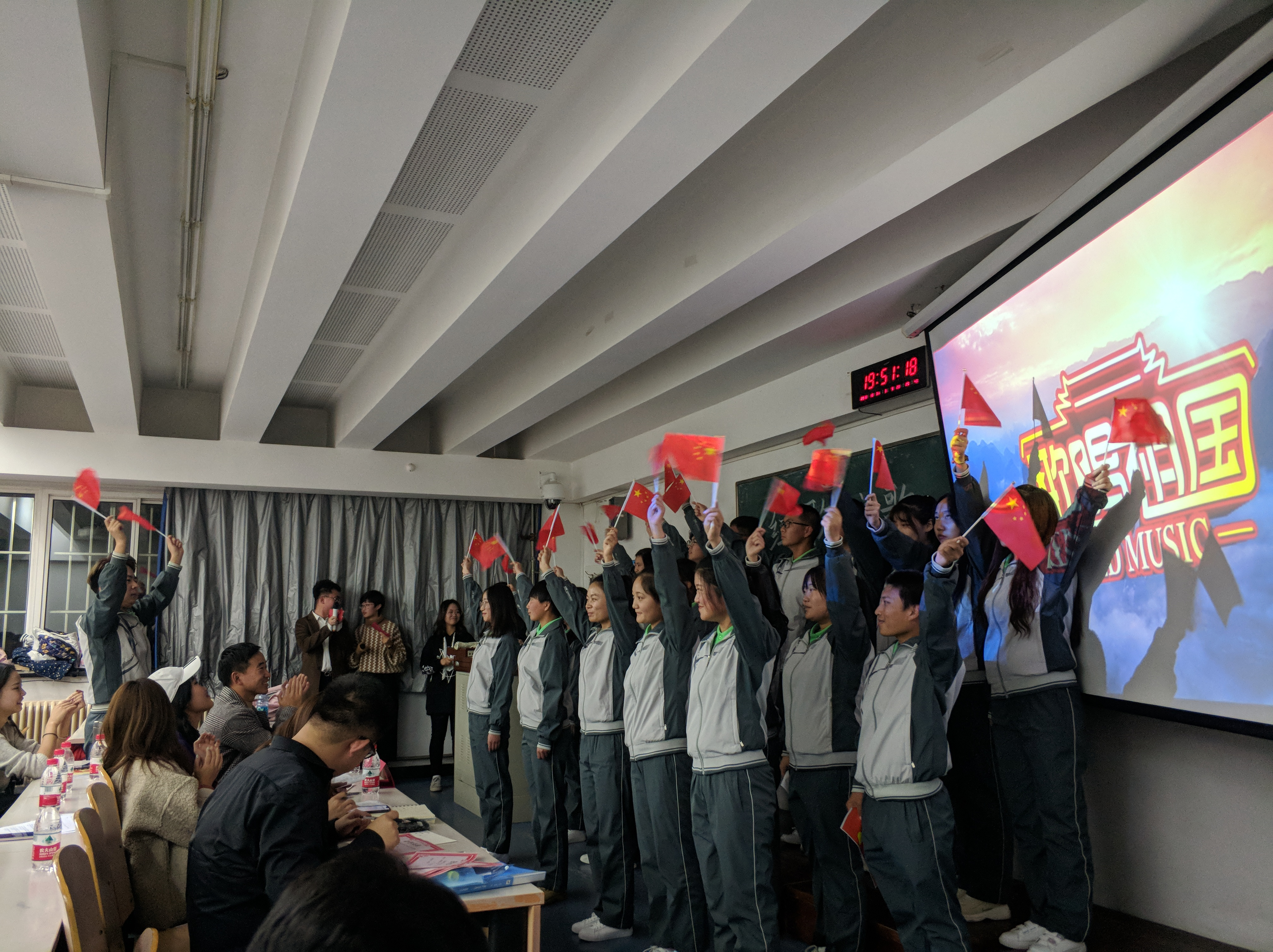
Students at Dalian University perform "Ode to the Motherland" in a 2018 competition designed to promote Patriotic Education.

The patriotic education campaign is generally thought, by both Chinese and foreign commentators, to have been highly successful in fostering a strong sense of Chinese Nationalism amongst the Chinese populace throughout the 1990s and into the 21st century and is credited with having engineered the modern view of the CCP's popular legitimacy. Chinese and foreign commentators also consider it to have been instrumental in constructing the Chinese domestic vision of the country as a "unified" national collectivity.

Compared to previous educational campaigns launched by the CCP, particularly those in Maoist years, the patriotic education campaign of the 1990s was implemented with greater pragmatism and sophistication. The campaign was not typified by radical, yet relatively empty proclamations of dedication to the socialist cause, but instead employed symbols of general Chinese patriotism in a manner which successfully tied popular visions of the position of the Chinese nation to that of the Communist Party itself, such that criticisms of the party came to be viewed as unpatriotic.

During the Maoist years, Chinese education campaigns had largely failed to build support for the government and were often considered to be without substance. If anything, they cultivated deep suspicion of government intentions and numbed the Chinese populace to the meaning of CCP messaging. Conversely, the patriotic education campaign employed a more multifaceted approach to public communication; employing figures, statistics and stories in order to lend credence to the campaign. This, along with the PEC's coincidence with the reform and opening up and rapid economic growth (portrayed as the fruits of effective CCP governance), lent the patriotic education campaign success the CCP's former campaigns had not known.

Today, younger generations of Chinese students and academics are seen as less likely to oppose the government's foreign policy belief that China's global position is being stymied by foreign pressures. Such widespread support for the Communist Party, or at least unwillingness to criticise its actions, is considered evidence that the patriotic education campaign has served its purpose.

Higher levels of youth support for CCP governance, however, are only the most superficial indicator the PEC's success. Chinese youth today have also been found to be more likely than their 1990s counterparts to report that being Chinese is a core aspect of their personal identity, and more likely to have a negative opinion of other countries such as the US and Japan.

The campaign, particularly the Patriotic Education Sites, contributed to the development of Red Tourism. The campaign also contributed to a boom in the development of museums in China.

== Competing international visions of the campaign ==
International historiographical thought tends to posit the patriotic education campaign as the most recent attempt of the CCP's to inculcate the Chinese populace with a belief in the party's supremacy. Viewed as a propaganda campaign, most non-Chinese commentators are critical of the campaign's indoctrinatory effect and have deemed it a tool employed by an authoritarian government in order to shore up support for its totalitarian and anti-democratic agenda.

Others, particularly Chinese commentators, have defended the campaign, arguing that it does not seek to rewrite Chinese history in the manner that its critics have suggested, but that it merely reflects the historical realities of Chinese maltreatment at the hands of foreign powers and CCP operation to end Chinese humiliation. Such commentators have further argued that the patriotic education campaign has only sought to foster an existing sense of Chinese nationalism and pride in national government, rather than coercively seeking to centre the position of the Communist Party in the public conception of national identity and thereby silence political dissent.

== Gallery ==
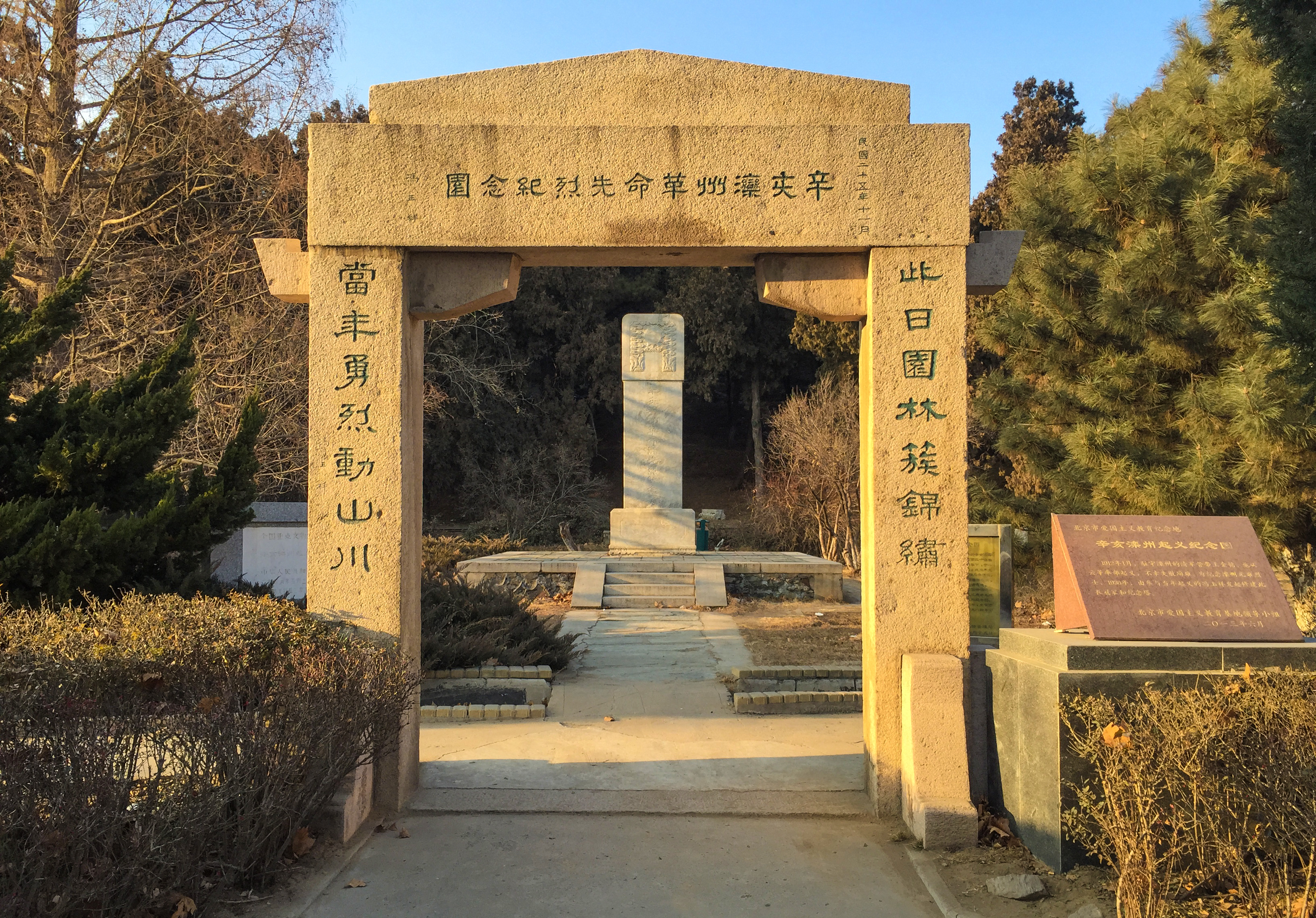
Memorial Park to the Martyrs of the 1911 Xinhai Revolution; a Patriotic Education Site located in Beijing's Haidian District.

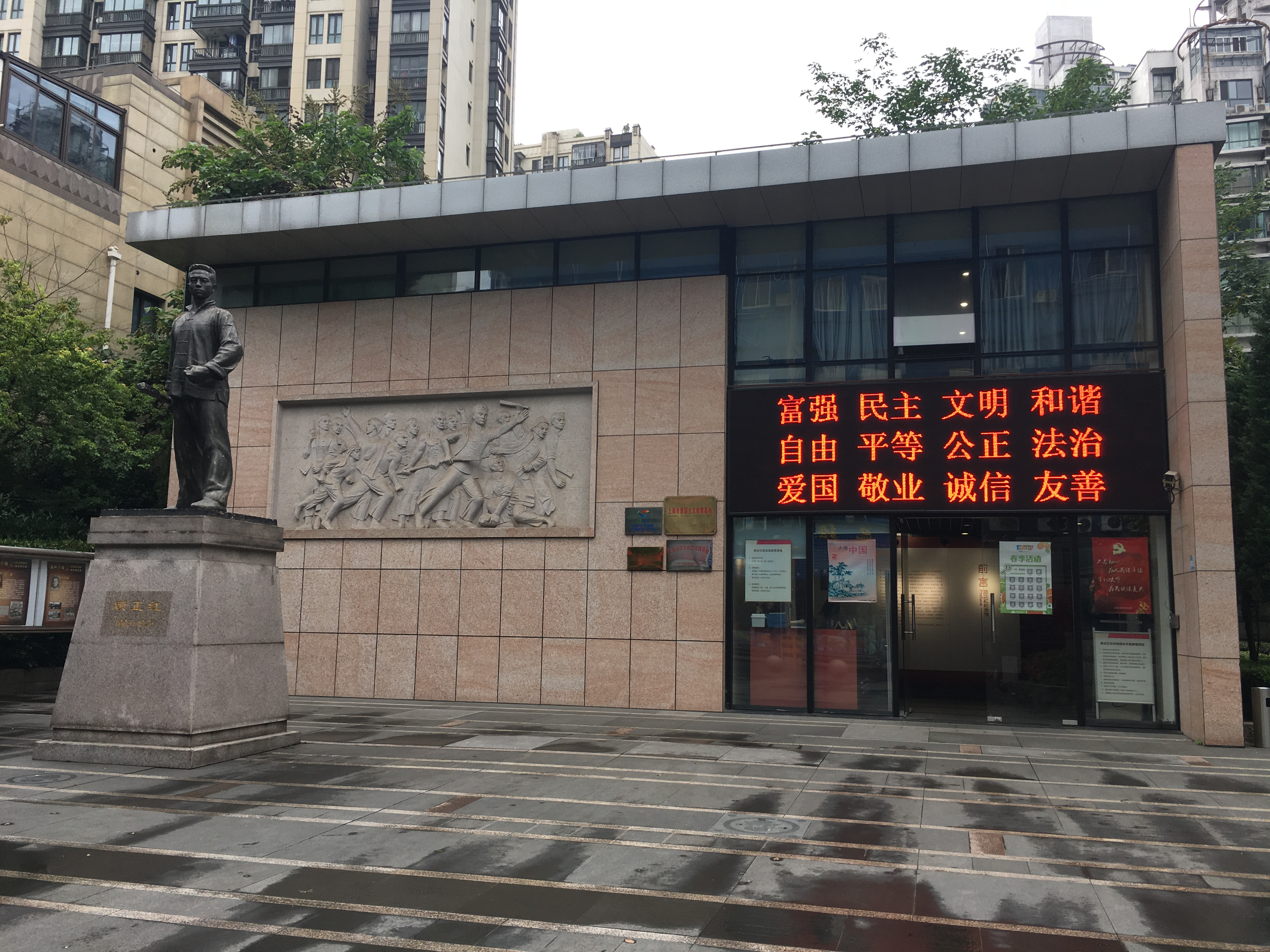
Gu Zhenghong Memorial Hall; a Patriotic Education Site located in Shanghai's Putuo District.

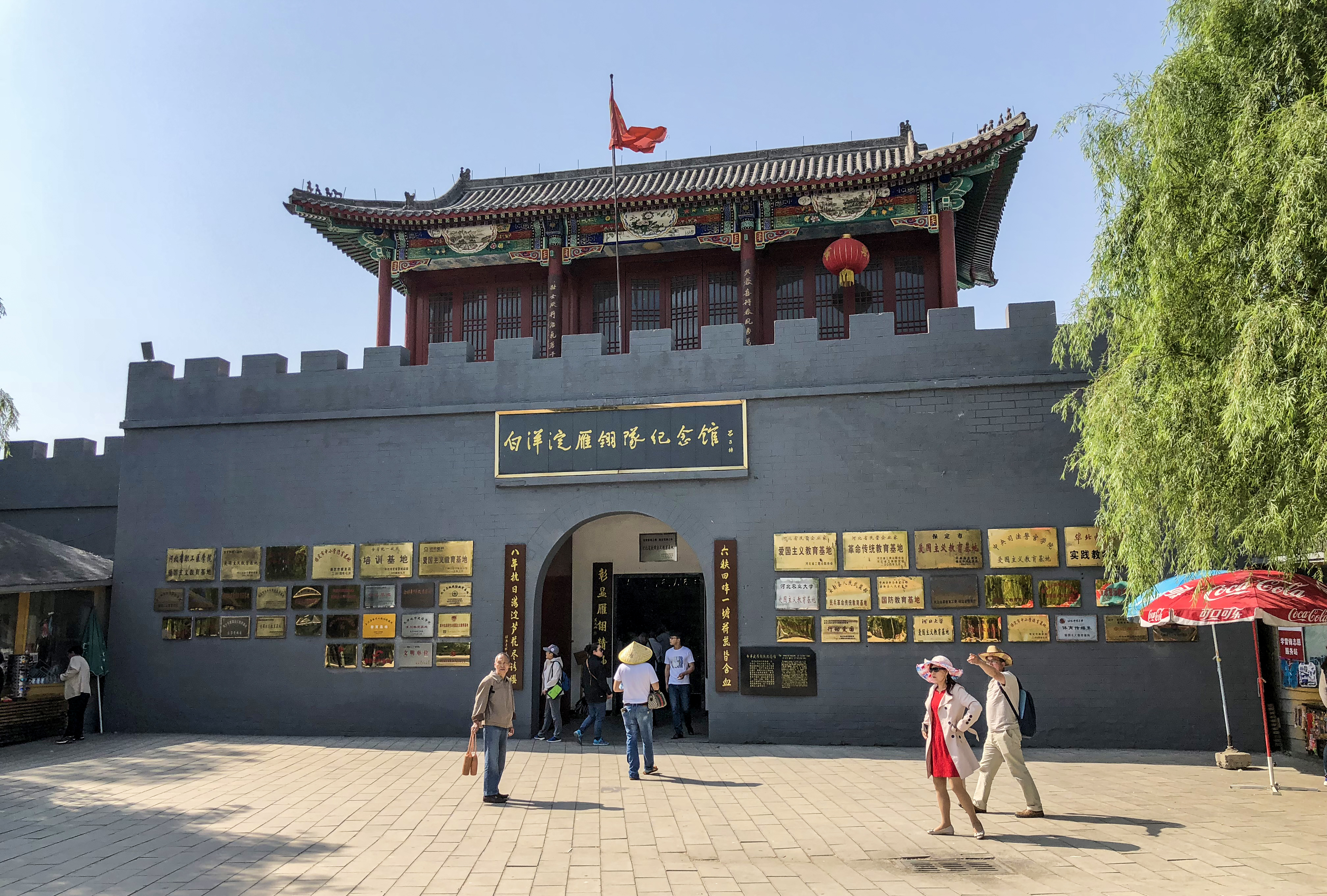
Yanling Team Memorial Museum; a Patriotic Education Site located on Baiyang Lake, east of Baoding, Hebei.

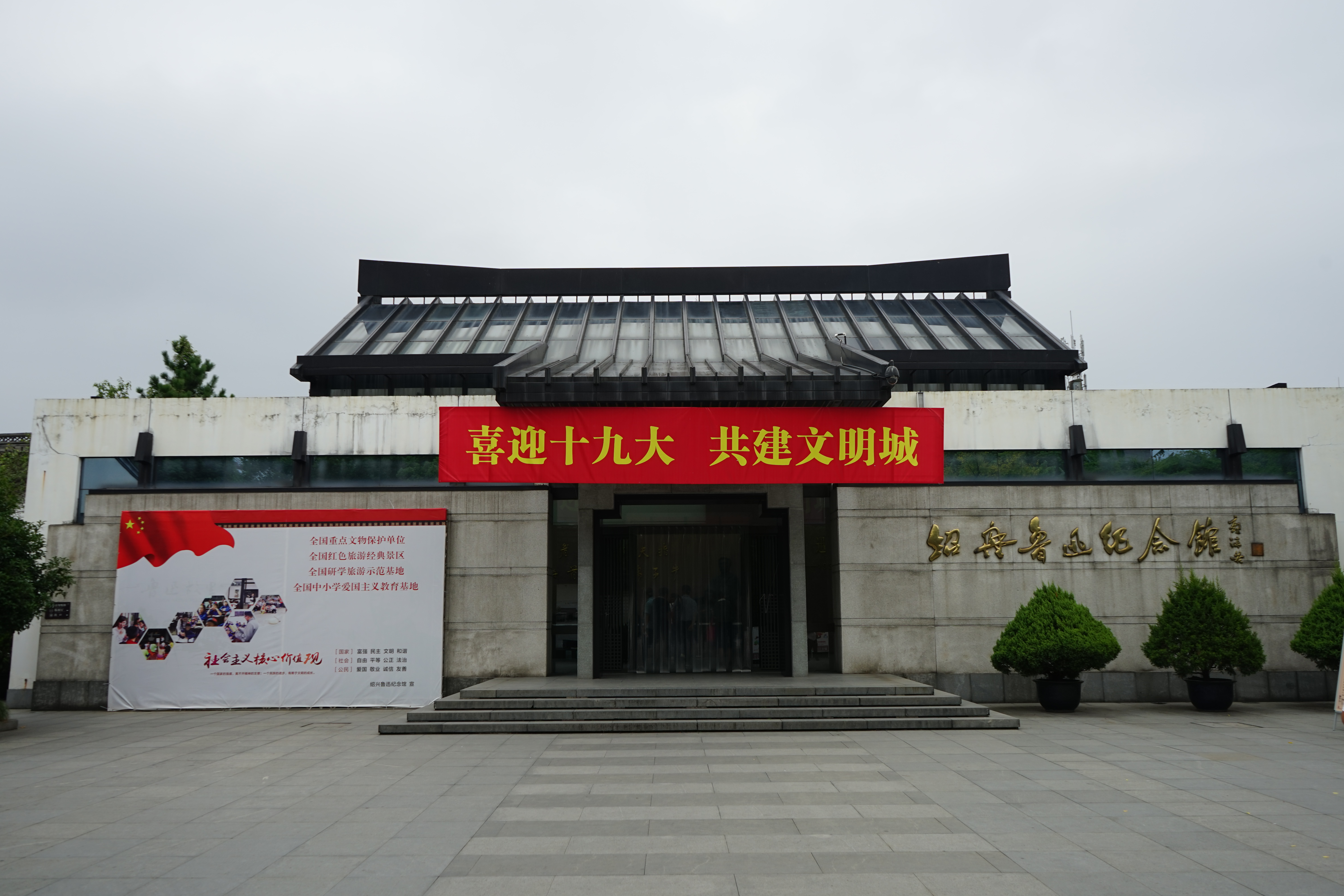
Shaoxing Lu Xun Memorial Museum; a Patriotic Education Site located in Shaoxing, Zhejiang.

== See also ==
- Ideology of the Chinese Communist Party
- Xuexi Qiangguo – a similar initiative for Xi Jinping Thought
- Conversations about Important Things – the Russian equivalent
