= Patriotic Education Law of the People's Republic of China =

Law of China

Standing Committee of the National People's Congress
- Passed by: Standing Committee of the National People's Congress
- Passed: 24 October 2023
- Signed by: President Xi Jinping
- Signed: 24 October 2023
- Commenced: 1 January 2024

Legislative history
- Introduced by: Council of Chairpersons
- First reading: 26–28 June 2023
- Second reading: 20–24 October 2023
- Status: In force

Patriotic Education Law of the People's Republic of China
- Simplified Chinese: 中华人民共和国爱国主义教育法
- Traditional Chinese: 中華人民共和國愛國主義教育法
Transcriptions
Standard Mandarin
- Hanyu Pinyin: Zhōnghuá Rénmín Gònghéguó Àiguózhǔyì Jiàoyù fǎ

The Patriotic Education Law of the People's Republic of China is a legislation concerning mandatory patriotic education in the country. It was passed by the Standing Committee of the National People's Congress on 24 October 2023 and came into effect on 1 January 2024.

== Legislative history ==
The draft law was submitted for review on 26 June 2023. The Patriotic Education Law was passed by the Standing Committee of the National People's Congress (NPCSC) on 24 October 2023, and was signed by Xi Jinping in his capacity as president in the same day. It came into effect on 1 January 2024.

== Provisions ==
According to the law, the main contents of patriotism are:

1. Marxism–Leninism, Mao Zedong Thought, Deng Xiaoping Theory, the Three Represents, the Scientific Outlook on Development, and Xi Jinping Thought on Socialism with Chinese Characteristics for a New Era;
2. the history of the Chinese Communist Party, the history of the People's Republic of China, the history of reform and opening up, the history of the development of socialism, and the history of the development of the Chinese nation;
3. the system of socialism with Chinese characteristics, and the "great achievements, historical experience and vivid practice of the Chinese Communist Party leading the people in united struggle";
4. "China's excellent traditional culture, revolutionary culture, and advanced socialist culture";
5. national symbols and emblems such as the national flag, national anthem and national emblem
6. the "magnificent mountains and rivers and historical and cultural heritage of the motherland";
7. awareness of concepts regarding the Constitution and laws, national unity and ethnic solidarity, national security and national defense;
8. "deeds of heroes, martyrs and advanced model figures and the national spirit and contemporary spirit they embody".

The law requires that "all levels and types of school shall have patriotic education permeate the entire course of school education, doing a good job of ideology and political theory courses, and having patriotic education integrated into all subjects". It requires establishments such as museums and libraries to be turned into places to venues to conduct patriotic education and to turn tourist locatıons into places which "inspire patriotism".

Article 15 emphasizes the integration of patriotic education to "all levels and types of school" and "the entire course of school education". Article 16 mentions "all types of school activity", including mandating schools to organize trips for students to visit patriotic sites. Article 17 mandates parents and guardians to take on the responsibility of patriotic education of their children at home. Article 22 mandates that the law applies to the residents of Hong Kong, Macau and Taiwan, and overseas Chinese, with the intention of "consciously preserving national and ethnic unity". Article 33 requires internet information service providers to produce content that "embodies the spirit of patriotism" and develop "new technologies and products to vividly carry out patriotic education activities".

== See also ==
- Historical nihilism
- Patriotic education in China
