= Reactions to the 1989 Tiananmen Square protests and massacre =

Domestic and international reactions to crackdown on the Tiananmen Square protests

International reactions to the 1989 Tiananmen Square massacre Countries that condemned the Chinese government’s response Countries that maintained a neutral stance or called it China's internal affairs Countries that supported the Chinese government’s response Unknown China

The 1989 Tiananmen Square protests and massacre were the first of their type shown in detail on Western television. The Chinese government's response was denounced, particularly by Western governments and media. Criticism came from both Western and Eastern Europe, North America, Australia and some east Asian and Latin American countries. Notably, many Asian countries remained silent throughout the protests; the government of India responded to the massacre by ordering the state television to pare down the coverage to the barest minimum, so as not to jeopardize a thawing in relations with China, and to offer political empathy for the events. North Korea, Cuba, Czechoslovakia, and East Germany, as well as many countries in Africa and Asia, supported the Chinese government and denounced the protests. Overseas Chinese students demonstrated in many cities in Europe, America, the Middle East, and Asia against the Chinese government.

== National reaction ==
Some Chinese citizens deplored the massacre of peaceful protesters and believed that it had been done with such brutal force to prevent any further protests by citizens. In the immediate aftermath of the Tiananmen Square protests, the Chinese Communist Party (CCP) maintained its original condemnation of the student demonstrations (see April 26 Editorial) and characterized the crackdown as necessary to maintain stability. Government sources downplayed the violence against demonstrators on 3 and 4 June, and portrayed the public as supportive of the crackdown. In the days after the protest, the CCP attempted to control access to information on the massacre, confiscating film from foreign journalists. Domestic journalists who had been sympathetic to the student movement were removed from their positions, and several foreign journalists were expelled from China. On June 6, State Council spokesman Yuan Mu held a press conference where he claimed that there had been 300 fatalities during the massacre, with no killings having occurred in Tiananmen Square itself. Yuan Mu portrayed the crackdown as a response to "a counterrevolutionary rebellion in the early hours of the morning of June 3." In August 1989, the Chinese government released its complete, official account of the Tiananmen protests, The Truth About the Beijing Turmoil. The narrative presented in The Truth About the Beijing Turmoil differs significantly from the accounts of student leaders and foreign journalists, many of which are banned in China. On the origins of the protest the book states:

"This turmoil was not a chance occurrence. It was a political turmoil incited by a very small number of political careerists after a few years of plotting and scheming. It was aimed at subverting the socialist People's Republic."

This contradicts the statements of student leaders, who emphasized the spontaneous nature of their decisions to join the protest and their desire to work within the political system. On the 4 June crackdown and its aftermath The Truth About the Beijing Turmoil recounts:

"The measures adopted by the Chinese government to stop the turmoil and put down the rebellion have not only won the acclaim and support of the Chinese people, but they have also won the understanding and support of the governments and peoples of many other countries. The Chinese government has announced that it will unswervingly carry on the policy of reform and opening to the outside world…"

Due to the ongoing censorship in China, it is difficult to verify the claim that the government crackdown had popular support. In the book The People's Republic of Amnesia: Tiananmen Revisited, Chen Guang, a soldier who participated in the 4 June crackdown, describes the attitudes of citizens following the protests, "The residents suddenly changed to become really nice to the soldiers. I thought about this a lot at the time. It really confused me. Why was it like that? On June 4th, all the residents supported the students. So overnight how did they come to support the soldiers?"

In the weeks after the crackdown, Chinese state news focused largely on the aggression of protesters and their killing of PLA soldiers. Footage of Liu Guogeng, who was beaten to death by protesters before being immolated, and his grieving family was shown repeatedly in government television broadcasts during June 1989. State media showed mourners laying wreaths and flowers at the site where Liu was killed. The families of demonstrators and bystanders who were killed during the protest have in some cases been forbidden from engaging in public mourning.

In a private conversation with East German Politburo member Günter Schabowski shortly after the massacre, Jiang Zemin denied the massacre, but admitted that the square was cleared militarily and that in the ensuing clashes, around 400 people died. According to Schabowski, Zemin did not denigrate the students, avoiding terms like "counter-revolution" or "foreign interference", and seemed uncomfortable with the topic, which he interpreted as stemming from feelings of guilt.

In the decades since the Tiananmen Square protests the CCP has attempted to prevent any remembrance of the protest movement and the subsequent crackdown. While the government initially tried to justify its suppression of the protest, releasing official statements and creating museum exhibits on the events of 3–5 June, it now denies that such suppression ever occurred. In 2011, an opinion piece, "Tiananmen Square a Myth", was published in China Daily, the CCP's English-language newspaper. The article claims that, "When eventually troops were sent in to clear the [Tiananmen] square, the demonstrations were already ending. But by this time the Western media were there in force, keen to grab any story they could." There is no mention of a counterrevolutionary rebellion, as earlier government accounts refer to. As Louisa Lim notes in her book, The People's Republic of Amnesia: Tiananmen Revisited, many young Chinese know almost nothing of the Tiananmen Square protests. In an informal survey, Lim showed the iconic photo of Tank Man to 100 Chinese university students; only 15 correctly identified it as being an image of Tiananmen Square. Perry Link, a Chinese language and literature scholar, writes, "The story of the massacre is banned from textbooks, the media, and all other public contexts." In 2014, Gu Yimin, a Chinese activist, was sentenced to 18 months in prison for attempting to hold a march on the anniversary of the Tiananmen Square crackdown. After filing a request to hold the march in 2013, he was charged with "inciting subversion of state power." Activist groups such as the Tiananmen Mothers have faced intense government surveillance for their attempts to hold the CCP accountable for the losses of their family members.

Currently, the Chinese government blocks all website based searches in China with any regard to the massacre at Tiananmen Square. Due to the extensive censorship around the events, most young people in China are unaware of the Tiananmen Square protests and massacre. According to academic Margaret Roberts, inadvertent disclosures of the Tiananmen Square massacre often happen in China "when political information and entertainment are paired," which are harder to censor.

=== Deng Xiaoping ===
In 1992, during Deng Xiaoping's southern tour, Deng credited the reform and opening up with preventing destabilization of the regime following the Tiananmen Square massacre. Deng stated:

"Had it not been for the achievements of the reform and the open policy, we could have not weathered June 4th. And if we had failed the test, there would have been chaos and civil war ... Why was it that our country could remain stable after the June 4th Incident? It was precisely because we had carried out the reform and the open policy."

== Organizations ==
United Nations
Secretary-General Javier Pérez de Cuéllar was concerned at the massacre, adding that the government should uphold the utmost restraint, but also noted that the UN Charter prohibits interference in member states' internal affairs (especially member states with a Security Council veto).

From August 7 to September 1, 1989, the Sub-Commission on Prevention of Discrimination and Protection of Minorities (a part of the Commission on Human Rights) met in Geneva for its thirty-seventh meeting. This meeting was the first time since the killings in June "that a human rights meeting ha[d] begun discussing the subject." At the meeting resolution 1989/5 was adopted by secret ballot on 31 August 1989. The resolution, also called "Situation in China" states the committee was concerned about what had occurred in China and the implications the crackdown would have on the future of human rights. The resolution has two points:

1. Requests the Secretary-General to transmit to the Commission on Human Rights information provided by the Government of China and by other reliable sources;
2. Makes an appeal for clemency, in particular in favour of persons deprived of their liberty as a result of the above-mentioned events.

On 1 December 1989 the permanent representative of People's Republic of China (PRC) to the United Nations Ambassador Li Luye replied to the Sub-Commission's adoption of resolution 1989/5 by stating that it was "a brutal interference in China's internal affairs." Li also stated that the "Spokesman of the Foreign Ministry of the People's Republic of China issued a statement on 2 September 1989, solemnly declaring the firm objection of the Chinese Government to the resolution and deeming it to be illegal and null and void."

At the forty-sixth session of the Commission on Human Rights in January 1990 Li distributed a letter as a document for the meeting. In the letter Li reaffirms the position of the Chinese Government toward the resolution and that "actions to put an end to the turmoil and quell the rebellion were justified and legitimate." He also states that the punishment of "criminals" who have "violated the criminal law" is justified and that a small number of Western nations are using the United Nations to interfere internal affairs, which is a clear and complete violation of the UN Charter and international relations.

The forty-sixth session found the Chinese claim of interference in internal affairs indefensible and that "massive violation" of human rights concerned of the international community. It also stated that China had accepted voluntarily the obligations of upholding the human rights of its citizens. When accepted into the United Nations in 1971, China was "bound by established human rights standards which are part of the customary law or which have been accepted by the international community."

European Economic Community
The European Economic Community condemned the government response and cancelled all high level contacts and loans. They planned a resolution at the UNHCR criticising China's human rights record. The EU maintains an arms embargo against China to this day.

== Countries ==
=== Africa ===
- Angola: On 6 August, Angolan Foreign Minister Afonso Van-Dúnem expressed his understanding and support for the Chinese government's "decisive measures to quell the counter-revolutionary riots".
- Botswana: On 21 June, President Quett Masire said, “I deeply sympathize with the pressure your government and people have endured in the previous period, and I am pleased with the final resolution of the problem and the restoration of stability.” He also stated that as a brother country of the Third World, Botswana will do its best to share China's burdens. He continued by saying that Third World countries have all experienced difficult times, so it is natural for them to express sympathy and understanding for China. He expressed his appreciation for the Chinese government's policies, its determination not to back down in the face of setbacks, and its efforts to pursue progress and reform. Vice President Peter Mmusi said that he was pleased to see that the Chinese government had turned the tide and that China would certainly continue to move towards its established goals.
- Burkina Faso: On 6 September, President Blaise Compaoré spoke highly of the existing friendly and cooperative relations between Burkina Faso and China and expressed his satisfaction with the Chinese government's "quelling of the counter-revolutionary riots in Beijing and its swift control of the situation in the capital". On 7 September, Compaoré said that "quelling the riots" was "entirely China's internal affair.
- Comoros: On 25 August, Comorian President Ahmed Abdallah said that China is a sovereign country and that what happens in China is China's internal affair, which foreign countries have no right to interfere with.
- Egypt: On 27 June, Deputy Prime Minister and Foreign Minister Ahmed Asmat Abdel-Meguid said “The latest developments in the situation in China are China’s internal affairs. Egypt attaches importance to its relations with China and fully believes that the Chinese government will solve the problems it is currently facing and continue to achieve economic and social development.” When President Hosni Mubarak met with Foreign Minister Qian Qichen in September, he expressed his pleasure at China's stable political and economic development, gave it high praise, and invited President Yang Shangkun to visit Egypt before the end of the year. Yousef Wali, Secretary General of the ruling National Democratic Party and Deputy Prime Minister, said that Egypt "understands and supports the actions taken by the Chinese Communist Party and the Chinese government in dealing with their internal affairs recently". On 18 September, Abdel-Meguid said that it is "unacceptable for some Western countries to interfere in China’s internal affairs. Egypt understands what is happening in China. Egypt does not interfere in China’s internal affairs, does not take measures that would harm the relations between the two countries or cause misunderstandings, and fully believes that the Chinese leaders have the wisdom and ability to solve their own problems." He expressed his understanding of China's "suppression of the counter-revolutionary riots and said that no country would allow or accept itself to be in a state of chaos". Abdel-Meguid also stated that it is unacceptable for certain Western countries to interfere in China's internal affairs; instead of seeking the truth, they are trying to harm China on a flawed basis.
- Gabon: On 20 June, President Omar Bongo said that everything happening in China was "China's internal affair" and expressed his hope that the existing friendly relations between Gabon and China would continue to develop.
- Ghana: Radio Ghana said on 22 June the strong reaction of the Western world to this incident was “proof of a long-planned scheme by counter-revolutionaries and foreign forces to destabilize China”, and that the intervention of the Western world could not force a legitimate government to succumb to an unbelievable chaotic situation. On 7 July, Don Arthur, chairman of the Ghana National Economic Cooperation Council, said that Ghana "fully sympathized with and understood the just actions taken by the Chinese government in response to the recent counter-revolutionary riots in Beijing". He said that the Ghanaian government and people have "long been vigilant against the conspiracies of certain Western countries to undermine the stability and security of other countries". On 8 August, Jerry Rawlings, chairman of the Provisional National Defence Council, said when talking about the situation in China that “We are glad that the Chinese government has taken action to restore normal order and hope that the Chinese people will not be influenced by the outside world and will follow their own path.” On 10 October, Paul Victor Obeng, Chairman of the Committee of Secretaries, said that Ghana has "always attached importance to China’s reforms. We are deeply disappointed when some people in China carry out counter-revolutionary activities under the so-called slogans of “democracy” and “freedom”. But we have always believed that the Chinese leaders and the Chinese government are able to control the situation. And now, based on our observations, that is indeed the case".
- Kenya: On 22 June, President Daniel arap Moi said that Kenya hopes to see China stabilize so that the Chinese government can focus on developing the national economy, and expressed support for the Chinese government and hopes that China will continue to implement its reform and opening-up policies to the outside world.
- Libya: On 4 September, Libya's second-in-command, Abdessalam Jalloud, said that Libyans were "pleased with China's quelling of the counter-revolutionary riots in June". He said that Third World countries were pleased with China's refusal to yield to imperialists and its continued adherence to the path it had chosen. Jalloud said that the Chinese revolution had set an example for the people of the world. He hoped that cooperation between Libya and China would develop more quickly and better.
- Madagascar: On 2 October, Madagascar President Didier Ratsiraka said he supported the Chinese government's "decisive measures to quell the counter-revolutionary riots and opposed interference in China’s internal affairs by some countries". He said that no government in the world could tolerate a small group of rioters creating unrest in its capital for two months aimed at overthrowing the government. He continued by saying "Some Western powers have rudely interfered in China’s internal affairs and imposed economic sanctions during this process, which is a sign of irrationality." He stressed that China's affairs should be resolved by the Chinese government and should not be interfered with by other countries.
- Mali: Malian news media have not broadcast any reports on massacre that are unfavorable to the Chinese government. At some international conferences on the massacre, Malian representatives supported the Chinese government.
- Mauritania: On 17 June, Ndiaye Kane, a member of the Military Committee for National Salvation and Minister of Health and Social Affairs, said that Mauritania was pleased that the Chinese government had "quelled a counter-revolutionary riot" and hoped that the political situation in China would stabilize. He also said that his country would stand with China and support the Chinese government. On 24 June, Minister of Foreign Affairs and Cooperation Mohamed Sidina Ould Sidiya said that he believed the Chinese government could control the situation and hoped that calm would be restored as soon as possible. He also said that other countries should not interfere in China's internal affairs. On 24 July, Mauritanian leader Maaouya Ould Sid'Ahmed Taya said that he was pleased that the Chinese government had controlled the situation and that everything had returned to normal and calm. On 8 August, the newly appointed Mauritanian Minister of Foreign Affairs and Cooperation, Sheikh Siddi Ahmed Ould Baba, said that the Mauritanian government fully supported all measures taken by the Chinese government to quell the riot when talking about China's "recent quelling of the counter-revolutionary riot in Beijing".
- Mozambique: On 9 August, Mozambican Foreign Minister Pascoal Mocumbi expressed his understanding of "China's suppression of the counter-revolutionary riots and his indignation at Western countries' interference in China's internal affairs".
- Nigeria: On 11 October, Nigerian Army Chief of Staff Lieutenant General Sani Abacha said that Nigeria was pleased to see that the Chinese government had successfully quelled the unrest involving foreign interference.
- People's Republic of the Congo: On 12 September, Paul Ngatse, Secretary of the Secretariat of the Central and Minister of Information, highly praised the Chinese government for "quelling the counter-revolutionary riots that occurred in Beijing".
- Rwanda: On 19 October, Rwandan President Juvénal Habyarimana said that the Chinese government's "suppression of the counter-revolutionary riots in Beijing" was an internal affair of China, and no other country should impose its will on the Chinese government.
- São Tomé and Príncipe: On 29 June, Foreign Minister Carlos Graça said that his visit to China was to express São Tomé and Príncipe's determination to strengthen friendly relations with China; to express its belief that the Chinese Party, government and people have the right and ability to solve their own problems; and to express its support for China's reform and opening up and its independent foreign policy.
- Senegal: On 25 July, Abdelaziz Ndaouf, Speaker of the National Assembly of Senegal, said that any country's problems should be solved by itself, and Senegal would never interfere in the internal affairs of other countries.
- Sierra Leone: On 10 October, Sierra Leone's Presidential Envoy and Second Vice President Salia Jusu-Sheriff said that China's handling of the counter-revolutionary riots in Beijing was China's internal affair, and that the Chinese government and people knew how to handle the matter. He said that there should be no interference in China's internal affairs.
- Somalia: On 21 August, Haki Mohammed, deputy secretary-general of the Revolutionary Socialist Party of Somalia, said that the Chinese government's suppression of the riots was both timely and effective. He congratulated the Chinese government on its victory.
- Sudan: On 12 September, Lieutenant General Omar al-Bashir, Chairman of the Sudanese Revolutionary Command Council and Prime Minister, expressed satisfaction with the Chinese government's suppression of the "counter-revolutionary riots".
- Tanzania: On 22 June, Tanzania's First Vice President and Prime Minister Joseph Sinde Warioba said that the Tanzanian party and government have been closely monitoring the recent developments in China, support China's choice of its own path, and hope that China will soon achieve stability. On 11 September Tanzania's Second Vice President and President of Zanzibar Idris Abdul Wakil said that Tanzania supports China in quelling the "counter-revolutionary riots" and opposes interference in the internal affairs of certain Western countries.
- Togo: On 24 July, Togolese President Gnassingbé Eyadéma said that the recent events in the Chinese capital were China's internal affairs and that no country should interfere in them according to the UN Charter. He emphasized that non-interference in the internal affairs of other countries is a universal principle and hoped that the situation in China would remain stable. On 4 August, Eyadéma said that the measures taken by the Chinese government to "quell the riots in Beijing" in early June were something that a sovereign state must do in its internal affairs. He said that any country has the right to take necessary measures when faced with such events, and that no foreign country has the right to interfere in the internal affairs of other countries according to the UN Charter.
- Tunisia: On 24 September, Tunisian Foreign Minister Abdelhamid Escheikh expressed his understanding of the events that occurred in Beijing, the capital of China, in June this year, believing that it was entirely China's internal affair and that foreign countries should not interfere.
- Zaire: On 14 June, Maitre Nimy Mayidika Ngimbi, Vice Prime Minister in charge of politics, administration and society, said that the Zaire government sympathized with the Chinese government in "suppressing the recent counter-revolutionary riots in Beijing" and that the Zaire government stood with the Chinese government. On 21 September, President Mobutu Sese Seko said that he supported China in "suppressing the counter-revolutionary riots". He summarized his attitude toward China's suppression of the riots into three points: “sympathy, understanding and non-interference in internal affairs.” On 22 October, Gombumbo Fum wa Utadi, Executive Secretary of the Central Committee for Foreign Relations, conveyed Mobutu's warm congratulations to Jiang Zemin on his appointment as General Secretary of Chinese Communist Party and his support for China's suppression of the protests, and highly praised the great achievements made by the People's Republic of China in the 40 years since its founding.
- Zimbabwe: On 3 July, the ruling ZANU–PF political bureau member and foreign minister Nathan Shamuyarira said that the Zimbabwean party and government were pleased with the stable situation after China "quelled the counter-revolutionary riots". He said that Zimbabwe respects China's independence and sovereignty and that the Chinese people have the right to choose the path and policies they believe are correct. On 3 August, Zimbabwean President Robert Mugabe said that Zimbabwe supports the measures taken by China to "quell the counter-revolutionary riots". On 3 August, acting foreign minister Mangwandi said that Zimbabwe fully understands China's position against foreign interference in its internal affairs. On 4 August, Parliament Speaker Didymus Mutasa said that he opposed including China's domestic issues as a supplementary agenda item for the 82nd Inter-Parliamentary Union meeting to be held in September. He said that the meeting had no right to discuss the internal affairs of a country.

=== Asia ===
- Bangladesh: President Hussain Muhammad Ershad said that Bangladesh has been watching the developments in China closely. He said that the recent events in China are "purely China’s internal affairs" and should not be interfered with by foreign powers. He expressed his appreciation for China's "end to the turmoil and rapid resumption of normal production", and said that Bangladesh will always be a friend of China and hopes that the friendly and cooperative relations between the two countries will continue to develop. On 23 August, Foreign Minister Anisul Islam Mahmud said that he was pleased to see the situation in China return to normal and stable, and believed that under the leadership of the current leaders of China, China will move further towards prosperity and the friendship between Bangladesh and China will be further developed.
- Burma: The government supported the actions of the Chinese government. On 13 June, Khin Nyunt, the secretary of the State Law and Order Restoration Council, on behalf of the committee's chairman Saw Maung, expressed understanding and sympathy for the Chinese government's stance in "suppressing the counter-revolutionary riots". Opposition leader Aung San Suu Kyi condemned them, saying: "We deplore it. It happened in Burma and we wanted the world to stand by Burma, so we stand by the Chinese students."
- Hong Kong: The military action severely affected perceptions of China. 200,000 people protested against the Chinese government's response, with the latter considering the protests as "subversive". The people of Hong Kong hoped that the chaos on China would destabilize the Beijing Government and thus avert its reunification with the rest of China. The Sino-British Joint Declaration was also called into question. Demonstrations continued for several days, and wreaths were placed outside the Xinhua News Agency Hong Kong Branch. This further fueled the mass migration wave of Hong Kong people out of Hong Kong.
- India: The government of India responded by ordering the state television to pare down the coverage to the barest minimum. The government's monopoly over television in the 1980s helped Prime Minister Rajiv Gandhi signal to Beijing that India would not revel in China's domestic troubles and offer some political empathy instead. The Communist Party of India (Marxist) was the only political party in the world to pass a resolution, hailing the crackdown on the protests, describing them as 'an imperialist attempt to internally subvert socialism, [which] was successfully thwarted by the CPC and the PLA.' Sitaram Yechury, now the CPI(M) General Secretary, proclaimed in 1989 at Jawaharlal Nehru University that “Not a drop of blood was shed at Tiananmen Square.”
- Indonesia: On 8 June, Indonesian Coordinating Minister for Political and Security Affairs Sudomo said “Despite the recent political turmoil in Beijing, the talks between Indonesia and China on the normalization of relations will continue.” On 12 June, Minister of State Mudiono said that the recent situation in China would not affect the process of normalizing diplomatic relations between Indonesia and China. On 22 June, Indonesian Foreign Minister Ali Alatas said that the recent events in China would not affect the process of normalizing relations between Indonesia and China and that “What is happening in China now is China’s internal affair. China has its own considerations and its own environment. We hope that these two things will not affect each other.” On 22 August, Minister of State Mudiono said that no obstacle could stop the normalization of relations between China and Indonesia.
- Iran: On 7 October, Iranian Foreign Minister Ali Akbar Velayati expressed his understanding of "China’s firm stance in dealing with the unrest and counter-revolutionary riots" and supported "the measures taken by China to restore order and achieve stability".
- Iraq: On 10 August, Iraqi National Assembly Chairman Sa'adi Mahdi Salih said that Iraq understood the Chinese government's actions. On 5 September, Adnan Salman, a candidate for regional leadership of the Iraqi Ba'ath Party, believed that it was "normal for these things to happen in China and that it was better for them to be exposed now". He expressed his understanding of the "effective measures taken by the Chinese Communist Party and the Chinese government to quell the riots". On 20 September, Iraqi Deputy Foreign Minister Zahavi said that Iraq was pleased with China's "quelling of the counter-revolutionary riots and the restoration of stability". He said that Iraq has always opposed using human rights issues to interfere in the internal affairs of other countries and to provoke incidents, and that Iraq opposes international organizations or institutions including issues that are purely China's internal affairs on their agendas.
- Japan: The Japanese government called the response "intolerable" and froze loans to China. On 5 June, Prime Minister Sōsuke Uno said "I am deeply concerned about the heavy casualties caused by the martial law troops' violent suppression in Tiananmen Square, Beijing. I hope the situation can stabilize." Starting 6 June, he instructed staff from the offices of Sanwa Bank, Daiwa Bank, The Sumitomo Bank, Nippon Life, Panasonic, Seibu Department Store, and Mitsukoshi Corporation in Beijing, Shanghai, and Xi'an to return to Japan; a total of 1,163 people returned that day. On 6 June, the Federation of Japanese Bankers Associations announced the freezing of two loans to China, amounting to $145 million. On the same day, opposition parties the Japanese Socialist Party, Komeito, and the Democratic Socialist Party issued statements of condemnation. On 7 June, Prime Minister Uno stated that the government cannot turn its guns on its own people and summoned the Chinese ambassador to convey the government's strong stance. In the afternoon, the Ministry of Foreign Affairs stated that "the actions of the Chinese government are unacceptable from a humanitarian perspective." On the same day, Chinese martial law troops opened fire on the apartments of diplomatic personnel, resulting in shootings at the residences of three Japanese embassy staff, leading the foreign ministry to lodge a strong protest. 1,774 Japanese citizens left Beijing that day. Chief Cabinet Secretary Masajuro Shiokawa recommended that Japanese citizens in Beijing seek refuge and implemented two policies: "First, provide emergency aid such as medicine through the Red Cross ; second, extend the visas of Chinese students in Japan." On 8 June, the Ministry of International Trade and Industry announced that China would be designated a special country, requiring approval for the export of every shipment. On 20 June, the Japanese government announced a freeze on $5.7 billion in loans to China, an action "equivalent to suspending all aid to China." In the July 1989 House of Councillors election, the image of the Japanese Communist Party declined because of this incident. As a result, the party issued a statement on the same day criticizing China for undermining socialist democracy. Japan was also the first member of the G7 to restore high level relations with China in the following months. From 11 September, the Japanese Ministry of Foreign Affairs decided to formally lift restrictions on visits to China for Japanese tourists and company employees. According to diplomatic documents from around 1989 released by the Japanese Ministry of Foreign Affairs on 23 December 2020, the Japanese government decided on 4 June to maintain friendly relations with China and oppose Western sanctions against China.
- Jordan: On 11 September, the Jordanian newspaper Ad-Dustour published an article entitled “The Lesson from China” written by Fayez Jaber Amin, Secretary General of the Jerusalem Affairs Committee, criticizing the Western media for distorting reports on the student incident in China. On 17 September, King Hussein of Jordan said that he had always taken a "completely understanding attitude towards what was happening in China", saying “for a time, I was worried about what was happening in China. I saw foreign forces interfering in Chinese affairs. Now, the situation in China has stabilized, and I am happy about that.”
- Kuwait: Kuwait voiced understanding of the measures taken by the Chinese authorities to protect social stability. On 1 October, the Kuwait Times published an article criticizing the economic sanctions imposed on China by Western countries and urging them to re-examine their policies toward China. The article said that Western countries were unwilling to impose economic sanctions on South African racism, and that taking such measures against China would not bring them any credibility. It said that any attempt to deny China's contribution to the cause of justice and freedom in the world is doomed to failure; the reports by Western media on what happened in China in early June were exaggerated and irresponsible, with more speculation than facts in these reports.
- Macau: Macau Governor Carlos Melancia said that "At this moment, I think the appropriate statement is: the use of force against unarmed people is unacceptable." On June 5, the Bank of China Macau branch and its subordinate banks experienced their first run, with HK$330 million withdrawn that day. On 17 June, when Melancia returned to Portugal to report on his work, he said that the Sino-Portuguese Joint Declaration would not be affected by the situation in China, because the Joint Declaration was binding on both countries. 150,000 protested in Macau.
- Malaysia: On 8 June, Prime Minister Mahathir Mohamad said “We have no intention of interfering in their internal affairs. However, we regret the fighting that has caused the deaths of many people, especially many young people.” On 21 June, Deputy Foreign Minister Abdullah Fadzil Che Wan said that Malaysia has always adhered to the principle of non-interference in the internal affairs of other countries in the recent unrest in China. On 23 August, the Malaysian representative attending the 10th ASEAN Inter-Parliamentary Organization meeting believed that the recent events in Beijing were purely China's internal affairs and that Malaysia would not interfere.
- Mongolia: The government of Mongolia expressed regret over the actions of the Chinese government. Many reformists and activists, including Davaadorjiin Ganbold, Tsakhiagiin Elbegdorj Sanjaasürengiin Zorig, Erdeniin Bat-Üül and Dogmidiin Sosorbaram had been aware of the international reaction to the military action, and chose to follow the democratic changes in Eastern Europe and the Soviet Union.
- North Korea: On 6 June the Korean Central News Agency stated that North Korea "Supports the government of the People's Republic of China in suppressing the riots." On 11 and 22 June, the Rodong Sinmun published articles condemning the United States for interfering in the internal affairs of other countries. On 11 August, Kim Yong-sun stated that the Workers' Party of Korea and the government firmly support the measures taken by China. On 23 August, Vice Premier Jeong Jun-ki, said that North Korea considers China's quelling of the counter-revolutionary riots in Beijing to be a revolutionary, decisive, and correct action, and stated that North Korea firmly opposes some Western countries taking advantage of China's quelling of the counter-revolutionary riots to launch an anti-China wave. On 30 August, Politburo member Ho Dam praised China's actions. On 24 September, North Korean leader Kim Il Sung, said that "some imperialists attempted to subvert the People's Republic of China by various means, but the Communist Party of China took decisive measures to restore social order". On 1 October, the Rodong Sinmun published an editorial entitled "Forty Years of Victory for the Chinese People," which praised China for its "victory in suppressing the counter-revolutionary riots". On 6 October, Foreign Minister Kim Yong-nam said China's suppression "once again powerfully proved that no force could stop the Chinese people, led by the Communist Party, from advancing victoriously under the banner of socialism." On 13 October, North Korean Premier Yon Hyong-muk emphasized that China's suppression of the protests "fully demonstrated the power and vitality of the Chinese Communist Party".
- North Yemen: On 17 October, North Yemeni Prime Minister Abdul Aziz Abdul Ghani expressed his pleasure at China's "stabilization following the suppression of the counter-revolutionary riots", and at "China's continued adherence to its independent foreign policy of peace and its commitment to reform and opening up". On October 29, Abdul Karim Abdullah al-Arashi, Speaker of the Consultative Council of the Yemeni Arab Republic, expressed his pleasure at the "stability of the situation following China's suppression of the riots".
- Pakistan: The Pakistani government expressed understanding and sympathy for China's suppression of the protests. At the United Nations meeting on the resolution to sanction China, the Pakistani representative to the UN Sardar Shah Nawaz said "Pakistan will, as always, firmly support the position of the People’s Republic of China government and resolutely oppose the UN’s open interference in the internal affairs of its members, especially in the affairs of China, one of the five permanent members of the Security Council." Pakistani Foreign Secretary Sahabzada Yaqub Khan said on 23 June that he was pleased with the return to normalcy in Beijing and the stability of the places he visited. On 27 June, Senate President Wasim Sajjad said that Pakistan hoped China would resolve its problems without external interference and wished the Chinese government success in its efforts to restore national stability. On 28 June, Pakistani Prime Minister Benazir Bhutto said that Pakistan and China are sincere friends who share weal and woe, and that the friendship between Pakistan and China can withstand the test of time. She said was very pleased to see that the situation in China had returned to normal. On 8 July, Wasim Sajjad said at a press conference that his recent visit to China was very successful. He said "We have found the situation in Beijing and elsewhere in China to be stable." On 21 December, Pakistani President Ghulam Ishaq Khan said that Pakistan understands and appreciates the Chinese government's "resolute suppression of the counter-revolutionary riots in Beijing in June of this year, which maintained political stability in China".
- Philippines: President Corazon Aquino expressed sadness at the massacre, urging the Chinese government to "urgently and immediately take steps to stop the aggressive and senseless killing by its armed forces". Socialist labor organization Kilusang Mayo Uno at first initially supported the action taken by Chinese authorities, though later issued a "rectified position" which blamed "insufficient information and improper decision making process". The Communist Party also expressed opposition due to its line considering China as "Revisionist" after renouncing Maoism and reviving Capitalism.
- Singapore: The Singapore government condemned the situation in China, stating "In this incident, the lives of all intellectuals should be cherished". Prime Minister Lee Kuan Yew, speaking on behalf of the Cabinet, said they were shocked and saddened by the response of the Chinese government, adding that "we had expected the Chinese government to apply the doctrine of minimum force when an army is used to quell civil disorder." In addition, from the following day, thousands of Singaporeans flocked to local branches of the Bank of China to withdraw their money. On 14 June, Singapore's First Deputy Prime Minister and Minister of Defence Goh Chok Tong said that the establishment of diplomatic relations between Singapore and China would proceed as planned. On 15 June, Goh Chok Tong said that despite the recent unrest in Beijing, Singapore would continue to strengthen its private economic ties with China.
- South Korea: South Korea was in the midst of efforts to develop relations with the People's Republic of China and President Roh Tae-woo remained quiet in the aftermath of the crackdown. On 5 June, the Ministry of Foreign Affairs expressed "grave concern" and hoped for no further deterioration of the situation. The statement also encouraged dialogue to resolve the issue peacefully. On 19 June, Foreign Minister Choi Ho-jung said that although the political situation in China was currently turbulent, the basic policy of China to seek stability on the Korean Peninsula remained unchanged; as Deng Xiaoping and other hardliners were still in power, it was expected that the political situation in the People's Republic of China would stabilize quickly. Choi Ho-jung also said that he believed that the People's Republic of China would continue to expand its economic and other non-political contacts with South Korea; although South Korea and the People's Republic of China did not have diplomatic relations, they were negotiating the issue of exchanging trade officials after they had successfully expanded their contacts in aviation, shipping, tourism, fisheries and joint ventures. At the same time, South Korea suspended negotiations on establishing diplomatic relations with the People's Republic of China for a year until 24 August 1992. On 2 August, China demanded that the South Korean government handed over Major Zuo Xiukai, a PLA officer who had crossed the border between North and South Korea, and his wife. Zuo Xiukai, who was a member of the Chinese delegation to the United Nations Armistice Military Commission, asked South Korea to allow him to seek asylum in the United States.
- Sri Lanka: On 30 August, Sri Lankan President Ranasinghe Premadasa said he understood the measures taken by the Chinese government in "quelling the counter-revolutionary riots in Beijing".
- Syria: On 18 June, Syrian Prime Minister Mahmoud Al-Zoubi said that "The riots in China were instigated by a small group of people. It is very necessary for the Chinese government to resolutely stop them." He sincerely hoped that the situation in China would return to calm as soon as possible. On 1 September, Abdullah al-Ahmar, assistant secretary-general of the National Command of the Syrian Ba'ath Party, condemned some Western countries for "launching a propaganda campaign against China, interfering in China’s internal affairs, and attempting to use rioters to overthrow China’s socialist regime". On 22 September, Foreign Minister Farouk al-Sharaa said that he was very pleased with China's "successful suppression of the riots in June this year" and that Syrian leaders fully understand the measures taken by the Chinese leaders to "safeguard the interests of the Chinese people". He said that the situation shows that some countries have blatantly interfered in China's internal affairs and that ithas been proven that there are foreign forces behind the student leaders who are trying to achieve the political goal of changing China's social system.
- Taiwan: President Lee Teng-hui issued a statement on 4 June strongly condemning the Chinese communist response: "Early this morning, Chinese communist troops finally used military force to attack the students and others demonstrating peacefully for democracy and freedom in Tiananmen Square in Peking, resulting in heavy casualties and loss of life. Although we anticipated this mad action of the Chinese communists beforehand, it still has moved us to incomparable grief, indignation and shock." He also said that “The inhumane practices adopted by the CCP will be judged by history. In protest against the CCP’s violent suppression of the democratic movement, I, Teng-hui, with the deepest sorrow, on behalf of the government and people of the Republic of China, call on all countries and people around the world who love freedom and value human rights to condemn the CCP’s atrocities in the strongest terms, provide all possible support to our compatriots on the mainland, and make a complete break with the CCP.” The Ministry of National Defense ordered on the same day that “all military personnel should return to their posts and immediately enter into combat readiness deployment.” The Executive Yuan also announced four special measures to support the democratic movement, including: issuing Republic of China passports to overseas students and scholars who renounced their mainland passports; and providing tuition and living allowances to these students and scholars. The authorities also lifted a ban on telephone communications to encourage private contacts and counter the news blackout on the PRC.
- Thailand: The Thai government had the warmest relations with Beijing out of all ASEAN members, and expressed confidence that the "fluid situation" in China had passed its "critical point", though it was concerned that it could delay a settlement in the Cambodian–Vietnamese War. Prime Minister Chatichai Choonhavan said: “I regret the events that happened in China. This is China’s internal affair and we will not consider any opinions” but added: “If a leader who takes a hard line is in a dominant position in China, it may slow down the resolution of the Cambodian conflict.” On 8 June, Thailand sent a special plane to evacuate 85 Thai citizens from Beijing, leaving only 10 officials at the Chinese Embassy. On 18 August, Prime Minister Choonhavan said: “Thailand has always had a close relationship with China. China’s quelling of the unrest in early June was China’s internal affair and Thailand has no intention of interfering.” On 20 October, Deputy Prime Minister Bhichai Rattakul said that Thailand has always believed that what happened in Beijing in June this year was China's internal affair and foreign countries have no right to interfere.
- United Arab Emirates: On 17 December, Emirate of Sharjah Ruler Sultan bin Muhammad Al-Qasimi said he understands the Chinese government's "actions to quell the unrest" and opposes "foreign interference in China's internal affairs".
- Vietnam: Despite Vietnam and China's history of strained relations, the Vietnamese government quietly supported the Chinese government. Media reported on the protests but offered no commentary, and state radio added that the PLA could not have stopped the action after "hooligans and ruffians insulted or beat up soldiers" and destroyed military vehicles. The government expressed that it wanted better relations with China, but did not want to go to the "extremes of Eastern Europe or Tiananmen" – referring to its own stability.

=== Europe ===
- Austria: On 5 June, President Kurt Waldheim, Chancellor Franz Vranitzky, and Foreign Minister Alois Mock issued statements expressing "extreme shock at the Beijing incident" and demanding that Chinese leaders immediately cease using the military and resolve the situation peacefully. The Ministry of Foreign Affairs summoned the Chinese ambassador to Austria that day, instructing him to convey the Austrian government's protest, cancel the welcoming ceremony for Chinese Justice Minister Cai Cheng who was visiting Austria, and close the Beijing representative offices of companies such as Voestalpine and Airlin.
- Belgium: Belgium's government cancelled a scheduled ministerial meeting on the 6th between two ministers of state and Chinese Minister of Economy and Trade Zheng Tuobin.
- Denmark: On 7 June, the Danish government cancelled export loans and aid totaling one billion Danish kroner (approximately US$150 million) to China. Svend Jakobsen, chairman of the Danish Parliament's Foreign Affairs Committee, said "The atrocities must stop. Aid can only be restored when a different political climate emerges in the country."
- Finland: On 5 June, Finnish Foreign Minister Pertti Paasio stated that "China's use of violence is incomprehensible." He added, "Socialist democracy is absolutely not about using armored vehicles against the masses, and the people's army is absolutely not about firing on the people." On the same day, Asko Mäki, Chairman of the Communist Party of Finland, issued a statement condemning the massacre.
- France: On 6 June, Prime Minister Michel Rocard announced the freezing of relations between France and China at all levels, and that the president, prime minister and government officials would no longer have any contact with Chinese leaders. On 7 June, the Ministry of Foreign Affairs announced that it would reduce the number of diplomats stationed in China to a minimum and indicated that military cooperation between France and China would also be completely suspended. French Foreign Minister, Roland Dumas, said he was "dismayed by the bloody repression" of "an unarmed crowd of demonstrators." On 28 September. French Foreign Minister Dumas spoke on behalf of the European Community at the United Nations General Assembly, saying that the June 4 crackdown was a violation of human rights. At a hearing of the French National Assembly's Foreign Affairs Committee on 18 October, Dumas replied that France had not changed its approach to political asylum seekers. As a place of asylum and reception, France does not allow political activities against governments that have diplomatic relations with France to take place on its territory.
- Greece: On 5 June the Greek Ministry of Foreign Affairs issued a statement expressing deep regret over the violent conflict and casualties, and hoping that the events in China would not lead to a dead end for the democratic process. The ruling PASOK, the largest opposition party New Democracy, the Communist Party of Greece, the Left Party of Greece, and the Greek Democratic Party all issued statements of condemnation on the same day, and more than 3,000 Greeks protested at the Chinese Embassy in Athens.
- Holy See: The Holy See of Vatican City has no official diplomatic relations with China, but Pope John Paul II expressed hope that the events in China would bring change.
- Italy: The Italian Communist Party leader Achille Occhetto condemned the "unspeakable slaughter in progress in China".
- Netherlands: The Dutch government froze diplomatic relations with China, and summoned the Chinese Chargé d'Affaires Li Qin Ping expressing shock at the "violent and brutal actions of the People's Liberation Army." On 6 June, the Dutch Ministry of Foreign Affairs announced the freezing of political, economic, and cultural relations between the Netherlands and China. Later that evening, the Ministry announced that the Dutch government had decided to suspend high-level contacts with China.
- Portugal: On 5 June, the government issued a statement saying, "We are deeply saddened by the tragedy that occurred in Beijing and firmly oppose the use of violence against unarmed civilians." On 5 June, Portuguese Prime Minister Aníbal Cavaco Silva said, "We express our concern about the situation in China and have decided to send a minister to Macau to comfort the residents of this territory that will be returned to China in 1999."
- Spain: On 5 June, Spanish Prime Minister Felipe González expressed "extreme concern" about the incident and "hoped that China could bring its democratization process to an end." On the evening of the 6th, the Ministry of Foreign Affairs announced a freeze on high-level contacts between Spain and China.
- Sweden: The Swedish government froze diplomatic relations with China. Sweden canceled Defense Minister Carlsson's visit to Beijing on the 5th, and also canceled former Chinese President and then Chairman of the National Committee of the Chinese People's Political Consultative Conference Li Xiannian 's visit to Sweden. On the 8th, the Swedish Foreign Ministry froze aid to China.
- Switzerland: On 5 June, the Swiss Federal Government delivered a note to the Chinese Embassy in Bern regarding the Beijing incident, "calling for restraint and respect for human rights, and hoping to replace the use of force with dialogue."
- United Kingdom: On the afternoon of 5 June, Foreign Secretary Geoffrey Howe summoned Song Mingjiang, the Chinese Chargé d'Affaires ad interim in Britain, and said he was “extremely shocked by the bloodshed in Beijing.” He also decided to cancel the visit of Chinese Justice Minister Cai Cheng to Britain and “cancel the visit of British Agriculture Secretary John McGregor to China. The Prime Minister, Margaret Thatcher, expressed "utter revulsion and outrage", and was "appalled by the indiscriminate shooting of unarmed people." She promised to relax immigration laws for Hong Kong residents. On 6 June, she said in the House of Commons that “This bloodshed shows that the Communist Party is always ready to impose its will on simple-minded people by force,... Obviously, it is impossible for (Britain) to continue normal relations with China,” and said out that she could not see how to contact the Chinese government about the future of Hong Kong. The Mirror Group stopped publishing the official English-language newspaper China Daily in Europe from 7 June. Howe said in a speech in the House of Commons on 13 June that the recent events in China had not rendered the Sino-British Joint Declaration on the Hong Kong Question ineffective. On 17 June, the UK announced the postponement of the 13th meeting of the Sino-British Joint Liaison Group, originally scheduled to be held in London from 18 to 21 July 1989.
- West Germany: The West German Foreign Ministry urged China "to return to its universally welcomed policies of reform and openness." On 5 June, President Richard von Weizsäcker said "I not only express my deepest regret for the use of force, but also hope that China will return to a method that is in line with its humanitarian traditions." The Federal Foreign Office announced that West Germany had terminated high-level meetings with China and had coordinated with the United States, the United Kingdom and France. The Federal Government issued a formal statement calling on the Chinese government not to use any more violence and to resolve the crisis through dialogue. On the 8th, the autumn meeting of the German-Chinese Economic Committee was canceled. At the plenary session of the Inter-Parliamentary Union, which began on September 4, the West German parliamentary delegation put forward a proposal on "China's suppression of peaceful protesters", which was later rejected.
  - West Berlin: The sister party of the ruling party in East Germany, the SEW, criticized the crackdown. Thus, the SEW deviated officially from the course of the SED for the first time. Following pressure from the SED, however, the SEW office then presented an "oral supplement" at the 13th session of the executive committee, in which the events in VRC were again evaluated in the sense of the SED.

==== Eastern bloc ====
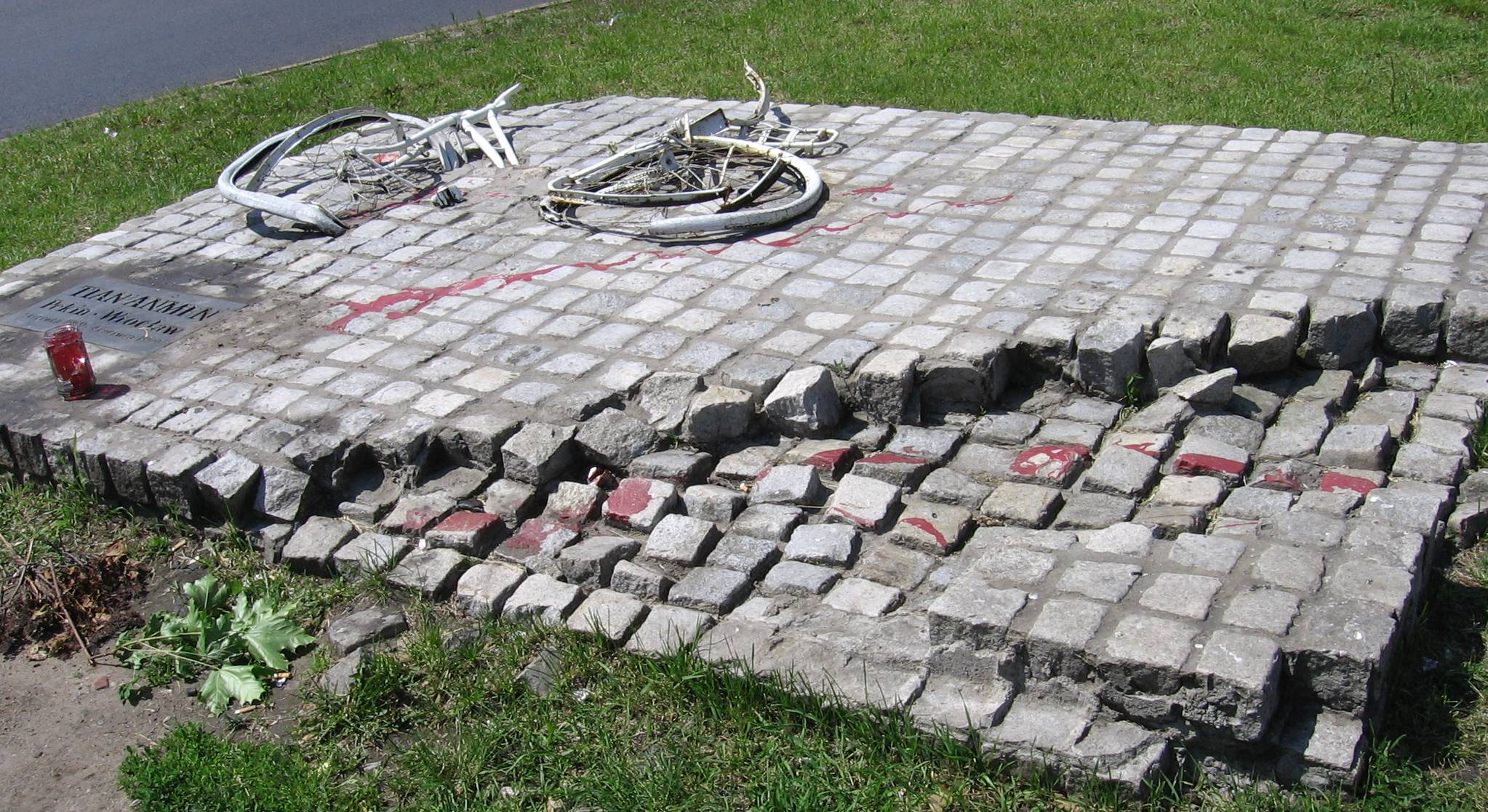
A memorial in the Polish city of Wrocław depicting a destroyed bicycle and a tank track is a symbol of the Tiananmen Square protests

- Albania: Albania supported the Chinese government's crackdown on the protests.
- Bulgaria: The Bulgarian government supported China's "measures to stabilize its domestic situation" and opposed "foreign interference in China’s internal affairs".
- Czechoslovakia: The government of Czechoslovakia supported the Chinese government's response, expressing the idea that China would overcome its problems and further develop socialism. In response, the Chinese side "highly valued the understanding shown by the Czechoslovak Communist Party and people" for suppressing the "anti-socialist" riots in Beijing.
- East Germany: The government of the German Democratic Republic approved of the military action. East German leader Erich Honecker said that "The use of force to suppress counter-revolutionaries is right." On 8 June the Volkskammer unanimously passed a statement which said that "the German Democratic Republic and the People's Republic of China are friendly brother countries. Both countries will celebrate the 40th anniversary of their founding in October. The members of the Volkskammer believe that under the current circumstances, the intention of the Party and government of the People's Republic of China to resolve the issue through political means is hindered by unconstitutional forces. Therefore, the people's government is forced to use armed forces to maintain social order and public safety, resulting in casualties. The Volkskammer of the German Democratic Republic regards the Beijing incident as an internal affair of the People's Republic of China and opposes any form of foreign interference. The representatives of the Volkskammer of the Democratic Republic firmly believe that the Chinese government and people will work together to clarify the facts and continue on the socialist path freely chosen 40 years ago." On 11 June, East German Foreign Minister Oscar Fischer reiterated the position of East Germany as stated in the 8 June statement of the Volkskammer on the current situation in China, expressing his firm belief that the Chinese people will be able to solve the problems they face and continue to advance along the socialist path. Politburo member Joachim Herrmann reiterated the views and positions stated in the 8 June statement in his report to the eighth plenary session of the 11th Central Committee of the Socialist Unity Party on 22 June pointing out that what happened in Beijing was purely China's internal affair and opposing any foreign interference. High-ranking politicians from the SED party, including Hans Modrow, Günter Schabowski and Egon Krenz, were in China shortly afterward on a goodwill visit. In contrast, members of the general population, including ordinary SED party members, participated in protests against the actions of the Chinese government.
- Hungary: The Hungarian government, which was undergoing political reform, reacted strongly to the incident. The Foreign Minister described the events as a "horrible tragedy", and the government expressed "shock", adding that "fundamental human rights could not be exclusively confined to the internal affairs of any country." On 5 June, State Minister Imre Pozsgay and Foreign Minister Gyula Horn said that “the Beijing incident is very regrettable and also serves as a serious warning to us. We must take all measures to ensure that no regime can use such means to consolidate its conservative rule and dictatorship.” The Hungarian government said that “this tragedy proves how important the spirit of tolerance and responsibility for the fate of the nation is for politicians exercising power in the process of reform, and how necessary it is for the government to establish laws that guarantee basic human rights.” On the 7th, the Hungarian government said that “using weapons and violence” is meaningless and cannot solve the problem. “Respect for basic human rights is the common cause and international obligation of each of us. No country can regard it as an absolute internal affair.” That afternoon, Gross, General Secretary of the Hungarian Socialist Workers’ Party, issued a statement: “First, we strongly condemn violence and war between brothers. This method is incompatible with socialism. Second, I sincerely hope that reason will prevail and that we will return to the path of peaceful construction as soon as possible.” The Hungarian Foreign Minister described the incident as a “terrible tragedy.” Demonstrations were held outside the Chinese embassy. Hungary was the only country in Europe to have substantially reduced relations with China in the aftermath of the events.
- Poland: The Polish government criticised the response of the Chinese government but not the government itself. A government spokesman called the incident "tragic", with "sincere sympathy for the families of those killed and injured." On 6 June, a spokesperson for the Polish government said: "Polish society and authorities learned of the tragic events in Beijing with deep concern. We extend our sincerest condolences to the families of the dead and injured." "We believe that the Chinese will not resort to force as in the past... Reason and realism will prevail, and China's reform process and its international status will not be weakened." On 13 June, Polish leader Wojciech Jaruzelski said "China is a vast and mysterious country. I can only feel sorry for what happened." Regarding military control, "We only have reason to make such a decision when the very foundation of the country is threatened." Daily protests and hunger strikes took place outside the Chinese embassy in Warsaw. The government also expressed hope that it did not affect Sino-Polish relations. After Solidarity assumed the political leadership of Poland, the new government issued new stamps to commemorate the student protests in Tiananmen Square in China in the Spring of 1989.
- Romania: Nicolae Ceauşescu praised the military action, and in a reciprocal move, China sent Qiao Shi to the Romanian Communist Party Congress in August 1989, at which Ceauşescu was re-elected.
- Soviet Union: General Secretary Mikhail Gorbachev did not explicitly condemn the actions, but called for reform. On 6 June, the Supreme Soviet of the Soviet Union issued a "Statement on the Chinese Incident" stating "No matter how intense the emotions may be at times, it is important to patiently seek a suitable political solution determined by the goal of social unity" and that "The events currently unfolding in China are an internal affair of that country. Any attempt by other parties to exert pressure is inappropriate. Such attempts will only escalate emotions and will by no means promote stability." It continued "We sincerely hope that the friendly Chinese people can turn the page on this tragic chapter of their history as soon as possible." On 9 June, Soviet government spokesman Gennadi Gerasimov said "We were extremely shocked that such a thing happened" and that "We have been unable to contact the Chinese capital by telephone since the violence in Beijing last weekend." There was an interest on building relations on a recent summit in Beijing, but the events fueled discussion on human rights and Soviet foreign policy. There was some private criticism of the Chinese response. Newly formed opposition groups condemned the military action. Ten days after the incident the government expressed regret, calling for political dialogue. Public demonstrations occurred at the Chinese embassy in Moscow. A spokesman on 10 June said the Kremlin was "extremely dismayed" at the incident. On 15 June, Mikhail Gorbachev said “We are all very uneasy about the situation in China. We are all worried about whether the process of profound reform and transformation of this great country will be interrupted,” and pointed out that the massacre had a negative impact on the improvement of the international situation.
- Yugoslavia: The Presidency of the League of Communists of Yugoslavia issued a statement expressing regret over the tragic events and the loss of innocent lives, and expressing concern that China's economic and political reforms might be halted. The statement expressed hope that China would resolve the crisis through political efforts and open dialogue, and work with all democratic and progressive forces to ensure the continuation of economic and social reforms. On 8 June, Yugoslav Foreign Minister Budimir Lončar stated that "the conflict between economic openness and its consequences has affected China's socio-political trends, and they have not been valued equally by everyone." He added that "regardless of which development ideology prevails in China, developments in China will inevitably affect its international relations, and the country is facing difficult times." The national news agency Tanjug in the non-aligned country said the protest became a "symbol of destroyed illusions and also a symbol of sacrificed ideals which have been cut off by machine gun volleys and squashed under the caterpillars of heavy vehicles."

=== North America ===
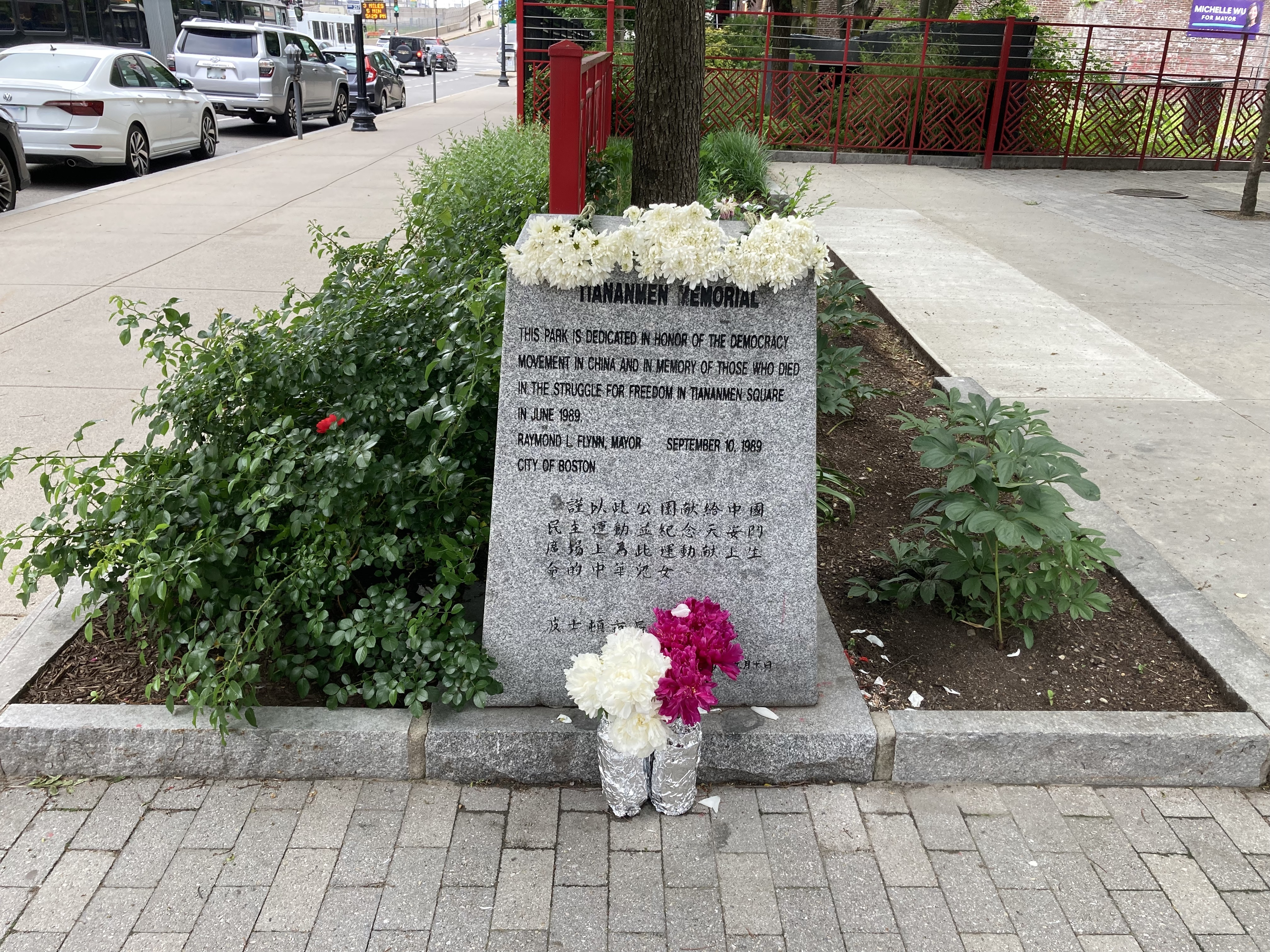
Tiananmen Memorial at Chinatown, Boston.

- Canada: The External Affairs Minister Joe Clark described the incident as "inexcusable" and issued a statement: "We can only express horror and outrage at the senseless violence and tragic loss of life resulting from the indiscriminate and brutal use of force against students and civilians of Peking." In Vancouver, varying reactions to the military action led to friction in the city's Chinese community.
- United States: The United States Congress and media criticized the military action. President George H. W. Bush suspended military sales and visits to that country. Large scale protests against the Chinese government took place around the country. On 5 June, the House of Representatives passed a resolution condemning the Beijing crackdown and supporting the President's action to sever military cooperation with China by a vote of 406 to 0. On 6 June, the Senate voted 100 to 0 to demand that the President impose sanctions on China, including a requirement for Voice of America to add Chinese-language programming. On the same day, the State Department announced that all Chinese citizens could remain in the United States after their visas expired. On 7 June, in response to martial law troops opening fire on diplomatic apartments, the U.S. Embassy ordered the evacuation of diplomatic personnel, with 125 people leaving China. On 8 June, U.S. Secretary of State James Baker said it was impossible to determine who was in power in China and called on American citizens to leave China. On 20 June, White House spokesman Marlin Fitzwater announced that President Bush had instructed the U.S. government to take new “sanctions” against China, to stop all high-level contacts with Chinese government officials, and to seek international financial institutions to postpone new loans to China. On 27 June, President Bush rejected domestic calls for a tougher stance against China and insisted on maintaining the prospect of improved relations. “Avoiding long-term damage to U.S.-China relations is in the strategic interest of the United States,” he said. “I can continue to express my indignation about the events at Tiananmen Square, and I will, but I am also determined to do my best not to harm the people we want to help, I mean ordinary Chinese people.” The U.S. government issued green cards to all Chinese citizens who stayed in the U.S. between 4 June 1989 and 11 April 1990. The U.S. Congress passed the Chinese Students Protection Act of 1992 for this purpose. George Washington University revealed that, through high-level secret channels on 30 June 1989, the US government conveyed to the government of the People's Republic of China that the events around the Tiananmen Square protests were an "internal affair". U.S. public opinion of China dropped significantly after the Tiananmen Square protests, from 72% having favorable opinions of China before the Tiananmen Protests to only 34% in August 1989.

=== Oceania ===
- Australia: The Prime Minister, Bob Hawke, wept at a memorial service in the Great Hall in Parliament and canceled his previously agreed-upon visit to China. The Australian government granted Chinese students a four-year asylum to stay in Australia. Foreign Minister Gareth Evans announced the temporary suspension of all ministerial-level diplomatic affairs with China and the suspension of the still-in-development military cooperation plan with China. The Australian government subsequently decided to grant asylum to international students in Australia for four years. On 27 June, Prime Minister Hawke expressed his support for the United States’ policy toward China, but said that imposing sanctions on the world's most populous country would have the opposite effect.
- New Zealand: On the afternoon of the 6th, Prime Minister David Lange announced that "The Cabinet has decided to ask Foreign Minister Russell Marshall to summon Chinese Ambassador to New Zealand Ni Zhengjian and tell him that the New Zealand government is disgusted by the bloodshed in Beijing." The visit of the Minister of Police to China, originally scheduled for 20 June, was cancelled, and contact between New Zealand government ministers and Chinese government representatives was suspended. The Cabinet also called on its citizens not to travel to China.

=== South America ===
- Brazil: On 5 July, the government issued a statement expressing its "deep sorrow over the turmoil caused to the people and government of this friendly country." This statement broke with Brazil's usual practice of avoiding commenting on other domestic affairs. However, on 7 July, Brazilian President José Sarney stated that he was confident that the already strong friendly and cooperative relationship between the two countries would continue to be consolidated and developed without any impact.
- Bolivia: On 29 June, Senate President Ciro Humboldt stated that the visit to China was extremely valuable because the delegation members' firsthand experiences demonstrated that the situation in China was stable. He said that Bolivia has consistently adhered to the principle of "one country, no interference in the internal affairs of another" for many years. This principle now also applies to China, meaning that foreign countries should not interfere in a country's decision-making regarding its internal affairs. He added that Bolivia has experienced the hardships of foreign interference and therefore fully understands China's current situation. Speaker of the House of Representatives Walter Soriano stated that mutual support among developing countries is crucial. Interference by some countries in China's internal affairs is not in the interest of the people of the world.
- Colombia: On 23 June, President Virgilio Barco Vargas praised the Chinese government's reform and opening-up policy and expressed understanding of the Chinese government's stance on suppressing the protests. On 1u August, Colombian Ambassador to China José María Gómez said that the Colombian government supported China's recent stance on suppressing the counter-revolutionary riots and that the recent events in Beijing were purely China's internal affairs and that other countries had no right to interfere. On 22 August, Colombian Senate President Luis Guillermo Giraldo pointed out that the international community should respect the policies and measures taken by the Chinese government to resolve domestic problems. On 31 August, Foreign Minister Julio Londoño said that Colombia had been paying close attention to the recent events in China. He revealed that although the Colombian government was under pressure from certain groups at home and abroad, President Barco's government still insisted on the existing friendly relations between Colombia and China and opposed foreign interference in China's internal affairs.
- Cuba: Cuba supported the government of China. On 30 September, the Communist Party of Cuba's central organ newspaper Granma published an article praising the achievements of the People's Republic of China in socialist construction over the past forty years. The article, entitled “Overcoming Difficulties”, pointed out that since 1 October 1949, the Chinese people, having broken the shackles of colonialism, began the road of socialist construction and opened a new chapter in their lives. In the forty years since the founding of the People's Republic of China, the Chinese people have worked hard and overcome all kinds of great difficulties. The article said, “At present, when imperialism is fueling the counter-revolutionary backlash in socialist countries, we appreciate the position of the fraternal Chinese people and the Chinese Communist Party in defending socialist construction.”
- Nicaragua: On 10 September Henry Ruiz, a member of the National Leadership Committee of the Sandinista National Liberation Front and Minister of Foreign Cooperation, said that Nicaragua "unconditionally supported the decisive measures taken by China to quell the counter-revolutionary riots. Imperialism not only undermines China, but also other Third World countries. Nicaragua opposes all foreign interference and believes that China's internal affairs should be resolved by China itself".
- Peru: On 5 September, Peruvian House Speaker Fernando León de Vivero said that the Peruvian people were "deeply worried when a few Western countries took advantage of the recent events in China to stir up an anti-China wave and attempt to overthrow the legitimate government of China". He said, “Now we are satisfied to see that the Chinese government has restored its authority and sovereignty.” He also said, “For China, the worst moment has passed.” On 11 September, Peruvian Prime Minister Luis Alberto Narváez Acosta said that he was satisfied with China's adherence to the reform and opening-up policy and said, “I am satisfied with the Chinese government’s ability to quickly quell the riots and announce its adherence to the reform and opening-up policy.” On 22 September, Peruvian Senate Speaker Humberto Carranza Piedra expressed support for the Chinese government's measures to quell the riots. He said, “Peru has suffered greatly from anti-government subversion activities and deeply understands the importance of protecting the constitution and laws. Therefore, we understand the measures taken by the Chinese government to quell the riots.” “After the Beijing incident, pro-imperialist forces made many distorted reports about China.” He said that “Peru has always adhered to the principles of self-determination and non-interference and opposes the interference of major powers in the internal affairs of other countries.”
- Venezuela: On 1 September, Venezuelan President Carlos Andrés Pérez said he understood the Chinese government's measures to "quell the unrest" and believed that China had the right to decide its own affairs. Pérez expressed his belief that China, under the leadership of the new Party Central Committee, would continue to move forward along the path of reform and opening up.

== Reaction of Chinese in North America, Hong Kong and Taiwan ==
=== The Chinese Communist Party and the aftermath of the massacre ===
The CCP, under the leadership of Premier Li Peng and Party General Secretary Jiang Zemin, sought to minimize the impact of the Tiananmen Square Massacre on China's international image. They gave multiple "reassuring public speeches" in an attempt to avoid the loss of Most Favoured Nation trade status with the United States as well as to alter the opinion of overseas Chinese. Beijing offered inducements to the overseas Chinese intellectuals that lead the overseas pro-democratic movements, attempting to regain their loyalty. Many overseas Chinese, however, view the 1989 Tiananmen Square protests and massacre as yet another example of communist repression in a long string of similar incidents.

=== Hong Kong ===
Following the crackdown, rallies supporting Tiananmen Square protesters erupted throughout the world. In the days following the initial crackdown, 200,000 people in Hong Kong formed a massive rally, one of the largest in Hong Kong's history, to mourn the dead and protest the Chinese government's brutality. This protest was also tinged with fear, however, as the spectre of reunification with China hung over their heads. Reunification, even under the "one country, two systems" doctrine sent hundreds of thousands of Hong Kongers scrambling for a chance to immigrate to another country. In the end "thousands of people... disillusioned and worried about their future, moved overseas". But many Hong Kong denizens continued to protest the crackdown in the PRC, calling for unity with the Chinese people in fighting for democracy.

Following the massacre, Hong Kong's largest ever protest erupted as people protested in support of the student movement. This protest was organized by the newly created Hong Kong Alliance in Support of Patriotic Democratic Movements in China. Over 1.5 million joined the march. Hong Kong's protest was the largest protest against the crackdown outside Beijing.

=== Taiwan ===
While many in Taiwan also protested the CCP's handling of the 4 June crackdown, going so far as to stage a "hands across the island" demonstration, there seemed to be an ambivalence to the events in China. Chou Tien-Jui, publisher of a weekly news magazine called The Journalist commented that "people in Taiwan think that Tiananmen Square is very far away.... They think that we have plenty of local issues to be concerned about." Other than the Hands across the island demonstration, there seemed to only be a "muted and controlled local response to the upheaval in China." What demonstrations did happen seemed "more dutiful than enthusiastic". ROC President Lee Teng-hui issued a statement on 4 June commenting that "although [the Taiwanese government] anticipated this mad action of the Chinese communists beforehand, it still has moved us to incomparable grief, indignation and shock".

=== Canada ===
5 June 1989 was marked by mass protests against the Beijing government by Chinese Canadians. The Chinese consulate in Toronto was picketed by 30,000 protesters of Chinese descent or their supporters. Members of the protest called for an end to the bloodshed as well as "death to Premier Li Peng". Five Hundred Chinese Canadians rallied in front of the Chinese consulate in Vancouver. In Halifax, one hundred Chinese students protested the actions of the PLA and the resulting violence. Chinese students at the University of Manitoba held their protests in the provincial legislature. Allan Chan, from the University of Calgary, commented that the government action was inevitable because "the students tried to push too hard... [and that] you can't change a whole society overnight". Yan Xiaoqiao, a PhD chemistry student enrolled in Simon Fraser University, said "today is one of the darkest days in Chinese history". Many of the Chinese foreign exchange students studying in Canada opted to apply for permanent residency in the aftermath of 4 June rather than return to China.

There were international responses toward the Tiananmen Square protests of 1989. In Vancouver, British Columbia, the Chinese community was among those who stood up against the Chinese Communist Party's decision to take military action against student protesters. To demonstrate their support of the students in Tiananmen Square, various Chinese Canadian Organizations protested in Vancouver.

==== Vancouver's Chinese community protests ====
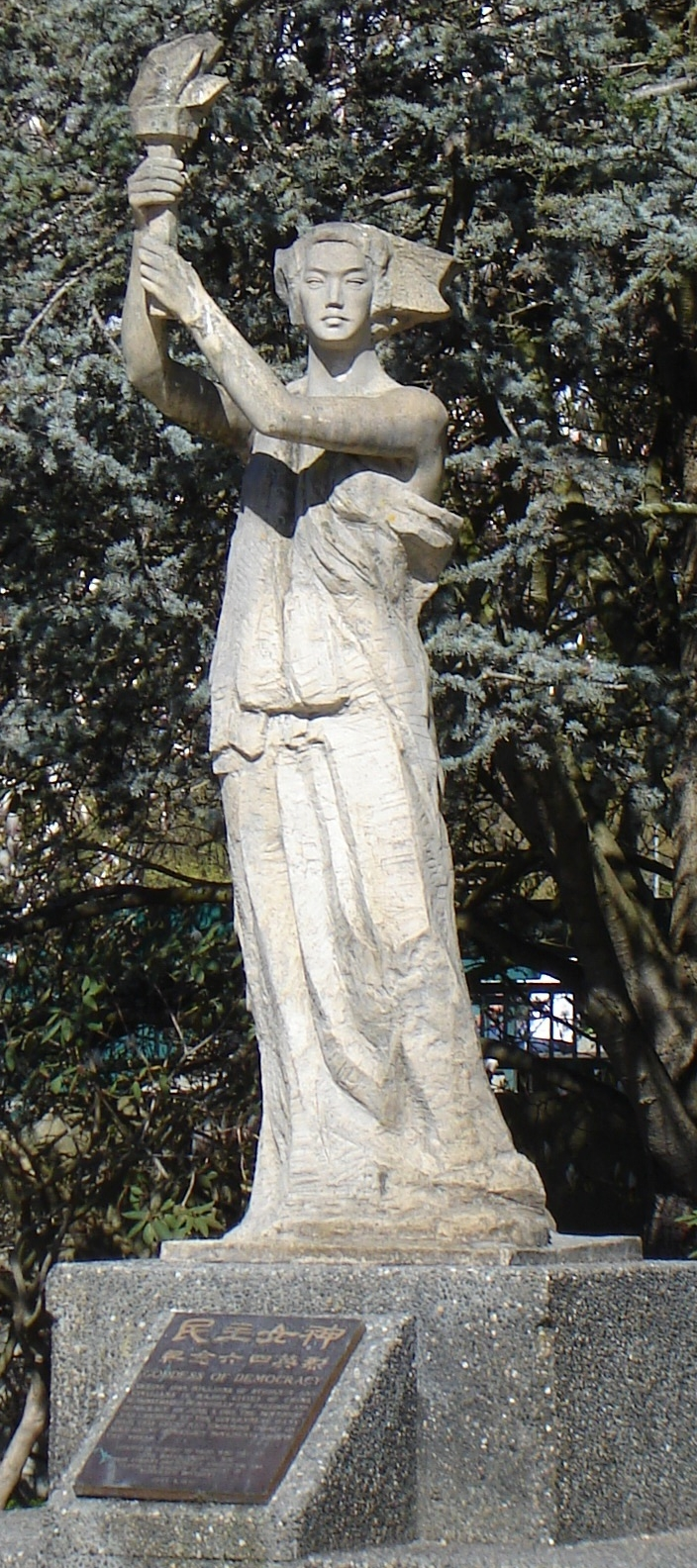
Goddess of Democracy replica at the Vancouver campus of the University of British Columbia

Using tactics similar to those used by the university students in Beijing, 1,000 protesters took to Granville Street in Vancouver, British Columbia and marched to the Chinese Consulate. The Vancouver Sun reported that protesters wore black armbands, carried banners with slogans like "Li Peng, you are a beast!" or "Today's menu Deng Xiaoping Stew—Free delivery all over China" and demanded a statement from the consul-general. Members of various Chinese organizations attended the demonstration including vice-president of the Chinese Benevolent Association of Canada, Gim Huey. Huey said that the weekend massacre in Beijing has ended support for state communism in China. Chinese university students from British Columbia also participated in the events. A student from the University of Victoria said, "Tiananmen Square has never been attacked by any government, even the Japanese, Chinese culture has a long civilization that was destroyed by the government".

In the following weeks the demonstrations continued. On 6 June 1989, 5,000 members of the Vancouver Chinese community, also marched down Granville Street in Vancouver to the Chinese Consulate and held a 40-minute candlelight memorial service. Six days later, on 12 June 1989, more members of the Vancouver's Chinese community rallied in Vancouver's Chinatown. A group of 13,000 protesters joined this rally, which was followed by a speech by local political leader, Ed Broadbent of the New Democratic Party. Broadbent called for the immediate withdrawal of the Canadian Ambassador in China and an emergency debate of the crisis by the United Nations Security Council. Afterward, demonstrators took turns expressing their feelings about the Chinese Government's decisions to use military violence on students. A Chinese student from Simon Fraser University stated, "For each of those who have fallen, 1,000 Chinese will come forward and rise up".

==== Dispute over the Goddess of Democracy in Vancouver ====
On 22 August 1989, Vancouver's Chinese community, as well as other human rights activists, united at Robson Square to commemorate the 1989 Tiananmen Square Massacre with an art exhibition. The exhibition displayed different media sources such as videos, images, news clippings, and included discussions for a replica of the Beijing students, 'Goddess of Democracy'.

After the exhibition, the community debated on an appropriate space for a replica statue. Members of Vancouver's Society in Support of Democratic Movement believed that a replica of the Goddess of Democracy should be placed in Vancouver's Dr. Sun Yat-Sen Classical Chinese Garden. The garden's namesake is the nationalist leader, considered to be the father of modern China). However, the garden's boards of trustees did not want the statue, because the garden was not a political forum. Others speculate that the trustees did not want the statue because the Chinese Communist Party donated more than $500,000 to the building of the Dr. Sun Yat-Sen Garden. The Goddess of Democracy debate continued on 26 August 1989 and Gim Huey, chairman of Vancouver's Chinese Benevolent Association, pleaded that the statue must be in Dr. Sun Yat-Sen Garden, stating that it was "not political" but was "promoting freedom and democracy". Huey believed that "Dr. Sun Yat-Sen stood for freedom and that's the whole spirit of the Garden". When talks with the Vancouver Parks Board failed, the proposed replica statue had no home. Finally, after much lobbying, the 'Vancouver Society in Support for the Democracy Movement' was optimistic when new talks began with the University of British Columbia. Reportedly, "the society approached UBC through a campus organization of Chinese students and scholars and got a warm welcome". Talks were successful in finding the statue a home, and these plans were followed through as the 'Goddess of Democracy' statue was moved to the grounds of the University of British Columbia.

==== Split over National Day in Vancouver ====
China's National Day, celebrated on 1 October, further stirred up feelings over the Tiananmen Square Massacre. National Day celebrates the founding of the People's Republic of China. In Vancouver, the Chinese community was divided on how to celebrate National Day. Two separate events were planned. Supporters for democracy in China proposed a 24-hour fast along with a reenactment of the Beijing students' tent camps. The Chinese Cultural Center and Chinese Benevolent Association proposed that regular National Day events like lion dancing and dinner should take place. Bill Chu from the Canadian Christians for Democratic Movement in China stated that decisions to continue regular National Day celebrations were another Chinese government cover-up and that telephone polls showed that "71.6% of Vancouver's Chinese community opposed celebrations". Tommy Toa, former director of the Chinese Benevolent Association stated, "To celebrate national Day without condemnation of the current Chinese government is hypocritical [...] I believe if we celebrate anything we should celebrate the courage and determination of the Chinese people seeking democracy". In reaction to the pro-democracy stance, the director of the Chinese Cultural Center Dr. K.T Yue said that because Canada still recognized the Chinese government, "we go along with the government", even though he sympathized with the democracy movement.

On 1 October 1989, the National Day events unfolded with two clear stances. A protest of more than 500 pro-Democracy supporters, was held outside the Main Street SkyTrain station in Vancouver, against the Tiananmen Square Massacre. Chan Kwok-Kin criticized those who attended the regular National Day celebrations stating, "I think those who are feasting are doing so for personal gain". Others like the Chinese Benevolent Association's president, Bill Yee, defended their National Day celebration, arguing that it was rooted in a 30-year-old tradition.

=== Setting a precedent in law – United States ===
As veterans of the 4 June movement settled into lives in their adopted countries, some, like Wang Dan, chose to continue the fight against the CCP. He, along with four other protesters, launched a lawsuit against Li Peng for his part in the military crackdown. Their goal was to "prove that he is accountable for the crime, and that this kind of crime, the human rights violation, is beyond China's borders".
