= Ideology of the Chinese Communist Party =

The Chinese Communist Party (CCP) frames its ideology as Marxism–Leninism adapted to the historical context of China, which it calls the Sinicization of Marxism, often expressing it as socialism with Chinese characteristics. Major ideological contributions of the CCP's leadership are viewed as "Thought" or "Theory," with "Thought" carrying greater weight. Influential concepts include Mao Zedong Thought, Deng Xiaoping Theory, and Xi Jinping Thought. Other important concepts include the socialist market economy, Jiang Zemin's idea of the Three Represents, and Hu Jintao's Scientific Outlook on Development.

== Definition ==
In the early days of the CCP, the prevailing nationalism and populism in 1910s China played an important part in the ideology of early communists such as Li Dazhao and Mao Zedong. On the one hand, Marxism was a spiritual utopia to the early communists, while, on the other hand, they modified or "Sinicized" some doctrines of communist ideology in a realistic and nationalist way to support their revolution in China. In the process of establishment, land reform, and collectivization, these ideological syntheses led to the emergence of the famous Great Leap Forward movement and the Cultural Revolution.

In recent years, it has been argued, mainly by foreign commentators, that the CCP does not have an ideology, and that the party organization is pragmatic and interested only in what works. The CCP claims otherwise. For instance, CCP general secretary Hu Jintao stated in 2012 that the Western world is "threatening to divide us" and that "the international culture of the West is strong while we are weak ... ideological and cultural fields are our main targets".

The CCP did not put a great deal of effort into the party schools and crafting its ideological message. Before the "Practice Is the Sole Criterion for Truth" campaign, the relationship between ideology and decision-making was a deductive one, meaning that policy-making was derived from ideological knowledge. Under Deng, this relationship was turned upside down, with decision-making justifying ideology and not the other way around. Lastly, Chinese policy-makers believe that one of the reasons for the dissolution of the Soviet Union was its stagnant party ideology. They therefore believe that their party ideology must be dynamic to safeguard the party's rule, unlike the Communist Party of the Soviet Union, whose ideology became "rigid, unimaginative, ossified, and disconnected from reality."

The CCP's ideological framework distinguishes between political ideas described as "Thought" (as in Mao Zedong Thought) or as "Theory" (as in Deng Xiaoping Theory). Thought carries more weight than Theory and conveys the greater relative importance of a leader's ideological and historical influence. The process of formalizing a leader's political thinking in the Marxist tradition is important in establishing a leader's ideological legitimacy.

== Ideals and convictions ==
In the article "Revolutionary Ideals are Higher than Heaven-Studying" (published in 2013), a person writing under the pen name "Autumn Stone", supports CCP General Secretary Xi Jinping's policy of strengthening the ideological conviction of party cadres, since (as the Leninist mantra goes) ideological unity leads to party unity. The writer claims "Ideals and convictions are the spiritual banners for the united struggle of a country, nation and party, wavering ideals and convictions are the most harmful form of wavering." Adhering to the ideals and convictions of the party creates a link between the party and the masses, and will let the party "gain victories wherever" it goes. Since the dissolution of the Soviet Union, the core spiritual values of members have become more important than ever, considering the restrengthened position of world capitalism. Xi Jinping believes that wavering conviction in the party's ideals leads to increased corruption and unwanted behaviour. Exemplary members have existed before, such as Xia Minghan who said "Don't fear being beheaded, as long as one's ism is true", Yang Chao's "The heaven's are full of rain, wind and worry, for the Revolution, it is unnecessary to fear losing one's head" and Fang Zhimin's statement that "The enemy can only cut off our heads, but cannot shake our beliefs!" The author suggest that these men were incorruptible because they carried the party's ideals and convictions. The dissolution of the Soviet Union, the writer suggests, was in key parts due to the ideological wavering of officials; claiming that even Mikhail Gorbachev, the last Soviet leader, had acknowledged in private that communist ideals had become obsolete to him. Disintegration in the ideological arena can lead to breaches in other areas of the party's edifice, paving the way for party collapse, the author states.

In 2006, at the 16th Plenary Session of the 16th Central Committee, the CCP leadership under General Secretary Hu Jintao expressed the need to create a new value system, referred to as the Core Socialist Values. In his speech, entitled "Resolution on Major Issues Concerning the Building of a Socialist Harmonious Society", to the 16th Plenary Session Hu Jintao stated;

The guiding ideology of Marxism, the common ideal of the socialism with Chinese characteristics, the national spirit with patriotism as the core, the spirit of the times with reform and innovation as the core, and the socialist concept of honour and disgrace constitute the basic contents of the socialist core values system. We should persist in integrating the socialist core values system into the entire process of national education and the building of a spiritual civilization and having it run through the various aspect of the modernization drive.

The CCP's Central Policy Research Office is responsible for developing the party's ideology.

== Marxism–Leninism and Mao Zedong Thought ==
I am a Marxist. The essence of Marxism is change, [...] The Marxist in China today is not a stubborn, dogmatic, and outdated 19th-century old man, but a dynamic, pro-change, young thinker. We have a flexible approach: if Marx's words are still applicable, we will use them; for things he did not articulate clearly, we will spell them out; for what he did not say, we will boldly come up with something new.

— Ye Xiaowen on the role of Marxist thought.

The People's Daily describes Marxism–Leninism as part of its "ideological foundation", which is regarded as the combined developments of classical Marxism (the works of Karl Marx and Friedrich Engels) and Leninism (the thoughts of Vladimir Lenin). According to the CCP, "Marxism–Leninism reveals the universal laws governing the development of history of human society" which provides "a vision of the contradictions in the capitalist system" and shows that socialist and subsequently communist society will "inevitably replace" capitalism. Marx and Engels are described as first creating the theory behind Marxist party building; Lenin then developed it in practice before, during and after the Russian Revolution of 1917. The party regards Lenin's own party-building as his "foremost achievement", through concepts such as the vanguard party of the working class and democratic centralism.

The 1929 Gutian Congress was important in establishing the principle of party control over the military, which continues to be a core principle of the party's ideology. In the short term, this concept was further developed in the June 1930 Program for the Red Fourth Army at All Levels and the winter 1930 Provisional Regulations on the Political Work of the Chinese Workers and Peasants Army (Draft), which formally established Party leadership of the military.

Mao Zedong Thought is Marxism–Leninism adapted to the historical context of China, particularly its predominantly agrarian society. Its foundational texts include Mao's 1937 essay On Contradiction. Currently, the CCP interprets the essence of Mao Zedong Thought as "Seeking truth from facts": "we must proceed from reality and put theory into practice in everything. In other words, we must integrate the universal theory of Marxism–Leninism with China's specific conditions." "Seeking truth from facts" refers to testing theory against reality rather than dogmatically sticking to ideology. It posits that theory must meet reality, and if it does not, it should be changed.

From 1942–1944, the CCP instituted the Yan'an Rectification Movement, which sought to eliminate ideological differences among the cadres and intellectuals and to mold them into socialist new men. Following this campaign, the party's ideology consolidated around Mao Zedong's thought. The concept of the mass line developed through the movement.

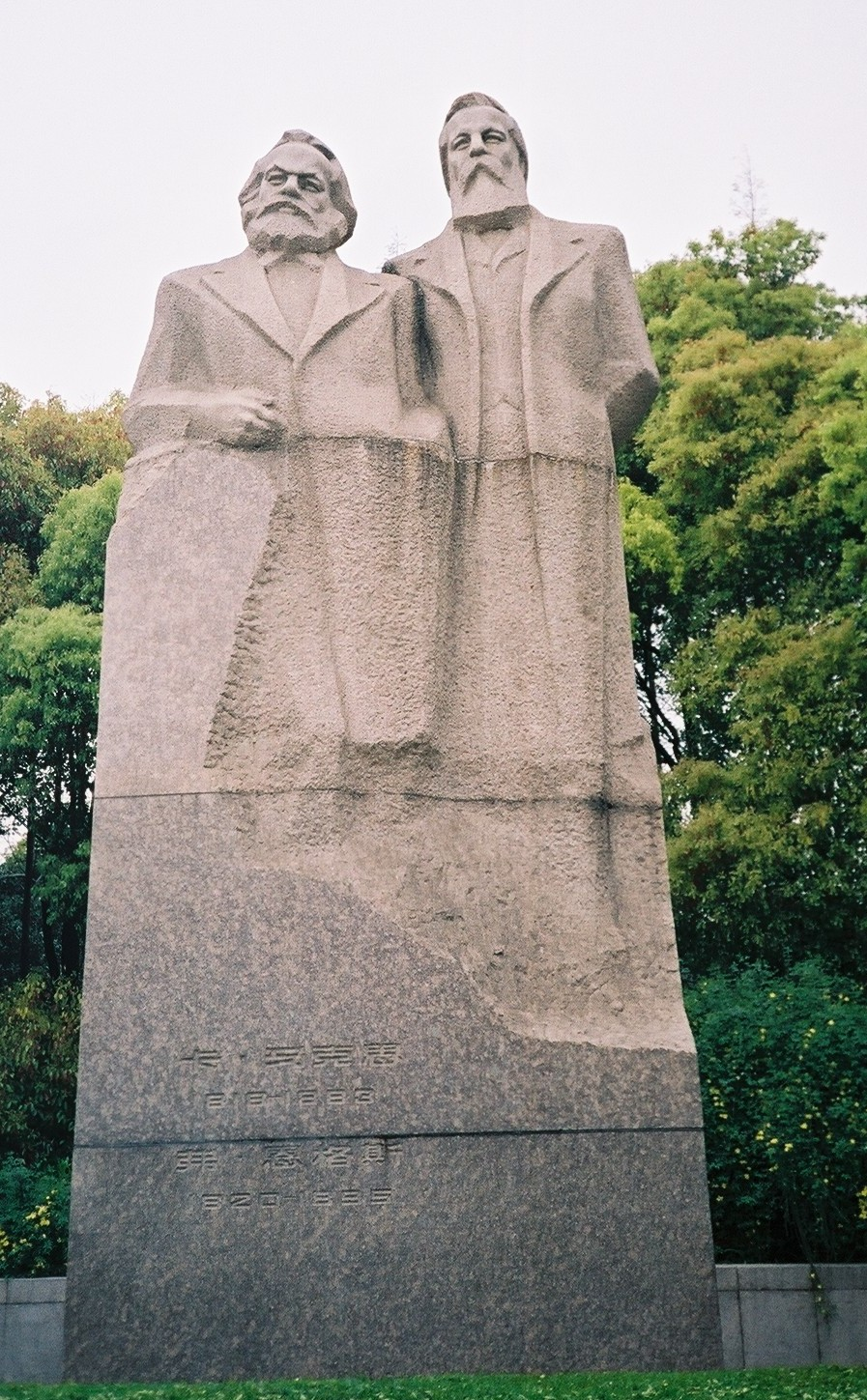
A monument dedicated to Marx (left) and Engels (right) in Shanghai, China

While analysts generally agree that the CCP has rejected orthodox Marxism–Leninism and Mao Zedong Thought (or at least basic thoughts within orthodox thinking), the CCP itself disagrees. Some Western commentators also talk about a "crisis of ideology" within the party; they believe that the CCP has rejected communism. Wang Xuedong, the director of the Institute of World Socialism, said in response, "We know there are those abroad who think we have a 'crisis of ideology,' but we do not agree." According to former CCP General Secretary Jiang Zemin, the CCP "must never discard Marxism–Leninism and Mao Zedong Thought." He said that "if we did, we would lose our foundation." He further noted that Marxism in general "like any science, needs to change as time and circumstances advance." Certain groups argue that Jiang Zemin ended the CCP's formal commitment to Marxism with the introduction of the ideological theory, the Three Represents. Party theorist Leng Rong disagrees: "President Jiang rid the Party of the ideological obstacles to different kinds of ownership [...] He did not give up Marxism or socialism. He strengthened the Party by providing a modern understanding of Marxism and socialism—which is why we talk about a 'socialist market economy' with Chinese characteristics." Marxism in its core is, according to Jiang Zemin, methodology and the goal of a future, classless society, not analyses of class and of the contradictions between different classes.

Karl Marx argued that society went through different stages of development, and believed that the capitalist mode of production was the fourth stage. The stages were: primitive communism, slavery, feudal, capitalist, socialist, and the communist mode of production. The attainment of true "communism" is described as the CCP's and China's "ultimate goal". While the CCP claims that China is in the primary stage of socialism, party theorists argue that the current development stage "looks a lot like capitalism". Alternately, certain party theorists argue that "capitalism is the early or first stage of communism." In official pronouncements, the primary stage of socialism is predicted to last about 100 years, after which China will reach another developmental stage. Some have dismissed the concept of a primary stage of socialism as intellectual cynicism. According to Robert Lawrence Kuhn, a China analyst, "When I first heard this rationale, I thought it more comic than clever—a wry caricature of hack propagandists leaked by intellectual cynics. But the 100-year horizon comes from serious political theorists".

=== Contradiction ===
The Marxist concept of contradiction is an important feature of Chinese ideological discourse. Within Marxism, a contradiction is a relationship in which two forces oppose each other, leading to mutual development. Identifying the principal contradiction in a given place and time is of particular importance to political and ideological analysis. During the Mao Zedong era, China's principal contradiction was described as the class struggle between the proletariat and the bourgeoise. As China engaged in Reform and Opening Up, Deng Xiaoping identified the principal contradiction as the contradiction between the people's growing material and cultural needs versus backwards social production. In this view, economic development replaced class struggle as the Party's central task. Xi Jinping defines China's principal contradiction as unbalanced and inadequate development versus the people's needs for a better life.

== Reform and opening up ==
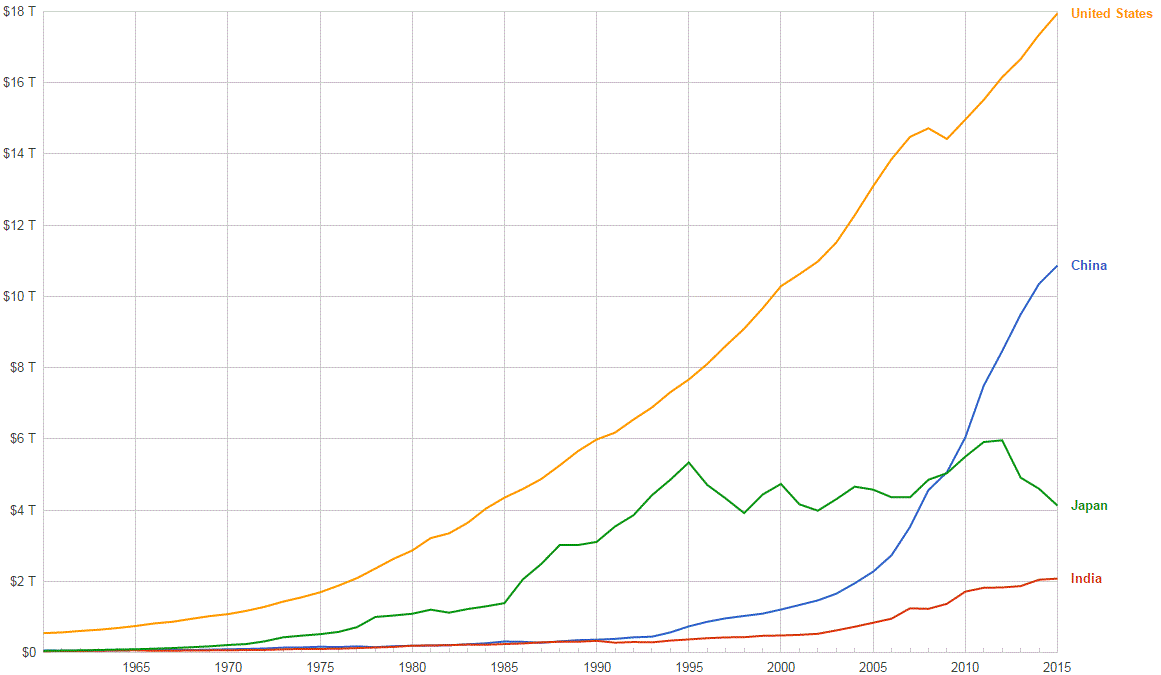
China's nominal gross domestic product (GDP) trend from 1952 to 2005

While it has been argued that the reforms introduced by the CCP under Deng were a rejection of the party's Marxist heritage and ideology, the CCP does not view it as such. The rationale behind the reforms was that the productive forces of China lagged behind the advanced culture and ideology developed by the party-state. In 1986, to end this deficiency, the CCP came to the conclusion that the main contradiction in Chinese society was that between the backward productive forces and the advanced culture and ideology of China. By doing this, they deemphasized class struggle, and contradicted both Mao and Karl Marx, who both considered that class struggle was the main focus of the communist movement. According to this logic, thwarting the CCP's goal of advancing productive forces was synonymous with class struggle. The classical goal of class struggle was declared by Deng to have been achieved in 1976. While Mao had also emphasized the need to develop productive forces, under Deng it became paramount.

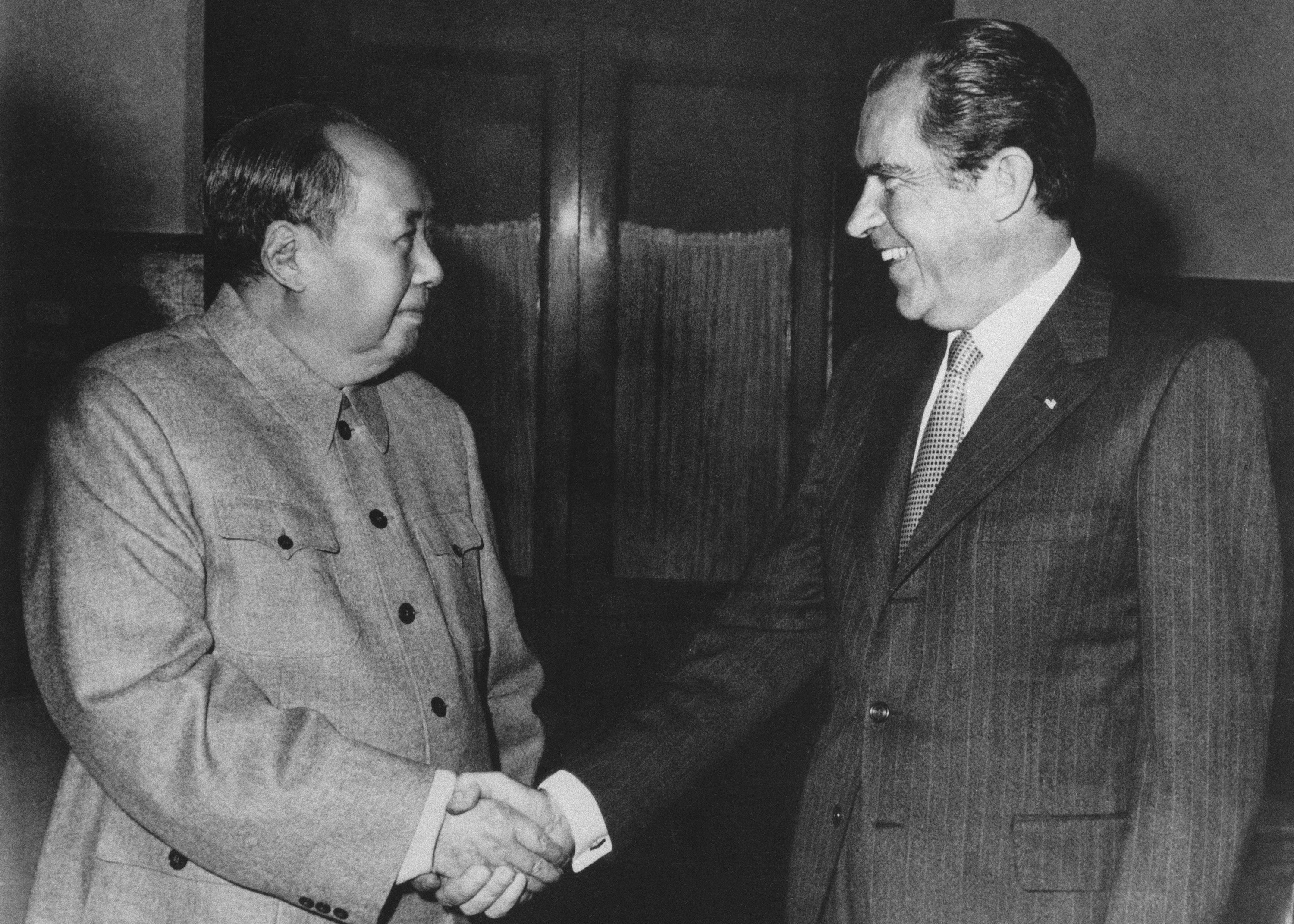
Mao Zedong (left) meets with Richard Nixon, the President of the United States, on 21 February 1972.

Some have likened the CCP's position under Deng to that of the Communist Party of the Soviet Union under Joseph Stalin when he introduced the planned economy. Adrian Chan, the author of Chinese Marxism, opposes this view: "To Stalin, the development of productive forces was the prerequisite for the Soviet Union to become communist." He further argues that such a view does not make sense in light of the different situations; Stalin emphasized production because of the Soviet Union's backwardness in all areas, while in China, the reforms were seen as one way to further develop the productive forces. These interpretations, while not in agreement, shed light on the fact that Chinese socialism did change during the Deng era. In 1987, the Beijing Review stated that the achievements of socialism were "evaluated according to the level of the productive forces".

CCP theoretician and former Politburo member Hu Qiaomu in his thesis "Observe economic laws, speed up the Four Modernizations", published in 1978, argued that economic laws were objective, on par with natural laws. He insisted that economic laws were no more negotiable "than the law of gravity". Hu's conclusion was that the party was responsible for the socialist economy's acting on these economic laws. He believed that only an economy based on the individual would satisfy these laws, since "such an economy would be in accord with the productive forces". The CCP followed his line, and at the 12th National Congress, the party constitution was amended, stating that the private economy was a "needed complement to the socialist economy". This sentiment was echoed by Xue Muqiao; "practice shows that socialism is not necessarily based on a unified public ownership by the whole society".

During the reform and opening up, Deng criticized those he deemed as the ideologues of the Cultural Revolution for seeking "poor socialism" and "poor communism" and believing that communism was a "spiritual thing". In 1979, Deng stated, "Socialism cannot endure if it remains poor. If we want to uphold Marxism and socialism in the international class struggle, we have to demonstrate that the Marxist system of thought is superior to all others, and that the socialist system is superior to capitalism".

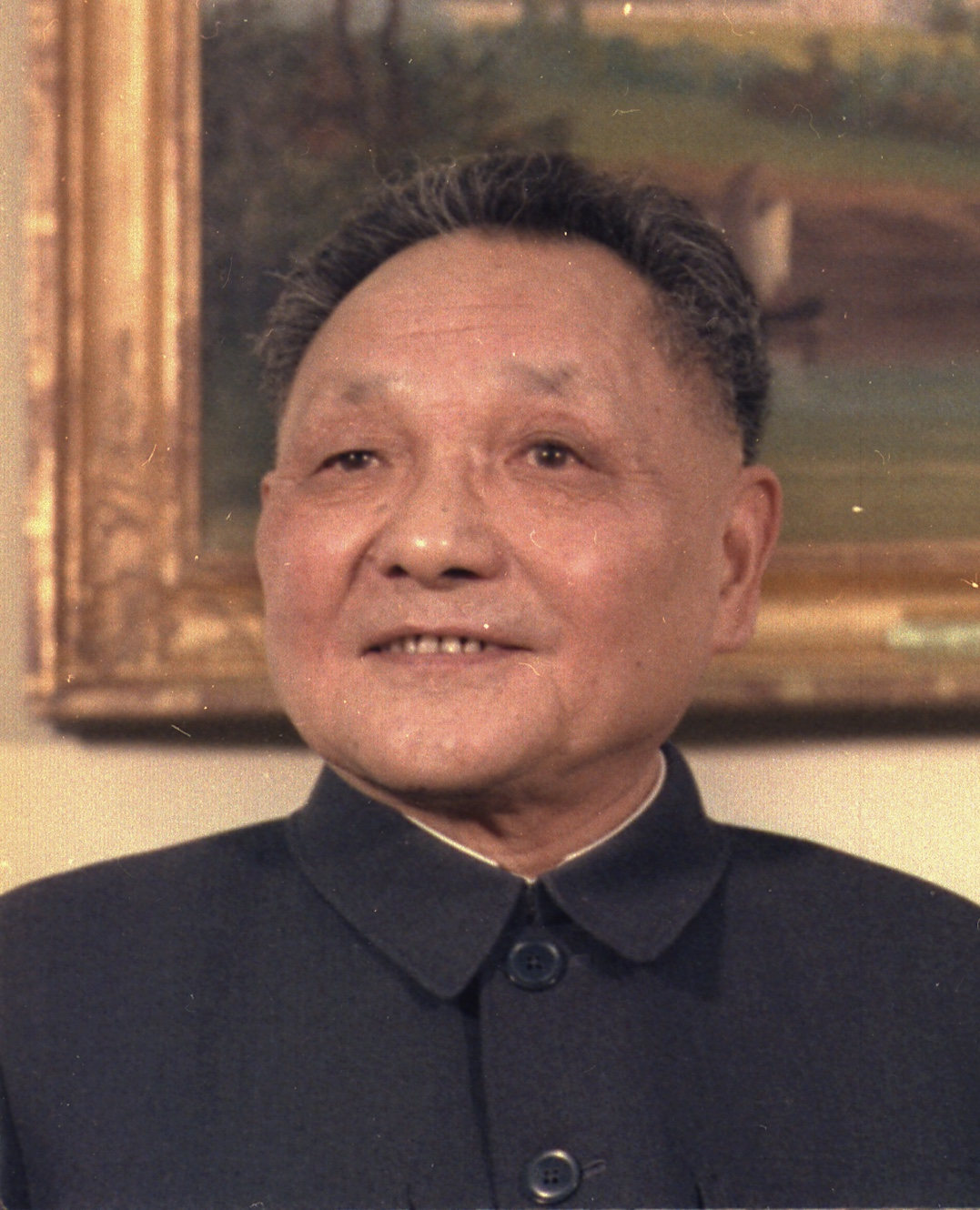
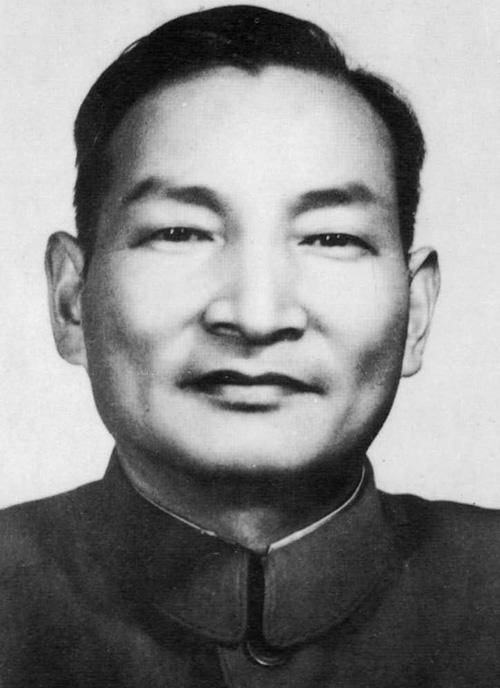
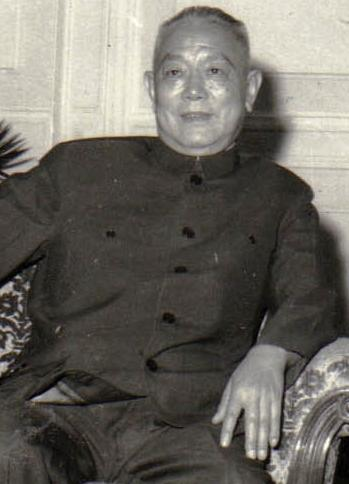
Reform and opening up would not have been introduced if not for the work of Deng Xiaoping (left), Chen Yun (center) and Li Xiannian (right). The relationship between Deng Xiaoping, Chen Yun and Li Xiannian, was described as "two and a half" in the 1980s; with Chen being considered roughly as Deng's equal, and with Li Xiannian "being half a step behind".

The official communiqué of the 3rd plenum of the 11th Central Committee included the words: "integrate the universal principles of Marxism–Leninism–Mao Zedong Thought with the concrete practice of socialist modernization and develop it under the new historical conditions". With the words "new historical conditions", the CCP had in fact made it possible to view the old, Maoist ideology as obsolete (or at least certain tenets). To know if a policy was obsolete or not, the party had to "seek truth from facts" and follow the slogan "practice is the sole criterion of the truth". At the 6th plenum of the 11th Central Committee, the Resolution on Certain Questions in the History of Our Party since the Founding of the People's Republic of China was adopted. The resolution separated Mao the person from Mao Zedong Thought, claiming that Mao had contravened Mao Zedong Thought during his rule. While the document criticized Mao, it clearly stated that he was a "proletarian revolutionary" and that without Mao there would have been no new China. Su Shaozi, a party theoretician and the head of the Institute of Marxism–Leninism–Mao Zedong Thought, argued that the CCP needed to reassess the New Economic Policy introduced by Vladimir Lenin and ended by Stalin, as well as Stalin's industrialization policies and the prominent role he gave to class struggle. Su claimed that the "exploiting classes in China had been eliminated". Dong Fureng, a deputy director at the Institute of Economics, agreed with the reformist discourse, first by criticizing Marx and Friedrich Engels' view that a socialist society had to abolish private property, and secondly, accusing both Marx and Engels for being vague on what kind of ownership of the means of production was necessary in socialist society. While both Su and Dong agreed that it was the collectivization of agriculture and the establishment of People's Communes which had ended rural exploitation, neither of them sought a return to collectivized agriculture.

In 1983, the concept of eliminating spiritual pollution became important in Party rhetoric and addressed through the Campaign against spiritual pollution. In 1986, the focus shifted to eliminating "bourgeois liberalization". The terms "spiritual pollution" and "bourgeois liberalization" did not have consensus definitions, and different elements of the Party used them differently to characterize behaviour they deemed ideologically unacceptable.

=== Socialist market economy ===
The term "socialism with Chinese characteristics" was added to the CCP's constitution at the 12th National Congress, without a definition of the term. At the 13th National Congress, held in 1987, Zhao Ziyang, the CCP General Secretary, claimed that socialism with Chinese characteristics was the "integration of the fundamental tenets of Marxism with the modernization drive in China" and was "scientific socialism rooted in the realities of present-day China". By this time the CCP believed that China was in the primary stage of socialism, and therefore needed market relations to develop into a socialist society. Two years earlier, Su had tried to internationalize the term "primary stage of socialism" by claiming that socialism contained three different production phases. China was currently in the first phase, while the Soviet Union and the remaining Eastern Bloc countries were in the second phase. Because China was in the primary stage of socialism, Zhao argued that in "[China] for a long time to come, we shall develop various sectors of the economy, always ensuring the dominant position of the public sector". Further, some individuals should be allowed to become rich "before the objective of common prosperity [pure communism] is achieved". Lastly, during the primary stage of socialism, planning would no longer be the primary means of organization of the economy. Upon hearing this remark, Chen Yun, a cautious reformer and the second-most powerful politician in China, walked out of the meeting.

Why do people support us? Because over the last ten years our economy has been developing ... If the economy stagnated for five years or developed at only a slow rate – for example, at 4 or 5 percent, or even 2 or 3 percent—what effects would be produced? This would be not only an economic problem but also a political one.

— Deng Xiaoping during a conversation with Yang Shangkun and Premier Li in 1990.

Both Chen Yun and Deng supported the formation of a private market. At the 8th National Congress, Chen first proposed an economy where the socialist sector would be dominant, with the private economy in a secondary role. He believed that by following the "Ten Major Relationships", an article by Mao on how to proceed with socialist construction, the CCP could remain on the socialist road while also supporting private property. Chen Yun conceived of the bird-cage theory, where the bird represents the free market and the cage represents a central plan. Chen proposed that a balance should be found between "setting the bird free" and choking the bird with a central plan that was too restrictive.

Between the time of the 13th National Congress and the 1989 Tiananmen Square protests and massacre, the line between right and left within the CCP became clearer. The rift became visible in the run-up to the 7th plenum of the 13th National Congress (in 1990), when problems arose concerning China's 8th Five-Year Plan. The draft for the 8th Five-Year Plan, supervised by Premier Li Peng and Deputy Premier Yao Yilin, openly endorsed Chen Yun's economic view that planning should be primary, coupled with slow, balanced growth. Li went further and directly contradicted Deng, stating, "Reform and opening up should not be taken as the guiding principle; instead, sustained, steady, and coordinated development should be taken as the guiding principle." Deng retaliated by rejecting the Draft for the 8th Five-Year Plan, claiming that the 1990s was the "best time" for continuing with reform and opening up. Li and Yao even went so far as to try to annul two key resolutions passed by the 13th National Congress: the theory of socialist political civilization, and the resolution that central planning and markets were equals. Deng rejected the idea of reopening discussions on these subjects, and restated that reforms were essential for the CCP's future. Not accepting Deng's stance, party theorist Deng Liqun, along with others, began promoting "Chen Yun Thought". After a discussion with General Wang Zhen, a supporter of Chen Yun, Deng stated he would propose the abolishment of the Central Advisory Commission (CAC). Chen Yun retaliated by naming Bo Yibo to succeed him as CAC chairman. Indeed, when the 7th plenum of the 13th Central Committee did in fact convene, nothing notable took place, with both sides trying not to widen the ideological gap even further. The resolution of the 7th plenum did contain a great deal of ideological language ("firmly follow the road of socialism with Chinese characteristics"), but no clear formulation of new policy was uttered.

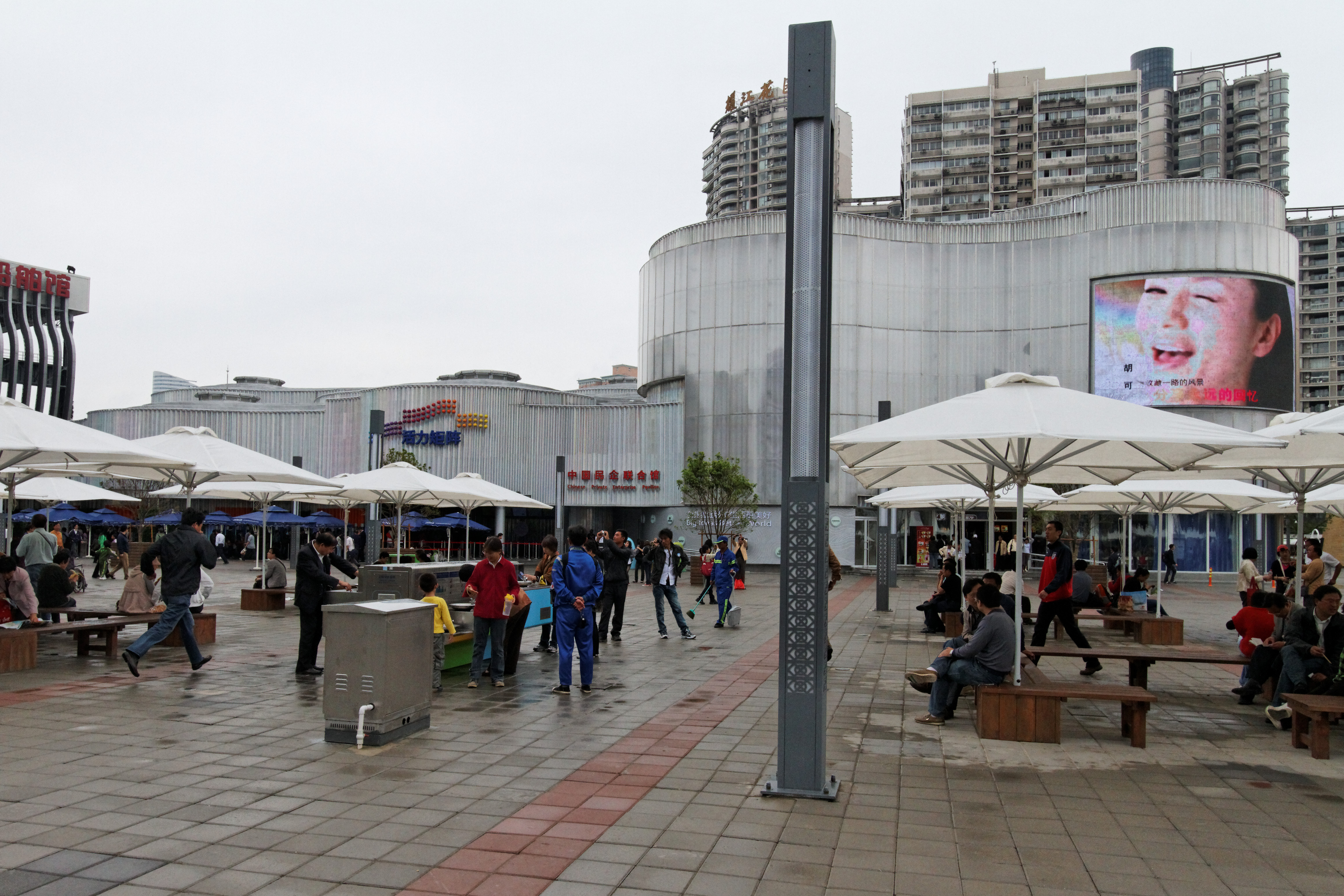
Private ownership of the means of productions were allowed as a result of the reforms.

Chen Yun's thoughts and policies dominated CCP discourse from 1989 until Deng's southern tour in 1992. Deng began campaigning for his reformist policies in 1991, managing to get reformist articles printed in the People's Daily and People's Liberation Army Daily during this period. The articles criticized those communists who believed that central planning and market economics were polar opposites, instead repeating the Dengist mantra that planning and markets were only two different ways in which to regulate economic activity. By that time, the party had begun preparing for the 14th National Congress. Deng threatened to withdraw his support for Jiang Zemin's reelection as CCP General Secretary if Jiang did not accept reformist policies. At the 8th plenum of the 13th Central Committee, in 1991, the conservatives still held the upper hand within the party leadership.

To reassert his economic agenda, in the spring of 1992, Deng made his famous southern tour of China, visiting Guangzhou, Shenzhen, and Zhuhai, and spending the New Year in Shanghai. He used his travels to reassert his economic policy ideas after his retirement from office. On the tour, Deng made many speeches and generated large local support for his reformist platform. He stressed the importance of economic reform in China, and criticized those who were against further reform and opening up. The tour proved that amongst the party's grassroots organizations, support for reform and opening up was firm. Because of this, more and more leading members of the central party leadership converted to Deng's position, amongst them Jiang Zemin. In his speech "Deeply Understand and Implement Comrade Deng Xiaoping's Important Spirit, Make Economic Construction, Reform and Opening Go Faster and Better" to the Central Party School, Jiang said it did not matter if a certain mechanism was capitalist or socialist, the key question was whether it worked. Jiang's speech is notable since it introduced the term socialist market economy, which replaced Chen Yun's "planned socialist market economy". In a later Politburo meeting, members voted unanimously, in old communist fashion, to continue with reform and opening up. Knowing that he had lost, Chen Yun gave in, and claimed that because of new conditions, the old techniques of the planned economy were outdated.

At the 14th National Congress, the thought of Deng Xiaoping was officially dubbed Deng Xiaoping Theory. It is described as a development of Marxism and Mao Zedong Thought. The concepts of "socialism with Chinese characteristics" and "the primary stage of socialism" were credited to Deng. At the congress, Jiang reiterated Deng's view that it was unnecessary to ask if something was socialist or capitalist, since the important factor was whether it worked. Several capitalist techniques were introduced, while science and technology were to be the primary productive force.

== 21st century ==
=== Three Represents ===
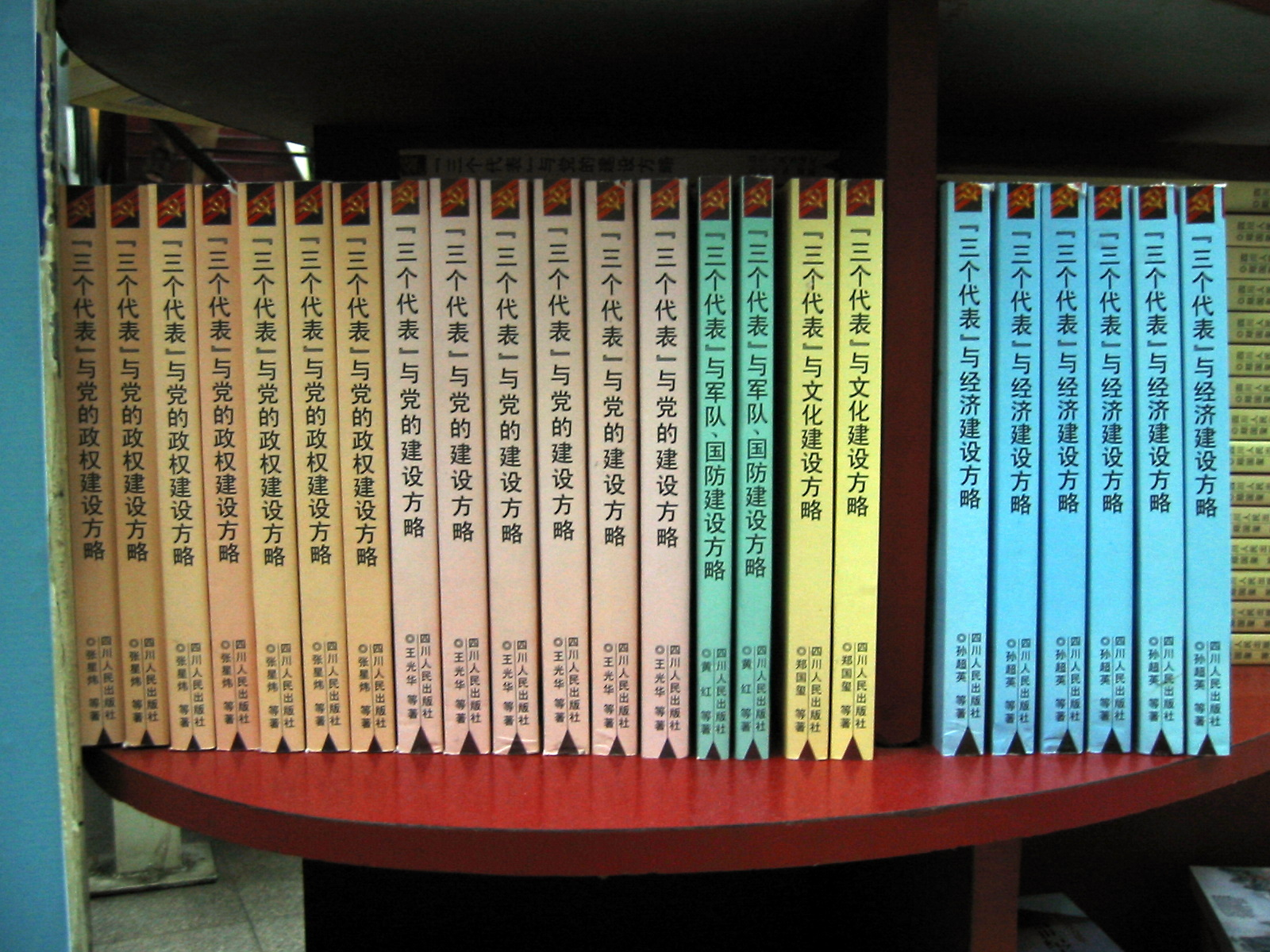
Numerous books (as seen in the picture) about the Three Represents have been published.

The term ″Three Represents″ was first used in 2000 by Jiang Zemin in a trip to Guangdong province. From then until its inclusion in the party's constitution at the 16th National Congress, the Three Represents became a constant theme for Jiang Zemin. In his speech at the anniversary of the founding of the People's Republic of China, Jiang Zemin said that "[The CCP] must always represent the development trend of China's advanced productive forces, the orientation of China's advanced culture, and the fundamental interests of the overwhelming majority of the people in China." By this time, Jiang and the CCP had reached the conclusion that attaining the communist mode of production, as formulated by earlier communists, was more complex than had been realized, and that it was useless to try to force a change in the mode of production, as it had to develop naturally, by following historical materialism. While segments within the CCP criticized the Three Represents as being un-Marxist and a betrayal of basic Marxist values, supporters viewed it as a further development of socialism with Chinese characteristics. The theory is most notable for allowing capitalists, officially referred to as the "new social strata", to join the party on the grounds that they engaged in "honest labor and work" and through their labour contributed "to build[ing] socialism with Chinese characteristics." Jiang contended that capitalists should be able to join the party on the grounds that;

It is not advisable to judge a person's political orientation simply by whether he or she owns property or how much property he or she owns [...] Rather, we should judge him or her mainly by his or her political awareness, moral integrity and performance, by how he or she has acquired the property, how it has been disposed of and used, and by his or her actual contribution to the cause of building socialism with Chinese characteristics.

=== Scientific Outlook on Development ===
The Scientific Outlook on Development (Note: 科学发展观; sometimes translated to either the scientific development concept, or as the scientific development perspective.) is a political doctrine of the Chinese Communist Party (CCP), credited to former Chinese leader Hu Jintao and his administration, who was in power from 2002 to 2012. The Scientific Outlook on Development incorporates scientific socialism, sustainable development, social welfare, a humanistic society, increased democracy, and, ultimately, the creation of a Socialist Harmonious Society. According to official statements by the CCP, the concept integrates "Marxism with the reality of contemporary China and with the underlying features of our times, and it fully embodies the Marxist worldview on and methodology for development."

=== Xi Jinping Thought ===
Xi Jinping Thought on Socialism with Chinese Characteristics for a New Era, commonly abbreviated outside China as Xi Jinping Thought or Xi-ism, is a political doctrine created during the general secretaryship of Xi Jinping of the Chinese Communist Party (CCP).

== Views on capitalism ==
[...] their theory that capitalism is the ultimate has been shaken, and socialist development has experienced a miracle. Western capitalism has suffered reversals, a financial crisis, a credit crisis, a crisis of confidence, and their self-conviction has wavered. Western countries have begun to reflect, and openly or secretively compare themselves against China's politics, economy and path.

— Xi Jinping, the CCP General Secretary, on the inevitability of socialism.

The CCP does not believe that it has abandoned Marxism. The party views the world as organized into two opposing camps; socialist and capitalist. The Party's view is that socialism, on the basis of historical materialism, will eventually triumph over capitalism. In recent years, when the CCP has been asked to explain the capitalist globalization occurring, the party has returned to the writings of Karl Marx. Marx wrote that capitalists, in their search for profit, would travel the world in a bid to establish new international markets – hence, it is generally assumed that Marx forecasted globalization. His writings on the subject are used to justify the CCP's market reforms, since nations, according to Marx, have little choice in the matter of joining or not. Opting not to take part in capitalist globalization means losing out in the fields of economic development, technological development, foreign investment and world trade. This view is strengthened by the economic failures of the Soviet Union and of China under Mao.

Despite admitting that globalization developed through the capitalist system, the CCP's leaders and theorists argue that globalization is not intrinsically capitalist, the reason being that, if globalization were purely capitalist, it would exclude an alternate socialist form of modernity. Globalization, as with the market economy, therefore does not have one specific class character (either socialist or capitalist) according to the party. The instance that globalization is not fixed in nature, comes from Deng's insistence that China can pursue socialist modernization by incorporating elements of capitalism. Because of this there is considerable optimism within the CCP that despite the current capitalist dominance of globalization, globalization can be turned into a vehicle supporting socialism. This event will occur through capitalism's own contradictions. These contradictions are, according to party theorist Yue Yi from the Academy of Social Sciences, "that between private ownership of the means of production and socialized production. This contradiction has manifested itself globally as the following contradictions; the contradiction between planned and regulated national economies and the unplanned and unregulated world economy; the contradiction between well-organized and scientifically managed Transnational Corporations (TNCs) and a blindly expanding and chaotic world market; the contradiction between the unlimited increase of productive capacity and the limited world market; and the contradiction between sovereign states and TNCs." It was these contradictions, argues Yue Yi, that led to the dot-com bubble of the 1990s, that has caused unbalanced development and polarization, and widened the gap between rich and poor. These contradictions will lead to the inevitable demise of capitalism and the resultant dominance of socialism. CCP International Department Head Liu Haixing wrote in 2026 that "frequent systemic crises within capitalism" and the success of the Chinese model means that "historical evolution and the competition between the two ideologies and social systems — socialism and capitalism — are undergoing a major shift on a global scale that increasingly favors socialism".

== Concepts ==
=== People's democratic dictatorship ===
In 2007, Hu Jintao noted in a speech that "people's democracy is the lifeblood of socialism ... without democracy there can be no socialism, and there can be no socialist modernization." Democracy, in the CCP's understanding of the word, does not mean democracy as practiced in liberal democracies. Instead it means the creation of a more balanced, equal society, "with socialism bringing about social justice. The CCP still believes that it leads through the unity of the peasant and working classes. Stability is needed for the further development of democracy and socialism.

Democracy as interpreted in capitalist societies is the democracy of the bourgeoisie, in reality, it is a monopolized democracy, and is nothing more than multi-party competitive elections, a tripartite separation of powers and a bicameral system. Our system is the system of the People's Congresses, it is the people's democracy system under the leadership of the Communist Party, we cannot do those Western ways.

— Deng Xiaoping, the CCP paramount leader, on importing bourgeois/liberal democracy to China.

Yang Xiaoqing in the article "A Comparative Study of Constitutional Governance and the People's Democratic Regime", published in the CCP's theoretical journal Qiushi in 2013, argues that the people's democratic dictatorship and Western constitutional government are mutually exclusive. She notes, in line with classical Marxist theory, that constitutionalism in general fits with the capitalist mode of production and bourgeois democracy, and does not fit in with China's socialist system of people's democratic dictatorship. Constitutional government has a market economy in which private property plays the predominant role, as the basis unlike the Chinese socialist market economy in which public ownership is the basis. The rallying cries of the liberal revolutions in the 17th and 18th century she notes was "Private property is sacred and inviolable, and constitutional governance was established around this premise. While things have changed since the 17th and 18th centuries the basic premise remains the same in Western societies; a small government which protects the interests of private property.

==== People's democracy versus parliamentary democracy ====
In fact, there is only concrete freedom in the world, and concrete democracy, there is no abstract freedom or abstract democracy. In class struggle societies, where there is the freedom for the exploiting classes to exploit the labouring people, there is no freedom for the labouring people to be free from exploitation. Where there is bourgeois democracy, there is no democracy of the proletariat or the working people. [...] democracy and freedom are relative, not absolute, they all occur and develop in history

— Mao Zedong

Yang states that people's democracy, unlike parliamentary democracy, realizes the principle of "popular sovereignty". The basis for the argument is that in a parliamentary democracy, a system in which ordinary people can vote for different parties, the parties available are in the pockets of the bourgeoisie. Parties can only win, Yang claims, if they have enough money—when parties have money, they get it from the bourgeoisie. This relationship turns the political parties contesting the election to subservient tools of the bourgeoisie, and makes them govern in their interest. While a system with multi-party elections, rotational government and parliaments looks more democratic, it is in fact beholden to the interests of the bourgeoisie, and not the people. In contrast, the people's democratic system with People's Congresses realizes popular sovereignty through a mixture electoral and consultative democracy. Unlike in parliamentary democracies, Yang adds, people standing for elections for seats in people's congresses are state financed, thus giving every candidate an equal chance of getting elected. Yang claims that;

All political parties [in China] bear the trust of the people, all implement their duties according to the law and under the leadership of the Communist Party, and serve the people.

In a parliamentary democracy, the only way for a party to gain legitimacy is through elections, but due to the involvement of the bourgeoisie in the election process this legitimacy is not considered as genuine. The CCP gained legitimacy, Yang asserts, through its victory in the "Chinese democratic revolution". Yang claims that the introduction of constitutionalism in any form would lead to the fall of the CCP, and even claims that socialist constitutionalism of the Soviet Union and the former socialist states was a main factor contributing to their downfall.

While not writing negatively about the system of checks and balances as it exists in the United States, Yang claims that the people's congress system of "one governments and two courts" (the institutions of the People's Courts and the People's Procuratorates) is the best suited for Chinese conditions, since it is "the best form to reflect our country's national essence." In the people's democratic system, the courts are both responsible to and supervised by the people's congresses. In this system, Yang adds, the judiciary is under the control of the National People's Congress (NPC) and its Standing Committee (SC). The NPC (or the SC), are responsible for supervising the implementation of the constitution, and judicial organs are granted judicial independence (through their respective people's congresses). These courts are not subject to interference by groups or individuals and are solely responsible to the people's congresses at their respective level. As Yang puts it;

Accordingly, our country's judicial organs, both trial organs and procuratorial organs, shall implement their powers independently according to the provisions of the law, but in terms of politics, ideology and organization, they must be under the leadership of the Communist Party of China. The Socialist rule of law concept is persisting in 'governing the country according to the law, a judiciary for the people, fairness and justice, serving the bigger picture, and the leadership of the Party.'

Similarly Yang rejects the constitutionalist notion that the military is to be neutral and nationalized under the control of civilian politician. Since it was established by the CCP, and given its role in the victory against the Kuomintang, the People's Liberation Army (PLA) is unique and should be treated as such.

==== Socialist democracy ====
The CCP styles itself as a socialist democracy. In the article "Marxism is a Universal Truth, not a 'Universal Value'" (published in Party Building in 2013) Wang Ningyou states that democracy is not a universal value since the meaning of democracy (and how it should work) changes from which class perspective one has. He claims that the two main forms of democracy, socialist democracy (proletarian democracy) and capitalist democracy (bourgeoisie democracy) are both diametrically opposite; socialist democracy allows the people to master their own affairs while capitalist democracy, Wang contends, "guarantees the freedom of capital to exploit and suppress [the masses/proletariat]". The use of qualifiers in front of the word of democracy is important as to highlight the class nature of the different forms of democracy Wang contends, and concludes that "One sort of pure democracy, common democracy or 'universal democracy' that all of humanity identifies with has never existed in human societies".

==== Opposition to constitutionalism ====
Yang rejects the notion that constitutionalism "is a good word", and rejects the introduction of the term "socialist constitutional governance" (or another formulation of it) into Chinese ideological discourse. Constitutionalism, Yang believes, has discourse hegemony since it is backed by the bourgeoisie. Similarly to Engels' and Vladimir Lenin's conclusions (among others), Yang concludes that constitutional systems are ruled by property relations which gives the bourgeoisie considerable control. In The Condition of the Working Class in England Engels' states (a position which is still endorsed by the CCP);

Free competition will suffer no limitation, no State supervision; the whole State is but a burden to it. It would reach its highest perfection in a wholly ungoverned anarchic society, where each might exploit the other to his hearts content. [...] However, the bourgeoisie cannot dispense with government, but must have it to hold the equally indispensable proletariat in check, it turns the power of government against the proletariat and keeps out of its way as far as possible.

Constitutionalism, and liberal democracy in general (which is continuously referred to as the "dictatorship of the bourgeoisie" in the article), can be considered "superficial" Yang argues, since the bourgeoisie are the only one access to true liberty and democracy. Yang notes that "constitutional governance asserts that power lies in the people, and implements a parliamentary democratic political system. But the real operation of parliamentary democracies is completely grasped in the hands of the bourgeoisie." Members of parliament (or officials in general) are able to contest elections (and win them) only with the support of the bourgeoisie. He goes on to claim that the elected officials of democratic states fool the people; they pretend to serve the people, "but in reality, they dominate and plunder citizens". Yang shares Karl Marx's sentiment that liberal democracy "permits the oppressed to decide once every few years on which persons from the oppressive class will be represented in parliament to oppress them!" The Chinese system is based on Marx's own writings, who writes in The Civil War in France that "Communes shall not have a parliamentary form, and shall be organs combining executive and legislative work at the same time." The whole points of these elected assemblies are that the people elected to the assemblies are responsible for implementing and supervising laws.

Wang contends that the fixed class nature of constitutionalism is bourgeoisie. While there are some who try to separate constitutionalism from the Western capitalist system, Wang argues, by doing so they are only safeguarding the rights of the bourgeoisie and their "universal values". According to Wang, constitutionalism is used as a tool by the ruling class (the bourgeoisie) to oppress the labouring masses (the proletariat). Wang reiterates Mao's position of "constitutionalism, or what is called democratic politics, in fact is a politics that eats people." Wang concludes his remarks on constitutionalism by claiming that "it is [...] necessary to sweep this [concept] into the rubbish bin of history".

==== Promotion of ideology ====
Anne Applebaum of The Atlantic writes that as of 2024 the promotion of the rule and ideology of the CCP (an important part of Communist rule) has changed markedly from the 20th century. Initially propaganda was Based on Joseph Stalin's practice in the Soviet Union and designed to project a "shiny and idealized" of China's future, generating "enthusiasm, inspiration, and hope" among the population with massive military parades and images of "clean factories, abundant produce, and healthy tractor drivers with large muscles and square jaws". These campaigns had the disadvantage of allowing the public to compare what they saw on posters and in movies with the less than ideal reality. In the 21st century, idealism and the goal of Communist utopia was replaced in state propaganda with a focus on undermining the capitalist/democratic ideological competition, and convincing the Chinese public that "there is no democratic alternative" to authoritarian rule — a particular concern of the party after the 1989 Tiananmen Square protests and massacre. It promoted cynicism and strove to convince the public to "stay out of politics". Communist utopianism was replaced in positive propaganda, Applebaum argues, with nationalist pride in (the reality of) China's economic development, and contrasted its "model of development based on dictatorship and 'order'" with the alleged "chaos and violence" of the democratic world.

=== Socialist civilization ===
The term "civilization" (文明; Wenming) became a key word during the 1990s. In short, the ideological campaigns tried to harmonize the relationship between the "two civilizations" in China – "material civilization and spiritual civilization". The concept first developed during the early 1980s from classical Marxist thought. It was through this concept that the CCP called for "balanced development". "Material civilization" is synonymous with economic development; "spiritual civilization", often referred to as socialist spiritual civilization, tries to spread good socialist morals in Chinese society. Under Deng, the CCP emphasized material civilization, but under Jiang the emphasis was on spiritual civilization, which was less easily definable. "Spiritual civilization" changed from a concept largely defined in socialist terminology under Deng into a vehicle for cultural nationalism under Jiang. The theory has become more complex with time; at the 16th National Congress Jiang introduced a third concept of civilization, "political civilization", focused solely on the CCP and political reform.

The state strengthens the building of socialist spiritual civilization by promoting education in high ideals, ethics, general knowledge, discipline and legality, and by promoting the formulation and observance of rules of conduct and common pledges by various sections of the people in urban and rural areas.

The state advocates the civic virtues of love for the motherland, for the people, for labor, for science and for socialism. It conducts education among the people in patriotism and collectivism, in internationalism and communism and in dialectical and historical materialism, to combat capitalist, feudalist and other decadent ideas.

— Article 25 of the state constitution.

Deng first used the term in 1979, to denote the need to develop a material civilization as well as a spiritual civilization. Analyst Nicholas Dynon believes it may have been introduced to placate the conservatives within the CCP, Deng's way of reassuring them that socialism was not being abandoned. "Socialist civilization" was to replace class struggle as the main engine of progress, a worldview seen as more harmonious and cooperative. "Socialist Spiritual Civilization" was launched in the early 1980s to protect the party from foreign, corruptive influences but also to protect the CCP's policy of reform and opening up. While the two terms, "material" and "spiritual" civilizations, were added to the party constitution at the 12th National Congress, the terms and their meanings were hotly debated. For instance, Zhao Yiya, the editor-in-chief of the Liberation Army Press, criticized Hua Yaobang's speech to the 12th National Congress, noting that both material and spiritual elements contained "class character" as well as cultural elements. Material civilization was less contested, and it maintained close links to the Marxist view of economic development and the mode of productions, and the view that the material is the basis of the superstructure. On this, Deng was a classical Marxist who believed that the material served as the basis; "when people's material wealth progresses, their cultural aspects will rise as well [and] their spiritual aspects will change considerably". Under the banner of spiritual civilization, the CCP would promote patriotic spirit, collectivism and the four haves. By the mid-1980s, Deng became concerned that material civilization was getting more attention than spiritual civilization; he said "the one is tough [material civilization] while the other is soft [spiritual civilization]." The 6th plenary meeting of the 12th Central Committee adopted the "Resolutions on the guiding principles for developing a Socialist Spiritual Civilization" under the slogan "In grasping with two hands, both hands must be firm". Deng's Spiritual Civilization continued using much of the old Maoist vocabulary and slogans, such as "five stresses, four goods and three loves", "study Lei Feng" and "serve the people". In a radical break from the past, Deng ended the Maoist emphasis on antagonism and contradiction in Chinese socialist thought.

At the 16th National Congress, Jiang introduced a third kind of civilization, political civilization, along with the Three Represents. According to Robert Lawrence Kuhn, a former advisor to the Chinese government, the idea was "three interrelated objectives — material civilization, spiritual civilization, and political civilization — and one unifying mechanism, Three Represents. The three civilizations were the intended ends, and the important thought of Three Represents was the chosen means." There has been talk of introducing a fourth civilization, but nothing has come of it yet. A proposed fourth civilization, social civilization, is linked to Hu's concept of Harmonious Socialist Society. According to Lie Zhongjie, the deputy director of the Central Research Office, "the outcome of building 'society' in a general sense ... is 'social civilization' ... it is a social civilization in the broad sense, transcending the [other] three civilizations". Social civilization has not been elevated to the same level as the other three kinds of civilization. There are a number of proponents in China for "ecological civilization", "an unsurprising development given the growing awareness and official recognition of China's pressing environmental issues."

=== Socialist modernization ===
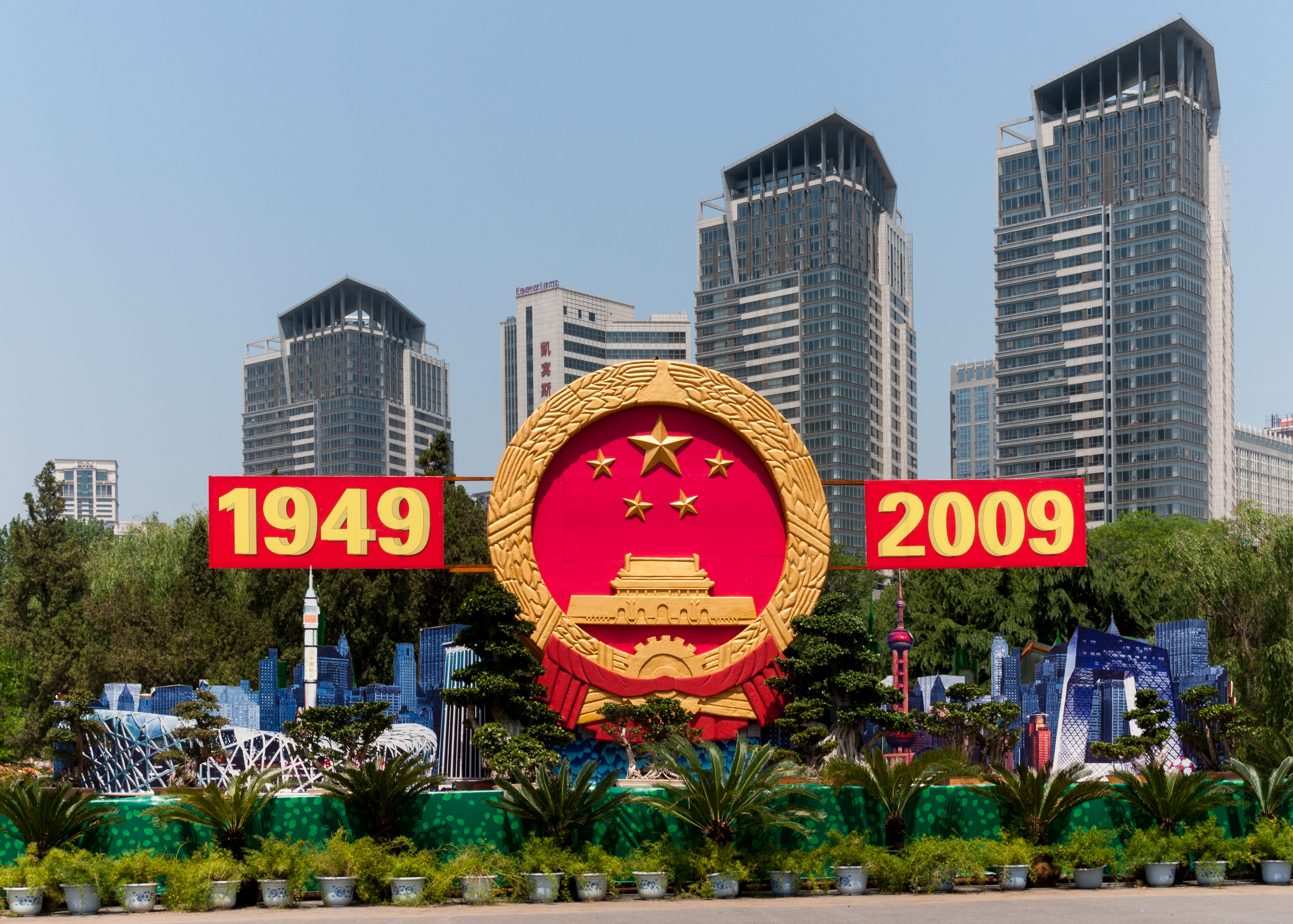
A billboard during the preparations for the celebration of the 60th anniversary of the People's Republic of China

Throughout the 20th century, ideology served two functions: first, to achieve the modernization of China, and second, to provide unity where there was fragmentation and struggle. The thought most linked to modernity in early China was Marxism, which analysed different social structures and relations. Mao conceived a Chinese version of Marxism, in which a proletarian revolution was amended to a peasant-dominated revolution. This change gave traction to a utopian modernist view and led to the Chinese Communist Revolution in 1949. The immediate post-1949 consensus was intimately linked with the idea of an "alternative modernity that transcended capitalist modernity and its Eurocentric assumptions of historical teleology and economist determinism." The impact of this was in two key areas: the introduction of Marxist terms such as proletariat, bourgeoisie, petit bourgeoisie, capitalist to denote class, for Mao's emphasis class struggle in Chinese society, and the creation of the party-state.

The Maoist vision of modernity never "enjoyed entire hegemony" within the party, and was always contested even at the height of Mao's power. Zhou Enlai's launching of the Four Modernizations in 1965 (and again 1975) are an example of this. When Mao died, the Four Modernizations replaced class struggle as the party's key objective. This vision eventually led to the enfranchisement of the private market economy and the establishment of new institutions, and became Deng Xiaoping's "socialism with Chinese characteristics". This in turn led to the adoption of alternative visions of modernity popular in the Western world. Ideological change led to factional strife, with many leading members of the party calling for a return to the classical socialist model of development. From the outside world these changes may seem odd: a society which looks more capitalist by the day is still ruled by a party that claims "fidelity to socialism". There is "less understanding of how this looks from within". A break with the basic tenets of Maoist thought came in the 1990s, when Jiang Zemin talked of the need to let private entrepreneurs join the party. This decision had a stronger connection to realpolitik then to ideological conviction. By the 16th National Congress, the private sector was one of the most dominant forces in society, a constituency the party could not ignore if it wished to hold on to power.

The party is, in official discourse, directly linked to modernity. For instance, in Hu's speech commemorating the 85th anniversary of the CCP's founding, he said, "Only our Party can become the nucleus of power to lead the Chinese revolution, construction, and reform, only it is able to bear the great trust of the Chinese people and the Chinese nationality ... In the last 85 years, our party has preserved and developed the progressive creative line." According to the CCP, the "people are the force for creating history", and for the CCP to accomplish its task of modernization, it cannot become alienated from the people; it must creatively adapt theory and pursue strategic, sound policies. Therefore, having a correct understanding of Marxism and its development in China is crucial. Hu noted that progressiveness "is the essence of Marxist party building" and that it is "the basic service and eternal theme" of Marxism.

=== Socialist patriotism ===
Socialist patriotism is a concept invented by Vladimir Lenin, the informal leader of the Russian Bolshevik Party. It commits people to a non-nationalistic form of devotion to one's country. According to the standard Soviet definition, it means "boundless love for the socialist homeland, a commitment to the revolutionary transformation of society [and] the cause of communism". To ensure that socialist patriotism did not evolve into a form of nationalism (criticized as a bourgeois ideology), the people had to be committed to proletarian internationalism. The CCP, shortly after seizing power, defined three levels of socialist patriotism. "At the first level, individuals should subordinate their personal interests to the interests of the state. At the second level, individuals should subordinate their personal destiny to the destiny of our socialist system. At the third level, individuals should subordinate their personal future to the future of our communist cause." Mao's nationalism was not inclusivist, and people from certain classes were deemed unpatriotic from the outset. Chinese nationalism under Mao was defined as "anti-imperialist" and "anti-feudal" in principle. He considered nationalism of secondary importance to his main aim, further expanding the reach of the world revolution. Mao said "The Chinese Communists are internationalists; they advocate a world movement of great harmony. But at the same time, they are patriots who defend their motherland" and added "This patriotism and internationalism do not conflict, because only with China's independence and liberation can it be possible to participate in the world movement of great harmony."

Under Deng, the concept was further expanded. Believing that purer communist concepts such as class struggle and the like could not bring people together as they had done under Mao, his regime gave patriotism a larger role. In early 1982, the CCP initiated the "Three Loves" campaign under the slogan "Love the party, love socialism, and love the motherland". A year later, the Central Propaganda Department and the Central Research Office formulated a comprehensive plan to exploit nationalist feelings by making films and television programs out of China's "heroic struggle against Western and Japanese imperialism". "Patriotic activities" were added to the school system's extracurricular activities; the national flag was to be raised daily and pupils were to sing and learn the national anthem. By 1983, the party had concluded that "among patriotism, collectivism, socialism, and communism, patriotism has peculiar features and functions. [...] Patriotism is the banner of greatest appeal." Despite its broadened role, patriotism remained secondary to socialism. As Deng put it, "Some have said that not loving Socialism is not the same as not loving one's motherland. Is the motherland something abstract? If you do not love socialist New China led by the Communist Party, what motherland do you love?" According to official pronouncements, the CCP was the best representative of the nation, communists were the most devoted patriots, and socialism the only viable road for China to become "a great nation". Deng Liqun, in a similar vein, said, "One cannot demonstrate that one loves the motherland if one shows no deep love for the socialist system and the Communist Party. In short, in our times, loving the Chinese Communist Party is the highest expression of Chinese patriotism." Xi Jinping himself later added that "loving the country, the Party and socialism all at the same time" was the essence of patriotism in modern China.

The CCP has differentiated between patriotism and nationalism. Writing for the People's Daily, Zhang Jian, a professor at the School of Marxism of Nankai University separates patriotism from what he calls "narrow nationalism". He says that patriotism, in accordance with the withering away of the state, will one day disappear along with countries and social classes, but also that the current stage of human societal development does not yet possess the "objective conditions" for this, meaning patriotism remained as a valuable and progressive force to unite different races, ethnicities, classes, and political parties within a nation in a shared goal. He defines patriotism as the "loyal love for one's motherland", and calls it a common value of humanity since the emergence of nations, which he contrasts with nationalism that emerged in the 20th century and emphasizes national identity, national independence, and national self-determination. He dismisses those who equate patriotism with nationalism, and those equating nationalism with "narrow nationalism", which he defines as "xenophobia, narrow-minded selfishness, and ultranationalism". This equation, Zhang says, is used to attack common patriotic sentiments.

== Economics ==
=== Productive forces vs. superstructure ===
According to China scholar Maria Hsia Chang, Deng Xiaoping was "in a very real sense, a better Marxist theoretician than Mao Zedong." Deng had studied Marxism in the Soviet Union in the 1920s at the Moscow Sun Yat-sen University, unlike Mao who never studied Marxism in depth before the 1930s, enrolling in a course on historical materialism and Marxist economics. Like Mao, Deng rarely referenced Marxism when articulating new policies. When he did, he displayed a more advanced grasp of Marxism than Mao ever did. To take one example, in 1975 in "On the General Program of Work of the whole Party and the Whole Nation", Deng wrote;

Marxism holds that, within the contradictions between the productive forces and the relations of production, between practice and theory, and between the economic base and the superstructure, the productive forces ... and the economic base generally play the principal and decisive role ... Whoever denies this is not a materialist.

This position, while being based on Marxism, was criticized by Maoists at the time of being the "revisionist theory of the productive forces." In a break with classical Marxism, Mao argued that the superstructure should play the leading role in the revolution, that is the political system and individuals, and not the materialist forces, which Mao considered secondary. This ideology served as a significant base for his push into communism and improving the lives of working-class people. This was not a small ideological issue, and had been in the heart of Marxist theoretical debate since the era of Vladimir Lenin. Lenin had argued that socialist revolutions could occur in the peripheries of capitalism, that is countries not economically advanced enough to develop socialism according to Karl Marx, since these revolutions could instigate a revolutionary wave in the more advanced countries. Marx, in The Poverty of Philosophy, stated that "in acquiring new productive forces, men change their mode of production; and in changing their mode of production, in changing their way of earning a living, they change all their social relations." To explain, Marx believed as the productive forces, literally the economic forces, changed social relations would change, and when the social relations changed, something new would develop. In short, the Marxist founders argued that the socialist mode of production could only develop out of a developed capitalist economy, and not from a backward economy, developing it on a backward area was, according to Marx, a "chiliastic dream fantasy." After the failure of the revolutionary waves of the late-1910s, early 1920s, Lenin initiated the New Economic Policy, a series of policies which reintroduced capitalist economics in the country in a bid to develop socialism in Russia despite its backwardness. According to Maria Hsia Chang, Mao never grasped the central importance of the productive forces in developing socialism, and he argued until the end that socialism could be created through the superstructure alone with "revolutionary commitment, political intransigence, personal sacrifice, and selfless dedication [to the revolution]." Deng, on the other hand, stayed true to classical Marxism, arguing until his death that the productive forces played the central role.

The basic conflict between the Maoists and the Dengists was if China after 1949 had reached socialism or not, and what it would entail. In the aftermath of the Great Leap Forward and the Sino–Soviet split Mao himself, was even unsure if China had reached the socialist mode of production. In 1962 he reached the conclusion that China, despite having nationalized the means of production, had not reached the socialist mode of production in its mature form, claiming that the principle conflict as existing in China was between the proletariat and the "new bourgeois elements", which were constantly reproduced, and other enemies of the revolution. This view led Mao to introduce to the Cultural Revolution. Unlike Mao, who gave priority to superstructural elements, Deng argued in 1956 in the "Report on the Revision of the Constitution of the Communist Party of China", that socialism had taken root in socialism, since private property had been abolished, since nationalization of property Deng argued (again following the basic premises of classical Marxism) entailed removing the basis of other classes reproducing, stating;

Casual labourers and farm labourers have disappeared. Poor and middle peasants have all become members of agricultural producers' co-operatives, and before the distinction between them will have become merely a thing of historical interest ... The vast majority of our intellectuals have now come over to the side of the working class ... The conditions in which the urban poor and the professional people used to exist as independent social strata are virtually no longer present ... but the government control and regulation continues to soar,

In contrast to Mao, Deng argued that the principal contradiction in Chinese society was the backwardness of the productive forces, further adding that the party's "central task" over the coming years were to develop them. In addition he believed that China, since 1957, had been unable "to figure out what socialism is and how to build it". He criticized Mao's policies, particularly those after 1957, arguing that the CCP had "wasted twenty year."

=== Primary stage of socialism ===
The concept of a primary stage of socialism was developed mainly by Xue Muqiao and Su Shaozi. The concept began to evolve when the new post-Mao leadership of Deng began questioning Mao' assertion that "class struggle as the key link". Su, coauthoring with Feng Langrui, published an article in Economic Research (Chinese: Jingji yanju) in 1979 which called into question the Chinese socialist project by using Marxist methodology. The article analyzed the basis of Chinese socialism by looking at Karl Marx's writings; Marx drew a distinction between lower-stage communism (commonly referred to as the socialist mode of production) and higher-phase communism (often referred to as simply communism). Su's and Feng's article created three subdivisions within the socialist mode of production; the first phase was the transition from the capitalist mode of production to the socialist mode of production; which was (a) the phase in which the proletariat seized power and set-up the dictatorship of the proletariat and (b) in which undeveloped socialism was created, the second phase was advanced socialism (the socialism of which Marx wrote about). They argued that China was an undeveloped socialist nation since;

The characteristics of undeveloped socialism are the two forms of public ownership, commodity production and commodity exchange. Capitalists have been basically eliminated as a class but there are still capitalist and bourgeois remnants, even feudal remnants. There also exist quite a few small producers, class differences among workers and peasants ... and the force of habit of small-scale producers. The production forces are still not highly developed. And there is not an abundance of products. ... Therefore, the transition toward socialism has not yet been completed.

The concept of a primary stage of socialism led directly to the reconception of capitalism and socialism's polar-opposite relation to each other. Previously, the CCP had declared that supporting capitalism meant supporting an historical retreat, secondly, capitalism was considered the diametrical opposite of socialism and their relations were considered hostile and incompatible. The official reconception of the two terms were sanctioned in the Political Report to the 13th National Congress. Before the reform efforts, capitalism and socialism were believed to be part of a sequential relationship, with the latter developing from the former. A less traditional view was that capitalism had proven it had a "greater capacity for creating human civilization" than Marx expected, which indirectly meant that socialism could learn from capitalism. Another mark of continuity was that the two systems existed alongside each other.

=== Role of the market ===
Deng did not believe that the fundamental difference between the capitalist mode of production and the socialist mode of production was central planning versus free markets. He said, "A planned economy is not the definition of socialism, because there is planning under capitalism; the market economy happens under socialism, too. Planning and market forces are both ways of controlling economic activity". In his view, both state planning and market mechanisms were tools to liberate productivity, and that while a capitalist market economy is dominated by individualism, a socialist market economy would lead to common prosperity.

Jiang Zemin supported Deng's thinking, and stated in a party gathering that it did not matter if a certain mechanism was capitalist or socialist, because the only thing that mattered was whether it worked. It was at this gathering that Jiang Zemin introduced the term socialist market economy, which replaced Chen Yun's "planned socialist market economy". In his report to the 14th National Congress Jiang Zemin told the delegates that the socialist state would "let market forces play a basic role in resource allocation". At the 15th National Congress, the party line was changed to "make market forces further play their role in resource allocation"; this line continued until the third plenary session of the 18th Central Committee), when it was amended to "let market forces play a decisive role in resource allocation". Despite this, the third plenary session of the 18th Central Committee upheld the creed "Maintain the dominance of the public sector and strengthen the economic vitality of the State-owned economy".

=== Developmentalism ===
In the Deng-era, the slogan "development [as] the only solid truth" was emphasized. Beginning in 1998, the CCP began to shift from a focus on pure developmentalism towards eco-developmentalism. Responding both to scientific evidence on the environment and increasing public pressure, the party began to re-formulate its ideology to recognize that the developmentalist approach during reform and opening up was not sustainable. The CCP began to use the terminology of environmental culture (huanjing wenhua) and ecological civilization. The 1998 floods were a significant factor in this changing focus.

== Cultural and societal views ==
=== Stance on religion ===
The CCP, as an officially atheist institution, prohibits party members from belonging to a religion. Although religion is banned for party members, personal beliefs are not held accountable. Religiosity is to some degree present in the CCP, with one studying showing that 6% of CCP members identify with a religion. During Mao's rule, religious movements were oppressed, and religious organizations were forbidden to have contact with foreigners. All religious organizations were state-owned and not independent. Relations with foreign religious institutions were worsened when in 1947, and again in 1949, the Vatican forbade any Catholic to support a communist party. On questions of religion, Deng was more open than Mao, but the issue was left unresolved during his leadership. According to Ye Xiaowen, the former director of the State Administration for Religious Affairs, "In its infancy, the socialist movement was critical of religion. In Marx's eyes, theology had become a bastion protecting the feudal ruling class in Germany. Therefore, the political revolution had to start by criticizing religion. It was from this perspective that Marx said 'religion is the opium of the people'." It was because of Marx's writings that the CCP initiated anti-religious policies under Mao and Deng. The popularity of Falun Gong, and its subsequent banning by state authorities, led to the convening of a three-day National Work Conference for Religious Affairs in 1999, the highest-level gathering on religious affairs in the party's history. Jiang Zemin, who had subscribed to the classical Marxist view that religion would wither away, was forced to change his mind when he learnt that religion in China was in fact growing, not decreasing. In his concluding speech to the National Work Conference, Jiang asked the participants to find a way to make "socialism and religion adapt to each other". He added that "asking religions to adapt to socialism doesn't mean we want religious believers to give up their faith". Jiang ordered Ye Xiaowen to study the classical Marxist works in depth to find an excuse to liberalize the CCP's policy on religion. It was discovered that Friedrich Engels had written that religion would survive as long as problems existed. With this rationale, religious organizations were given more autonomy.

=== Stance on Chinese traditions ===
The CCP is historically notorious for attempting to destroy aspects of Chinese culture, mainly folk Confucianism in the form of Four Olds under Mao. This attitude has reversed under later leaders with a widespread claim to "5,000 years of history", culminating in Xi Jinping's open embrace of Confucianism as "the cultural soil that nourishes the Chinese people" and the addition of "cultural confidence" in the confidence doctrine. Under Xi Jinping, CCP concepts such as "Two Combines" and "Soul and Root" aim to fuse Marxism with aspects of traditional Chinese philosophy. On the other hand, traditional Chinese medicine (TCM) has always been endorsed by the CCP. While Mao valued TCM's use as a low-cost way to improve rural health, Xi's preference is more based on cultural concerns.

== Political positions ==
The Chinese Communist Party today officially upholds Marxism–Leninism adapted in the historical context of China; However, its position on the political compass is disputed.

- Many scholars, research centers and commentators argue that within western context, the political position of Chinese Communist Party does not fit clearly into either right or left-wing traditions.
- Some commentators argue that the Chinese Communist Party fits more into the right-wing political tradition in western context.
- Some commentators argue that the Chinese Communist Party today has combined both left and right-wing elements, fusing social conservatism and cultural nationalism with Marxist–Leninist political theories.

== See also ==
- Ideology of the Communist Party of the Soviet Union
- Communism
- State capitalism
  - Party-state capitalism
- Left-conservatism
- Reform and opening up
- Chinese nationalism
- Neoauthoritarianism (China)
- New Confucianism
- Chinese New Left
- Liberalism in China
- Wang Huning
