= Deng Xiaoping Theory =

Ideology developed by Deng Xiaoping

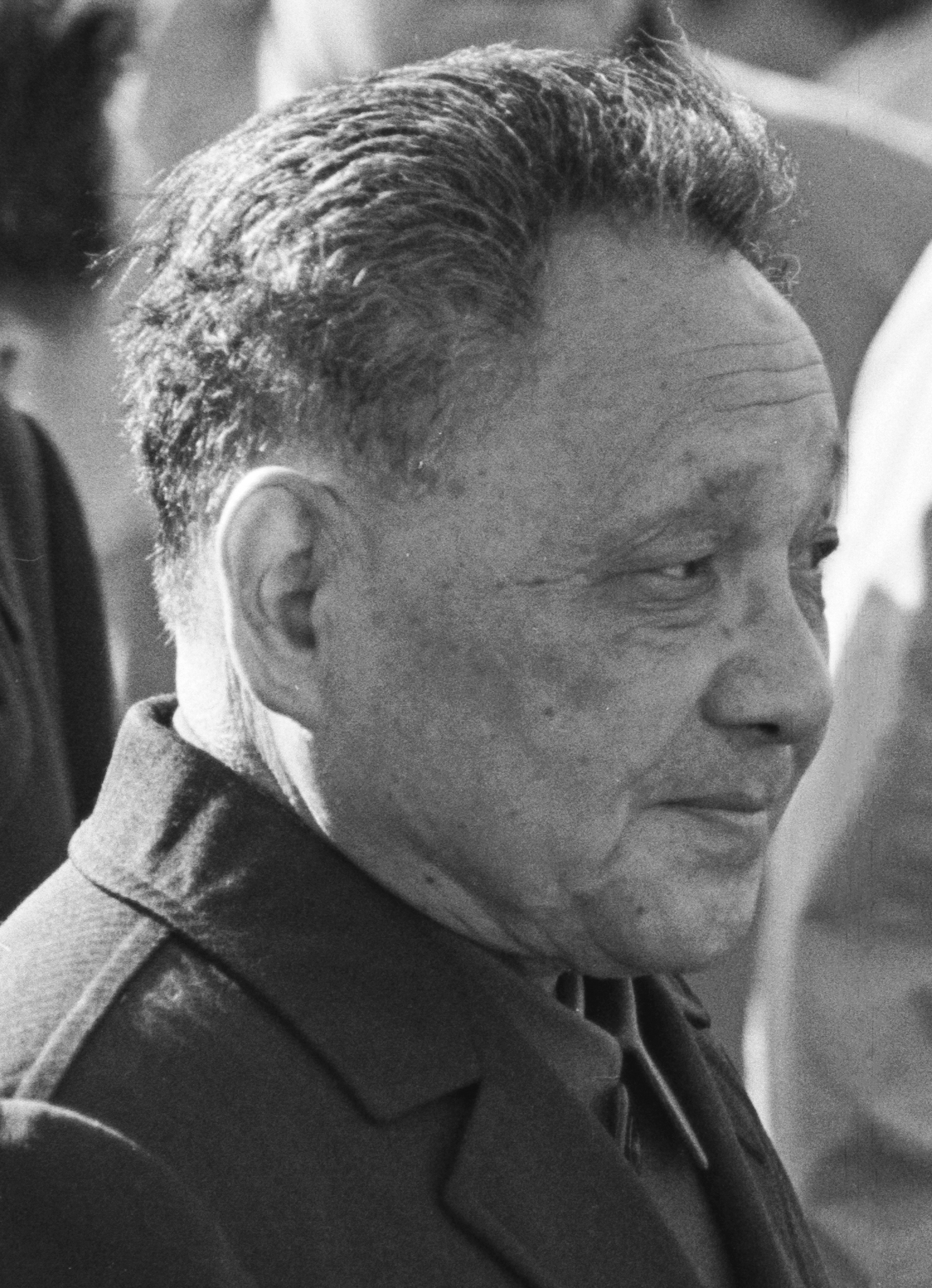
Deng Xiaoping

Deng Xiaoping Theory (Chinese: 邓小平理论; pinyin: Dèng Xiǎopíng Lǐlùn), also known as Dengism, is the series of political and economic ideologies first developed by Chinese leader Deng Xiaoping. The theory does not reject Marxism–Leninism or Maoism, but instead claims to be an adaptation of them to the existing socioeconomic conditions of China.

The theory also played an important role in China's modern economy, as Deng stressed opening China to the outside world, the implementation of one country, two systems, and through the phrase "seek truth from facts", an advocation of political and economic pragmatism.

== History ==
The fifth plenary session of the 13th Central Committee of the Chinese Communist Party in November 1989 approved Deng Xiaoping's resignation as the chairman of the Central Military Commission and praised his contributions to the theory of socialism with Chinese characteristics. Following Deng Xiaoping's southern tour, in March 1992, CCP General Secretary Jiang Zemin chaired a meeting of the CCP Politburo, requiring the entire Party to earnestly study "Deng Xiaoping's series of important expositions on building socialism with Chinese characteristics," which was the prelude to the formation of new formulations.

The political report of the 14th CCP National Congress introduced the concept of "Comrade Deng Xiaoping's Theory of Building Socialism with Chinese Characteristics". It also retained the terms "theory of socialism with Chinese characteristics," "path of socialism with Chinese characteristics," "cause of socialism with Chinese characteristics," and "great banner of socialism with Chinese characteristics". In February 1997, after Deng Xiaoping's death. In his eulogy, Jiang Zemin reiterated that Deng Xiaoping was the "founder of the theory of building socialism with Chinese characteristics" and continued to use the term "Deng Xiaoping's theory of building socialism with Chinese characteristics." Jiang redefined the theory, emphasizing that it "is the guiding ideology of the Chinese Communist Party and the spiritual pillar of the Chinese nation", explicitly designating "Deng Xiaoping's theory of building socialism with Chinese characteristics" as the Party's guiding ideology. The 15th CCP National Congress began using the term "Deng Xiaoping Theory" and enshrined it as the Party's guiding ideology in the Party Constitution.

== Synopsis ==
Drawing inspiration from Lenin's New Economic Policy, Deng's theory encouraged the construction of socialism within China by having it develop "Chinese characteristics", which was guided by China's economic reform policy with the goal of self-improvement and the development of a socialist system. His theory did not suggest improvement or development of China's closed economic system, but rather, overthrowing the existing economic system for a more open one.

Deng saw domestic stability as an important factor in economic development - "In China, the overriding need is for stability. Without a stable environment, we can accomplish nothing and may even lose what we have gained". He added that "stability is the basic premise for reform and development. Without stability nothing can be achieved". During the reform and opening up, Deng criticized those he deemed as the ideologues of the Cultural Revolution for seeking "poor socialism" and "poor communism" and believing that communism was a "spiritual thing". In 1979, Deng stated, "Socialism cannot endure if it remains poor. If we want to uphold Marxism and socialism in the international class struggle, we have to demonstrate that the Marxist system of thought is superior to all others, and that the socialist system is superior to capitalism".

China largely owes its economic growth to Deng Xiaoping's emphasis on economic production, under the theory of the productive forces – a subset of 20th century Marxist theory. In the view of Deng, the task faced by the leadership of China was twofold: (i) promoting modernization of the Chinese economy, and (ii) preserving the ideological unity of the Chinese Communist Party (CCP) and its control of the difficult reforms required by modernization. Deng believed that "only by constantly developing the productive forces can a country gradually become strong and prosperous, with a rising standard of living."

Deng argued that due to the isolation of China in the international order of the time and an extremely underdeveloped economy, in order for China to achieve socialism and to bridge the gap between China and Western capitalism, China would have to borrow certain market elements and aspects of capitalism into its economy. However, he also suggested that its usage would have to be state-controlled. These borrowed principles, in Deng's mind, allowed a more liberal interpretation of China's modernization into a socialist state. This includes marketing characteristics such as planning, production, and distribution that could be interpreted as socialism. Modernization efforts were generalized by the concept of the Four Modernizations, set forth by Zhou Enlai in 1963 and continued by Hua Guofeng after 1976, to improve agriculture, industry, national defense, and science and technology in China. Dengists still believe that public ownership of land, banks, raw materials, and strategic central industries is necessary so that a democratically elected government can allocate them for the benefit of the country as a whole; but at the same time, private ownership is allowed and encouraged in industries of finished goods and services. According to the Dengist theory, private owners in those industries are not a bourgeoisie, because in accordance with Marxist theory, the bourgeois owns land and raw materials. In Dengist theory, private company owners are called civil run enterprises.

To preserve ideological unity, Deng Xiaoping Theory formulated "Four Cardinal Principles" which the CCP must uphold:

- the "basic spirit of communism";
- the political system of the PRC, known as the people's democratic dictatorship;
- the leadership of the Communist Party, and;
- Marxism–Leninism and Mao Zedong Thought.

In 1992, fourteen years after Deng had become China's leader, he embarked on a tour of southern China. It was during this trip that Deng Xiaoping uttered the phrase "open up" (开放 Kāifàng), which would be the foundation for China's economic development up until the present day.

Dengists also take a very strong position against any form of cult of personality.

=== 14th National Congress report ===
In 1992, Jiang Zemin presented a report at the 14th CCP National Congress summarizing the main contents of Deng Xiaoping Theory into nine points.

- Allowing China to follow its own path to socialism
- Concluding that China is still in the primary stage of socialism
- That the goal of socialism is to liberate and develop productive forces, eliminate exploitation, and ultimately achieve common prosperity. So, developing the productive forces is the main priority.
- That reform should also be considered a revolution, and will lead to China's modernization, and that the goal of economic reform is to establish a socialist market economy system while upholding public ownership and distribution according to work.
- That peace and development internationally was needed for China's modernization, and that opening up to the world is necessary to achieve this.
- That China must adhere to the socialist road, maintain "the people's democratic dictatorship, uphold the leadership of the Communist Party of China, and adhere to Marxism-Leninism-Mao Zedong Thought."
- The proposal that modernization be achieved in three steps, with opportunities seized to provide relatively rapid development and high efficiency. Stating that poverty is not socialism, and that universal prosperity is not possible, it was determined that it was necessary to allow some regions people to become rich before others, which would then lead to China gradually achieving common prosperity.
- A reiteration that the Chinese Communist Party is the vanguard of the working class, and the central leadership in the socialist cause. Additionally declaring that the party must adapt to reform, opening up to the world, and modernization.
- Determining that with regards to national reunification, the policy of "one country, two systems" should be adopted, allowing the returned territories to maintain their systems of capitalism.

The report also highlighted the insistence in Deng Xiaoping Theory on upholding the Four Cardinal Principles to ensure the country does not peacefully evolve into capitalism and opposes bourgeois liberalization and its ideology.

== Relation to Maoism ==
Deng Xiaoping Theory downplays the Maoist focus on class struggle on the basis that that struggle would become an obstacle to China's economic development. It maintains that it upholds communism, the dictatorship of the proletariat, leadership of the Communist Party, Marxism–Leninism, and Mao Zedong Thought. Under this view, upholding Mao Zedong Thought does not mean blindly imitating Mao's actions without much deviation as seen in the government of Hua Guofeng, and that doing so would "contradict Mao Zedong Thought".

According to academic Richard Baum, little evidence of Mao's approach survived in Deng.

== Legacy ==
The Deng Xiaoping theory played a crucial role in transforming China from its previously state-owned command economy to a socialist market economy, which resulted in a rapid increase in economic growth within the country, known as the "Chinese economic miracle".

It has increased the Chinese GDP growth rate to over 8% per year for thirty years and China now has the second largest economy by nominal GDP in the world. Due to the influence of Dengism, Vietnam and Laos have also adopted similar beliefs and policies, allowing Laos to increase its real GDP growth rate to 8.3%. His economic reforms have also been referenced in discussions of other developing countries transitioning from planned economies to more market-oriented systems.

Deng's theory would be inherited by Jiang Zemin, along with aspects of Mao Zedong Thought and Marxist–Leninism, into a socio-political theory known as the "Three Represents". This theory was added to the Constitution of the Chinese Communist Party in 2002.

Having served as the CCP's major policy guide since the Third Plenum of the 11th CCP National Congress in 1978, the theory was entrenched into the Communist Party's Constitution as a guiding ideology in 1997, and was also subsequently written into the Constitution of China:

Since the Third Plenum of the 11th CPC Central Committee, the Chinese Communists, represented mainly by Comrade Deng Xiaoping, have summed up both the positive and negative experiences gained since the founding of New China, implemented the principle of emancipating the mind and seeking truth from facts, shifted the focus of the Party's work to economic development, introduced reform and opening, ushered in a new period for the development of the socialist cause, gradually formed the line, principles, and policies on building socialism with Chinese characteristics, expounded the basic issues concerning building, consolidating, and developing socialism in China, and created Deng Xiaoping Theory. Deng Xiaoping Theory is a product of the integration of the basic theory of Marxism–Leninism with the practice of modern China and the characteristics of the present era, the inheritance and development of Mao Zedong Thought under new historical conditions, a new stage of the development of Marxism in China, Marxism of modern China, and the crystallization of the collective wisdom of the CPC, guiding the cause of China's socialist modernization steadily forward.

== See also ==
- Cat theory
- Three Represents
- Scientific Outlook on Development
- Trickle-down economics
- Theory of the productive forces
- Titoism
- Perestroika
- Xi Jinping Thought
