= Primary stage of socialism =

Sub-theory of Chinese Marxist thought

The primary stage of socialism (sometimes referred to as the preliminary stage of socialism), introduced into official discourse by Mao Zedong as the initial stage of socialism, is a sub-theory of Chinese Marxist thought which explains why capitalist techniques are used in the Chinese economy. It maintains that China is in the first stage of building a communist society, in a stage where there is private ownership.

The concept was first introduced into official discourse by Mao Zedong, who did not elaborate on the concept. Chinese economist Xue Muqiao first introduced the term "underdeveloped socialism" and wrote that within the socialist mode of production there were several phases and for China to reach an advanced form of socialism it had to focus on developing the productive forces. In 1979, Chinese Communist Party (CCP) theoretician Su Shaozhi, an official from the People's Daily, began a debate when introduced the term "undeveloped socialism" to refer to China; he posited that the main contradiction in Chinese society was between the "advanced social system" and the "backward production forces". Su's theory led to the development of the primary stage of socialism under CCP General Secretary Zhao Ziyang's stewardship. The theory was further developed under General Secretary Jiang Zemin.

== Origins ==
The concept of a primary stage of socialism was conceived before China started the period of reform and opening up. When discussing the necessity of commodity relations at the 1st Zhengzhou Conference held between 2 and 10 November 1958, Mao Zedong—the Chairman of the Chinese Communist Party—said that China was in the "initial stage of socialism". Mao did not elaborate on the idea; his successors did.

=== Xue Muqiao's theory of the "immature socialist system" ===
Xue Muqiao introduced the term "underdeveloped socialism" in his book China's Socialist Economy. The book was written in the orthodox Marxist–Leninist framework enunciated by Joseph Stalin in Economic Problems of Socialism in the U.S.S.R. (1952). Xue wrote that within the socialist mode of production there were several phases and for China to reach an advanced form of socialism it had to focus on developing the productive forces. He proposed a theory in which the basic laws of economic growth were those in which "the relations of production must conform to the level of the productive forces". Similarly to Stalin, Xue considered the productive forces to be primary and that this was a fundamental universal law of economics. Unlike Stalin, Xue believed there were principles that guided the socialist transition, the key one being the principle of "from each according to his ability, to each according to his work"; this principle would guide socialist development, even when China had reached advanced socialism, and would be replaced with "from each according to his ability, to each according to his need" only when there existed general abundance. Xue based his arguments upon the economic policies pursued during the Cultural Revolution, which he believed had led to "the most severe setbacks and heaviest losses suffered by the Party, the state and the people since the founding of the People's Republic".

Xue believed the relations of production were determined by ownership in the economy. He said that since the productive forces in China were "backward", the relations of production were at a comparable level. While believing industry in China had become the "ownership of the whole people", Xue said agriculture was lagging far behind, which required ending the practice of paying wages based on collective efforts, supporting the re-introduction of individual incentives and increasing state investments in agriculture. Xue's suggestions were abandoned at the 6th Plenary Session of the 11th Central Committee held in June 1981 because they failed to solve the problems facing agriculture. From the 6th Plenary Session onwards, the CCP led by Wan Li began supporting the de-collectivization of agriculture. At the beginning, Wan chose a conservative reformist approach, stating that:

Prudence is necessary when approaching the reform of the commune institutions. We should not require each level to reform from top to bottom by prescribing a time limit for fulfilment. Until suitable new organizational forms can replace production brigades and teams, we should not recklessly change existing forms and bring about a disorderly situation.

Wan called for the dismantlement of the People's Commune system and its replacement with a household-responsibility system. He referred to the changes underway in the agricultural system as the creation of a new mode of production and called it the socialist commodity economy. CCP theorist Du Runsheng supported Wan's position, saying, "a principle of Marxism is that every change in the relations of ownership is an inevitable outcome of the development of new productive forces which can no longer fit in with the old relations of ownership". He also said:

Today's household undertakings are very different in nature. Since land is owned by the public, they are restricted by the collective economy in many ways. They represent a level of management in the co-operative economy, and constitute an organic component part of the entire socialist economy... It is feared that the household contracting system will promote the conservative idea of private possession among the peasants. This fear is not without grounds. However, we must be able to see the other side of the matter, which also happens to be the prevailing aspect. Today's peasants are different from those of the past. They are now new-type labourers under the socialist co-operative system.

=== Su Shaozhi's theory of "undeveloped socialism" ===
CCP and neoauthoritarian theoretician Su Shaozhi, an official from the People's Daily, began a debate in 1979 at a CCP theory conference to re-examine Mao Zedong's assertion of "class struggle as the key link" when he introduced the term "undeveloped socialism" to refer to China. Su, co-writing with Feng Langrui, published an article in Economic Research (Chinese: 经济研究; pinyin: Jīngjì yánjiū) in 1979 which called into question the Chinese socialist project by using Marxist methodology. The article analyzed the basis of Chinese socialism by looking at the writings of Karl Marx. Marx drew a distinction between lower-stage communism—commonly referred to as the socialist mode of production— and higher-phase communism—often referred to as communism. Su's and Feng's article created two subdivisions within the socialist mode of production; the first phase was the transition from the capitalist mode of production to the socialist mode of production—the phase in which the proletariat seized power and set-up the dictatorship of the proletariat and in which undeveloped socialism was created. The second phase was advanced socialism; the socialism that Marx wrote about. They said China was an undeveloped socialist nation because:

The characteristics of undeveloped socialism are the two forms of public ownership, commodity production and commodity exchange. Capitalists have been basically eliminated as a class but there are still capitalist and bourgeois remnants, even feudal remnants. There also exist quite a few small producers, class differences among workers and peasants … and the force of habit of small-scale producers. The production forces are still not highly developed. And there is not an abundance of products … Therefore, the transition toward socialism has not yet been completed.

Su and Feng opposed the party line that the main contradiction in Chinese society was between the "advanced social system" and the "backward production forces". This line, originally conceived of at the 8th National Congress held in 1956 but removed by Mao and re-introduced after Mao's death, was intended to emphasize the importance of improving the economy. Su found it problematic because it meant that the superstructure could be more advanced than the level of the productive forces—a statement that was not in line with classical Marxism. Su countered, saying that China did not have a material base for a full transition to socialism. He said:

The socialist system consists mainly of production relations. Whether a production relation is advanced or not is determined by just one criterion, namely, whether or not it can meet the demands of production forces and facilitate their development. Although some production relations, such as commune ownership, may be superior to ownership by the production team in terms of the stage of development, in rural China today, where manual labor remains predominant, only ownership by the production team, rather than by the commune, would be the type of production relations capable of measuring up to the level of production forces and facilitating their development. If ... commune ownership is adopted, it would damage the development of production forces.

The response to Su and Feng's article was mixed. Some responded positively and called for a retreat from socialist practices and a return to the policies of New Democracy—a period that lasted until 1956 when China had a mixed economy. More conservative elements tried to suppress it. Deng Liqun, the Deputy President of the Chinese Academy of Social Sciences (CASS), used his powers to organize a meeting which criticized Su, who had become a member of the CASS Institute of Marxism–Leninism after writing the article. While Su garnered some support from high-standing officials, such as General Ye Jianying, the concept was the target of several crackdowns; the first occurred in 1981 during a crackdown on socialists supporting liberal democracy. A later crackdown was orchestrated by longstanding party theoretician Hu Qiamou and thirdly during the Anti-Spiritual Pollution Campaign in 1983. The reasoning was that the idea lent weight for forces opposed to socialism in China and was therefore dangerous. Despite this, the 6th Plenary Session of the 11th Central Committee sanctioned the idea that China was in the "primary stage of socialism", even if key theoreticians such as Wang Xiaoqiang dismissed Chinese socialism as "agrarian socialism", believing that socialism had been constructed on a feudal base.

==== Formulating the theory of a primary stage of socialism ====
Su's theory of undeveloped socialism led to the formulation of the primary stage of socialism theory under CCP General Secretary Zhao Ziyang's stewardship. The term had been used by the CCP during the Anti-Spiritual Pollution Campaign of 1983 but had never been explained. After consulting with Deng Xiaoping, the theory of a primary stage of socialism was used as the theoretical basis of the Political Report to the 13th National Congress held in 1987. The theory focused mainly on developing the productive forces and took a highly economic deterministic view on developing socialism. Despite certain pitfalls, the theory is still used to explain the use of capitalist techniques in China. The main aim of the theory was to reconceptualize socialism to make Marxism fit for contemporary use. It posited that in China's current historical stage, low productive capacity was a fundamental national condition that could be ignored. Zhao explained:

When a backward country is trying to build socialism, it is natural that during the long initial period its productive forces will not be up to the level of those in developed capitalist countries and that it will not be able to eliminate poverty completely. Accordingly, in building socialism we must do all we can to develop the productive forces and gradually eliminate poverty, constantly raising the people’s living standards. Otherwise, how will socialism be able to triumph over capitalism? In the second stage, or the advanced stage of communism, when the economy is highly developed and there is overwhelming material abundance, we shall be able to apply the principle of ‘from each according to his ability, to each according to his need.

Su and Zhang Xiangyang said the primary stage of socialism in China began in the 1950s when the CCP put an end to the policies of New Democracy and would last an estimated 100 years. The previous emphasis on economic equality in favour of economic growth was abandoned. Deng stated:

Of the many lessons we have to sum up, a very important one is this: we should make clear what is socialism and how to build socialism ... The primary task of socialism is to develop production forces and to elevate the standard of the material and cultural life of the people. Our twenty years of experience from 1958 to 1976 have told us: poverty is not socialism, socialism is to eliminate poverty. It is not socialism to not develop production forces and raise the people's living standards.

By this point, Deng had equated upholding socialism with developing the level of the productive forces; the ideal of common equality was postponed until an unspecified time. Su and Zhang reached similar conclusions, saying that Marx had two goals when he wrote about the socialist future: a social system in which the productive forces developed and the individual would be granted a great chance of self-development. However, developing the productive forces became the precondition for the greater self-learning of the individual through common equality; Su and Zhang said that the former would lead to the latter. The left were generally pleased with the theory, which was based upon orthodox Marxist premises. However, some people on the right considered the theory was proof that China needed to reintroduce capitalism to build socialism. Marx had written that socialism developed from capitalism, but China had skipped the capitalist mode of production and went from feudalism to socialism.

Zhao's adviser Bao Tong's article "The Young Horse of Socialism, the Old Horse of Capitalism, and Other Related Matters published in the People's Daily, became the first theoretical work which tried to explain the concept. Bao said because the economic foundation of socialism in China was weak and contained elements of feudalism, and that acknowledging China's position as being in the primary stage of socialism would answer "many ideological questions can be readily solved". Chen Junsheng, the Secretary-General of the State Council, wrote a similar article that stressed the need to uphold the Four Cardinal Principles and reform during the primary stage of socialism.

=== Further developments ===
General Secretary Jiang Zemin further elaborated on the concept, first during a speech to the CCP Central Party School on 29 May 1997 and again in his report to the 15th National Congress on 12 September. According to Jiang, the 3rd plenum of the 11th Central Committee correctly analyzed and formulated a scientifically correct program for the problems facing China and socialism. In Jiang's words, the primary stage of socialism was an "undeveloped stage". The fundamental task of socialism is to develop the productive forces, therefore the main aim during the primary stage should be the further development of the national productive forces. The primary contradiction in Chinese society during the primary stage of socialism is "the growing material and cultural needs of the people and the backwardness of production". This contradiction will remain until China has completed the process of primary stage of socialism—and because of it—economic development should remain the party's main focus during this stage.

Jiang elaborated on three points to develop the primary stage of socialism. The first—to develop a socialist economy with Chinese characteristics—meant developing the economy by emancipating and modernizing the forces of production while developing a market economy. The second—building socialist politics with Chinese characteristics—meant "managing state affairs according to the law", developing socialist democracy under the party and making the "people the masters of the country". The third point—building socialist culture with Chinese characteristics—meant turning Marxism into the guide to train the people so as to give them "high ideals, moral integrity, a good education, and a strong sense of discipline, and developing a national scientific, and popular socialist culture geared to the needs of modernization, of the world, and of the future".

From the perspective of CCP theorists, China needed to develop its industrial base during the primary stage of socialism in order to resume the development towards the "highest ideal of communism", which the CCP constitution states "can be realized only when socialist society is fully developed and advanced." When asked how long the primary stage of socialism would last, Zhao replied "[i]t will be at least 100 years [...] [before] socialist modernization will have been in the main accomplished". The state constitution states that "China will be in the primary stage of socialism for a long time to come". As with Zhao, Jiang believed that it would take at least 100 years to reach a more advanced stage, stating it will "will take at least a century to complete this historical process." Jiang added that following the primary stage of socialism, "a much longer period of time to consolidate and develop the socialist system" will be needed, and that attaining communism during this period "will require persistent struggle by many generations, a dozen or even several dozen".

Jiang said "the true reality is that China is currently in the primary stage of socialism and will remain in this stage for a long time to come…. This is a historical stage we cannot jump over". He said China would "accomplish industrialization", "realize socialist modernization by and large", "gradually narrow the gap between our level and the advanced world standard", and "bring about a great rejuvenation of the Chinese nation on the basis of socialism" during the primary stage of socialism. In January 2013, CCP general secretary Xi Jinping said that "for a long period to come, socialism in the primary stage must also cooperate and compete with capitalist countries armed with greater developed productivity".

In January 2021, Xi Jinping identified three stages in the history of the Chinese Communist Party; the era of New Democracy from 1921 to 1949, based on class collaboration with the objective of overthrowing feudalism and imperialism, the initial period from the founding of the People's Republic of China and the era of "socialist development" from 1949 to 1978, and the period of reform and opening up from 1978. Xi further divided the reform and opening up era from 1978 to 2012, and the new era of socialism with Chinese characteristics from 2012. Xi said the primary stage of socialism was compatible with Mao's view that socialism had three stages; the "underdeveloped" stage, followed by a "comparatively developed" stage. followed, in turn, by a period of "most ample... material production and spiritual prosperity" that would represent the first stage of communism.

Xi said that "We have laid a solid material foundation to embark on a new journey and achieve new and higher goals by our unremitting endeavors since the founding of the new China, especially over the four decades since the reform and opening up". Xi described the primary stage of socialism:

The primary stage of socialism is not a static, cast-iron, or stagnant period, nor is it a spontaneous and passive stage that can easily and naturally be passed through. Rather, it is a stage of dynamism, action, and promise, one that should always brim with vitality. It develops gradually but ceaselessly, moving from quantitative increases to qualitative leaps. Fully building a modern socialist China and basically socialist modernization are essential for China’s development in the primary stage of socialism, and essential for China to advance from the primary stage to a higher stage of socialism.

Xi further added:

In 1992, Deng Xiaoping stated: “We have been building socialism for only a few decades and are still in the primary stage. It will take a very long historical period to consolidate and develop the socialist system, and it will require persistent struggle by several generations, a dozen or even several dozens. We can never rest on our oars.” In my opinion, Deng made this remark from a political perspective. He was pointing out that it would take a fairly long period of hard work to turn China into a modern country based on the weak economic foundations of the time. But he was also saying that we must persevere with China’s socialist system from one generation to the next, even after modernization is achieved.

== Effect on party ideology ==
=== Changing views on capitalism ===
The re-conception of socialism led directly to the re-conception of capitalism because of their diametric opposition to each other. Previously, the CCP had said supporting capitalism meant supporting a historical retreat and capitalism was considered the diametric opposite of socialism and their relations were considered hostile and incompatible. The official re-conception of the two terms was sanctioned in the Political Report to the 13th National Congress. Before the reform efforts, capitalism and socialism were believed to be part of a sequential relationship, the latter developing from the former. A less traditional view was that capitalism had proven it had a "greater capacity for creating human civilization" than Marx expected, which indirectly meant that socialism could learn from capitalism. Another mark of continuity was that the two systems existed alongside each other.

The first change in official discourse was to rebuke Vladimir Lenin's theory of imperialism. Lenin had reached the conclusion that capitalism had reached the stage of imperialism, a stage in which capitalism would undergo a protracted crisis that would lead to war, the inevitable socialist revolutions and the end of war by the newly established socialist states. This theory had formed the basis of Chinese foreign policy well into the 1970s, but was not officially rebuked until Zhao's report to the 13th National Congress. At the congress, Zhao re-used a 1985 statement by Deng Xiaoping, in which he said, "[t]he major themes of the contemporary world are peace and development". By saying that the task of socialist countries was maintaining "peace and development" rather than "war and revolution", Deng was upbraiding Lenin's theory. According to Su and Zhang, the rationale for the change was that:

- the decline in ideological conflict in tandem with the creation of nuclear weapons had radically changed East–West relations and the end of colonialism had altered the basis of North–South relations;
- technical and scientific progress had—despite Marx' forecast—strengthened capitalism and changed the international arena since Lenin's death;
- the increased economic interdependence brought by economic globalization had reduced the risks of war;
- the reforms within socialist states had brought socialist economies closer to the world market and the capitalist economies.

Xu Jiatun, a CCP theoretician, said capitalism had changed from the days of Marx; proof of this was "the emergence of macroeconomic regulation, the welfare state, and the middle class that had ameliorated socioeconomic structures and class relations under capitalism. Xu concluded that capitalism had proved a more successful system than Chinese socialism, which was based on feudal ideology and institutions. Yu Guangyuan said Marx was wrong and that the changes within capitalism had allowed for a much greater development of the productive forces than Marx could ever think possible. However, the most common view was the convergence theory, whose adherents' views were published in leading media outlets throughout the country. The convergence theory said socialism and capitalism were becoming increasingly similar, since capitalist and socialist countries were becoming increasingly similar in economic terms; planning was taking place in capitalism, market economics was occurring in socialism, ownership and management were separated under both systems, and both had undergone similar patterns of modernization. On this basis, the proponents of convergence theory called on people to stop asking whether a certain technique was capitalist or socialist because it did not matter anymore. The result of the convergence theory was to de-ideologize the meaning of the two terms.

=== Historical materialism: universal law or methodology ===
At the 13th National Congress, Zhao concluded that the common rightist error when analyzing Chinese development was to question the legitimacy of the revolution and socialist superstructural elements established in its aftermath and that the common leftist error was to believe that you could skip over the primary stage of socialism directly to advanced socialism, a view that Zhao designated as utopian. He said:

A correct understanding of the present historical stage of Chinese society is of prime importance for building socialism with Chinese characteristics, and it is the essential basis on which to formulate and implement a correct line and correct policies. Our Party has already made a clear and definite statement on this question: China is now in the primary stage of socialism. There are two aspects to this thesis. First, the Chinese society is already a socialist society. We must persevere in socialism and never deviate from it. Second, China’s socialist society is still in its primary stage. We must proceed from this reality and not jump over this stage. . . . Under the specific historical conditions of contemporary China, to believe that the Chinese people cannot take the socialist road without going through the stage of fully developed capitalism is to take a mechanistic position on the question of the development of revolution, and that is the major cognitive root of rightist mistakes. On the other hand, to believe that it is possible to jump over the primary stage of socialism, in which the productive forces are to be highly developed, is to take a utopian position on this question, and that is the major cognitive root of leftist errors

However, there was a problem; according to official statements, China had an advanced superstructure and a backward productive forces; this went against classical Marxism, which said the superstructure was "solely determined by economic factors"—in China the mode of production was determined by the superstructure. All this went against the general notion of Marx' theory of historical materialism, which states that a mode of production is solely grounded on the material base. However, Su and Zhang did not believe these discrepancies had proven the theory wrong; they concluded that historical materialism should be considered "a scientific methodology for the analysis of the general trend", not a universal law that explained former and future historical processes. According to Su and Zhang, instead of viewing one factor—economy—as dominant, as was previously done, one should analyze how all factors interact with each other, especially the effects of the superstructure on the rest of society. In their view, superstructural elements "played an obvious role in China's 'leap' from semifeudalism to socialism". Socialism in China was safeguarded by the CCP and its commitment to Marxist ideology.

The problem with historical materialism as law-binding was, according to the rightists, what role humans played in historical development and the possibility of the existence of modes of production other than those outlined by Marx. According to Hong Yingsan, the notion of a primary stage of socialism was difficult because it entailed that China was simultaneously pre-capitalist and post-capitalist. This went against the basic notion in historical materialism that history was unilinear rather than multilinear, and proved that other factors than the productive forces in society "could determine the mode of production in a given society". The problem facing the CCP was that unilinear view of history meant that China could not adopt socialism because it had skipped the capitalist mode of production, but a multilinear view meant that China did not need to adopt socialism because it was not a specific "stage in human evolution". Su and Zhang said the most pressing problem for CCP theorists to answer was, "do people have freedom to choose a particular set of production relations?". They pointed to Marx's theory of an Asiatic mode of production. Some rightists argued against the mode of productions envisioned by Marx, stating that all changes in human history were subjective and were not guided by universal laws.

=== The role of Marxism ===
While the CCP pursued non-orthodox economic policies, it believed the party would be able to safeguard China's goal of socialist development by transforming Marxism into a dominant value system. This was reflected by the introduction of the term socialist spiritual civilization, a concept introduced in 1981 and mentioned in the Political Report to the 13th National Congress. The main function of socialist spiritual civilization was to check against the dangers of ideological retreat in the party's effort to progress toward socialism. A CCP resolution in 1986 said, "we will be not able to guarantee the socialist direction of our modernization course, and our socialist society will lose its goals and ideals" if the party stopped upholding Marxist doctrine. However, because the material base, officially referred to as material civilization, created by the economic reforms did not conform with Marxist analysis of socialism, the CCP concluded that in the new era, Marxism would be given the role as the dominant value system, which entailed that other value systems could be accepted but these systems could not negate Marxism.

== See also ==
- China model
- State capitalism
