= Poverty is not socialism =

Saying of Deng Xiaoping

"Poverty is not socialism" (Chinese: 贫穷不是社会主义; pinyin: Pínqióng bùshì shèhuìzhǔyì) is a political term coined by Chinese leader Deng Xiaoping in the 1980s.

== History ==
The idea that “poverty is not socialism” can be traced back to Deng Xiaoping's first visit to the Shenzhen Special Economic Zone in 1984. During this visit, he affirmed the Special Economic Zone. Since then, the argument that “the Special Economic Zone cannot be run” has basically disappeared. Scholars even traced it back to Deng Xiaoping's Northern Speech in 1978.

In 1984, in his speech "Building Socialism with Chinese Characteristics", Deng Xiaoping said: "Socialism must eliminate poverty. Poverty is not socialism, let alone communism." In 1985, Deng Xiaoping said: "The primary task of socialism is to develop productivity and gradually improve the people's material and cultural living standards. The experience of the twenty years from 1958 to 1978 tells us that poverty is not socialism. Socialism aims to eliminate poverty."
