= Theory of the productive forces =

Technological determinism in Marxism

The theory of the productive forces, sometimes referred to as productive force determinism, is a variation of historical materialism and Marxism that places primary emphasis on technical advances as the basis for advances and changes in the social structure and culture of a given civilization. The relative strength assigned to the role of technical or technological progress in impacting society and social advancement differs among different schools of Marxist thinkers. A related concept is technological determinism.

On a prescriptive level, this view places a strong emphasis on the necessity of strengthening the productive forces of the economy as a precondition for the realization of socialism, and within a nominally socialist economy, essential to achieving communism. This theory was held by many orthodox Marxists as well as Marxist–Leninists, playing a crucial role in informing the economic policies of current and former socialist states.

== Empirical support ==
The most influential philosophical defence of this idea was promulgated by Gerald Cohen in his book Karl Marx's Theory of History: A Defence. According to this view, technical change can beget social change; in other words, changes in the means and intensity of production causes changes in the relations of production, i.e., in people's ideology and culture, their interactions with one another, and their social relationship to the wider world. This view point is a foundation of orthodox Marxism.

In this view, actual socialism, being based on social ownership and a wide distribution of an abundant surplus product, cannot come to pass until that society's ability to produce wealth is built up enough to satisfy its whole population and to support socialist production methods. Using this theory as a basis for their practical programmes meant that communist theoreticians and leaders in most socialist states, while paying lip service to the primacy of ideological change in individuals to sustain a communist society, actually put productive forces first and ideological change second.

The theory of the productive forces is encapsulated in the following quote from The German Ideology:

[I]t is only possible to achieve real liberation in the real world [...] by employing real means[.] [S]lavery cannot be abolished without the steam-engine and the mule and spinning-jenny, serfdom cannot be abolished without improved agriculture, and that, in general, people cannot be liberated as long as they are unable to obtain food and drink, housing and clothing in adequate quality and quantity. "Liberation" is a historical and not a mental act, and it is brought about by historical conditions, the development of industry, commerce, agriculture, the conditions of intercourse [Verkehr].

— Karl Marx, The German Ideology, "Part I: Feuerbach. Opposition of the Materialist and Idealist Outlook"

=== Socialist states ===
Based on the theory of the productive forces and related perspectives, in the economic systems of the former Eastern Bloc and the present-day socialist states, the State accumulated capital through surpluses from state owned enterprises for the purpose of rapidly modernizing and industrializing their countries, because these countries were not technologically advanced to a point where an actual socialist economy was technically possible, or where a socialist state could actually try to reach a communist mode of production. The philosophical perspective behind the modernizing zeal of the Soviet Union and the People's Republic of China was based on the desire to industrialize their countries.

== See also ==
- Economic determinism – Theory that all societal relationships are based on economic relationships
- Historical materialism – Marxist theory of history and society
- Information revolution – Industrial shift to information technology
- Mode of production – Concept which originated in the thought of Karl Marx
- Socialist mode of production – Marxian economy centered around use value, planning and contribution-based distribution
- Technological determinism – Reductionist theory
