= Outline for the Study of Xi Jinping Thought on Socialism with Chinese Characteristics for a New Era =

2021 political textbook

- Editors: Ministry of Education; Ai Silin (Editor-in-Chief); Wu Yujun (Editor-in-Chief for Lower Primary School); Chen Peiyong (Editor-in-Chief for Upper Primary School); Xiao Guiqing (Editor-in-Chief for Junior High School); Qin Xuan and Lin Jianhua (Editors-in-Chief for Senior High School)
- Original title: 习近平新时代中国特色社会主义思想学生读本
- Language: Mandarin Chinese
- Genre: Ideological and political education
- Publisher: People's Publishing House; People's Education Press
- Publication date: July 2021
- Publication place: Mainland China
- Media type: Print (Hardcover, Paperback)
- ISBN: 978-7-107-35974-3 (lower grades of elementary school)

Outline for the Study of Xi Jinping Thought on Socialism with Chinese Characteristics for a New Era is a political textbook for primary, secondary and university students in China that focuses on Xi Jinping Thought. It includes five volumes, namely, lower primary school, upper primary school, junior high school, senior high school and university. It aims to promote the development of ideological and political education in primary, secondary and university schools in China. The Outline presents content based on the receptive capacity of students at different stages of education.

== Content ==
This textbook is an important compulsory course for primary, secondary and university students. The complete set consists of 5 volumes, one for each of the third grade of primary school, the fifth grade of primary school, the second grade of junior high school, the first grade of senior high school and university students.

=== Primary school lower grade ===
The primary school lower grade volume has 6 lectures in total, with pictures and texts, focusing on storytelling, focusing on loving the Chinese Communist Party (CCP), loving the country, and loving socialism, "making people determined to listen to the Party and follow the Party from an early age", and teaching how to "consciously practice the core socialist values". Chapter titles include "The Party and the People Are Heart to Heart", "Grandpa Xi Jinping Cares about the People", "I Have a Dream", "We Are the Successors of Communism", "Grandpa Xi Jinping's Expectations for Us", and "Fasten the First Button of Your Life".

=== Primary school senior grade ===
The primary school senior grade volume has 14 lectures in total. The characteristic of this volume is that the title of each lecture and each section is a "golden sentence" said by Xi Jinping. The chapter titles include "Great undertakings all begin with dreams", "The key to running China's affairs lies in the Party", "The iron must be hard itself", "Everyone should discuss matters of the public", "Establish rules, talk about rules, and abide by rules", "A person without spirit cannot stand, and a country without spirit cannot be strong", "The cake must be made bigger and divided well", "Peace needs to be protected", "Humanity is a community with a shared future" and "Our planet has become a harmonious family".

=== Junior high school ===
The junior high school grade volume has 8 lectures in total, focusing on the layout of "eight clarifications", covering the state governance strategy, strategic guarantees, external conditions and political guarantees, aiming to increase understanding of socialism with Chinese characteristics and strengthen students' ideological awareness of becoming socialist builders and successors. Focusing on readability, a large number of "golden sentences" used by General Secretary Xi Jinping in his speeches and articles are quoted. For example, in the overall layout of promoting the "five-in-one" overall strategy, the description of ecological civilization construction uses easy-to-understand expressions such as "clean water, fresh air, and beautiful environment", and the text has a sense of picture. Chapter titles include "The Chinese Dream of the Great Rejuvenation of the Chinese Nation", "Socialism with Chinese Characteristics Entering a New Era", "Five-in-one and Four-pronged", "A Strong Country Must Have a Strong Military", "Join Hands in Hand to Build a Community with a Shared Future for Mankind", and "The Party Central Committee is the Commander in Chief".

=== High school ===
The high school grade volume has 8 lectures in total. Based on the high school ideological and political textbooks, the lectures aims to guide students to understand Xi Jinping Thought on Socialism with Chinese Characteristics for a New Era from eight aspects from a theoretical perspective, so that it can be deeply engraved in their minds. The lectures aim to "arm hundreds of millions of students with the latest achievements of the Party's theoretical innovation, help them feel the personal charm and patriotism of General Secretary Xi Jinping, bear in mind General Secretary Xi Jinping's earnest instructions, strengthen the "four confidences", and cultivate successors who love the Party, the country, and socialism". Chapter titles include "The New Era Nurtures Xi Jinping Thought on Socialism with Chinese Characteristics for a New Era", "Comprehensively Building a Modern Socialist Country", "Upholding and Strengthening the Party's Overall Leadership", "Comprehensively Promoting the Five-in-One", "Coordinated Promoting the Four-in-One", "Strengthening the Four Consciousnesses and Achieving the Two Upholds", "Promoting the Joint Construction of the Belt and Road Initiative", and "Working Together to Build a Community with a Shared Future for Mankind".

=== University ===
The university volume includes an introduction, a conclusion and 12 chapters. This textbook is officially guided by the spirit of the 19th CCP National Congress and its previous plenary sessions, and relies on works such as The Governance of China. It explains the core points of Xi Jinping Thought, including the theoretical basis, main theme, theoretical contribution and strategic layout. Officially, it combines the ideological reality of college students in the new era, strengthens problem awareness and focuses on resolving doubts. Chapter titles include "Scientific theory leading the times", "Logically rigorous scientific system", "Unique and distinctive theoretical qualities and thinking methods", "Ideological banner and action guide that keeps pace with the times", "Major contradictions in our society in the new era", "Five-in-one overall layout and four-pronged strategic layout", "Realizing the Chinese dream of the great rejuvenation of the Chinese nation", "Adhering to and strengthening the overall leadership of the Party", "Strengthening the four consciousnesses, firming up the four self-confidences, and achieving the two safeguards", "The country is the people, and the people are the country", "China's door to opening up will only open wider and wider", "Promoting supply-side structural reform", "Green waters and green mountains are gold and silver mountains", "The reunification of the motherland is an inevitable requirement for the great rejuvenation of the Chinese nation", "Joining hands to build a community with a shared future for mankind", and "Youth is the future of the motherland and the hope of the nation".

== Release ==
The Ministry of Education's "Xi Jinping Thought on Socialism with Chinese Characteristics for a New Era Research Center" and the "Xi Jinping Thought on Socialism with Chinese Characteristics for a New Era Research Institute" of Peking University, Tsinghua University and Renmin University of China participated in the compilation of the Outline. Ai Silin, Dean of the School of Marxism at Tsinghua University, served as the Chairman of the Editorial Committee of the Outline. Wu Yujun, Professor of the School of Philosophy at Beijing Normal University, served as the Editor-in-Chief of the Lower Primary School Volume; Chen Peiyong, Vice Dean of the School of Marxism at Peking University, served as the Editor-in-Chief of the Upper Primary School Volume; Xiao Guiqing, Professor of the School of Marxism at Tsinghua University, served as the Editor-in-Chief of the Middle School Volume; Lin Jianhua, Vice Dean of the Institute of Marxism at the Chinese Academy of Social Sciences, served as the Editor-in-Chief of the High School Volume; Qin Xuan, Professor of the School of Marxism at Renmin University of China, served as the Editor-in-Chief of the University Volume.

Starting from the fall semester of 2021, primary and secondary schools across the country began to use the Outline. Starting from the fall semester of 2022, the reader became a new textbook used uniformly across China.
