= Lei Feng =

Chinese soldier (1940–1962)

- 雷锋
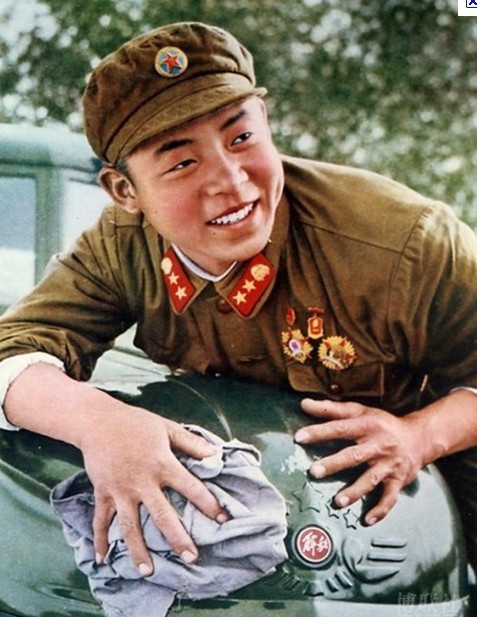
- Lei c. 1960s wearing Type 58 uniform
- Born: 18 December 1940; Wangcheng, Hunan, Republic of China
- Died: 15 August 1962 (aged 21); Fushun, Liaoning, People’s Republic of China
- Cause of death: Work accident
- Occupation: Soldier
- Political party: Chinese Communist Party

Chinese name
- Simplified Chinese: 雷锋
- Traditional Chinese: 雷鋒
Transcriptions
Standard Mandarin
- Hanyu Pinyin: Léi Fēng
- Wade–Giles: Lei^{2} Feng^{1}
- IPA: [lěɪ fə́ŋ]

Lei Feng (Note: In this Chinese name, the family name is Lei (雷).) (18 December 1940 – 15 August 1962), born Lei Zhengxing, was a Chinese soldier in the People's Liberation Army who was the object of several major propaganda campaigns in China. The most well-known of these campaigns in 1963 promoted the slogan "Follow the examples of Comrade Lei Feng." Lei was portrayed as a model citizen, and the masses were encouraged to emulate his selflessness, modesty, and devotion to Mao Zedong. In the following years, Lei Feng was portrayed as a symbol and model of party revolution by both the Chinese Communist Party and Government of China. For decades, he was used to promote the "Learn from Lei Feng as a Model" in the media. Political ideology closely follows the Chinese Communist Party, actively helping others in work and daily life, practicing frugality and thrift, and upholding the socialist spirit of "one for all, all for one" which is known as the Lei Feng spirit. After Mao's death, Chinese state media continued to promote Lei Feng as a model of earnestness and service, and his image still appears in popular forms such as on T-shirts and memorabilia.

The biographical details of Lei Feng's life, and especially his diary, are generally believed by Western historians to be propaganda creations; even the historicity of Lei Feng himself is sometimes questioned. Contemporary research believed that Lei's diary was edited and propagandized, but not fabricated. The continuing use of Lei in government propaganda has become a source of cynicism and even derision amongst segments of the Chinese population. Nevertheless, Lei's function as a propaganda icon has survived decades of political change in China.

== Life ==
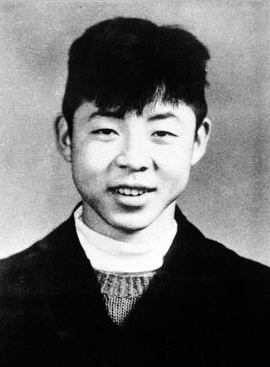
Lei Feng as a young man

The current biography of Lei Feng as given in China's state media says that he was born in Wangcheng (near the town of Leifeng, Changsha, Hunan, named in his honour). According to CNTV, Lei's immediate family all died before the establishment of the People's Republic, leaving him an orphan. His father died when he was just five (killed by the invading Japanese Army), his elder brother, who was exploited as a child labourer, died a year later, and his younger brother died soon afterward. Finally, his mother died by suicide after being "dishonored by a landlord."

In the autumn of 1958, Anshan Iron and Steel Group (Angang) recruited workers in Changsha, Hunan Province. Lei Feng was recommended and joined the Angang Mining Company's Gongchangling Iron Mine as a bulldozer operator.

He became a member of the Communist youth corps when he was young and joined a transportation unit of the People's Liberation Army at the age of twenty. According to his official biography, Lei died in 1962 at the age of 21 (22 by Chinese East Asian age reckoning, by which a newborn is age 1 at birth), when a telephone pole, struck by an army truck, hit him as he was directing the truck in backing up.

== Popular image ==
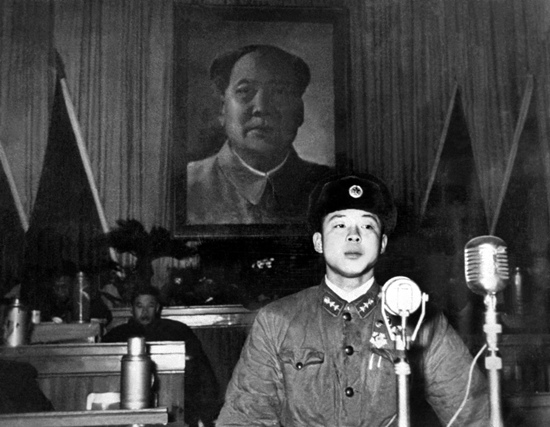
Lei Feng speaking at the Communist League conference in February 1962, months before his death

Lei Feng, Chinese poster by Qiu Wei (丘玮). Caption reads: "Follow Lei Feng's example; love the Party, love Socialism, love the people".

In popular analysis, Lei Feng and his diary were not widely known until after his death. According to Harold Tanner, Lei Feng's Diary was first presented to the public by Lin Biao in the first of many "Learn from Lei Feng" campaigns in 1963, after Lei's death. The diary was full of accounts of Lei's admiration for Mao Zedong, his selfless deeds, and his desire to foment revolutionary spirit. Famously, he pledged that his only ambition was "to be a rustless screw" in the revolutionary cause. Lin's use of Lei's diary was part of a larger effort to improve Mao's image, which had suffered after the Great Leap Forward. Western scholars generally believe that the diary was forged by Party officials under Lin's direction.

However, contemporary researchers noted that Lei Feng's diary was not in fact discovered after his death; excerpts had already been published between 1959 and 1960, then circulated through the Party propaganda system until Mao's approval helped turn Lei Feng into a national icon. Lei Feng was, unlike earlier historians believed, already a well-known media figure while he was alive.

The diary contains about 200,000 words describing selfless thoughts with enthusiastic comments on Mao and the inspiring nature of the Party. The campaign began at a time when the Chinese economy was recovering from the Great Leap Forward campaign. In 1964 the Lei Feng campaign shifted gradually from doing good deeds to a cult of Mao.

When Lei Feng died in the line of duty, he was only 22, but his short life gives concentrated expression to the noble ideals of a new people, nurtured with the communist spirit, and also to the noble moral integrity and values of the Chinese people in the new period. These are firm faith in communist ideals, political warmheartedness for the party and the socialist cause, the revolutionary will to work arduously for self-improvement, the moral quality and self-cultivation of showing fraternal unity and taking pleasure in assisting others, the heroic spirit of being ready to take up cudgels for a just cause without caring for one's safety, the attitude of seeking advancement and studying hard, and the genuine spirit of matching words with deeds and enthusiastically carrying out one's duties.

— Editorial, People's Daily, 5 March 1993

Chinese leaders have praised Lei Feng as the personification of altruism. Leaders who have written about Lei Feng include Deng Xiaoping, Zhou Enlai, and Jiang Zemin. His cultural importance is still reproduced and reinforced by the media and cultural apparatus of the Chinese party-state, including emphasizing the importance of moral character during Mao's era. Lei Feng's prominence in school textbooks has since declined, although he remains part of the national curriculum. The phrase huó Léi Fēng (活雷锋; lit. "living Lei Feng") has become a noun (or adjective) for anyone who is seen as selfless, or anyone who goes out of their way to help others.

The CCP's construction of Lei Feng as a celebrity soldier is unique to the PRC and differs from the more typical creation of military heroes by governments during times of war. In the PRC, Lei Feng was part of continuing public promotion of soldiers as exemplary models, and evidence of the People's Liberation Army's role as social and political support to the Communist government.

=== Historicity and authenticity ===
Details of Lei Feng's life have been subject to dispute. While someone named Lei Feng may have existed, scholars generally believe the person depicted in the campaign was almost certainly a fabrication. The argument for inauthenticity, for instance, is that the campaign presented a collection of twelve photographs of Lei Feng performing good deeds. The photographs were of exceptionally high professional quality, and depicted Lei—supposedly an obscure and unknown young man—engaging in mundane tasks. This question on photographs was first bought by Associated Press reporters, and became central to the questions on Lei Feng's historicity and inauthenticity. There are also arguments that Lei Feng's deeds could have been real, because the staged photographs were commissioned reenactments of events attributed to Lei Feng by the People's Liberation Army leadership for a traveling exhibit, during Lei's rise to stardom in China, rather than proof that the person and all his actions were invented.

Traditional Western historians believed that Lei Feng and his diary became popular only after his death, which contributed to the view that the Party fabricated his diary or his identity. Xiaofeng Tian argued that Lei Feng's diary was edited but not entirely fabricated. The diary's content reflected a highly self-conscious production, which included Lei Feng's personal experience of being bullied in the military due to his short stature, his self-awareness of the publicity he received, descriptions of the famine during the early People's Republic (which were deleted in later editorialization during the Cultural Revolution), and his personal sentiments, which were consistent with the cultural and social circumstances of 1950s and 1960s China. The diary was later popularized and reshaped into propaganda to fit the ideological frameworks of different political periods, but Tian believed the "popularity of Lei Feng is not simply a product of communist party propaganda".

=== Contemporary cultural importance ===
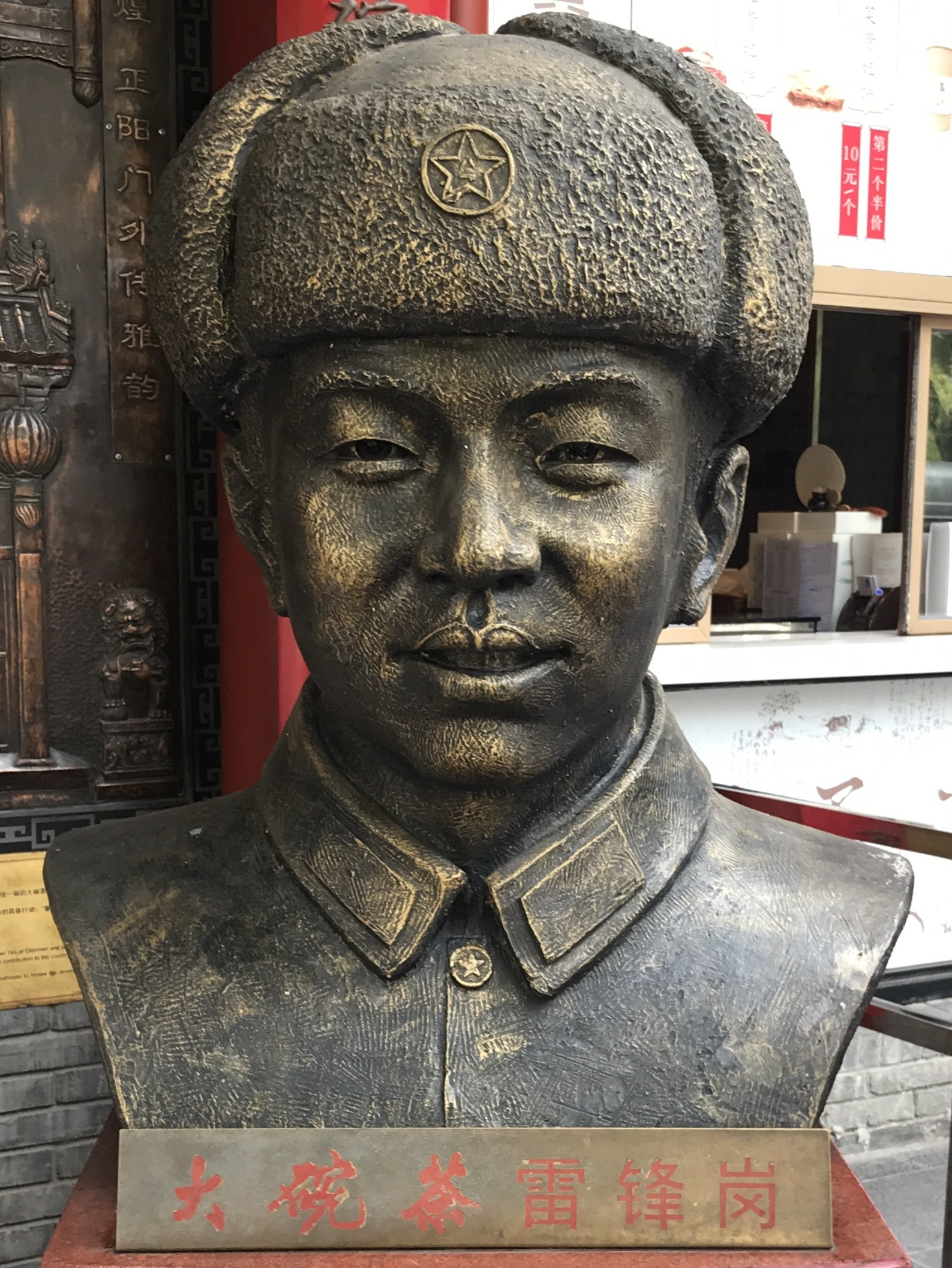
A bust of Lei Feng in Beijing, China, 2019

The 5th of March has become the official "Learn from Lei Feng Day" (Chinese: 学雷锋日; pinyin: Xué Léi Fēng Rì). This day involves various community and school events where people go to clean up parks, schools, and other community locations. Local news on that day usually has footage from these events.

Lei Feng is especially honoured in Changsha, Hunan, and in Fushun, Liaoning. The Lei Feng Memorial Hall (in his birthplace, now named for him, Leifeng) and Lei Feng statue are located in Changsha. The local hospital carries his name. There is also a Lei Feng Memorial Hall, with a museum, in Fushun. Lei Feng's military unit was based in Fushun, where he died. His tomb is located on the memorial grounds. To commemorate Lei Feng, the city of Fushun named several landmarks in honor of him. There is a Lei Feng Road, a Lei Feng Elementary School, a Lei Feng Middle School and a Leifeng bank office.

There is a common misconception that Lei Feng was well known in the US and honored at West Point. The myth has been traced to a 1981 April Fool's Day article that Xinhua News Agency reporter Li Zhurun mistook for a real article. Li issued a retraction in 2015.

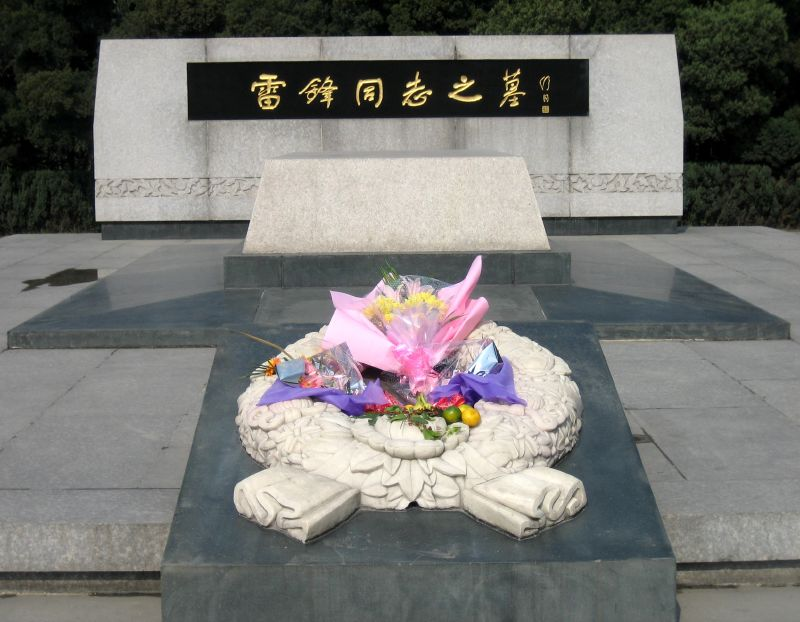
Lei Feng's tomb

Lei Feng's story continues to be referenced in popular culture. A popular song by Jilin singer Xue Cun (雪村) is called "All Northeasterners are Living Lei Fengs" (Chinese: 东北人都是活雷锋; pinyin: Dōngběi Rén Dōu Shì Huó Léifēng). (Note: Lusby gives "Dōngběi Rén Dāng Huó Léifēng" (东北人当活雷锋) which is less commonly used than "Dōngběi Rén Dōu Shì Huó Léifēng" (东北人都是活雷锋).) A 1995 release, originally notable only for its use of Northeastern Mandarin, shot to nationwide fame when it was combined with kitsch animations on the Internet in 2001. In March 2006, a Chinese organization released an online game titled Learn from Lei Feng Online (学雷锋) in which the player has to do good deeds, fight spies, and collect parts of Mao Zedong's collection. If the player wins, he or she gets to meet Chairman Mao in the game. In the 21st century his image has been used to sell items including, in one case, condom packaging.

By the 2010s, interest in Lei Feng had devolved into kitsch, with his face still commonly appearing on t-shirts, stickers, and posters, but interest in his life story and diary was minimal, as ticket sales to feature-length biographical films, Young Lei Feng, Lei Feng’s Smile and Lei Feng 1959, released on Learn from Lei Feng Day, failed to produce any takers at all in some cities. Reportedly, party cadres in rural areas have been charged by the State Administration of Radio, Film, and Television with organizing group viewings.

The lauded details of Lei Feng's life according to official documents led him to become a subject of derision and cynicism among segments of the Chinese populace. As John Fraser recalled, "Any Chinese I ever spoke to outside of official occasions always snorted about Lei Feng."

A 2008 Xinhua survey noted that a large number of elementary school students have vague knowledge of Lei Feng's life, and that only 32 percent of those surveyed have read Lei's diary.

== Learn from Lei Feng Campaign ==
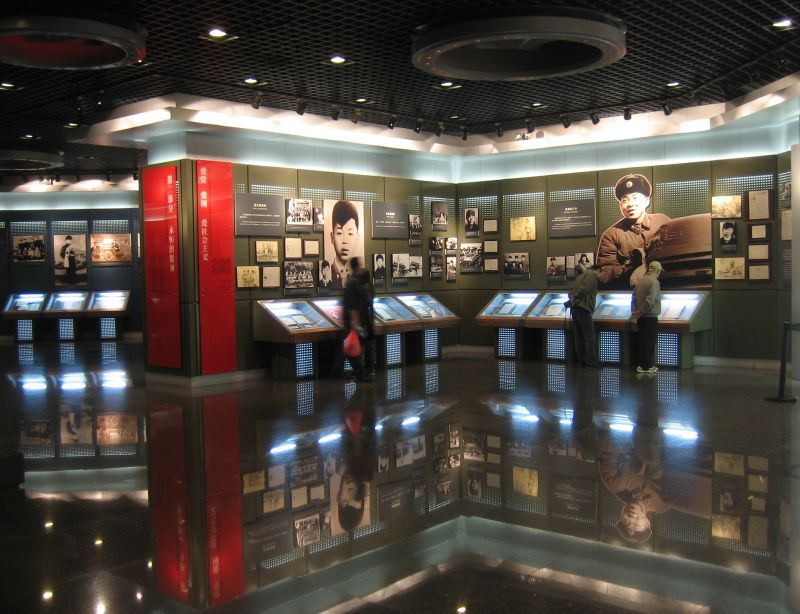
Lei Feng Memorial Hall, Wangcheng District, Changsha, Hunan

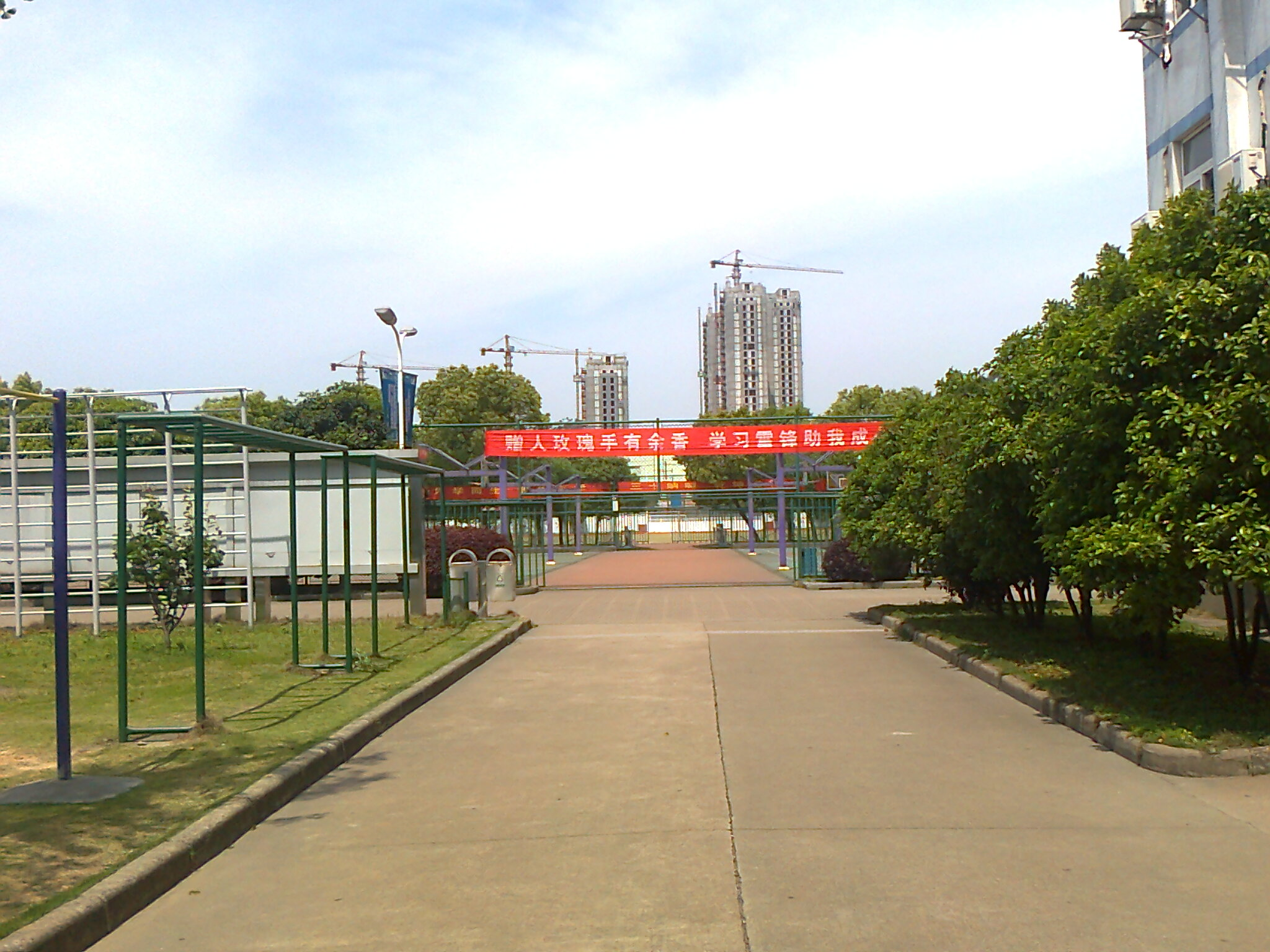
Banner outside the dormitory at Guancheng Middle School, Cixi, Zhejiang: "A rose given leaves a lingering fragrance — Learning from Lei Feng helps me grow."

=== Purpose ===
The 'Learn from Lei Feng' campaign is a political education initiative vigorously promoted by the People's Republic of China and the Chinese Communist Party. It forms part of the state's efforts in promoting Marxism–Leninism and Mao Zedong Thought, Party ideology, and communist moral education.

=== Liaoning Province ===
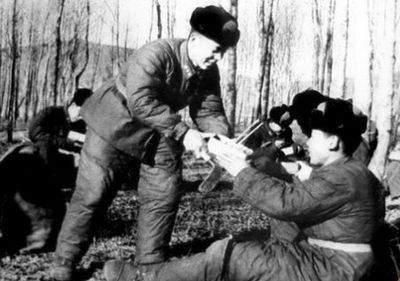
In 1960, Lei Feng gave a lunchbox to his comrade Wang Yantang. (As recorded in Lei Feng's diary on 21 October 1960: 'I noticed Comrade Wang Yantang sitting by himself, watching everyone else eating lunch. He told me, "I ate two lunchboxes this morning and didn't bring one today." So, I offered him the lunchbox I had brought, even though I was a bit hungry. Seeing him eat his fill was my greatest joy...')

Following his death, Lei Feng was posthumously honored as an outstanding Young Pioneers counselor across the country. Liaoning initiated a province-wide campaign to learn from Lei Feng. On 23 October, the Fushun Municipal Youth League Committee issued a notice titled 'Notice on Organizing Youth to Visit the Lei Feng Exhibition Room and Conduct Class Education.' The Liaoning Provincial Youth League printed 400,000 copies of 'Chairman Mao's Good Soldier' and reprinted 70,000 copies of comic strips depicting Lei Feng's deeds. Additionally, they produced 800 sets of photos for grassroots-level small exhibitions in cooperation with the Liaoning Photo Agency, promoting the Lei Feng learning movement across the province. This initiative caught the attention of Hu Yaobang, the First Secretary of the Central Committee of the Communist Youth League at the time. He emphasized the importance of this activity as a model of noble communist ideological qualities and instructed that it should be established as an important measure in the ongoing communist education. On 15 February 1963, the Central Committee of the Communist Youth League issued a notice titled 'Notice on Widely Conducting the "Learn from Lei Feng" Educational Campaign Among Youth Nationwide.' The notice stated, 'Comrade Lei Feng's brilliant life has set an example for Chinese youth, with a firm proletarian stance and noble communist moral character. The Central Committee of the Communist Youth League believes that local youth organizations should follow the experience of Liaoning and widely promote the "Learn from Lei Feng" educational campaign among youth.' The Central Youth League's publication, 'China Youth,' published Mao Zedong's inscription in support of the campaign.

=== Nationwide ===
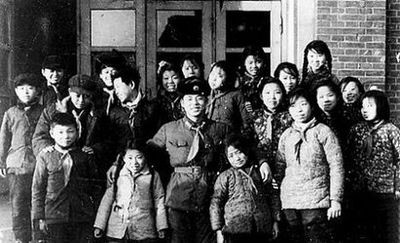
Lei Feng with elementary school students from Jianshe Street, Fushun.（According to records, while serving as a youth counselor, Lei Feng often spent his spare time participating in the students' extracurricular activities. This photo was later staged as a re-enactment.）

The nationwide "Learn from Lei Feng" campaign began with Mao Zedong's inscription, "Learn from Comrade Lei Feng."

On 5 March 1963, People's Daily published Mao's call on its front page. On the second page, an article by Luo Ruiqing stated: "The most fundamental and prominent reason why Lei Feng became a great soldier is that he repeatedly read Chairman Mao's books, sincerely followed Chairman Mao's words, acted at all times according to Chairman Mao's instructions, and wholeheartedly strove to be a good soldier of Chairman Mao." 5 March was designated as the national "Learn from Lei Feng Day." On 15 March 1963, the Sichuan Provincial Committee of the Communist Youth League issued a notice titled "On Extensively and Deeply Launching the Learn from Lei Feng Campaign Among Youth Across the Province," which called for people to "earnestly study Chairman Mao's works, follow Chairman Mao's words, and act in accordance with Chairman Mao's instructions." In 1964, Luo Ruiqing remarked, "Wherever Chairman Mao's works are well studied—be it by individuals or units—the work is done well. This is true of the Daqing Oil Field, the 'Model Eighth Company,' Lei Feng, Guo Xingfu as well." In Issue 21 of China Youth magazine in 1964, readers were urged to "Learn from Comrade Lei Feng" and to "earnestly follow Chairman Mao's instructions." Some scholars argue that Lin Biao's interpretation of the Learn from Lei Feng campaign, which emphasized being a "good soldier of Chairman Mao," shifted the revolutionary standard from loyalty to the cause and the people, to loyalty to the Party, and ultimately to personal loyalty to Mao Zedong, contributing to the development of the Cultural Revolution.

From 1965 onwards, ideological and political education in schools centered on the study of Mao Zedong's works, following Lin Biao's directive of "active learning and application, integrating study with use, prioritizing immediate use, and achieving immediate results." Everyone was required to write study notes. Various groups dedicated to learning from Lei Feng emerged, as well as numerous stories of people doing good deeds and becoming 'unsung heroes' by following his example.

=== Timeline ===
The current "Learn from Lei Feng" movement primarily involves activities organized through schools for students and the military for officers and soldiers. These activities mainly include cleaning, offering visiting and comforting and similar actions, with the goal of promoting the "Spirit of Lei Feng". The activities typically take place on Lei Feng's birthday, the anniversary of his death, Learn from Lei Feng Day (5 March), or other special occasions. These events usually last only one day and are sometimes referred to as One-Day Lei Feng activities.

Date	Initiating Organization	Official Document	Related Events
November 1960	Shenyang Military RegionPeople's Liberation Army Infrastructure Engineering Corps	"Instruction on Launching the 'Learn from Lei Feng, Catch up with Lei Feng' Campaign in the Troops"; "Report on Using Lei Feng's Exemplary Deeds as Living Teaching Materials to Support Current Troop Education"	
15 February 1963	Central Committee of the Communist Youth League of China	"Notice on the Nationwide Campaign to Promote 'Learning from Lei Feng' Among Young People"	After the Great Leap Forward, during the Great Chinese Famine
5 March 1963	Mao Zedong	Inscription "Learn from Comrade Lei Feng"	10th Plenary Session of the 8th Central Committee: "Strengthen Class Education for the Youth"
5 March 1977	People's Daily	"Learn from Comrade Lei Feng"	Down with the Gang of Four， ending the Cultural Revolution
21 July 1977	10th Central Committee of the Chinese Communist Party	"Communiqué of the Third Plenary Session of the 10th Central Committee of the Chinese Communist Party"	Welcoming the 11th National Congress of the Chinese Communist Party
21 February 1981	Central Committee of the Communist Youth League of China	"Notice on Further Carrying Out the Lei Feng Study and Promoting New Trends Activities"	
25 December 1989	Central Committee of the Communist Youth League of China	"Ten Opinions on Strengthening and Improving Ideological and Political Work"	1989 Tiananmen Square protests and massacre，Anti-bourgeois liberalization
9 January 1990	Central Committee of the Communist Youth League of China	"Notice on Further Carrying Out the Activities of Learning Lei Feng's Spirit and Becoming Youths with Four Virtues"	1989 Tiananmen Square protests and massacre
15 February 1990	Hunan Provincial Committee of the Chinese Communist Party、Hunan Provincial People's Government、Hunan Military District	"Notice on Mobilizing All Military and Civilian Forces in the Province to Deeply Study the Spirit of Lei Feng and Make Contributions to Socialist Construction and Reform"	1989 political turmoil
21 February 1991	Central Committee of the Communist Youth League of China	"Opinions on Deepening the Campaign to Study Lei Feng"	
12 February 1992	Central Committee of the Communist Youth League of China、ACYF、ACSF、Young Pioneers of China	"Opinions on Deepening the Campaign to Study Lei Feng"	
18 October 2011	CCP	"Decision on Several Major Issues Concerning Deepening Cultural System Reform and Promoting the Great Development and Prosperity of Socialist Culture"	Sixth Plenary Session of the 17th Central Committee of the Chinese Communist Party
2 March 2012	General Office of the Chinese Communist Party	"Opinions on Deepening the Campaign to Study Lei Feng" (Zhongbanfa [2012] No. 7)	Wang Lijun incident，in anticipation of the 18th National Congress of the Chinese Communist Party，building the socialist core value system
21 February 2012	All-China Federation of Trade Unions	"Deepening the Campaign to Study Lei Feng" (Zong Gong Fa [2012] No. 14)	
27 February 2012	Party Committees of Departments of All Central State Organs	"Notice on Deepening the Campaign to Study Lei Feng"	
4 December 2016	Publicity Department of the CCP Central Committee, National Civilization Office of the CCP Central Committee, Ministry of Education, Ministry of Civil Affairs, Ministry of Culture, State Administration of Cultural Heritage, and China Association for Science and Technology	"Implementation Opinions on Carrying Out Lei Feng Volunteer Services in Public Cultural Facilities"	

== See also ==
- Comrade Ogilvy
- Dong Cunrui
- Former Residence of Lei Feng
- List of campaigns of the Chinese Communist Party
- Learn from Lei Feng's Good Example
- Pavlik Morozov
- Alexey Stakhanov
- Wang Jinxi
- Zhang Side
- Pat Tillman
