= Type 58 (military uniforms) =

Chinese People's Liberation Army uniform

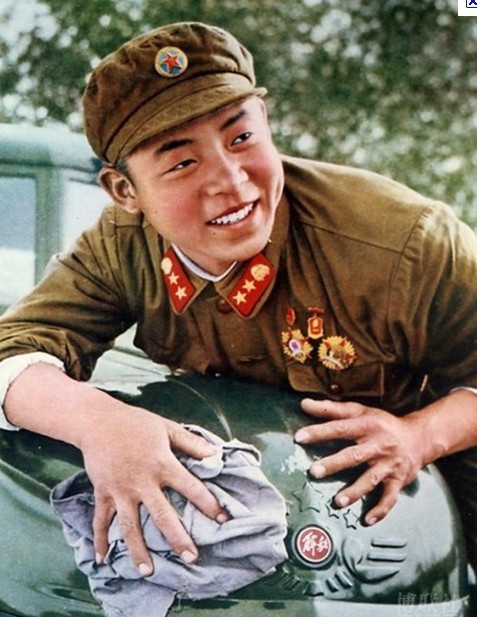
Lei Feng wearing a 58-style military uniform

Type 58 uniform (Chinese: 中国人民解放军58式军服) of the Chinese People's Liberation Army were the military uniforms that succeeded the Type 55 uniform. Because it was first issued in 1958, it is called the Type 58 uniform.

== Overview ==
On January 18, 1958, Peng Dehuai, Minister of National Defense of the People's Republic of China, issued an order to modify the original Type 55 uniform and issue newly designed rank collar insignia. The rank shoulder insignia previously worn on the Type 55 uniform were changed to be worn on holidays, gatherings, diplomatic occasions, trips abroad and other formal occasions. In July 1958, according to the decision of the enlarged meeting of the Central Military Commission, the boat-shaped caps of soldiers of the Army and Air Force were abolished and replaced with the Liberation Cap. Army and Air Force officers also wore the Liberation Cap in peacetime, while only Navy officers wore the Peaked Cap in peacetime. The Peaked Caps of Army and Air Force officers were only worn with shoulder insignia on holidays, diplomatic occasions and other occasions. Soldiers' uniforms were changed to loose cuffs, and the materials of summer uniforms of officers of all ranks and winter uniforms of junior officers were changed to cotton plain cloth; the large shoulder insignia of naval soldiers were abolished and replaced with rank collar insignia.

== Clothing ==
The clothing of the Type 58 uniform was improved on the basis of the Type 55 uniform. The most obvious feature was that the shoulder insignia and Peaked Cap were abolished on the uniform. Medals were no longer worn and dress uniforms were no longer issued. The original Type 55 peaked cap, shoulder boards, and slanted belt uniform were used as dress uniforms. The Type 55 dress uniform was no longer issued, so officers promoted to new ranks after 1958 did not have high-level dress uniforms. The Type 58 officer uniform no longer wore medals, rank insignia were replaced with collar insignia, a liberation cap was worn, and slanted belts were not worn. The newly issued uniforms were made of cotton plain cloth, just like those of soldiers. Soldiers abolished the boat-shaped cap, and the tight cuffs of the uniforms were changed to loose cuffs. Naval shore service soldiers and naval aviation soldiers no longer wore sailor uniforms, but were issued dark blue dress uniforms with the same style as the army and wore liberation caps. The large shoulder boards of the naval soldiers' overcoats were abolished and replaced with rank collar insignia. The Type 58 uniform did not completely abolish the boat-shaped cap; the submarine force of the navy retained the boat-shaped cap until 1965. Starting in 1961, the People's Liberation Army also issued a multi-layered winter uniform consisting of fleece jackets and trousers, cotton-padded coats, overcoats, shirts and trousers. It was finalized and put into production in 1962 and named the Type 62 uniform. It was officially equipped by the troops in 1964.

== Decoration ==
Type 58 rank insignia collar tabs. The rank insignia of the Type 58 military were changed to collar tabs, and the design style no longer followed the Soviet style of the Type 55 military insignia.

== Type 60 ==
Branch Insignia In 1960, the People's Liberation Army began using new branch insignia. Due to changes in the PLA's organization and structure at the time, some branches were added. Moreover, due to the Sino-Soviet split and the increase in domestically produced weapons and equipment in the PLA, significant changes were made to the original Type 55 branch insignia design. For example, the motor transport insignia was changed from the Soviet GAZ truck to the Liberation truck, the armored vehicle insignia was changed from the T-34 tank to the Type 59 tank, and the artillery insignia was changed from the crossed ancient Chinese cannon design to the main types of artillery currently in service with the PLA. In addition, some organizational structures and systems of the army underwent significant changes, including the addition and adjustment of many branch specialties, such as special engineering and hydroelectric engineering. In addition, the PLA's management system for branch insignia was not strict at the time, resulting in extremely chaotic production and wearing of branch insignia. Even the same branch of the same army wore different insignia. For example, there were five different insignia for the armored forces at that time.
