= National Key School of Marxism =

Honorary designation for top university Schools of Marxism in China

National Key School of Marxism is a title launched by the Publicity Department of the Chinese Communist Party and the Ministry of Education. This title is awarded to the Schools of Marxism established in universities in China.

== History ==
In October 2015, the Publicity Department of the Chinese Communist Party and the Ministry of Education jointly issued the "Innovation Plan for the Construction System of Ideological and Political Theory Courses in Ordinary Colleges and Universities", proposing to focus on building a number of Marxist colleges.

=== First batch ===
In January 2016, the Schools of Marxism at Peking University, Tsinghua University, Renmin University of China, Nankai University, Jilin University, Fudan University, Shandong University, Wuhan University and Lanzhou University were selected as the first batch of national key schools of Marxism.

=== Second batch ===
In March 2017, the Schools of Marxism at Beijing Normal University, Dalian University of Technology, Northeast Normal University, East China Normal University, Nanjing University, Zhejiang University, Fujian Normal University, Zhengzhou University, Sun Yat-sen University, Sichuan University, Xi'an Jiaotong University and Xinjiang Normal University were selected as the second batch of national key schools of Marxism.

=== The third batch ===
In August 2019, the Schools of Marxism at Capital Normal University, Tianjin Normal University, Anhui Normal University, Shandong Normal University, Hunan University, South China Normal University, Guangxi Normal University, Guizhou Normal University, Hebei Normal University, Liaoning University, Harbin Normal University, Tongji University, Nanjing Normal University, Jiangxi Normal University, Central China Normal University and Southwest University were selected as the third batch of national key Marxist colleges.

On September 1, 2020, the Ministry of Education published an article in the journal Qiushi, stating that starting from the fall semester of 2020, all universities with National Key Schools of Marxism will offer the course "Introduction to Xi Jinping Thought on Socialism with Chinese Characteristics for a New Era".
