= Introduction to Mao Zedong Thought and the Theoretical System of Socialism with Chinese Characteristics =

Chinese Communist Party textbook

- Original title: 毛泽东思想和中国特色社会主义理论体系概论
- Language: Standard Chinese
- Genre: Ideological and political education
- Publisher: People's Publishing House; Higher Education Press
- Publication place: China
- Media type: Print (Hardcover, Paperback)
- ISBN: 978-7-04-059903-9

Introduction to Mao Zedong Thought and the Theoretical System of Socialism with Chinese Characteristics is a political course for university students in the People's Republic of China (PRC). It is also the name of the textbook used in this course, which studies Mao Zedong Thought and the theoretical system of socialism with Chinese characteristics.

== History ==
Initially, the course was divided into two courses: "Introduction to Mao Zedong Thought" and "Deng Xiaoping Theory". The name of the course "Deng Xiaoping Theory" had the following historical names:

- Building Socialism with Chinese Characteristics
- Deng Xiaoping's Building Socialism with Chinese Characteristics
- An Introduction to Deng Xiaoping Theory and the Important Thought of "Three Represents"

After the 17th National Congress of the Chinese Communist Party in 2007, these two courses were integrated into the current courses.

== Content ==
This course mainly introduces the "theoretical achievements of the Sinicization of Marxism" before the 18th National Congress of the Chinese Communist Party, including Mao Zedong Thought, Deng Xiaoping Theory, the Three Represents and the Scientific Outlook on Development.

The course accounts for the largest proportion of the ideological and political theory test subjects in China's postgraduate entrance examination. It examines 4 single-choice questions, 5 multiple-choice questions, and 1.5 analysis questions; the Introduction to the Theoretical System of Socialism with Chinese Characteristics is examined as a separate analysis question, and Mao Zedong Thought combined with the Outline of Modern Chinese History is examined as another analysis question.
