= Marxist Theory Research and Construction Project =

Chinese Communist Party initiative

The Marxist Theory Research and Construction Project is a cultural project launched by the Central Committee of the Chinese Communist Party in April 2004 as part of Sinicization of Marxism. One of its important goals is to compile 139 basic theoretical courses and professional core course textbooks that cover the ideological and political theory courses in colleges and universities and the main disciplines of philosophy and social sciences such as Marxist theory, philosophy, political science, law, sociology, economics, literature, history, journalism, education, management, and art. The CCP's Central Propaganda Department is responsible for the specific implementation of the Marxist Project, and the Central Party School, the Central Party History and Literature Research Institute, the Ministry of Education, and the Chinese Academy of Social Sciences are responsible for coordinating.

== History ==
In 2004, the CCP Central Committee held a work conference on the implementation of the Marxist theory research and construction project in Beijing from April 27 to 28. Li Changchun, a member of the Politburo Standing Committee, stressed in his speech that it is necessary to build a discipline system of Marxist theory with the characteristics of the times and compile textbooks for key disciplines of philosophy and social sciences such as philosophy, political science, sociology, law, history, journalism, and literature that fully reflect Mao Zedong Thought, Deng Xiaoping Theory, and Three Represents. Liu Yunshan, head of the Publicity Department, gave a concluding speech at the conference.

In October 2007, the 17th CCP National Congress proposed to promote the research and construction of Marxist theory, to answer major theoretical and practical questions in depth, and to train a group of Marxist theorists, especially young and middle-aged theorists. In October 2011, the sixth plenary session of the 17th CCP Central Committee stressed the need to deepen the research and construction of Marxist theory, strengthen the construction of key disciplines and teaching materials, and promote the theoretical system of socialism with Chinese characteristics into teaching materials, classrooms, and students’ minds. In June 2012, Li Changchun, member of the Politburo Standing Committee, reviewed and summarized the eight-year project work at a project work conference and made new arrangements for further advancing the project.

On October 20, 2013, a symposium on the research and construction of Marxist theory was held in Beijing. Liu Yunshan, member of the Politburo Standing Committee and Member of the Central Secretariat, attended the meeting and delivered a speech. He said that China must conduct in-depth research and interpretation of the historical origins, scientific connotations, spiritual essence and practical requirements of socialism with Chinese characteristics, and further strengthen people's confidence in the path, theory and system. On December 10, 2020, the Marxist Theory Research and Construction Project Work Conference was held in Beijing. Wang Huning, member of the Politburo Standing Committee and a Member of the Central Secretariat, attended the meeting and delivered a speech. He said that China must adhere to the guidance of Xi Jinping Thought on Socialism with Chinese Characteristics for a New Era, strengthen the "four consciousnesses", strengthen the "four self-confidences", and achieve the "two safeguards".

By the end of 2024, the achievements of the Marxist Project include the establishment of 19 research centers for Xi Jinping Thought on Socialism with Chinese Characteristics for a New Era, the selection of 43 national key Marxist colleges, the growth of the number of Marxist colleges from less than 10 at the beginning of the project to more than 2,000, the establishment of 453 "big ideological and political courses" practical teaching bases, the inclusion of Marxist theory disciplines in 13 universities in the " Double First-Class " construction, and the widespread use of more than 110 "Marxist Project" key liberal arts textbooks in universities.

== Content ==
In terms of compilation, the 10-volume "Collected Works of Marx and Engels" and the 5-volume "Collected Works of Lenin" were published in December 2009. In 2011, based on these works, the "Selected Works of Marxist-Leninist Classics (Reading Book for Party Members and Cadres)" and the "Study Guide to the Selected Works of Marxist-Leninist Classics" were launched.

In terms of textbook compilation, key courses are published in batches, including undergraduate ideological and political theory textbooks "Introduction to Mao Zedong Thought and the Theoretical System of Socialism with Chinese Characteristics", "Introduction to the Basic Principles of Marxism", "Outline of Modern Chinese History", and "Ideological and Moral Cultivation and Legal Basis", and graduate ideological and political theory course syllabus "Research on the Theory and Practice of Socialism with Chinese Characteristics" and "Chinese Marxism and the Contemporary Era". Key textbooks for professional courses include "Marxist Philosophy", "Introduction to Marxist Political Economy", "Introduction to Scientific Socialism", "Introduction to Political Science", "Jurisprudence", "Introduction to Sociology", "Introduction to Journalism", "Literary Theory", "Introduction to Historiography", "Constitutional Law", "History of Marxist Philosophy", "Introduction to the Classic Works of Philosophy of Marx, Engels and Lenin", "Introduction to the Classic Works of Historical Theory of Marx, Engels and Lenin", "History of the International Communist Movement", "History of Western Political Thought", "History of Western Philosophy", "Western Economics", "Introduction to World Economy", "Modern Chinese History", "History of Chinese Political Thought", "History of Chinese Philosophy", "Ethics", "History of the People's Republic of China", AND "Political Work in the Army".

In terms of discipline construction, Marxist theory was set as a first-level discipline, with six second-level disciplines, namely, basic principles of Marxism, history of the development of Marxism, Chinese Marxism, foreign Marxism, and ideological and political education. The CCP's Central Party School established a Department of Basic Theory of Marxism, the Chinese Academy of Social Sciences established an Institute of Marxism, and many universities established schools of Marxism.
