= Learn from Lei Feng's Good Example =

Chinese song praising Lei Feng

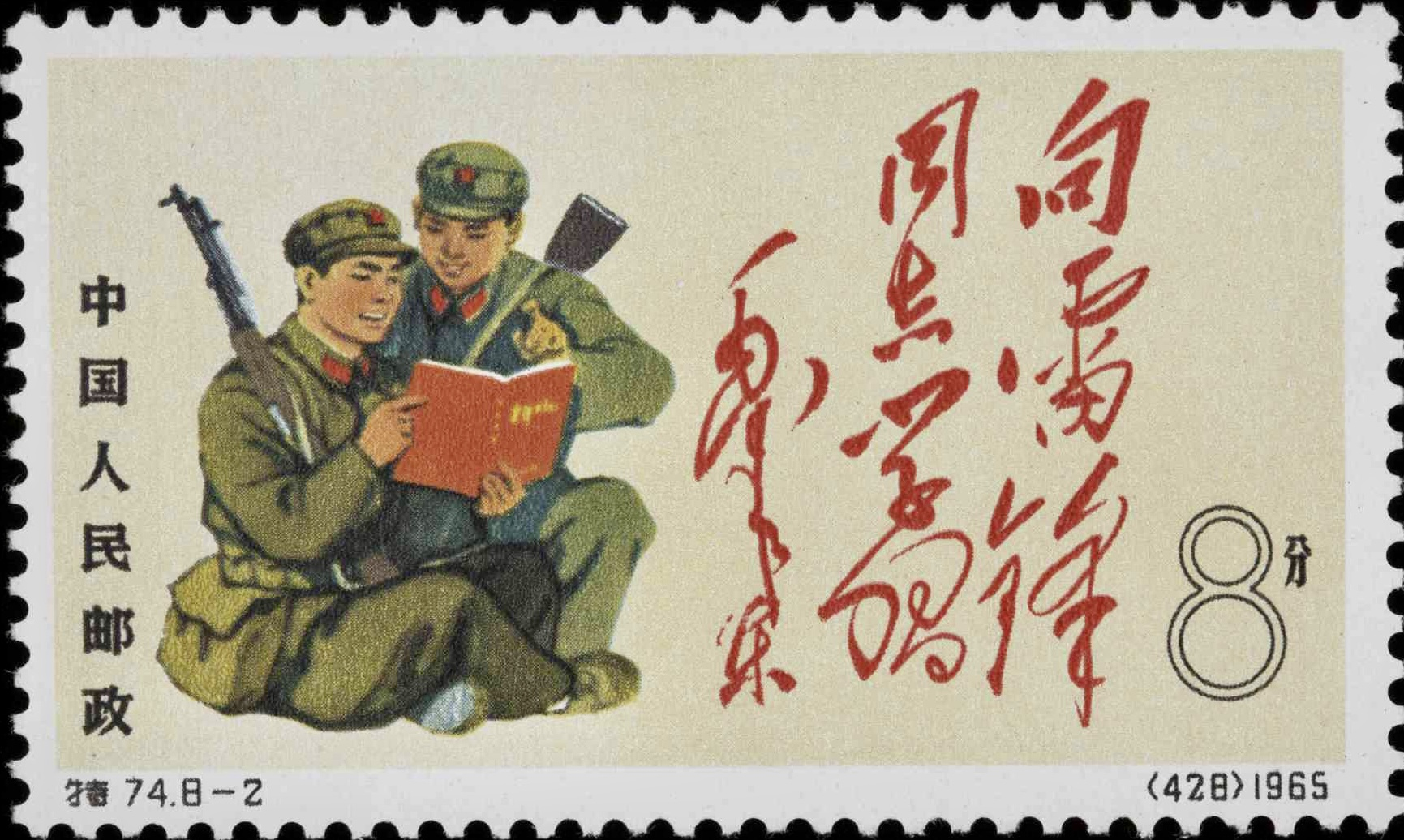
A Stamp depicting Lei, 1965

Learn from Lei Feng's Good Example (Simpified Chinese: 学习雷锋好榜样. Pinyin: Xuéxí Léi Fēng Hǎo Bǎngyàng) is a Chinese song in praise of Lei Feng, created as part of 1963 propaganda campaign "Follow the examples of Comrade Lei Feng." Lei Feng was an automobile squad leader in the People's Liberation Army and a member of the Chinese Communist Party. He is considered a model of selflessness, and his diary was published posthumously in 1963. Lei died in 1962 after being hit by a wooden pole in an accident caused by another soldier.

== Origin ==
On the 5th of March, 1963, a call to "Learn from Comrade Lei Feng" was made by then-Chairman of the Chinese Communist Party Mao Zedong and published in the People's Daily and the People's Liberation Army Daily. That morning, the Beijing Military Region Comrades-in-arms Literary Troupe held a meeting at which a song to be sung during the day's activities on Tiananmen Square was proposed. This proposal was unanimously agreed upon, and the troupe entrusted troupe members Sheng Mao and Hong Yuan to write it. Sheng Mao told Hong Yuan to have the song done by lunch.

The song was rehearsed on the journey to Tiananmen Square, where it was performed with accordion accompaniment.
