= School of Marxism =

Type of academic institution in China

- Simplified Chinese: 马克思主义学院
- Traditional Chinese: 馬克思主義學院
Transcriptions
Standard Mandarin
- Hanyu Pinyin: Mǎkèsīzhǔyì Xuéyuàn

School of Marxism is a type of academic institution in universities and colleges in China. It is a secondary school and is mainly engaged in the Chinese Communist Party's ideological and political education and research in the humanities and social sciences.

== History ==
After the founding of the People's Republic of China in 1949, the Chinese Communist Party (CCP) successively established institutions with similar names such as "Marxism-Leninism Teaching and Research Section", "Marxism–Leninism Teaching and Research Section", "Marxism-Leninism Basics Teaching and Research Section", "Chinese Revolution History Teaching and Research Section" in major universities. These institutions later evolved into institutions with similar names such as "Institute of the History of the Development of Marxism–Leninism", "Institute of Marxist Theory Education", "Department of CCP History", "Ideological and Political College", "Ideological and Political Education College", and "Ideological and Political Theory College".

In 1992, Peking University established the first "School of Marxism" in China, namely the School of Marxism at Peking University. In 1996, the School of Marxism at Renmin University of China was established, becoming the second School of Marxism. After 2003, Hunan University, Minzu University of China, Jishou University, Southwestern University of Finance and Economics, Jilin University and other universities established Schools of Marxism. As of 2007, 25 Schools of Marxism had been established in universities across China.

In 2008, the School of Marxism at Tsinghua University and the School of Marxism at Beijing Normal University were established. In 2009, the School of Marxism at Shaanxi Normal University was established. In 2015, the School of Marxism at Sichuan University was established. By the end of 2014, there were 200 schools of Marxism established in universities across the country, and by the end of 2016, the number had exceeded 400.

Starting from 2016, national key Marxist colleges were established in batches. From 2015 to 2025, the number of Marxist study institutions in Chinese universities increased from 100 to more than 1,400.

== See also ==
- National Key School of Marxism
- Ideology of the Chinese Communist Party
