= Introduction to Xi Jinping Thought on Socialism with Chinese Characteristics for a New Era =

Chinese Communist Party textbook

- Original title: 习近平新时代中国特色社会主义思想概论
- Language: Mandarin Chinese
- Genre: Ideological and political education
- Publisher: People's Publishing House; People's Education Press
- Publication date: August 2023
- Publication place: Mainland China
- Media type: Print (Hardcover, Paperback)
- Pages: 367
- ISBN: 9787040610536

Introduction to Xi Jinping Thought on Socialism with Chinese Characteristics for a New Era is a political course for students in colleges and universities in the People's Republic of China (PRC). It is also the name of the textbook used in this course, which studies Xi Jinping Thought.

== History ==
In 2021, the National Textbook Committee formulated the "Guidelines for Incorporating Xi Jinping Thought on Socialism with Chinese Characteristics for a New Era into Course Textbooks".

In 2023, the Publicity Department of the Chinese Communist Party and the Ministry of Education organized the compilation of "An Introduction to Xi Jinping Thought on Socialism with Chinese Characteristics for a New Era", which was jointly published by Higher Education Press and People's Publishing House and distributed nationwide on August 28 of the same year. The book consists of an introduction, 17 chapters and a conclusion. In August 2023, the book was added as a textbook for ideological and political education in colleges and universities.
