= Morality and the Rule of Law =

Mandatory school subject in China

- Simplified Chinese: 道德与法治
- Traditional Chinese: 道德與法治
Transcriptions
Standard Mandarin
- Hanyu Pinyin: Dàodé yǔ Fǎzhì

Second alternative Chinese name
- Chinese: 道法
Transcriptions
Standard Mandarin
- Hanyu Pinyin: Dàofǎ

Morality and the Rule of Law is a subject in the compulsory education of the People's Republic of China, offered from grade 1 to grade 9. The subject mainly focuses on individuals, families, schools, society, the country, and the world, including morality, law, politics and national conditions. It is part of the Chinese Communist Party's ideological and political education.

== History ==
Since 1992, China has adjusted its ideological education curriculum, establishing "Morality and Life" courses in grades 1 and 2 of primary school, "Morality and Society" courses in grades 3 to 6 of primary school, "Ideology and Morality" courses in junior high school, and "Ideology and Politics" courses in high school.

In 2016, the Ministry of Education announced the adjustment of the ideological and political education curriculum in primary and secondary schools, merging the three courses of "Morality and Life" (primary school grades 1 to 2), "Morality and Society" (primary school grades 3 to 6), and "Ideology and Morality" (junior high school stage) in the compulsory education stage into a unified "Morality and the Rule of Law", while the high school course was still called "Ideology and Politics". "Morality and the Rule of Law" adopts the national unified textbook compiled by the Ministry of Education (called the "Ministry Edition" or "Uniform Edition"). Compared with the previous ideological and political curriculum, "Morality and the Rule of Law" has significantly increased the content of legal education, emphasizing the Constitution. The sixth grade first volume (for the May Fourth school system, the fifth grade second volume) and the eighth grade second volume are also listed as "legal education special volumes". These changes echo the basic strategy of "rule of law" promotion in mainland China.

== Content ==
=== Primary school ===
According to the curriculum standards, in the lower grades of primary school, Morality and the Rule of Law curriculum focuses on moral education, aiming to cultivate good behavioral habits, develop good morals, and establish a love of life attitude. In the upper grades, the content focuses on social life, including patriotism, collectivism, history and culture and geographical environment.

=== Junior high school ===
According to the curriculum standards, the Morality and the Rule of Law course at the junior high school level covers personal development, morality, mental health, law and national conditions. Its main purpose is to "promote the further development of moral qualities, legal awareness, and civic awareness, to form an optimistic attitude towards life, and to establish a correct outlook on life, values, and world view". It mainly focuses on three parts:

1. "Growing Me": Focuses on personal development, including self-awareness, self-esteem, and the law in mind. It includes the physical and mental changes during adolescence, respect for life, emotions, and understanding of the law.
2. "Me, others and the collective": Emphasis on collectivism, as well as communication with others
3. "I and the Country and Society": mainly includes society, national conditions, patriotism, etc. (usually more difficult than the first two parts)
