= Four Consciousnesses =

Chinese Communist Party slogan

The Four Consciousnesses (Chinese: 四个意识) is a political concept first proposed by Chinese Communist Party (CCP) General Secretary Xi Jinping in January 2016. The concept forms part of the core of the curriculum of the mandatory ideological instruction "Situation and Policy" classes in higher education.

== History ==
The Four Consciousnesses concept was first proposed on 29 January 2016 at a meeting of the CCP Politburo.

== Concepts ==
The concept includes:

1. Political consciousness (政治意识)
2. Consciousness of the overall situation (大局意识)
3. Consciousness of the core (核心意识)
4. Compliance consciousness (看齐意识)

== See also ==
- Ideology of the Chinese Communist Party
