= Type 55 (military uniforms) =

Chinese People's Liberation Army uniform

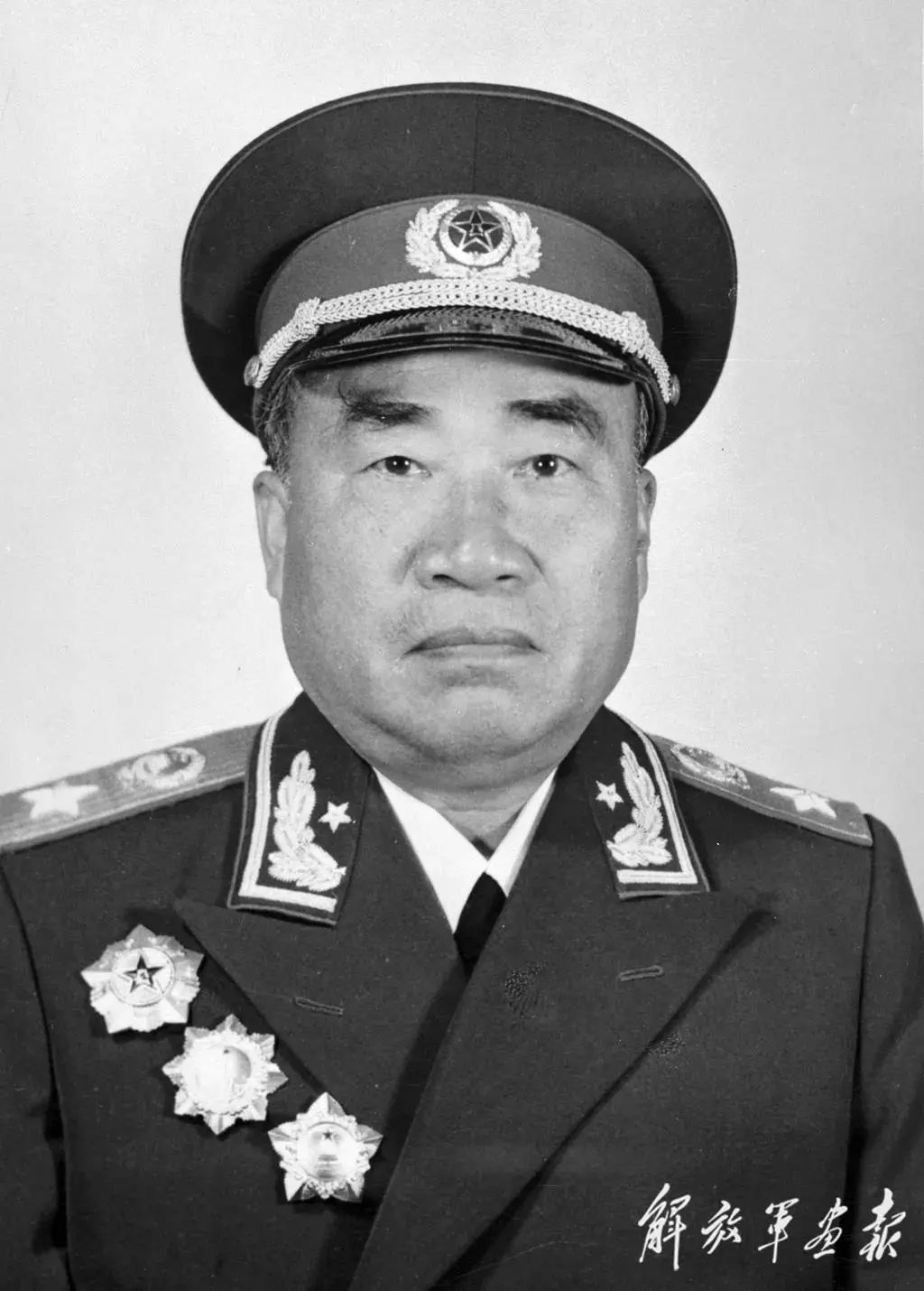
Marshal Zhu De in a 55-style marshal's dress

Type 55 uniforms (Chinese: 中国人民解放军55式军服) of the People's Liberation Army were introduced and issued to the PLA in 1955. It was the second generation of standardized uniforms used by the PLA and the first uniform in the PLA's history to display ranks and branches of service. Because it was officially adopted in 1955, it is called the Type 55 uniform.

== Overview ==
In 1955, with the end of the Korean War and the gradual recovery and stabilization of the economy of the People's Republic of China, the People's Liberation Army decided to implement a rank system, a salary system, and a conscription system. Based on this, a large-scale uniform replacement was carried out, and the materials and styles of the new uniforms were comprehensively reformed. The design of the new uniforms referenced the Soviet Type 54 uniforms and combined them with the traditional uniform styles and wearing habits of the People's Liberation Army. At the same time, a set of rank insignia, branch symbols, and decorative items were designed in imitation of the Soviet style. After approval by the State Council of the People's Republic of China, the Ministry of National Defense of the People's Republic of China ordered the People's Liberation Army to start replacing the new uniforms on October 1, 1955. The Type 55 uniforms were divided into dress uniforms and service uniforms. This was the first time that the People's Liberation Army had equipped itself with a non-single style uniform. Clothing Dress uniforms Dress uniforms were mainly issued to officers and military bands, honor guards, cultural troupes, and sports teams for formal occasions and foreign visits. The dress uniforms for officers and soldiers at all levels are different, mainly divided into the dress uniforms for marshals, field officers, junior officers, honor guards, and the white dress uniforms for naval junior officers and sailors. The dress uniforms are made of pure wool gabardine.

== Marshal Dress Uniform ==
The marshal dress uniform features a double-breasted six-button suit jacket with a lapel, and trousers. Both the jacket and trousers are navy blue. (The navy jacket is dark blue.) The collar and cuffs are decorated with pine branches and gold five-pointed stars embroidered with metal wire. The marshal and grand marshal dress uniforms have an additional circle of pine branches embroidered outside the five-pointed stars. The trouser seams are decorated with red piping. The inner lining is a white shirt with a black tie (Female officers wear skirts).

== Field Officer Dress Uniform ==
The field officer dress uniform is the same style as the marshal dress uniform, except that the five-pointed stars embroidered with metal wire are removed from the collar and cuffs, leaving only pine branches. Junior Officer Dress

The junior officer dress consists of a stand-up collar, single-breasted, six-button blouse, and loose-fitting trousers. The collar is embroidered with gold pine branches at both ends. The colors are brownish-green for the Army, navy blue for the Navy, and brownish-green for the Air Force and navy blue for the Air Force. (Female junior officers wear skirts.)

== Naval Junior Officer White Dress ==
The blouse consists of a stand-up collar, single-breasted, five-button blouse, and loose-fitting trousers in white.

== Navy sailor dress uniform ==
The upper garment is a pullover shawl, and the lower garment is a loose-fitting tunic. Both the upper and lower garments are white, while the shawl is blue and white striped.

== Cultural troupe, sports team, military band, and honor guard dress uniform ==
Cultural troupe, sports team, military band, and honor guard dress uniform The upper garment has a stand-up collar. The color for the army is brownish-green, while for the navy, the summer upper garment is white and the lower garment is dark blue. In winter, both the upper and lower garments are dark blue. (The navy honor guard dress uniform is the same as the sailor dress uniform.) The air force upper garment is brownish-green and the lower garment is dark blue.

== Holiday dress uniforms, formal dress uniforms) ==
Number Two and Number Three dress uniforms (Holiday dress uniforms, formal dress uniforms) are the same as ordinary dress uniforms, with silver buttons. They are only issued to generals and marshals. The holiday dress uniforms for the army and air force are grayish-blue, while those for the navy are dark blue. The decorations for Number Two and Number Three dress uniforms remove the gold five-pointed star from the ordinary dress uniforms. The No. 3 dress was based on the No. 2 dress, but the fabric was changed to pure wool serge to make it easier to wear in summer.

== Service Uniform ==
=== Officer Service Uniform ===
All officers' service uniforms feature a stand-up collar (women's summer service uniforms have a small notched collar) and a single row of five brown buttons. (Navy white service uniforms have silver buttons). The lower garment is trousers with open legs; cavalry, armored troops, and paratroopers wear breeches. In terms of color, marshals and army officers wear brown jackets and trousers; the navy wears white jackets and navy blue trousers in summer, and navy blue jackets and trousers in winter. Air Force officers wear brown jackets and navy blue trousers. Marshals and generals also receive separate white service uniforms. The fabric of officers' summer service uniforms varies by rank: marshals and generals wear pure wool serge; field officers wear tussah silk; and junior officers wear cotton twill for both summer and winter. The fabric of officers' winter service uniforms varies by rank: marshals and generals wear pure wool breeches; field officers wear pure wool Melton wool; and junior officers wear cotton twill.

== Soldiers' uniforms ==
The winter uniforms for soldiers of the Army, Air Force and Navy are stand-up collar, single-breasted five-button uniforms, and the summer uniforms for soldiers on Navy ships and on land are sailor uniforms. In terms of color, the Army is brown, the Navy is white in summer and navy blue in winter, and the Air Force is brown in jacket and navy blue in trousers. In terms of fabric, the Army and Air Force soldiers and Navy ground service soldiers wear cotton twill in summer and winter, and Navy ship soldiers wear woolen sailor uniforms in winter.

== Overcoat ==
=== Officer's overcoat ===
Officer's overcoat is a double-breasted overcoat with a lapel, divided into ordinary overcoat and lined overcoat (issued only to officers of the rank of colonel and above). Ordinary overcoats are brown for the Army and Air Force, and navy blue for the Navy. Lined overcoats are all blue-gray. Fabric is differentiated by rank: Marshal, general, and colonel wear pure wool cavalry breeches, while junior officers wear cotton twill. Marshal, general, and colonel officers also wear pure wool Melton lined overcoats.

=== Soldier's overcoat ===
Soldier's overcoat is a double-breasted overcoat with a stand-up lapel. It is brown for the Army and Air Force, and navy blue for the Navy. The fabric used is plain cotton fabric.

== Military Caps ==
=== Dress Caps ===
Officer dress caps are peaked caps (female officers wear brimless caps). The top of the dress cap for marshals and army generals is navy blue, the band is red, and there are red piping above and below the cap. The top of the naval cap is dark blue, the band is black, and the piping is white. The top of the air force cap is navy blue, and the band and piping are sky blue. All generals' dress caps have wire bands and gold rivets. The top and band of the dress cap for army field officers are navy blue, and the piping is red. The top and band of the dress cap for navy field officers are dark blue, and the piping is white. The top and band of the dress cap for air force field officers are navy blue, and the piping is sky blue. The dress cap for army junior officers is brown, and the piping is red. The dress cap for navy junior officers is dark blue, and the piping is white. The dress cap for air force junior officers is brown, and the piping is navy blue. The dress caps for men in the cultural troupe, sports team, military band, and honor guard are peaked caps (the naval honor guard wears sailor caps), while women wear brimless caps. Army caps are brown with red piping. Navy peaked caps have white tops in summer and navy blue in winter, with navy blue bands. Sailor caps have white tops in summer and navy blue in winter, with navy blue bands and the words "Chinese People's Liberation Army Navy" printed in gold. Air Force caps are brown with sky blue piping.

=== Service Caps ===
Officers' service caps are all peaked caps (female officers wear brimless caps). Army caps are brownish-green with red piping. Navy caps have white tops in summer and navy blue in winter, with navy blue bands and white piping. Air Force caps are brown with sky blue piping. Generals and marshals wear wire chinstraps, while field and lieutenant officers wear black chinstraps.

Army and Air Force soldiers' caps are boat-shaped caps (later changed to liberation caps) in brown. The navy wears a sailor's cap, the same style as a dress cap.

In winter, generals and marshals wear winter leather caps, field officers and enlisted men wear fur-lined caps, marshals and the Army and Air Force wear brown caps with brown fur trim, and the navy wears navy blue caps with brown fur trim.

== Decoration ==
=== Type 55 shoulder boards ===
Type 55 shoulder boards are divided into three types: dress uniform shoulder boards (overcoat shoulder boards), service uniform shoulder boards, and wartime shoulder boards. They are designed based on the Soviet style. The background color of ordinary shoulder boards is gold, the background color of technical officers is silver (cancelled in 1958), and the background color of wartime shoulder boards is green (which has been destroyed). The borders and vertical lines of the shoulder boards are changed according to the branch of service. The army is red, the navy is black, the naval aviation and the air force are blue.

=== Type 55 Collar Insignia ===
The Type 55 collar insignia consists of officer collar insignia, cadet collar insignia, and soldier collar insignia. Both types are diamond-shaped. Officer collar insignia indicate the branch of service, while soldier collar insignia indicate both branch of service and rank. The background color also differs: red for the army, black for the navy, and blue for naval aviators and air force personnel. Cadet collar insignia have a gold horizontal bar to indicate their rank.

==== Officer Collar Insignia ====
Officer collar insignia differ according to rank. Marshals and generals have gold borders on their collar insignia. Marshals' collar insignia do not indicate branch of service and only feature a round emblem of the People's Republic of China with a gold background. Generals and field officers have their branch of service insignia in the center. Naval field officers have white borders in their winter collar insignia.

==== Soldier collar insignia ====
They were also divided into those for enlisted personnel and those for non-commissioned officers. Army and Air Force non-commissioned officers have a gold horizontal bar at the bottom of their collar insignia to distinguish them. Navy enlisted personnel wear sailor uniforms, so their rank is indicated by shoulder boards.

=== Type 55 Cap Badge ===
The basic design of the Type 55 Army uniform cap badge is the August 1st Army emblem, with wheat ears and gears around and at the bottom. The Navy added an anchor at the bottom, while the Air Force added wings. The generals' dress cap badges were decorated with pine branches, while the field officers' and soldiers' dress cap badges were the same as those for regular uniforms.

=== Type 55 branch insignia ===
The Type 55 military uniform began to use symbols to distinguish branches of service. Officers' branch insignia were gold, while soldiers and cadets' were silver.

=== Type 55 Military Uniform Buttons ===
The Type 55 military uniform buttons came in both dress uniform and formal uniform styles. The button designs also varied, and the colors changed to match different uniform colors.
