= Situation and Policy =

Chinese Communist Party political education

- Simplified Chinese: 形势与政策
- Traditional Chinese: 形勢與政策
Transcriptions
Standard Mandarin
- Hanyu Pinyin: Xíngshì yǔ zhèngcè

Situation and Policy is a course related to ideology of the Chinese Communist Party offered in higher education institutions in the People's Republic of China. The total number of class hours for situation and policy offered by all institutions of higher learning is no less than 8 hours, and the credits are no less than 2 points. It is currently one of the required undergraduate courses in universities.

== History ==
In May 1987, the Central Committee of the Chinese Communist Party's "Decision on Improving and Strengthening Ideological and Political Work in Institutions of Higher Learning" said that that in order to enable students to support the Chinese Communist Party (CCP) and understand the line, principles and policies of the CCP, situation and policy education should be carried out. In October of the same year, the State Education Commission issued the "Opinions on the Establishment of Ideological Education Courses in Institutions of Higher Learning", stipulating that situation and policy courses are one of the compulsory courses in ideological education courses in institutions of higher learning. In October 1996, the State Education Commission issued the "Opinions on Further Strengthening the Construction of Situation and Policy Courses in Institutions of Higher Learning", requiring that situation and policy courses should be guaranteed to have an average of no less than one class hour per week, implement a school year assessment system, and the results should be included in the student transcript.

During the Xi Jinping administration, the Chinese Communist Party expected courses to adapt to teach more on Xi Jinping Thought.

== See also ==
- Ideological and political education
- Patriotic education in China
