= Sinicization of Marxism =

Chinese Communist Party ideology

The Sinicization of Marxism (Chinese: 马克思主义中国化; pinyin: Mǎkèsīzhǔyì Zhōngguó Huà) is a Chinese Communist Party (CCP) ideological concept that proposes to adapt (or "Sinicize") Marxism to China's national conditions, Chinese culture and history.

== History ==
Mao Zedong first used the term in October 1938 in his political report On the New Stage at the sixth plenary session of the 6th Central Committee of the CCP. Through the Sinicization of Marxism, Mao sought to adapt the ideological discourse and organizational methods of Marxism–Leninism in a concrete way for China's revolution. According to Mao, "[I]n applying Marxism to China, Chinese communists must fully and properly integrate the universal truth of Marxism with the concrete practice of the Chinese Revolution ... the universal truth of Marxism must have a national form before it can be useful, and in no circumstances can it be applied subjectively and formulaically as a mere formula." He added "the history of this great nation of ours goes back several thousand years. It has its own laws of development [and] its own national characteristics" and these characteristics must be implemented to the program of the Chinese communists because even though a "a communist is a Marxist internationalist…. Marxism must take on a national form before it can be put into practice".

Chen Boda had previously used the phrase "Sinification of Marxism" to refer to the idea that cadres should systemically critique traditional philosophy, "enrich" dialectical materialism by "concretizing" it in the Chinese context, and synthesize nationalism with proletarian internationalism. This was a partial precursor to Mao's use of the phrase.

After Deng Xiaoping started reform and opening up in December 1978, the Sinicization of Marxism began to be associated with the socialist market economy system and socialism with Chinese characteristics. Deng said that "We firmly believe in Marxism, but Marxism must be combined with Chinese realities. Only Marxism that is integrated with China's realities is the genuine Marxism we need."

In 2004, the CCP launched the Marxist Theory Research and Construction Project, and Peking University began to hold the World Congress of Marxism in 2015, attempting to present China as the center of contemporary Marxist research.

Xi Jinping expresses the principle of the "Two Combinations," which calls for the Sinification of socialist theory by combining it with "China's specific reality" and "China's excellent traditional culture". In November 2021, the sixth plenary session of the 19th CCP Central Committee stated out that "Xi Jinping Thought on Socialism with Chinese Characteristics for a New Era has achieved a new leap in the Sinicization of Marxism".

Many political textbooks in Chinese universities say that "the history of the Chinese Communist Party is the history of the Sinicization of Marxism".

== See also ==
- Chinese Marxist philosophy
- Sinicization
