= Ideological and political education =

Education subject in China

- Chinese: 思想政治教育
Transcriptions
Standard Mandarin
- Hanyu Pinyin: Sīxiǎng Zhèngzhì Jiàoyù

Second alternative Chinese name
- Chinese: 思想政治
Transcriptions
Standard Mandarin
- Hanyu Pinyin: Sīxiǎng Zhèngzhì

Third alternative Chinese name
- Chinese: 思政
Transcriptions
Standard Mandarin
- Hanyu Pinyin: Sīzhèng

Fourth alternative Chinese name
- Chinese: 政教
Transcriptions
Standard Mandarin
- Hanyu Pinyin: Zhèngjiào

Ideological and political education is a common subject related to the ideology of the Chinese Communist Party (CCP) in higher education in the People's Republic of China. It is called Morality and the Rule of Law in compulsory education and Ideological and Politics in high school education. It is closely related to the CCP's patriotic education campaigns. The Schools of Marxism of major universities in China have ideological and political education majors and courses, many of which are compulsory courses for students in other colleges.

== History ==
In the early days of the People's Republic of China, the development of education was based on the Soviet model, including the political theory courses. The Soviet education system was suitable for the political and ideological control, ideological cultivation and indoctrination, and economic system characteristics of the country when it was first established. The Chinese Communist Party (CCP) opposed the civic education implemented by the Nationalist government, which included traditional ethics, and opposed the New Life Movement. Chairman Liu Shaoqi said that the ideological and political education of the CCP is to "arm the intellectuals and the masses with socialist and Marxist–Leninist ideas and criticize feudal and capitalist ideas." In December 1949, the First National Education Work Conference formally decided to offer political courses Marxism–Leninism in secondary schools and above to provide students with "revolutionary ideological and political education."

The first National Conference on Higher Education held in June 1950 clearly emphasized that "our colleges and universities should carry out revolutionary political education, eliminate feudal, comprador and fascist ideas, and develop the idea of serving the people." Political theory courses were regarded as "the foundation of all professional education" and emphasized that "ideological and political education should be carried out through teaching in all subjects." CCP Chairman Mao Zedong proposed "learning from Russia", saying: "We oppose the Chiang Kai-shek reactionaries who have sided with imperialism, and we also oppose the illusion of a third way."

In 1953, the Ministry of Higher Education issued a notice requiring all colleges and universities to add a course called Basics of Marxism–Leninism for a total of 136 hours, thus establishing the curriculum system for ideological and political education in Chinese colleges and universities. Many teaching syllabuses were slightly modified from the syllabus compiled in 1952 based on the Soviet syllabus. During this period, the textbooks for ideological and political courses in mainland China were mainly Quotations from Marx, Engels, Lenin and Stalin, Study of Soviet Political Economy, Joseph Stalin's History of the Communist Party of the Soviet Union (Bolsheviks), Ai Siqi's Outline of Lectures on Historical Materialism - History of Social Development (Revised Edition) and Konstantin Ostrovityanov's An Outline of Political Economy: Political Economy and Soviet Economics.

In 1957, the CCP Central Committee launched a big-speaking and big-listing" campaign, and all political courses in colleges and universities were suspended except for Socialist Education. The course was guided by Mao's works and studied chapter by chapter based on the 12 "sub-topics" of On the Correct Handling of Contradictions Among the People. From then on, the ideological and political education in schools "took class struggle as the main course", emphasizing that the method of class struggle should be used to analyze and deal with problems at all times and in all matters, and became a socialist education course that obeyed and served the "three red flags". In 1966, with the beginning of the Cultural Revolution, colleges and universities stopped recruiting students. All courses were suspended. In 1971, when colleges and universities resumed classes for workers, peasants and soldiers, political classes mainly focused on explaining four works of Karl Marx and Vladimir Lenin, including The Communist Manifesto by Marx and Engels and The State and Revolution by Lenin, as well as works by Mao Zedong. It was not until 1978 that politics courses were fully resumed.

=== Reform and opening up ===
In 1980, after the start of the reform and opening up, the Ministry of Education and the Central Committee of the Communist Youth League of China issued a joint notice on "Opinions on Strengthening Ideological and Political Work for College Students", leading colleges and universities to begin offering the course Marxist–Leninist Theory. In the 1980s, the Chinese government began to downplay ideological and political education courses. After the 1989 Tiananmen square protests and massacre, the importance of ideological education courses was strengthened again.

In 1992, the ideological and political curriculum was adjusted in primary and secondary schools across the country. The first and second graders in primary schools were given the course Morality and Life, the third to sixth graders in primary schools were given the course Morality and Society, the junior high school was given the course Ideology and Morality, and the high school was given the course Ideology and Politics. In 1998, the ideological and political courses in colleges and universities were also adjusted, with seven or six compulsory courses being offered: Principles of Marxist Philosophy, Principles of Marxist Political Economy, Introduction to Mao Zedong Thought, Introduction to Deng Xiaoping Theory and the Important Thought of the 'Three Represents'. Contemporary World Economy and Politics" (offered to liberal arts students), Ideological and Moral Cultivation, and Legal Foundations. There is also a course on Situation and Policy.

In 2004, the ideological and political courses were changed to include Basic Principles of Marxism, Introduction to Mao Zedong Thought, Deng Xiaoping Theory and the Important Thought of the 'Three Represents', Outline of Modern Chinese History, and Ideological and Moral Cultivation and Legal Basis. In October 2004, the CCP Central Committee and the State Council issued the Opinion on Further Strengthening and Improvement of Ideological and Political Education for College, which said "strengthening and improving the ideological and political education of college students is an extremely urgent and important" and "raising their ideological and political character" was necessary to "cultivate them into the builders and successors of the socialist cause with Chinese characteristics". In 2007, the ideological and political courses were further adjusted to Basic Principles of Marxism, Introduction to Mao Zedong Thought and the Theoretical System of Socialism with Chinese Characteristics, Outline of Modern Chinese History, and Ideological and Moral Cultivation and Legal Basis.

Ideological and political education increased under the leadership of CCP General Secretary Xi Jinping. From 1994 to 2021, of the nearly 766 mentions in the People's Daily through its history of the term sizheng, a term that was not common until the late 2000s, 700 came during the under the leadership of Xi. In 2014, Shanghai universities began to explore and practice the new concept of "ideological and political education course". The National Ideological and Political Work Conference held in Beijing in December 2016 described this concept by saying "ideological and political education course" is not a specific course or a specific type of course, but an educational and teaching concept and way of thinking. In 2016, the Ministry of Education announced changes to the ideological and political curriculum for primary and secondary schools, merging the three compulsory education courses of Morality and Life (grades 1 to 2), Morality and Society (grades 3 to 6), and Ideology and Morality (junior high school) into a unified Morality and the Rule of Law, while the high school course were still called Ideology and Politics. In 2018, the ideological and political course added the Situation and Policy, which was expressed in the postgraduate entrance examination political outline as Situation and Policy and Contemporary World Economy and Politics.

In 2019, the General Office of the CCP Central Committee and the General Office of the State Council issued the "Several Opinions on Deepening the Reform and Innovation of Ideological and Political Theory Courses in Schools in the New Era", which required the improvement of the ideological and political course curriculum and teaching materials system, the construction of a team of ideological and political course teachers with strong political awareness, deep feelings, new thinking, broad vision, strict self-discipline and positive personality, the continuous enhancement of the ideological, theoretical, affinity and pertinence of ideological and political courses, and the strengthening of the party's leadership over the construction of ideological and political courses.

In May 2020, the Ministry of Education issued the "Guidelines for the Construction of Ideological and Political Courses in Colleges and Universities", which clarified the important position of ideological and political courses and put forward specific requirements. On 1 September 2020, General Secretary Xi Jinping published an article in the magazine Qiushi, saying that ideological and political courses are necessary courses for cultivating generations of useful talents who support the leadership of the Chinese Communist Party. In 2021, the Ministry of Education organized the compilation of the Outline for the Study of Xi Jinping Thought on Socialism with Chinese Characteristics for a New Era for primary, secondary and high schools. Starting from the fall semester of 2021, primary and secondary schools across the country began to use the textbook. In August 2023, the Introduction to Xi Jinping Thought on Socialism with Chinese Characteristics for a New Era was added as a textbook for ideological and political education in colleges and universities.

== Curriculum ==
Moral education and political education are compulsory courses for primary and secondary school students on the mainland. The teaching of moral education and political education is guided by the education administrative departments of local people's governments at all levels.

Education level	Course
Compulsory education (primary school, junior high school)	Morality and the Rule of Law, Outline for the Study of Xi Jinping Thought on Socialism with Chinese Characteristics for a New Era (Primary and Junior High School)
High school	Ideology and Politics, Outline for the Study of Xi Jinping Thought on Socialism with Chinese Characteristics for a New Era (High School)
Vocational school	Introduction to Xi Jinping Thought on Socialism with Chinese Characteristics for a New Era, Introduction to Mao Zedong Thought and the Theoretical System of Socialism with Chinese Characteristics, Ideological & Moral Cultivation and Fundamentals of Law, Situation and Policy
Undergraduate	Introduction to Xi Jinping Thought on Socialism with Chinese Characteristics for a New Era, Introduction to Basic Principles of Marxism, Introduction to Mao Zedong Thought and the Theoretical System of Socialism with Chinese Characteristics, The Modern and Contemporary History of China, Ideological Morality and Rule by Law, Situation and Policy, Outline for the Study of Xi Jinping Thought on Socialism with Chinese Characteristics for a New Era (University)
Masters	Theory and Practice of Socialism with Chinese Characteristics (compulsory), An Introduction to Dialectics of Nature (elective), Marxism and Method of Social Sciences (elective)
Doctor of Philosophy	Chinese Marxism and Contemporary Era (compulsory) Selected Readings of Marx, Engels and Lenin's Philosophical Works (elective)

== College major ==
Education in Ideology and Politics is also a major offered by Chinese universities, usually in the Schools of Marxism. In China, this major belongs to the "Marxist theory" major category, which belongs to the law category (in addition to law, this category also includes political science, sociology and other majors), and awards Bachelor of Laws (LL.B.), Master of Laws (LL.M.), and Doctor of Laws (LL.D.).

== See also ==
- Ideology of the Chinese Communist Party
- School of Marxism
