= People's Education Press =

Chinese state publisher

- Parent company: China Education Publishing and Media Group (Ministry of Education of China）
- Founded: December 1, 1950; 75 years ago
- Country of origin: China
- Headquarters location: No. 17, South Street, Zhongguancun, Haidian District, Beijing
- Publication types: Textbooks, workbooks, and teaching and research magazines for primary and secondary schools in mainland China
- Official website: www.pep.com.cn

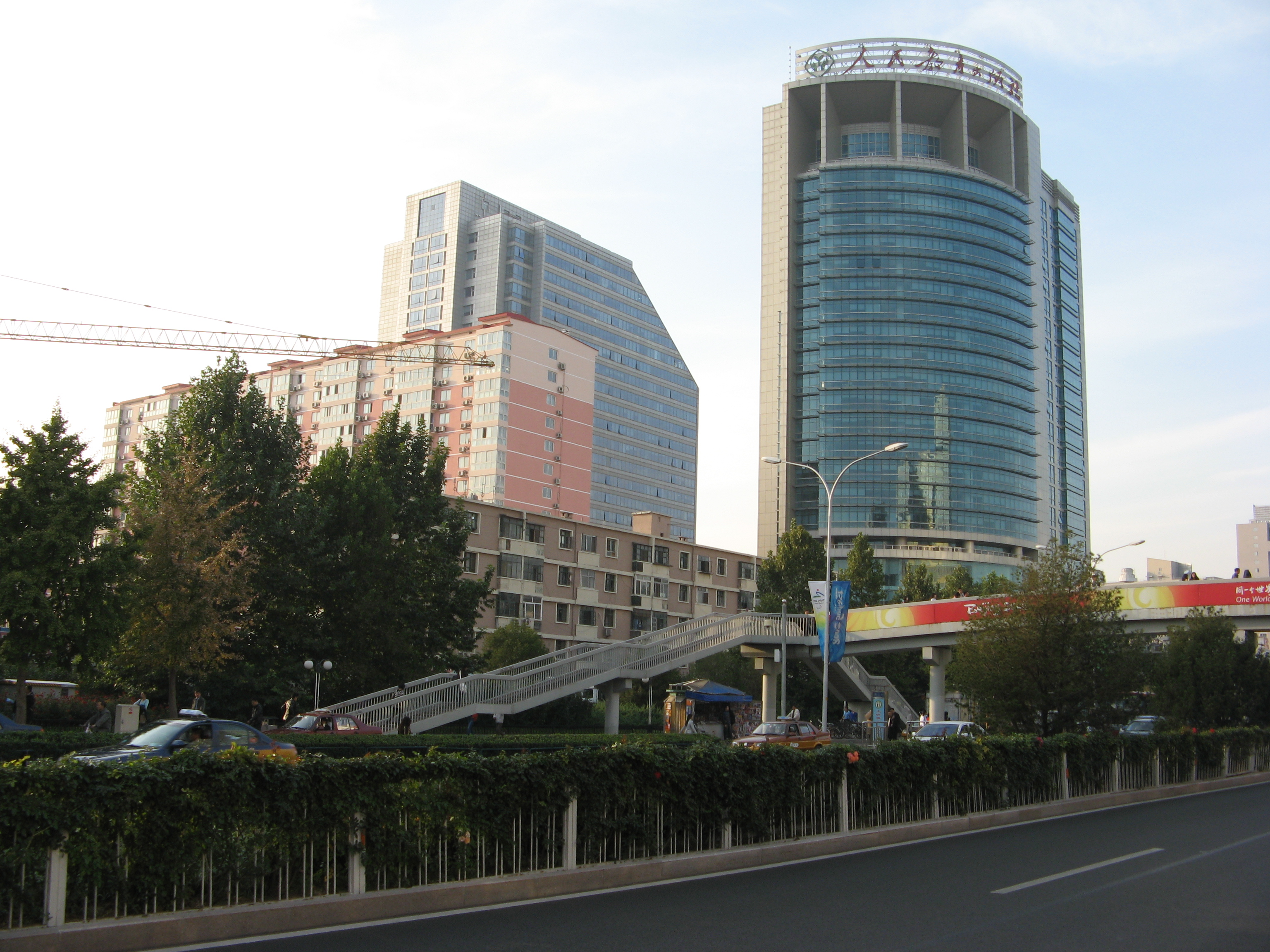
The headquarters of the People's Education Press in Weigong, China.

The People's Education Press (PEP; Chinese: 人民教育出版社; pinyin: Rénmín Jiàoyù Chūbǎnshè) is the oldest publishing house of the Ministry of Education of China. It was founded on December 1, 1950, and the name was inscribed by Chairman of the Chinese Communist Party Mao Zedong in his own handwriting. The main tasks are of researching, compiling, publishing, and distributing teaching materials for elementary and secondary education of the country.

Up to 2023, PEP has compiled and published twelve sets of national primary and secondary school textbooks, as well as many books for international Chinese language learners.

== History ==
On December 1, 1950, the People's Education Press was formally established, with its name written by Chairman Mao personally. The first president and editor-in-chief of the press was Ye Shengtao.

During the Cultural Revolution from 1966 to 1976, the People's Education Press was forced to stop working, primary and secondary school textbooks were compiled and published by provinces and cities instead.

In 1983, the Curriculum and Teaching Materials Research Institute was established, with its name written by Deng Xiaoping.

In September 2005, People's Education Press moved to a nearly 50,000 square meter building located in Zhongguancun.

On December 18, 2010, the "China Education Publishing and Media Group" was established, and People's Education Press became a core member of the group.

On May 5, 2018, Tencent and People’s Education Press officially signed a strategic cooperation agreement in Beijing.

On November 29, 2020, General Secretary of the Chinese Communist Party Xi Jinping wrote back to some retirees of the People’s Education Press, extending his greetings and urging efforts to create high quality teaching materials.

As of 2023, the People's Education Press has compiled, researched and published twelve sets of national primary and secondary school textbooks and multiple sets of vocational education textbooks and normal college textbooks. And in 2023, there were more than 1,300 employees. The People's Education Research Institute was established in the same year.

== Main publications ==
=== Books ===
The publications of People's Education Press include:

- Compulsory education textbooks
- Compulsory education curriculum standard experimental textbooks
- General high school textbooks
- General high school curriculum standard experimental textbooks
- Extracurricular reading materials for primary and secondary school students
- Teaching materials and supplementary teaching materials for Chinese as a foreign language
- Teaching materials and supplementary teaching materials for vocational schools
- Teaching materials for normal colleges

For international students, there include:

- Standard Chinese, Happy Chinese, Learn Chinese with Me, Mastering Chinese;
- Chinese Readers and Library of Chinese Classics Laozi. Chinese Picture Dictionary and International Chinese Learner's Dictionary; International Chinese Teaching Material Theory; BCT Standard Course and Official Examination Papers of HSK as exam guidebooks, and so on.

=== Audiovisual products ===
People's Education Press has published a large number of audiovisual products for basic education, such as "Standard Chinese (Revised Edition)", "Oriental Fairy Tale Mathematics - Creative Thinking for the Future", and "Standard Japanese for Sino-Japanese Communication", "English for Junior High School Listening and Speaking", etc.

On January 31, 2000, the books "Establishment for Generations - Deng Xiaoping and Education in the People's Republic of China" (VCD), "Garfield's Adventures in China" (Videotape), and "Junior High School Chemistry" (Videotape) published by People's Education Electronic Audio-visual Publishing House won the first "National Audio-visual Product Award".

== Related events ==
- In May 2022, a reader pointed out that the illustration style of the mathematics textbook used by People's Education Press since 2012 was weird, the characters in the illustrations all had small and wide-set eyes, their facial features were seriously unbalanced, their eyes were dull, and there were characters with crooked mouth, tongue sticking out and in bunny girl outfit, which sparked heated discussions on the Internet. After a three-month investigation, the Chinese Ministry of Education announced penalties for 27 people, including the editor-in-chief. The illustrations of the math textbooks have been recreated.

== See also ==
- Higher Education Press
- Publicity Department of the Chinese Communist Party
